= The Birds (collection) =

1995 fashion collection by Alexander McQueen

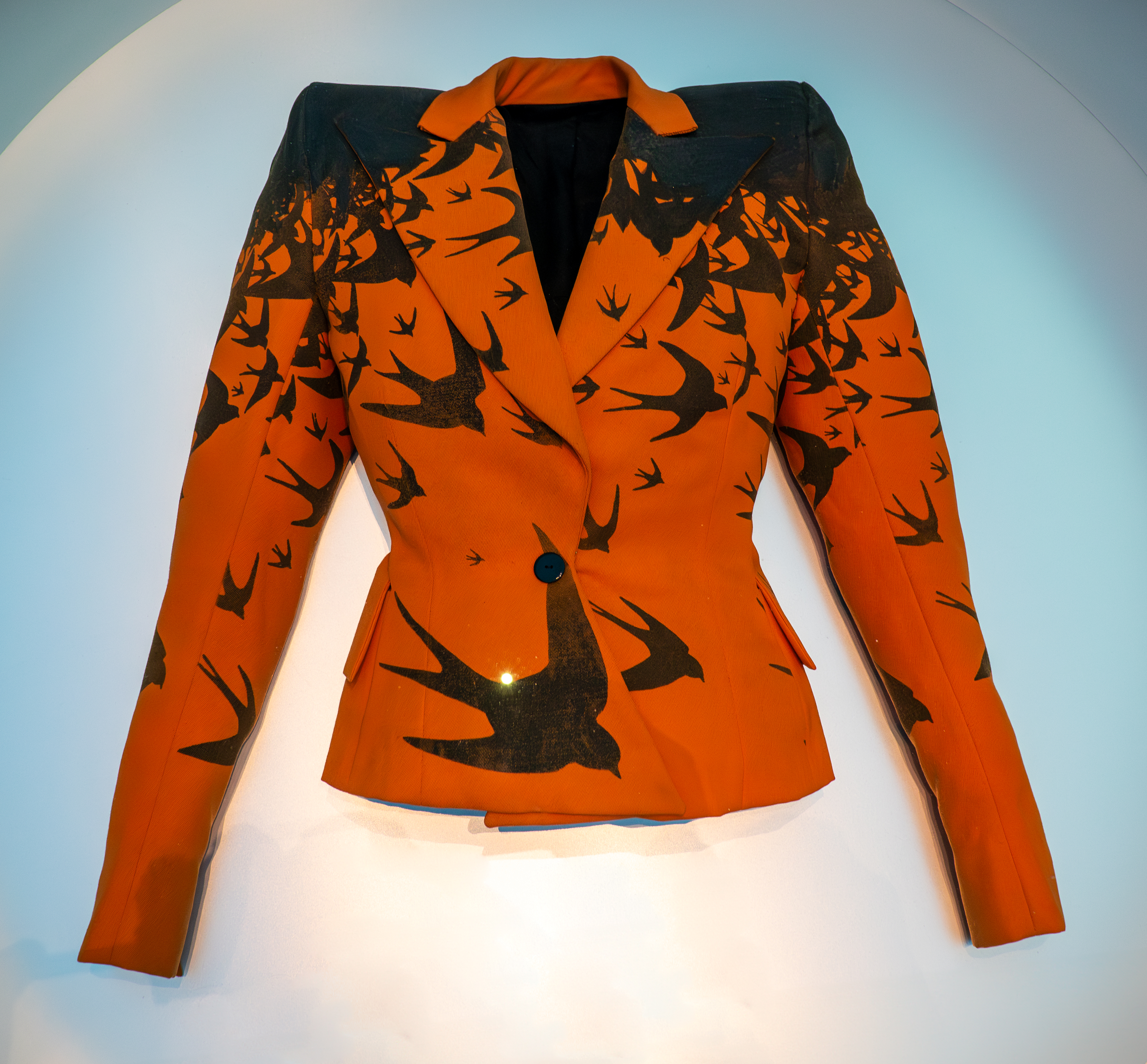
The jacket from Look 33 of The Birds, as presented at Sleeping Beauties: Reawakening Fashion at the Metropolitan Museum of Art, 2024 (Note: When referring to individual looks, this article uses the numbering from the Vogue retrospective of the collection.)

The Birds is the fifth collection by British designer Alexander McQueen, released for the Spring/Summer 1995 season of his eponymous fashion house. The Birds was inspired by ornithology, the study of birds, and the 1963 Alfred Hitchcock film The Birds, after which it was named. Typically for McQueen in the early stages of his career, the collection centred on sharply tailored garments and emphasised female sexuality. McQueen had no financial backing, so the collection was created on a minimal budget.

The runway show for The Birds was staged on 9 October 1994, during London Fashion Week. The venue was a warehouse in the London district of King's Cross best known for hosting raves. Like his previous professional shows, The Birds was styled with imagery of violence and death; some models were covered in tyre tracks and others wore white contact lenses. Forty-five looks were presented. Corsetier Mr. Pearl appeared in a pencil skirt and tailored jacket.

Reception was generally positive, although the extreme styling drew accusations of misogyny. Many of the people who worked on The Birds with McQueen would go on to become longtime collaborators. The success of the show allowed McQueen to secure the financial backing to stage his next show, Highland Rape (Autumn/Winter 1995), the collection which effectively made his name. Garments from The Birds appeared in both stagings of the retrospective exhibition Alexander McQueen: Savage Beauty. Seán McGirr heavily referenced The Birds for Autumn/Winter 2024, his debut collection as creative director for the Alexander McQueen brand.

== Background ==
British fashion designer Alexander McQueen was known for his imaginative, sometimes controversial designs, and dramatic fashion shows. Over the course of his career, which lasted from 1992 until his death in 2010, he explored a broad range of ideas and themes, particularly sexuality, death, violence, romanticism, and historicism. He began as an apprentice with Savile Row tailors Anderson & Sheppard before briefly joining Gieves & Hawkes as a pattern cutter. His work on Savile Row earned him a reputation as an expert tailor. In October 1990, at the age of 21, McQueen began the eighteen-month masters-level course in fashion design at Central Saint Martins (CSM), a London art school. McQueen met a number of his future collaborators at CSM, including Simon Ungless. He graduated with his master's degree in fashion design in 1992. His graduation collection, Jack the Ripper Stalks His Victims, was bought in its entirety by magazine editor Isabella Blow, who became his mentor and his muse.

McQueen's reputation for shocking runway shows began early. The sexualised clothing and aggressive styling in his first professional show, Nihilism (Spring/Summer 1994), was described by The Independent as a "horror show". The follow-up, Banshee (Autumn/Winter 1994), featured a model pretending to put a finger in her vagina on the runway. McQueen had no financial backing at the beginning of his career, so his collections were created on minimal budgets. He purchased whatever cheap fabric or fabric scraps were available. Collaborators often worked for minimal pay or were paid in garments. Some agreed to work for free because they were interested in working with McQueen, while others who had been promised compensation were simply never paid. Many actually wound up paying out of pocket for things like fabric and notions.

After Banshee was presented in London, fashion promoter Derek Anderson invited McQueen to reprise the show for New York Fashion Week. Reception was positive, and Anderson arranged for McQueen to meet fashion manufacturer Eo Bocci. Bocci expressed interest in the samples McQueen brought but wanted to see another show before signing a final contract. Anderson provided some of the funds for fabric for McQueen's next show.

== Concept and creative process ==
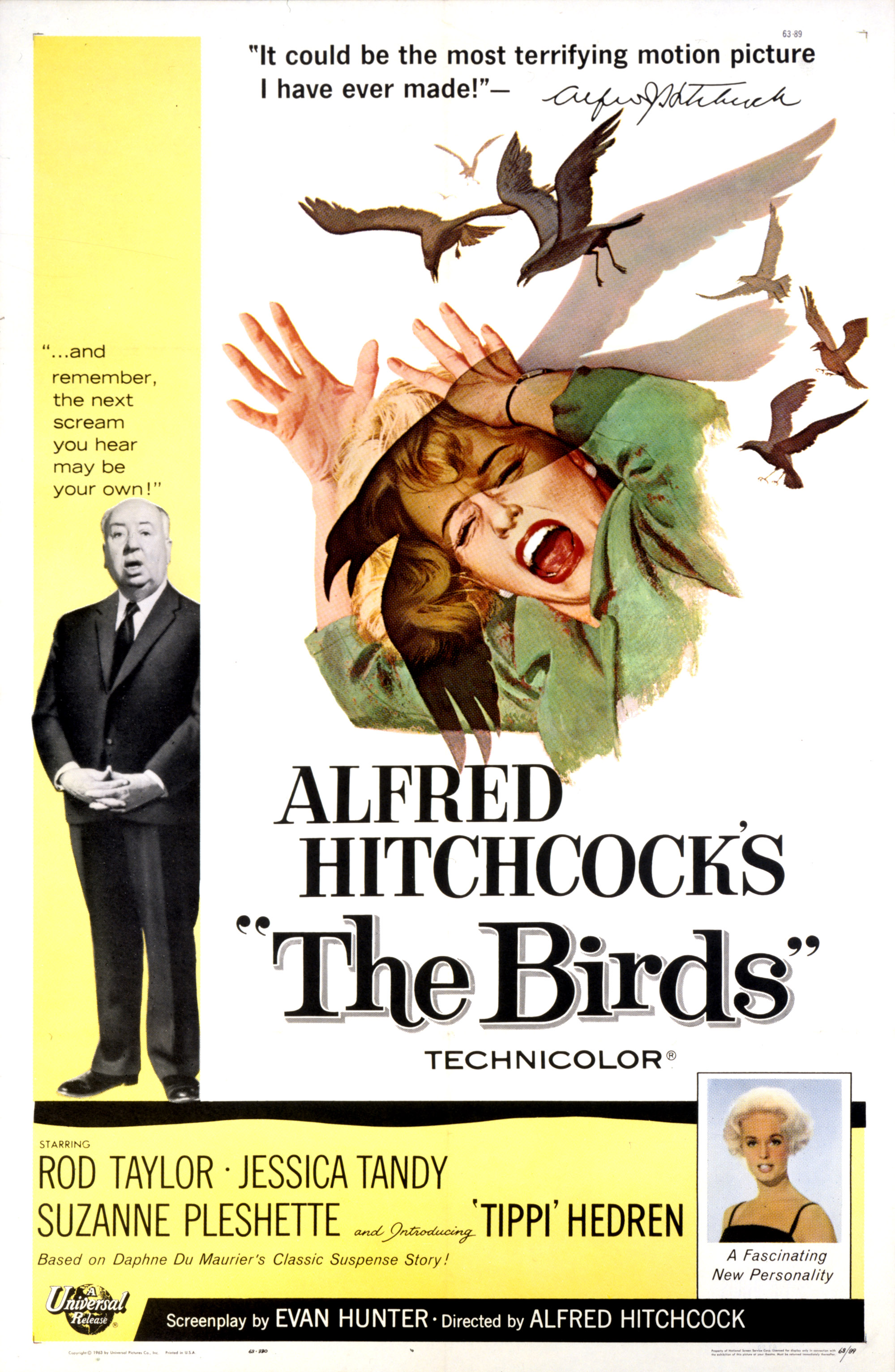
Original release poster for The Birds, the 1963 Alfred Hitchcock film which inspired the collection

The Birds (Spring/Summer 1995) is the fifth collection by McQueen for his eponymous fashion house. It had multiple layers of inspiration. The greatest part came from ornithology, the study of birds, and the 1963 Alfred Hitchcock film The Birds, for which it was named. McQueen was a cinemaphile and many of his collections were inspired by his favourites. The Birds also referenced the mathematically inspired art of Dutch graphic artist M. C. Escher, who used birds and other animals as tiles in artistic tessellations. Car accidents and roadkill served as an additional inspiration. Ungless designed a print of tyre tracks to be used on many of the garments, suggesting scenes in The Birds where the characters flee the attacking birds in cars. According to Ungless, the design echoed the rationale behind McQueen's use of dead locusts on garments in his earlier collection Nihilism: "Complete chaos and human vulnerability in the face of nature gone wrong".

Fleet Bigwood, a CSM lecturer, contributed to fabric design. Fashion designer Andrew Groves, whom McQueen dated from 1994 to 1996, worked on the collection after McQueen found out Groves could sew. McQueen enlisted Ungless to create printed fabric based on Escher's designs, and Ungless, then a print technician at CSM, stole fabric from the school to use as a base. Ungless laid out a concept based on McQueen's request to have a print with "garden birds", but described the result as "awful – like a Christmas card gone wrong". Groves was asked to replace it, coming up with a print of black silhouettes of swallows in flight, a popular motif in classic skinhead subculture and nautical tattoos, representing endurance and courage. The print most prominently appeared on Look 33, on a burnt orange jacket, and Look 40, on an orange-red pencil skirt. It also appeared on a white frock coat, the show's final ensemble. The print appears to depict swallows mid-dive, possibly in reference to a scene in Hitchcock's film where birds invade a home by diving down the chimney.

Many of McQueen's designs for The Birds, particularly the tight pencil skirts and wasp-waisted jackets, emulated the tightly tailored 1950s fashion worn by the film's star, Tippi Hedren, although he avoided directly copying her outfit. Ungless described McQueen as fascinated by the way Hedren was made vulnerable by her constricting clothing, and sought to take the effect to an extreme. Some models found the garments difficult to walk in on the runway. Despite the extensive presence of tailoring, Groves later suggested that McQueen's time as a theatrical costumier had more influence on this collection than his time on Savile Row. McQueen's bumsters, an extremely low-cut trouser that exposed the top of the intergluteal cleft, made an appearance in several outfits, including in wet-look black for Look 43.

Pallet wrap! Oh! Gotta make a fucking dress!

— Alexander McQueen

McQueen often designed spontaneously, right on the dressmaker's dummy, and did so for many of the looks in The Birds. Groves described watching him create an entire dress on the stand in approximately an hour, working from raw materials, without any realisation that this was a highly unconventional method. Look 35, a dress made of clear pallet wrap, was created in a similar fashion. It was inspired by a sexual encounter Groves had years earlier, in which the other man wrapped Groves in pallet wrap, immobilising him. Some weeks after Groves told McQueen about the incident, the two were walking on the street when McQueen spotted a discarded bolt of pallet wrap and took it home to make a dress that night.

== Runway show ==
Look 35, dress made from pallet wrap and tied with string, worn over black bikini underwear, model unknown

=== Production details ===
The runway show was staged on 9 October 1994 during London Fashion Week. The venue was Bagley's, a warehouse in the London district of King's Cross. Bagley's was known for hosting raves, and was allegedly owned by British organised crime. McQueen was able to secure the use of the warehouse for only £500. The show's invite was a black and white photograph of a baby bird lying on a roadway, apparently run over. McQueen was so poor at the time of The Birds that he had to borrow money to pay for a cab to get to the show.

Jewellery designer Simon Costin had asked to do the set design in exchange for also lending accessories for the show. McQueen readily agreed, especially since Costin offered to work for free and the show's budget was, as Costin later put it, "something like fifty pounds". Because of the limited budget, the set was kept simple: a black backdrop and a straight black concrete runway with white slashes meant to look like road markings, inspired by the tyre tread pattern found on some of the clothing. Models entered through a short backlit tunnel at the rear of the stage.

Sam Gainsbury served as casting director. McQueen found a stylist to help him oversee the models' looks for the runway show: Katy England, then working for British magazine Dazed & Confused. As with Costin, England also had no experience in the role; McQueen selected her based on having seen her at shows in stylish outfits. In addition to her styling duties, she also served as a fit model for many of the garments. England added a few outside garments for the runway show, including leather jackets.

=== Catwalk presentation ===
The styling for the models was explicitly sexual, with many runway looks exposing underwear or bare breasts. One look consisted solely of a silver lamé jacket over lace underwear. Look 35, the clear pallet wrap dress, was worn with nothing but black bikini underwear, and the model's upper thighs were tied with string to create a pencil skirt effect. The models wore stiletto heels attached to their feet with packing tape; these were cheap shoes bought from charity shops with the uppers removed to leave only the soles and heels. The accessories Costin supplied included pieces made from jet, enamel, and cockerel feathers, including one black feathered dickey worn over a gold shift dress. Look 43 was styled with a black choker hung with a taxidermy bird.

Makeup was styled by artist Val Garland, and was kept light: skin was pale and lips were orange-red. Eugene Souleiman styled hair, with McQueen requesting a look of "destruction". Souleiman opted not to emulate Hedren's iconic bouffant updo, as McQueen would have found the visual homage "too obvious". Souleiman decided to have the models' hair blow-dried straight and the ends crimped to fluffiness, creating a floating effect while they walked the runway. Just before the show, McQueen decided to add tyre tracks to some of the models to make it look as though they had been run over. They used a tyre from his assistant's car, covered it in grease, and rolled it over the models before they got dressed. This effect is most clearly seen in Look 12, a frock coat worn with nothing but a pair of high-cut briefs. Some models were given opaque white full-eye contact lenses to give them a dehumanised look. These were custom-made at significant cost, paid for by Derek Anderson, a supporter of McQueen's from New York City who worked in public relations and helped fund many of McQueen's early projects.

McQueen had generated a great deal of excitement about the show in the media, and there was a long queue to get in. The majority of the audience were fashion students and ravers, however – the fashion establishment was not yet interested in McQueen, and the few industry professionals who attended mostly did so at the behest of Isabella Blow. The tight budget did not allow for any security, and one of McQueen's public relations people had to manage the rowdy crowd. Both of McQueen's parents were in attendance, although his father – who was not entirely comfortable with McQueen's choice of career – turned up late, stayed at the back of the venue, and left without speaking to his son. The show started 90 minutes late. It ended with the audience on their feet screaming.

Forty-five looks were presented. Fashion writer Plum Sykes, then an assistant at British Vogue, modelled Look 33. She later recalled the experience as "Magic, mad, and marvelous!" Corsetmaker Mr. Pearl, who had met McQueen at a King's Cross club, walked the runway in Look 40, a tailored short jacket, shirt and tie, and tight red pencil skirt with the swallow print. (Note: Some authors state that it was the first time McQueen had a male model walk in one of his shows. This is incorrect; McQueen's first professional runway show, Nihilism had featured an androgynous-looking male model.) His corset-trained waist was only 18 inches at the time. Mr. Pearl later called the experience boring and said he had never been paid, but that he was "pleased to have met" McQueen. Madonna was rumoured to have purchased the jacket modelled by Mr. Pearl, indicating that McQueen's work was attracting more attention.

== Reception ==
It was, quite simply, astonishing and one of those electrifying moments when you realized that a designer had arrived possessed of the single-minded vision and passion and talent to challenge the paradigm. It seemed even then that fashion would never be the same again, and McQueen's low-slung silhouette and savage imagination would come to define the decade.

— Fashion journalist Hamish Bowles, speaking of The Birds following McQueen's death in 2010

Journalist Dana Thomas reports that the reviews were very positive, particularly with regards to McQueen's sharp tailoring. Both The Times and the Evening Standard called the show the "hottest ticket" of London Fashion Week that season. Writing for the Evening Standard, Alison Veness called the close-cut designs "sharp enough to draw blood". In a short review for The Globe and Mail, David Livingstone wrote that McQueen had "achieved heights of lowdown style", with "attitude anchored in skill". Women's Wear Daily highlighted the blatant sexuality and streetwear elements as well as McQueen's tailoring, stating that "McQueen can cut with the best of them". In an overview of British designers for Fashion Week, Iain R. Webb wrote that McQueen's "sense of the macabre has the international fashion set screaming for more".

Other reviewers were not so uniformly impressed. Although Amy Spindler of The New York Times found the tailored jackets excellent and acknowledged that McQueen was generating the most discussion of any designer in London that season, she was critical of the tight pencil skirts and bumster trousers, saying "It is strange to see so talented a designer committed to the unwearable". Barbara Weiser, of the now-defunct Charivari boutique chain, attended the show and described the collection as unimaginative and uncreative.

The show is regarded positively in retrospect. Fashion journalist Hamish Bowles described the show as "a revelation" in 1999. He revisited the collection in 2010 after McQueen's death, calling it the point that he realised McQueen's potential to change the status quo of fashion. In a 2015 retrospective, Vogue highlighted the aesthetic of destruction in the collection and noted it had been a recurring theme in McQueen's fashion throughout his career. The same year, I-D deemed the bumsters from the collection as one of the defining looks of McQueen's career.

== Analysis ==
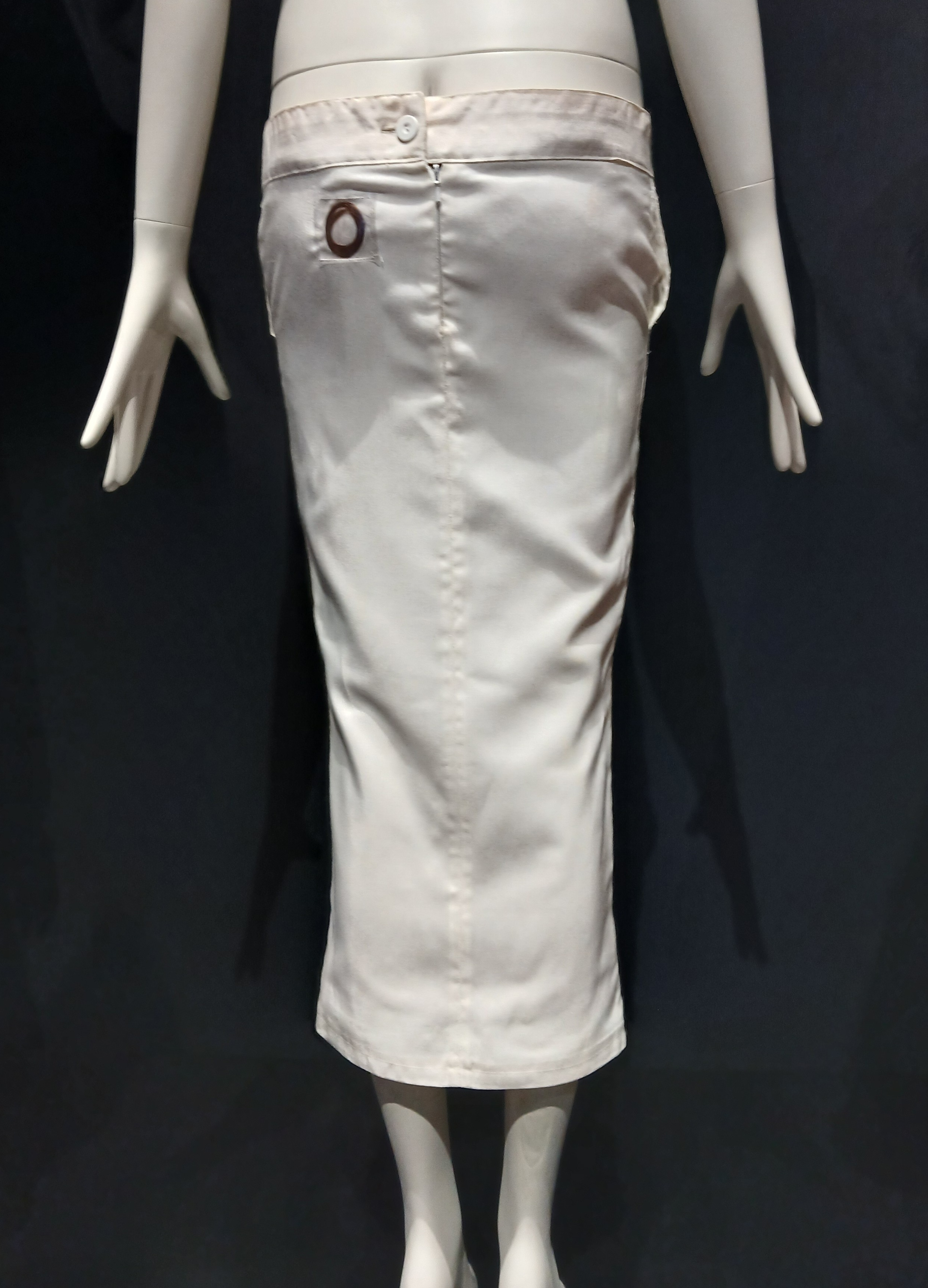
Bumster skirt with hair label from The Birds, at the exhibit accompanying the House of McQueen play, 2025

Much of the critical analysis of The Birds revolves around the depiction of women as apparent victims of violence, especially in light of the sexualised styling of the clothing. The show drew accusations that the presentation was misogynistic, not for the first or the last time in McQueen's career. McQueen objected to this characterisation, saying: "I don’t want women to look all innocent and naive, because I know what can happen to them. I want women to look stronger." Ungless stated that McQueen's object was to depict a beautiful woman "put at extreme risk but winning in the end".

Fashion historian Caroline Evans positioned the extreme styling of The Birds as typical of independent British fashion designers in the 1990s. At the time, the industry was poorly supported and funding was scarce. Young designers took to creating shocking runway shows to generate press coverage in the hopes of attracting backers. Evans suggests that once McQueen found sufficient backing, he pivoted the styling of his shows from violent to theatrical. Diana Villanueva Romero analysed the collection from an ecofeminist perspective, arguing that although McQueen had previously presented women as victims of violence, it was only with The Birds that McQueen had "for the first time, situated women as substitutes for animal victims". In her view, McQueen was presenting a connection between the cruelty suffered by both women and animals in order to denounce this violence. In an opinion piece for Fangoria, author Vanessa Guerrera argued that McQueen's presentation in The Birds subverted the 1960s aesthetic by making the models "less the standard chic, pretty little things, and more things to dread". Guerrera believed the indicia of violence – torn clothes, white eyes, and tyre tracks – made the models intimidating, and therefore showed that McQueen was positioning women as empowered survivors rather than as powerless victims. Author Ana Finel Honigman agreed, writing that "the models symbolised the struggle to survive".

Alistair O'Neill focused on the collection as it related to Hitchcock. McQueen referenced several of the director's films throughout his career, exploring what O'Neill called "representations of femininity and how they are challenged through transformation scenes". For O'Neill, the reappearance of the swallows print on the skirt worn by Mr. Pearl was McQueen's way of "translating femininity through artifice from one body to another". He argued that by having a man walk in a womenswear show wearing womenswear, McQueen was disrupting the "ordered sense of femininity" typical of catwalk shows. Honigman also remarked on the "interplay of masculine and feminine", noting Mr. Pearl's appearance as an example of how McQueen challenged gender archetypes.

== Legacy ==
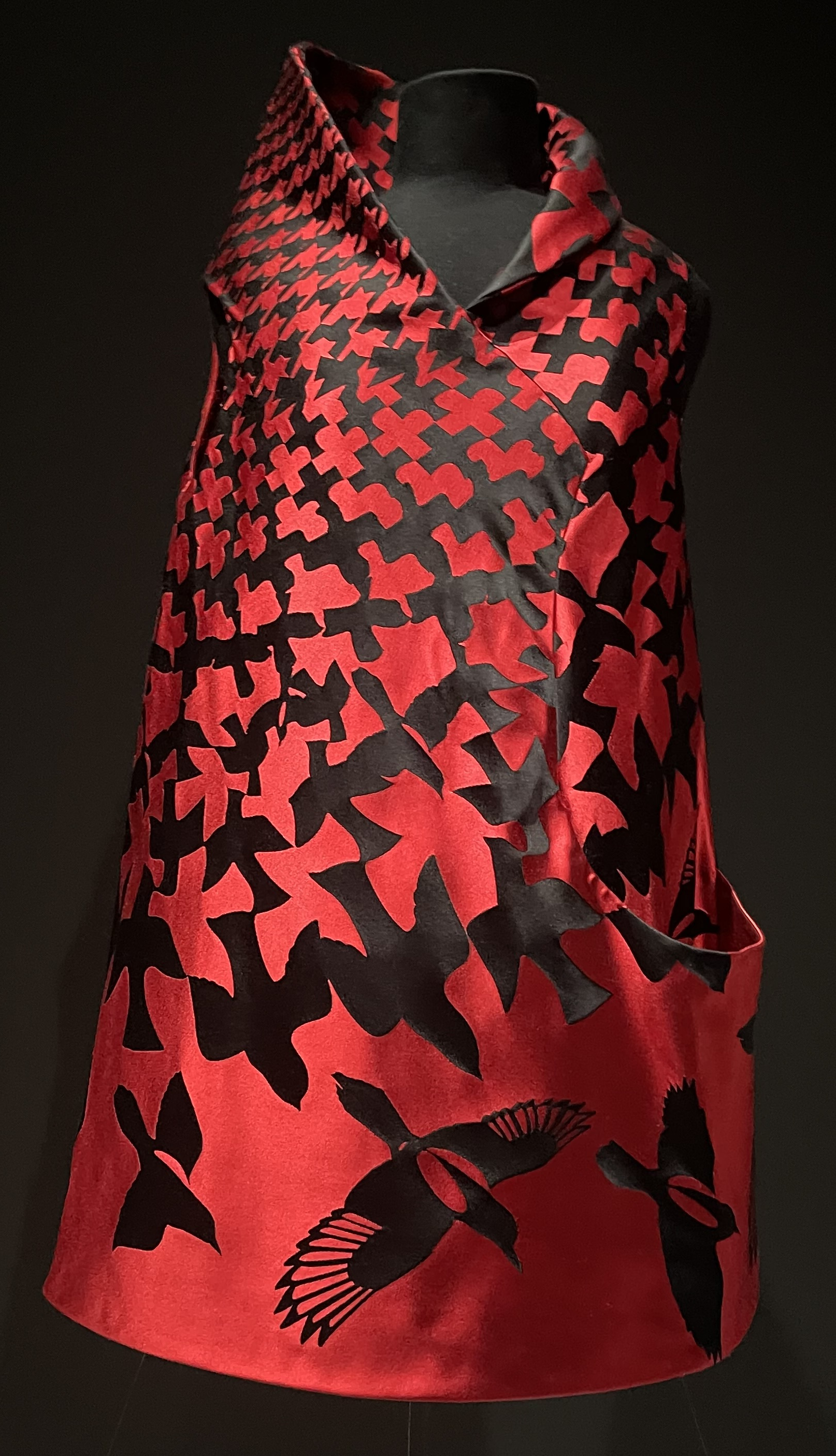
Look 29 from The Horn of Plenty (Autumn/Winter 2009), featuring the reworked swallow print from The Birds

Following the show, Italian fashion manufacturer Eo Bocci offered to purchase 51% of McQueen's label for £10,000. McQueen refused, as he wanted to retain control of his company. Instead, they agreed on a pair of related contracts: the first gave Bocci distribution rights for McQueen's label for the next fifteen years, and the second made Bocci responsible for arranging manufacturing for McQueen. Bocci would source Italian garment manufacturers to produce McQueen's clothes for retail. The money from the deal with Bocci gave McQueen the funding to stage his next show, Highland Rape (Autumn/Winter 1995), the collection which effectively made his name.

Many of the people who worked on The Birds went on to become regular collaborators. Stylist Katy England, who worked as McQueen's creative director until 2007, became known as his "second opinion". Simon Ungless worked on prints for later collections, including Highland Rape and Dante (Autumn/Winter 1996). Simon Costin worked with McQueen regularly until Untitled (Spring/Summer 1998). Sam Gainsbury, working with her partner Anna Whiting, went on to produce all of McQueen's runway shows. Val Garland styled makeup for several future shows, including The Dance of the Twisted Bull (Spring/Summer 2002) and In Memory of Elizabeth Howe, Salem, 1692 (Autumn/Winter 2007). Eugene Souleiman returned to style hair for Scanners (Autumn/Winter 2003) and The Widows of Culloden (Autumn/Winter 2006), among others.

A tyre track print was used again for Look 63 of Bellmer La Poupée (Spring/Summer 1997). Birds, wings, and feathers were a recurring theme in McQueen's work throughout his career, particularly in La Dame Bleue (Spring/Summer 2008), whose stage was illuminated by giant blue neon wings, and The Horn of Plenty (Autumn/Winter 2009), which featured women in feathered dresses and a reworked version of the swallows print from The Birds. Cinema also remained a significant influence; future collections such as Deliverance (Spring/Summer 2004) and The Man Who Knew Too Much (Autumn/Winter 2005) took direct visual cues from the films which inspired them. One look from The Man Who Knew Too Much is a clear duplicate of Tippi Hedren's outfit from The Birds, a reference he had avoided making in the eponymous collection.

The Metropolitan Museum of Art (the Met) in New York City acquired the orange jacket from Look 33 in 2013. It appeared in the 2015 staging of Alexander McQueen: Savage Beauty at the Victoria and Albert Museum in London. It has also appeared in the Met's exhibitions Masterworks: Unpacking Fashion (2016) and Sleeping Beauties: Reawakening Fashion (2024).

When early McQueen employee Ruti Danan auctioned her personal archive in 2020, an invitation to The Birds sold for a reported $625 USD. Patterns for a backless jacket, dress, and bumsters sold for $1,125, $1,625, and $2,375, respectively. The bird choker from Look 43 was auctioned by Kerry Taylor Auctions in June 2023, fetching a reported £24,000.

Seán McGirr heavily referenced The Birds for Autumn/Winter 2024, his debut collection as creative director for the Alexander McQueen brand.

== Bibliography ==
- Bolton, Andrew (2011). Alexander McQueen: Savage Beauty. New York City: Metropolitan Museum of Art. ISBN 978-1-58839-412-5. OCLC 687693871.
- Bolton, Andrew (2024). Sleeping Beauties: Reawakening Fashion. New York City: Metropolitan Museum of Art. ISBN 978-1-58839-777-5.
- Breward, Christopher (2003). Fashion. Oxford: Oxford University Press. ISBN 978-0-19-158773-3.
- Callahan, Maureen (2014). Champagne Supernovas: Kate Moss, Marc Jacobs, Alexander McQueen, and the '90s Renegades Who Remade Fashion. New York City: Touchstone Books. ISBN 978-1-4516-4053-3.
- Escher, M. C.; Locher, J. L. (1974). The World of M. C. Escher (New Concise NAL ed.). New York City: Abrams. ISBN 978-0-451-79961-6.
- Esguerra, Clarissa M.; Hansen, Michaela (2022). Lee Alexander McQueen: Mind, Mythos, Muse. New York City: Delmonico Books. ISBN 978-1-63681-018-8. OCLC 1289986708.
- Evans, Caroline (2003). Fashion at the Edge: Spectacle, Modernity and Deathliness. New Haven, Connecticut: Yale University Press. ISBN 978-0-300-10192-8.
- Fairer, Robert; Wilcox, Claire (2016). Alexander McQueen: Unseen. New Haven, Connecticut: Yale University Press. p. 14. ISBN 978-0-300-22267-8. OCLC 946216643.
- Gleason, Katherine (2012). Alexander McQueen: Evolution. New York City: Race Point Publishing. ISBN 978-1-61058-837-9. Archived from the original on 5 January 2023.
- Honigman, Ana Finel (2021). What Alexander McQueen Can Teach You About Fashion. London: Frances Lincoln. ISBN 978-0-7112-5906-5.
- Mora, Juliana Luna; Berry, Jess (2 September 2022). "Creative Direction Succession in Luxury Fashion: The Illusion of Immortality at Chanel and Alexander McQueen". Luxury. 9 (2–3): 117–140. doi:10.1080/20511817.2022.2194039. ISSN 2051-1817.
- Schonberger, Nick (2022). The Language of Tattoos: 130 Symbols and What They Mean. London: Frances Lincoln. ISBN 978-0-7112-6786-2.
- Thomas, Dana (2015). Gods and Kings: The Rise and Fall of Alexander McQueen and John Galliano. New York City: Penguin Publishing. ISBN 978-1-101-61795-3.
- Watt, Judith (2012). Alexander McQueen: The Life and the Legacy. New York City: Harper Design. ISBN 978-1-84796-085-6. OCLC 892706946.
- Wilcox, Claire, ed. (2015). Alexander McQueen. New York City: Abrams Books. ISBN 978-1-4197-1723-9. OCLC 891618596.
  - Bethune, Kate. "Encyclopedia of Collections". In Wilcox (2015), pp. 303–326.
  - Bolton, Andrew. "In Search of the Sublime". In Wilcox (2015), pp. 15–21.
  - Frankel, Susannah. "The Early Years". In Wilcox (2015), pp. 69–79.
  - O'Neill, Alistair. "The Shining and Chic". In Wilcox (2015), pp. 261–280.
- Wilson, Andrew (2015). Alexander McQueen: Blood Beneath the Skin. New York City: Simon and Schuster. ISBN 978-1-4767-7674-3.
