= Bellmer La Poupée =

1997 fashion collection by Alexander McQueen

Debra Shaw wearing Look 47, with the shackled frame that generated controversy over the perceived reference to slavery

Bellmer La Poupée (often shortened to La Poupée) is the ninth collection by British fashion designer Alexander McQueen, released for the Spring/Summer 1997 season of his eponymous fashion house. The collection used La Poupée, a 1934 series by Surrealist photographer Hans Bellmer, as a jumping-off point to deconstruct narrow standards of beauty considered acceptable by the fashion industry. The collection featured McQueen's signature sharp tailoring and dresses that ranged from commercial shift dresses to experimental high-collared designs, embellished with unusual zipper placement and graffiti. Shaun Leane and Dai Rees were recruited to produce experimental jewellery and accessories.

The runway show was staged on 27 September 1996 at the Royal Horticultural Hall at 80 Vincent Square in London. Ninety looks were presented, mostly womenswear with some menswear. (Note: For convenience, when referring to individual looks, this article uses the numbering from the Vogue retrospective of the collection. Their overview counts 79 looks, but contains some duplications and omissions that cause the count to be incorrect. Look numbers mentioned in this article have not been adjusted. Eleven looks were omitted from Vogue, as follows: a pair of models in identical sleeveless white jumpsuits and another in a blue skirt suit worn with silver headpiece, all following Look 2; two shirtless men in white trousers following Look 4; a shirtless man in black trousers and quill neckpiece following Look 23; a red men's suit and a man in a white mesh shirt and white trousers, both following Look 62; two ensembles consisting of a white jacket worn shirtless over white trousers and another of a white mesh shirt over red trousers, all following Look 68. In the Vogue numbering, Look 12 depicts two models. Looks 23 and 24 are the same ensemble.) The stage was a shallow tank filled with water and lined with black plastic, inspired by the art installation 20:50 by Richard Wilson. Models wore translucent platform shoes so they appeared to be walking atop the water. Debra Shaw, a Black model, walked while shackled to a square metal frame, generating controversy over the perceived reference to slavery. Shaw has discussed her experience in the show as a positive one.

The clothing and runway show were well-received, and the collection is remembered as one of McQueen's best. Critical analysis has focused on Shaw's appearance, the effectiveness of the Bellmer inspiration, and McQueen's subversion of fashion industry norms. Items from La Poupée have been photographed for magazines, worn on the red carpet, and featured in museum exhibitions.

== Background ==
British fashion designer Alexander McQueen was known for his imaginative, sometimes controversial designs, and dramatic fashion shows. Over the course of his career, which lasted from 1992 until his death in 2010, he explored a broad range of ideas and themes, particularly sexuality, death, violence, romanticism, and historicism. He began as an apprentice on Savile Row, earning a reputation as an expert tailor. In 1992, McQueen graduated from Central Saint Martins, a London art school, with his master's degree in fashion design. His degree collection, Jack the Ripper Stalks His Victims, was bought in its entirety by magazine editor Isabella Blow, who became his mentor and his muse. McQueen's reputation for shocking runway shows began early, and his sexualised designs and aggressive styling drew accusations of misogyny. The controversy over his sixth collection, Highland Rape (Autumn/Winter 1995), is considered to be the launching point of his fame and has been credited with leading to his appointment as head designer at French luxury fashion house Givenchy in October 1996.

His work was highly autobiographical: he incorporated elements of his memories, feelings, and personal fixations into his designs and runway shows. His interest in Surrealism reached back to his childhood. Throughout his career, he habitually played with shapes and silhouettes, using hair, make-up, accessories, and styling to make his models look unnatural or inhuman. He loved photography, experimenting with taking his own and collecting prints, and many collections were inspired by the work of his favourite photographers. McQueen often described the fashion industry as toxic and suffocating, and was often ambivalent about continuing his career. Several collections critiqued the industry as chaotic and deranged.

McQueen often worked with other creatives to produce things outside his area of expertise for runway shows, such as hats or jewellery; he typically relied on a close set of regular partners. McQueen had a longstanding and particularly close working relationship with jeweller Shaun Leane, who had worked with him as early as Highland Rape after they met during their student years. Simon Costin was McQueen's set designer and art director on several early shows. McQueen's usual hatmaker was Philip Treacy; they had been introduced by Blow and although they were friends, they were also rivals for her attention.

== Concept and collection ==
=== Inspiration ===
Untitled photograph from Hans Bellmer's La Poupeé photo book (1936)

Bellmer La Poupée, often shortened to La Poupée, is the ninth collection by McQueen for his eponymous fashion house, for the Spring/Summer 1997 season. (Note: The original invitation reads Bellmer La Poupée.) It was inspired by La Poupée (transl. "The Doll"), a 1934 series by German Surrealist photographer Hans Bellmer, which depicted deconstructed pubescent-looking dolls in disturbing poses. Some, including McQueen, have interpreted his work as a response to the rise of the Nazi Party in 1930s Germany and their desire for aesthetic perfection and control of human behaviour. The Nazis eventually declared Bellmer's work "degenerate art" and he fled to Paris to escape them in 1938.

With Bellmer's work in mind, McQueen intended to draw an analogy between fascist aesthetic ideals and the narrow standards of beauty and taste considered acceptable by the fashion industry. In particular, he was reacting to the unforgiving, minimalist style of Italian brand Prada, which was dominant in fashion at the time. Prada has occasionally been labelled "fascist" fashion because of how strict and militaristic some of its designs appear. McQueen wanted to showcase a type of beauty which did not adhere to top-down dictates about propriety and attractiveness, and which permitted the appearance of a wider – and stranger – range of women, consistent with what he saw in theatre and film.

=== Collection ===
McQueen's show notes described La Poupée as fusing the "purity of Far Eastern culture with the sharp punk elements of the West". The collection focused on McQueen's signature tailoring, with close-fitting suits, jumpsuits with deep cuts down the back of the neck or the cleavage, and origami-inspired jackets. Many of these items had exaggerated points at hems and lapels. Bumsters, a style of trousers whose extremely low waist exposed the top of the intergluteal cleft, returned to the runway; McQueen had developed them for his second collection, Taxi Driver (Autumn/Winter 1993). Despite the aggressive styling associated with the runway show, McQueen deliberately presented more saleable designs compared to his previous work, saying that "This season is all about smoothing down the edges."

Dresses were presented in colourful Asian-influenced brocades, white silks, and sheer fabrics worn over bikini bottoms. In terms of silhouettes, there were shift dresses, bias cut evening dresses, and flapper dresses with fringe. More unusually, McQueen also showed cocktail dresses with collars so high they obscured the face, which have been described as a Surrealist touch. Some items had Japanese-influenced shapes, such as a silk brocade jacket with kimono-like sleeves from Look 61. These items may have been inspired by a tattoo of koi fish McQueen had on his chest.

Many items were embellished with slashes of what looked like neon spray paint. A tyre track print that first occurred in The Birds (Spring/Summer 1995) was used again for Look 63. Zippers were placed in unusual places: on the knees, or in spots that would be revealing, such as across the nipples. The slashing effect caused by the zippers may have been a reference to the dismembered look of Bellmer's dolls. Journalist Amy Spindler thought the zipper pulls suggested nipple piercings. Judith Watt felt the zippers may have been a reference to the Surrealist designs of Elsa Schiaparelli. She also considered that they may have been inspired by Manism 2, a 1991 collection by John McKitterick; McQueen worked for McKitterick briefly during the early 1990s.

=== Accessories ===
What set [McQueen] apart from other designers at the time ... is that he had a good eye for finding accessory designers who were on the edge of fashion. They didn’t come from a normal trajectory of fashion.

— Dai Rees, quoted in Gods and Kings (2015)

Dai Rees, a Welsh sculptor and friend of McQueen's, was responsible for the show's headpieces and leather accessories. Rees normally worked in pottery, but was trying something new – latticed headpieces made from stripped-down quill feathers – and had been told by a friend to show his work to a fashion stylist. He took them to Katy England, who worked at the fashion magazine Dazed & Confused and styled for McQueen on the side. England directed Rees to McQueen, who was immediately taken by the concept and commissioned fifteen pieces for the show. He asked for cages for the head as well as quill-covered leather items, directing Rees to make something that gave the models an animalistic look. Rees painted the stripped quills in bright shades and covered them in glitter, metallic paint, or coffee grounds to mimic rust. According to Rees, McQueen had an ulterior motive in hiring him: he knew it would irritate Treacy, McQueen's usual hatmaker-cum-rival, who did not get along with Rees.

McQueen commissioned another friend, jeweller Shaun Leane, to work on the show. The jewellery items he commissioned were unusual – grids worn on the face, or neck-pieces that protruded well off the body. Theorist Caroline Evans wrote that they "mirrored the elegant cruelty of McQueen's razor-sharp cutting techniques".

McQueen worked with Leane to develop larger items that would restrict the models' bodies in various ways. He hoped to have them move unnaturally, as a reference to Bellmer's mechanical dolls and marionettes. Leane produced a square frame that locked on to the model's body above the elbows and knees, and another that fit into the sleeves of a jacket and forced the model's arms to extend horizontally. (Note: Sarah Burton recalls the frame as being produced by a Brick Lane metalworker.) Although the coat has conventional raglan sleeves, the distorting effect of the frame gives the effect of a "doll that has been pieced together". Authors have variously interpreted this look as being a reference to wings in flight or being fastened in stocks.

McQueen asked Debra Shaw, who is Black, to wear the square frame for the runway show. She had worked with McQueen in previous shows, including Dante (Autumn/Winter 1996). Shaw asked him to explain his thinking, concerned that the frame might have been a reference to slavery of Black people. McQueen explained that it was intended to be a commentary on the constraining nature of fashion. She felt his explanation was sincere, and thought the restraint would have been constructed far differently, with chains, and shackles at the wrists and ankles, if it were meant to evoke chattel slavery. In 2015, curator Lou Stoppard spoke to Katy England, McQueen's stylist, who recalled that Shaw was asked to wear the frame because it fitted her best.

== Runway show ==
=== Production details ===
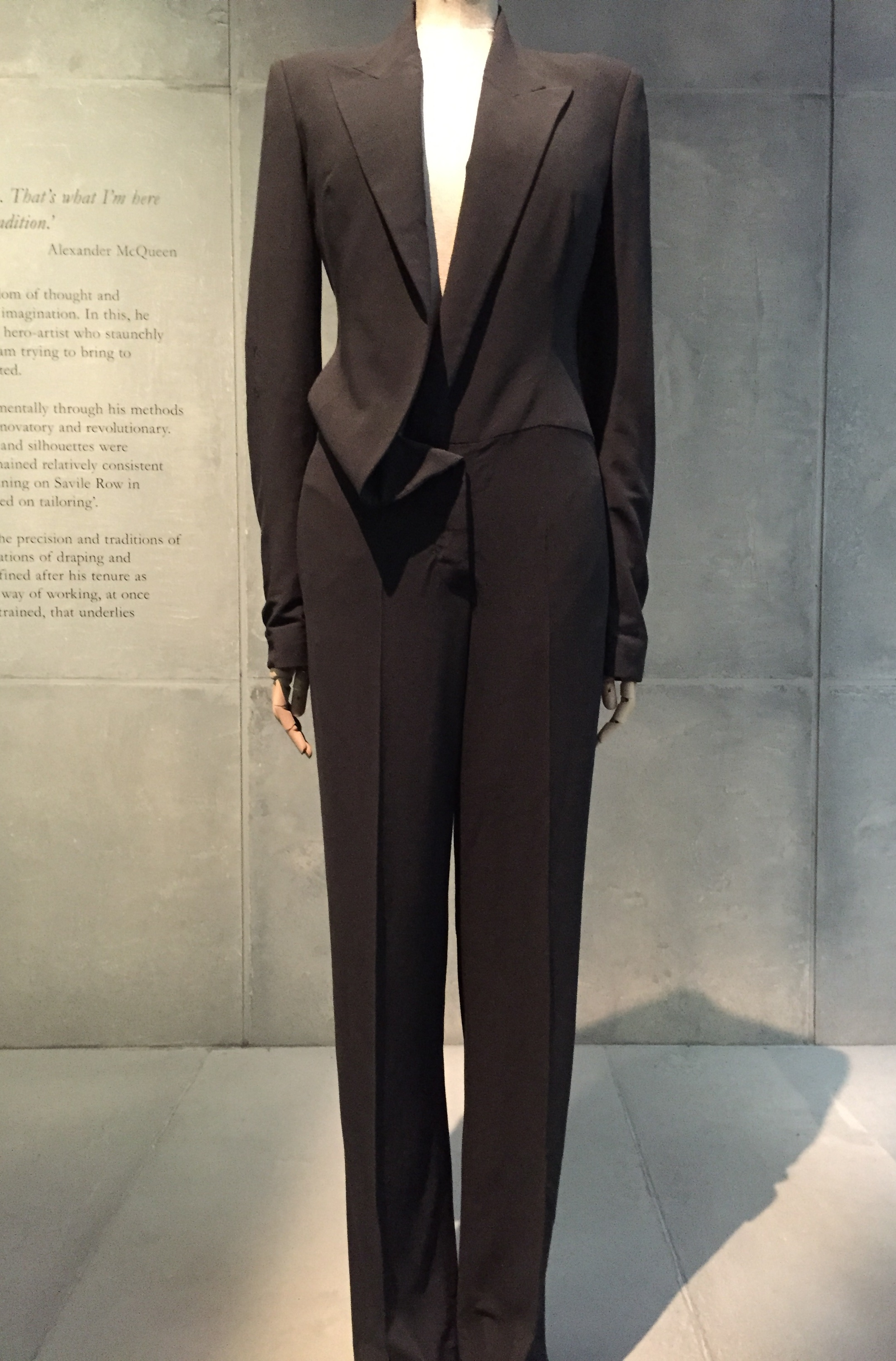
Look 25 from Bellmer La Poupée at Alexander McQueen: Savage Beauty (2015)

The runway show was staged on 27 September 1996 at the Royal Horticultural Hall at 80 Vincent Square in London. The show was sponsored by Tanqueray, a London-based gin brand. The invitations and show programme featured reproductions of some of Bellmer's photographs. Sounds effects of moans, snores, and radar pings were played during the show.

The show packed the venue to capacity with an audience of roughly 800 people. It was, at that time, the largest audience McQueen had ever had. Notable guests included American fashion editors, and representatives from fashion conglomerate LVMH, the owner of Givenchy. They would shortly be McQueen's managers when he took his position at Givenchy in October that year. Victoria and David Beckham were meant to attend, but ran late, so McQueen started the show without them.

Sam Gainsbury oversaw production while Katy England managed styling. Hair and make-up are credited to Barnabe and Topolino, respectively. (Note: Both are mononymous.) Simon Chaudoir was responsible for lighting. It was the first show which Sarah Burton worked on; she eventually became McQueen's right-hand woman and succeeded him as the McQueen label's creative director. At this stage, her role was to finish garments once McQueen had designed and cut the patterns.

=== Staging and styling ===
McQueen asked his friend and collaborator Simon Costin to take care of set design. The men wanted to challenge the audience, and the increased budget from the Tanqueray sponsorship allowed them enough leeway to experiment with more elaborate concepts. McQueen had recently attended the Saatchi Gallery and viewed 20:50, an art installation by Richard Wilson which consists of a room filled to waist height with black oil, except for a short inset walkway that allows the audience to walk into the space. He wanted to replicate the still, reflective look of Wilson's work for the stage of the La Poupée runway show. After some testing, Costin discovered that the floors in the Horticultural Hall did not vibrate and decided it was possible.

He had a large plywood frame constructed to serve as the stage floor: it was 150 feet (46 m) long, 20 ft (6 m) wide, and 2 ft (0.6 m) feet deep. He lined it with black plastic to give it the black mirrored look of 20:50. On the day of the show, the frame took five hours to fill with water. Broken mirrors behind screens bounced light onto the ceiling, creating a ripple effect. Costin was forced to include Tanqueray's logo in the set, at their request, but put it in black on a black background so it was invisible.

Models wore clear plastic platform shoes so they appeared to be walking on the water, inspired by Biblical stories of Jesus doing the same. Their make-up combined natural with dramatic elements: eyelids and lips were left neutral, but a thick air-brushed line of glittery metallic colour – mostly cool tones like silver and blue – was swept from temple to temple across the nose and cheekbones. Hair and wigs were styled to be artificial-looking to evoke a doll-like appearance. Models were given long false nails evoking a "dragon lady" stereotype. McQueen directed the models to exaggerate their movements provocatively and theatrically. Most runway shows required models to simply walk the runway to present the clothing, but McQueen wanted an element of performance art in his shows.

=== Catwalk presentation ===
Ninety looks were presented, mostly womenswear with some menswear. The models entered at the rear of the stage. Two white blocks framed the doorway, above a dozen steps the models had to descend to enter the tank. The stillness of the water made the surface appear to be a solid surface until the first models surprised the audience by stepping down into it.

Halfway through the show, Shaw entered the stage wearing the square metal frame with a see-through black flapper dress, barefoot. The frame was attached to her upper arms and thighs via shackles, forcing her to walk in an unnaturally angular position. Shaw had difficulty descending the stairs and recalled the audience applauding when she reached the bottom. She proceeded through the water slowly, swaying and waving her hands. To exit the stage afterwards, she described having to shuffle sideways "off[stage] like a crab". Backstage, Shaw had the frame removed immediately and refused to wear it for the finale. (Note: Shaw notes that McQueen agreed with her about this.)

For the finale, a model came out wearing pink trousers, with her head and torso encompassed by a polyhedral sculpture made of steel rods and transparent fabric. Live butterflies fluttered within. It was created by Simon's brother Anthony Costin. McQueen described it as inspired by the upcoming turn of the millennium; he thought people in the future might begin to carry their homes with them "like a snail would". The show concluded with a standing ovation.

== Reception ==
La Poupée garnered positive reviews upon its debut. Author Andrew Wilson describes the contemporary response as "ecstatic", while Katherine Gleason felt it was another instance of McQueen presenting a controversial runway show with positively-reviewed clothes. Critics were pleased with the innovative cutaways and silhouettes, as well as the theatrical runway show. Several named it as one of the best shows, if not the best, of London Fashion Week that season. At the time of the show, McQueen's Givenchy appointment was not publicly confirmed, but rumours persisted. Some critics thought the collection proved he was capable of the job. Hilary Alexander, writing in The Daily Telegraph, felt that it confirmed McQueen as the most creative designer working in England, or "possibly in the world". McQueen's runway theatrics drew positive commentary. Leane Delap of The Globe and Mail felt she could "trust the integrity of [McQueen's] artistic vision"; his unsophisticated personality made his showmanship seem creatively genuine rather than calculated to draw attention. New York Times critic Amy Spindler described the audience's reaction to seeing the designs dragged through water as similar to watching a great art piece be destroyed.

Most critics agreed that the designs were wearable yet creative. The draped, asymmetrical dresses were a romantic highlight for many, especially including one sheer mesh dress with dragon embroidery. Suzy Menkes of the International Herald Tribune appreciated the use of asymmetry and structure to create sex appeal. Several critics remarked on the ingenuity of the provocative zipper elements. Robert O'Byrne from The Irish Times identified matching trouser suits, jumpsuits, and bias-cut evening dresses as being on trend for the season. Gabrielle Williams, also from The Irish Times, took insects to be the main theme of the collection, comparing the models to moths and describing the delicate garments as "more sinuous than sensuous". Menkes thought the final look was a reference to the 1992 A. S. Byatt book Angels and Insects. Roger Tredre of The Observer appreciated the experimental zips and cuts as fashion, but doubted most women would find them wearable.

The show's accessories were divisive. Susannah Frankel, writing for The Guardian, pointed to the accessories and set decoration as examples of McQueen's increasing talent for shock tactics. Menkes described them as intentionally "disturbing" but suggested that this was "a reflection of our nasty world". Spindler was satisfied to report that they still had "the power to make his audience cringe" at the shocking styles. While Lynn Barber of The Observer liked the show, she considered the metal accessories "horrible".

Shaw's appearance in the metal frame caused significant controversy; McQueen was accused of shackling her like a slave and exploiting her. Fashion writer Iain R. Webb recalled it as "uncomfortable to watch". Designer Antony Price said that although the frame was an interesting idea, "no one really got it". Writing at the time of the show, Frankel felt it was unfortunate that the putative reference to slavery or misogyny had been the primary takeaway for the audience, rather than the designs. McQueen publicly denied any connection to slavery, explaining that he wanted to make Shaw's movements unnatural, like a marionette, as a reference to Bellmer's dolls. He dismissed the idea that the restrictive items were intended to actually be worn in real life, saying that the point was for people who understood fashion to recognise the beauty of the clothes beneath. In a 2014 interview, photographer Nick Knight, a frequent McQueen collaborator, described the controversy over the frame as people interpreting it "through their own particular prejudices" and sensitivities. Writing in 2015, curator Claire Wilcox thought the controversy had overshadowed the "sophistication and elegance" of the collection's designs. The same year, I-D deemed Shaw's appearance in the frame as one of the defining looks of McQueen's career.

La Poupée is well-remembered in retrospect. Author Katherine Gleason described it as "shocking – both hideous and beautiful at the same time". McQueen's biographers Judith Watt and Dana Thomas each commented on the wearable, commercial designs that formed the backbone of the collection. Vogue called it the most provocative of McQueen's 1990s shows. A 2022 British Vogue article called it one of McQueen's "most fantastical catwalk moments".

== Analysis ==
=== Subversion and deathliness ===
Bellmer La Poupée is noted for its subversion of fashion norms. Wilcox wrote that, like Bellmer, McQueen's work often "manipulated the tropes of fashion in sometimes disturbing though exhilarating ways". Writing separately, theorist Caroline Evans concurred, noting that McQueen's interest was in exploring taboos relating to the human body that fashion normally avoided. She tied the inspiration from Bellmer's dolls, disjointed and remade, to McQueen's tendency to juxtapose themes of death and sexuality, although she noted that his interpretation of Bellmer's work was not literal. Fashion historian Ingrid Loschek argued that the association between the collection and Bellmer's work was less clear than in "Fashion-Able", a photo project McQueen had worked on with Nick Knight which featured photographs of disabled models. Liliana Pomazan cited the extreme styling in La Poupée as an example of fashion's turn toward an ugly or transgressive aesthetic at the end of the twentieth century.

Authors commented on the collection's themes of life and death, particularly as communicated through the use of water. Wilson thought the butterfly enclosure from the end of the show was intended to demonstrate the transience of life. He also suggested the use of water was a reference to a friend of Katy England's, David Mason, who had committed suicide by jumping into the River Thames; the show was dedicated to his memory. Loschek felt the runway show depicted the closeness of life and death: water is associated with life, but the restraints on the models signified danger. Theorist Mélissa Diaby Savané identified "death and madness" as recurring themes for McQueen's shows, which he presented both in his designs and in the runway theatrics. She cited La Poupée as an example, characterising it as having "a feeling of paralyzing terror and restraint" created overtly by the unnatural movements forced by the frames, but also by the tight skirts and high heels, which restrained the body and movement in less obvious ways. She wondered if McQueen was denouncing "the prison" of beauty standards or simply expressing his own "transgressive" thoughts.

Cultural theologian Robert Covolo discussed La Poupée from a lens of Christian philosophy, arguing that it was the first of McQueen's shows to present what he called "miraculous bodies – beautifully dressed women enacting the impossible". Through his designs and runway shows, McQueen attempted to force audiences to look beyond what is normally conveyed by fashion to confront difficult truths. In La Poupée, McQueen used Shaw's performance to challenge "the fascism of fashion" and what Covolo describes as its inability to portray interior truths.

=== Accessories and their affect on the models ===
The jewellery and accessories in the show, especially the frames, have been subject to much critical analysis. Ana Honigman felt that Honor Fraser's necklace resembled a "chic version of the Grim Reaper's sickle" in the process of decapitation. The contrast of delicate fabric and aggressive metal accessories for her emphasised the models' vulnerable skin, but their confidence in this exposed state made it feel to her like "a show of strength". Evans described the frames created by Leane as "objects with agency" – things that, by design, make something happen in a particular way. The arm frame, for example, forced the wearer "to walk in a distinctive and ungainly way". Henrique Grimaldi Figueredo used the frames and extreme jewellery in La Poupée as an example of how McQueen portrayed a connection "between beauty rituals and death". Jonathan Faiers concentrated on the quill headpieces Rees had made, describing them as exemplifying McQueen's unique incorporation of nature in his shows. Each was, he wrote, "a device that allows its wearer to become part bird, part deer, part prisoner, part warrior, simultaneously trapped and weaponised."

You can't stop her! She moves beautifully with the hands, the shoulders, she moves how she can. She is in control of it. Who is she? She is locked up, but she is fucking powerful.

— Film-maker Ruth Hogben on Shaw's performance

In a separate essay, Wilcox cited La Poupée as an example of how challenging McQueen was to model for compared to other designers. His demand for aesthetic control and energetic performances sometimes provoked a backlash from critics, who accused him of misogyny. McQueen argued against this charge in general; in the case of La Poupée, he said his intent was to push the body to its extremes for artistic purposes. He felt it was a designer's job "to transcend what fashion is and what it could be". Frankel argued that McQueen's women "were powerful, even terrifying", and noted that models typically expressed that working with him felt like "empowerment". Film-maker Ruth Hogben agreed.

Theorist Shirley MacWilliam was strongly critical of the frame, arguing that it "overtly invokes sexual and racial enslavement". She based this argument on several aspects: Shaw's selection as one of the only black women in the show, that she wore a "rag-like" mesh dress and no shoes, and that the harness impeded her movement and held her legs open. She similarly criticised a film of a 1997 photoshoot in which model Laura de Palma wore the harness, comparing it to "a scene of medieval torture, then the set of a horror-porn film, then a gynaecological procedure". MacWilliam built on the work of feminist scholar Sheila Jeffreys, who described McQueen's designs as misogynistic and featuring "considerable egregious cruelty", to dismiss McQueen's defence of the harness as "chicanery". She concluded that the "harness demonstrates how art and fashion interact in the constraint, torture and degradation of women".

Franziska Bork Petersen used Bellmer to examine how a model's physical body is in "dialogue" with items worn on the runway, creating a unique performance. She noted that many aspects of the Bellmer runway show referenced the uncanny artificiality of dolls which Bellmer had explored. Models moved and posed mechanically, and their unusual make-up gave their faces an artificial appearance. One squeezed her breasts and buttocks in imitation of a sex doll. Recurring bright pink elements suggested the fashion doll Barbie. Some models appeared in pairs, with identical outfits and synchronised movements, suggesting replication. She was especially interested in how the frames "compromised" the models' agency by altering their movements. As a Black woman, Shaw's performance was additionally filtered through the perspective of the audience, who interpreted it in light of "a specific history" of Black people's bodies being denied agency.

=== Comparison to Voss ===
Some authors have connected Bellmer La Poupée with another McQueen collection, Voss (Spring/Summer 1999). Andrew Wilson compared their respective finales. Voss ended with a nude woman in an enclosure full of moths, and was inspired by the work of Joel-Peter Witkin, a photographer whose work, like Bellmer's, is both surreal and macabre. He thought McQueen may have seen a similarity between the work of two photographers whom he admired. Fashion theorist Alma Hernandez Hernandez Briseño argued that these shows blurred the line between fantasy and reality. In her view, La Poupée "presented the conflict between the real body and the unnatural, plastic body" in several ways. The reflection of the runway in the water created an unreal space. The use of silk and metal, the distorting eye make-up, and the unusual accessories all made the models appear to be doll-like. The exaggerated, performative movements of the models blended the fictional doll identity with the reality of the fashion show. Finally, the surreal image of the moth enclosure in the finale was a last touch of unreality before the show ended and real life resumed.

== Legacy ==
The mouthpiece worn in Look 1, which is held in the mouth like a horse's bit and wraps around the ears to extend forward into two points, featured in an editorial for The Face by Sean Ellis. Nick Knight photographed Devon Aoki wearing a version of Look 62, one of the funnel-necked cocktail dresses, for the Spring 1997 issue of Visionaire. He also photographed Laura de Palma in the metal frame Shaw had worn on the runway for the same issue. After seeing this editorial, Icelandic singer Björk commissioned McQueen, Knight, and England to provide art direction for her 1997 album Homogenic. The album's cover features Björk wearing a custom silk brocade kimono gown by McQueen.

Shaw has maintained that the show was a positive experience for her. She told Dazed magazine she did it partly because she thought it would "put [her] name on the map". In an interview with Dana Thomas for her book Gods and Kings (2015), she said "I felt like my body was in a picture frame." She stated that she felt pride in her ethnic background, and said she "would never do anything that would be humiliating." In 2024, Shaw spoke to British Vogue about her experiences with McQueen, including La Poupée, saying: "Wearing his clothes made me feel empowered! Statuesque! Mighty! Extraterrestrial! And they helped me come to a greater understanding of the frame of my own body".

=== Later shows ===
McQueen used Surrealist photography as inspiration in many later shows. Sometimes he simply incorporated images, as he did in Eshu (Autumn/Winter 2000), which featured a vest printed with a 1932 Wanda Wulz photograph that superimposes the artist's portrait with her cat. Other designs more literally embodied these images. A runway look from No. 13 (Spring/Summer 1999) replicated a 1936 fashion photograph in which the model is surrounded by a coil of wire, while the finale of Voss recreated the 1983 Witkin photograph "Sanitarium".

La Poupée was the first of many McQueen shows to incorporate water in some way; he had a lifelong affinity for it and was an avid swimmer and diver. Untitled (Spring/Summer 1998) and Eye (Spring/Summer 2000) both used water features on their runways, and the advertising campaign for Supercalifragilisticexpialidocious (Autumn/Winter 2002) depicted a model suspended in a water-filled vessel. His final fully realised collection, Plato's Atlantis (Spring/Summer 2009), envisioned humanity evolving to become aquatic in flooded post-climate change world.

McQueen returned to Japanese motifs and silhouettes, particularly the kimono, in a number of future collections: Voss (Spring/Summer 2001), Scanners (Autumn/Winter 2003), and It's Only a Game (Spring/Summer 2005). Claire Wilcox thought McQueen made use of the kimono in this and other collections because it could easily be made modern while being grounded in a tradition of "exquisite material and craftsmanship".

=== Red carpet and museums ===
Actress Jourdan Dunn wore Look 22, a black jumpsuit with a plunging V-neckline, for a red carpet event in February 2024. Emily Chan of Vogue noted that it was on trend with similar necklines seen at Paris Fashion Week that season. She quoted Cherie Balch of vintage fashion archive Shrimpton Couture explaining that McQueen "was so ahead of his time" that his archival designs "have this uncanny ability to feel of the moment" despite their age.

The Metropolitan Museum of Art (the Met) in New York City owns the white suit with tyre track print from Look 63. It also owns two other unspecified looks from the collection, a jacket and a jumpsuit. The Victoria and Albert Museum (the V&A) owns the pink jumpsuit from Look 23. The National Gallery of Victoria owns Look 18, a black jacket with trailing sleeves and a gold patterned skirt with thigh-placed zipper, and one of the pink quill headpieces.

Alexander McQueen: Savage Beauty, a retrospective exhibition of McQueen's designs shown in 2011 at The Met and in 2015 at the V&A, featured two black jackets and a black jumpsuit from La Poupée. Two of the Dai Rees headpieces appeared as well: a brown leather chin strap with white quills and a black glitter quill headdress.

== Bibliography ==
- Barber, Lynn (1998). Demon Barber. London: Viking Press. ISBN 0670853542.
- Bolton, Andrew (2011). Alexander McQueen: Savage Beauty. New York City: Metropolitan Museum of Art. ISBN 978-1-58839-412-5.
  - Frankel, Susannah. Introduction. In Bolton (2011), pp. 17–27.
- Callahan, Maureen (2014). Champagne Supernovas: Kate Moss, Marc Jacobs, Alexander McQueen, and the '90s Renegades Who Remade Fashion. New York City: Touchstone Books. ISBN 978-1-4516-4053-3.
- Covolo, Robert (June 2014). "Beyond the low-rise jean: Traces of resurrection on the catwalks of the late Alexander McQueen". The Other Journal (23: Body). Wipf and Stock Publishers: 30–37. ISBN 978-1-63087-237-3.
- Evans, Caroline (2003). Fashion at the Edge: Spectacle, Modernity and Deathliness. New Haven, Connecticut: Yale University Press. ISBN 978-0-300-10192-8.
- Faiers, Jonathan (January–February 2023). McColm, Donna (ed.). "Re-make/Re-model". NGV Magazine. No. 38. pp. 26–32.
- Fairer, Robert; Wilcox, Claire (2016). Alexander McQueen: Unseen. New Haven, Connecticut: Yale University Press. ISBN 978-0-300-22267-8. OCLC 946216643.
- Gleason, Katherine (2012). Alexander McQueen: Evolution. New York City: Race Point Publishing. ISBN 978-1-61058-837-9. OCLC 783147416.
- Grimaldi Figueredo, Henrique (November 2020). "Performing the Risk: Four Contemporary Obituaries in Alexander McQueen". Conceição/Conception. 9: 1–18. doi:10.20396/conce.v9i00.8659720. ISSN 2317-5737.
- Hernandez Briseño, Alma (June 2020). "La Poupee and Voss: Alexander McQueen's heterotopias". The Fashion Studies Journal.
- Homer, Karen (2023). Little Book of Alexander McQueen: The Story of the Iconic Brand. London: Welbeck Publishing Group. ISBN 978-1-80279-270-6.
- Honigman, Ana Finel (2021). What Alexander McQueen Can Teach You About Fashion. London: Frances Lincoln. ISBN 978-0-7112-5906-5.
- Knight, Nick (15 March 2015). "Unseen McQueen: Interview: Nick Knight 3" (Interview). Interviewed by Lou Stoppard. SHOWstudio – via YouTube.
- Loschek, Ingrid (2009). When Clothes Become Fashion: Design and Innovation Systems. Oxford: Berg Publishers. doi:10.2752/9781847883681. ISBN 978-0-85785-144-4.
- MacWilliam, Shirley (2022). "Playthings and Corpses—Turning Women into Dead Body Objects: Sexual Objectification, Victimisation, Representation and Consent in Art and Sex Dolls/Robots". In Richardson, Kathleen; Odlind, Charlotta (eds.). Man-Made Women: The Sexual Politics of Sex Dolls and Sex Robots. Cham, Switzerland: Palgrave Macmillian. pp. 67–89. doi:10.1007/978-3-031-19381-1_5. ISBN 978-3-031-19381-1.
- Mora, Juliana Luna; Berry, Jess (September 2022). "Creative Direction Succession in Luxury Fashion: The Illusion of Immortality at Chanel and Alexander McQueen". Luxury. 9 (2–3): 117–140. doi:10.1080/20511817.2022.2194039. ISSN 2051-1817.
- Menkes, Suzy (2021). "Fashion's Military Fascination: Unsettling, Romantic Esthetic". In Granata, Francesca (ed.). Fashion Criticism: An Anthology. Bloomsbury Publishing. ISBN 978-1-350-05879-8.
- Petersen, Franziska Bork (2020). "Fashion Bodies Swinging Between The Animate And The Inanimate". In Borggreen, Gundhild; Hansen, Maria Fabricius; Tindbæk, Rosanna (eds.). Dead or Alive!: Tracing the Animation of Matter in Art and Visual Culture. Aarhus: Aarhus University Press. ISBN 978-87-7184-352-1.
- Pomazan, Liliana (March 2008). Fashion Artifice: The Body Reconfigured. "The Body: Connections with Fashion": IFFTI 2008 – 10th Annual Conference of International Foundation of Fashion Technology Institutes. Melbourne, Australia: International Foundation of Fashion Technology Institutes.
- Savané, Mélissa Diaby (June 2021). "The Fantasy of Ugliness in Alexander McQueen Collections (1992–2009): How Did Literature and the Visual Arts Inspire Alexander McQueen to Merge Sex and Horror in His Own Art Form?". Revista 2i: Estudos de Identidade e Intermedialidade. 3 (3): 95–108. doi:10.21814/2i.3157. ISSN 2184-7010. Archived from the original on 23 October 2023.
- Alexander McQueen's Spring 1997 Full Runway Show – #TBT with Tim Blanks. Style.com. 31 July 2014 – via YouTube.
- Thomas, Dana (2015). Gods and Kings: The Rise and Fall of Alexander McQueen and John Galliano. New York City: Penguin Publishing. ISBN 978-1-101-61795-3. OCLC 951153602.
- Watt, Judith (2012). Alexander McQueen: The Life and the Legacy. New York City: Harper Design. ISBN 978-1-84796-085-6. OCLC 892706946.
- Webb, Iain R. (2022). The Fashion Show: The Stories, Invites and Art of 300 Landmark Shows (2nd ed.). London: Welbeck. ISBN 978-1-80279-432-8.
- Wilcox, Claire, ed. (2015). Alexander McQueen. New York City: Abrams Books. ISBN 978-1-4197-1723-9. OCLC 891618596.
  - Bethune, Kate. "Encyclopedia of Collections". In Wilcox (2015), pp. 303–326.
  - Brown, Susanna. "Nightmares and Dreams". In Wilcox (2015), pp. 284–301.
  - Evans, Caroline. "Modelling McQueen: Hard Grace". In Wilcox (2015), pp. 189–201.
  - Frankel, Susannah. "The Early Years". In Wilcox (2015), pp. 69–79.
  - Wilcox, Claire. "Edward Scissorhands". In Wilcox (2015), pp. 25–33.
  - Wilcox, Claire. "Plato's Atlantis: Anatomy of a Collection". In Wilcox (2015), pp. 83–103.
- Wilcox, Claire (2020). "Kimono Dreams". In Jackson, Anna (ed.). Kimono: Kyoto to Catwalk. London: Victoria and Albert Museum. pp. 269–286. ISBN 9781851779925. OCLC 1109797332.
- Wilson, Andrew (2015). Alexander McQueen: Blood Beneath the Skin. New York City: Simon and Schuster. ISBN 978-1-4767-7674-3. OCLC 1310585849.
