= Untitled (collection) =

1998 fashion collection by Alexander McQueen

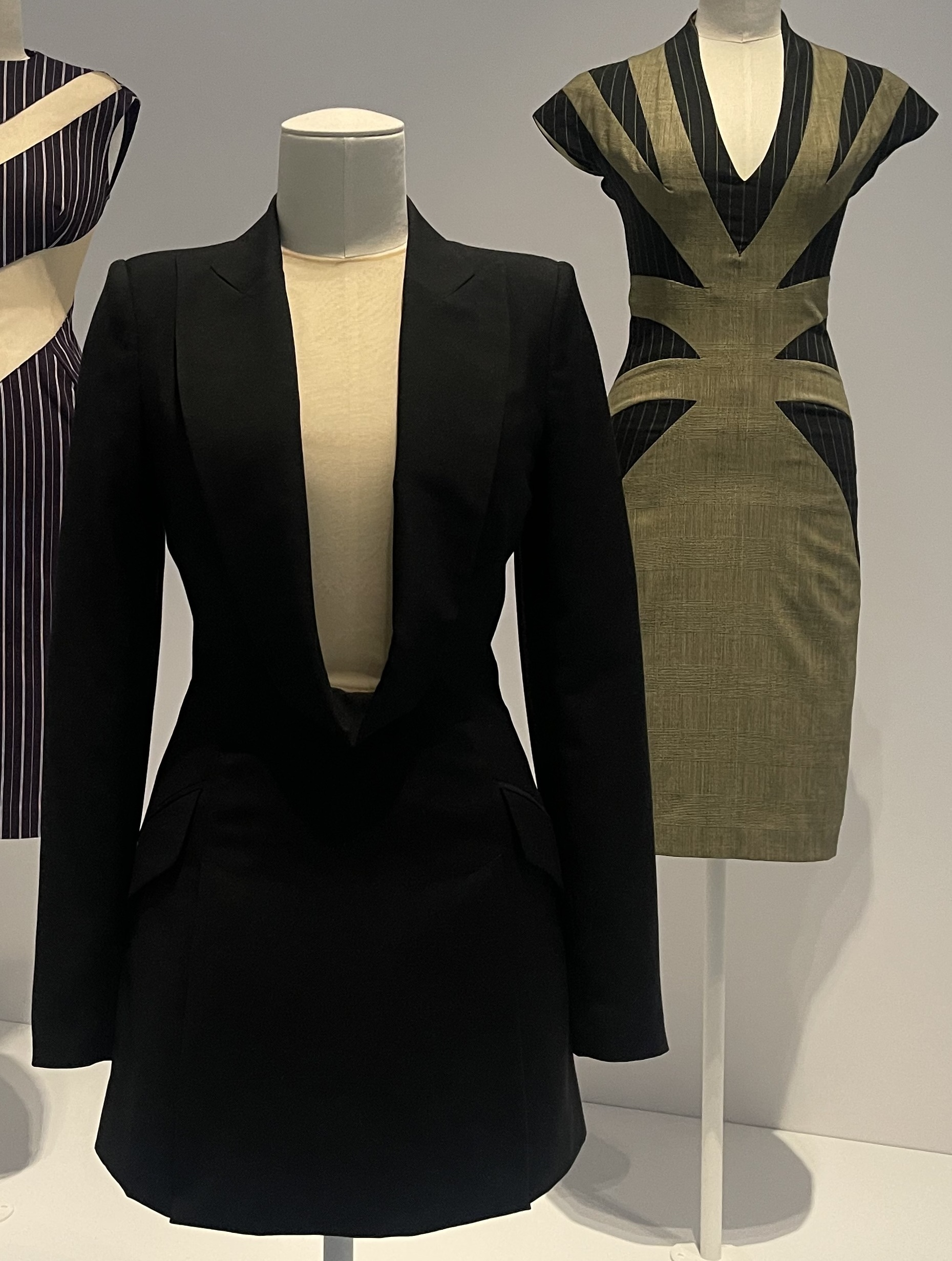
Two ensembles from Untitled at Lee Alexander McQueen: Mind, Mythos, Muse (2023). Left, a variation on Look 4; right, a variation on Look 6.

Untitled (originally titled The Golden Shower) is the eleventh collection by British fashion designer Alexander McQueen, released for the Spring/Summer 1998 season of his eponymous fashion house. The collection and runway show were an expression of McQueen's frustration with his dual positions as head of his own label and French fashion house Givenchy. There was a creative gulf between the designs he was interested in making, which were dark, experimental, and sensual, and the chic, tasteful work Givenchy expected from him. The collection reflected this with two phases: the first had provocative looks in dark shades, while the second had elegant looks in white. The prevailing themes were experimental tailoring and an erotic sensibility, showcased in unconventional tailored silhouettes, garments cut to be revealing, and glittery fringe and beading. Accessories by Shaun Leane and Sarah Harmarnee reflected the collection's sadomasochistic undercurrent.

The runway show was held on 28 September 1997 at the Gatliff Road Warehouse in London. The runway was a series of Perspex tanks filled with water, coloured to reflect the contrasting theme for each phase. For the first phase, fluorescent underlighting made it appear white. For the second phase, ink was pumped into the water to turn it black, and gold-lit artificial rain fell on the runway. McQueen had intended to call the collection The Golden Shower after the sex act, but retitled it following objections from his new corporate sponsor, American Express; he insisted on retaining the visual effect.

The clothing and runway show were well-received in both contemporary and retrospective reviews. Critical analysis has focused on the staging, themes of evolution and brutality, and the spine corset. Items from Untitled have appeared in museum exhibitions such as Alexander McQueen: Savage Beauty.

== Background ==
British fashion designer Alexander McQueen was known for his imaginative, sometimes controversial designs, and dramatic fashion shows. Over the course of his career, which lasted from 1992 until his death in 2010, he explored a broad range of ideas and themes, particularly sexuality, death, violence, romanticism, and historicism. After earning a reputation as an expert tailor as an apprentice on Savile Row, he enrolled in the master's program at London art school Central Saint Martins (CSM), graduating in 1992. McQueen's reputation for shocking runway shows began early, and his sexualised designs and aggressive styling drew accusations of misogyny. The controversy over his sixth collection, Highland Rape (Autumn/Winter 1995), is considered to be the launching point of his fame.

McQueen's work was highly autobiographical: he incorporated elements of his personal fixations into his designs and runway shows. Throughout his career, he habitually played with shapes and silhouettes, sometimes styling his models to look unnatural or inhuman. McQueen felt an affinity for water and the ocean, and many shows incorporated water features, beginning with Bellmer La Poupée (Spring/Summer 1997). He relied on a close set of regular collaborators, many of whom he had met at CSM, to produce things outside his area of expertise. He had a longstanding working relationship with jeweller Shaun Leane, who had worked with him as early as Highland Rape. Simon Costin was McQueen's set designer and art director on most of his early shows.

From October 1996 to October 2001, McQueen was – in addition to his responsibilities for his own label – head designer at French fashion house Givenchy, succeeding John Galliano, who moved to Dior. Both labels were owned by LVMH, headed by Bernard Arnault. McQueen's time at Givenchy was fraught, primarily because of creative differences between him and LVMH; his early collections there were poorly received. Galliano and McQueen had roughly parallel careers and similarly theatrical styles, leading fashion journalists to compare and contrast their work and career choices. McQueen resented being compared to Galliano, who he thought was unduly favoured by LVMH. He often sought to emulate or outdo Galliano's ideas in his own work.

== Concept and creative process ==
=== Inspiration ===
Untitled (originally The Golden Shower) is the eleventh collection by McQueen for his eponymous fashion house. It was presented for the Spring/Summer 1998 season. At the time the collection was being developed, McQueen was almost a year into his contract with Givenchy, and things were going poorly. He felt that he was not adequately supported by the management and there were persistent rumors that he would be fired before his contract was finished. There was a creative gulf between the designs he was interested in making, which were dark, experimental, and sensual, and the chic, tasteful work Givenchy expected from him. McQueen channelled his frustrations into his designs, developing Untitled as a collection based on contrasts. With the Chinese concept of yin and yang in mind, McQueen described a runway show with two phases: the first would be provocative looks in dark tones on a white runway, while the second would be more tailored and elegant in white tones on a dark runway. He intended this to reflect the dichotomy between his work for the two labels: saying "One is a prim, proper Parisian lady; the other is a mental case".

The show's staging was developed alongside the clothing; after suggesting the colour-changing catwalk, McQueen also decided he wanted to "piss on them" with a "golden shower" effect in the second half. He titled the collection accordingly as The Golden Shower but after objections from the main sponsor, American Express, the show was renamed to Untitled. Maureen Callahan reports McQueen being amused by this: first facetiously pretending to not know what the term meant, and then laughing over the change. Andrew Wilson, in contrast, quotes Simon Costin as saying that McQueen was incensed by the forced alteration. Fashion theorist Caroline Evans suggested that the show's new name, Untitled, was "an ironic parody of art titles".

=== Collection ===
The first phase of Untitled comprised darker designs in line with McQueen's personal sensibilities, with a palette of mainly black with yellow and gold accents. There was a strong reliance on tailoring, a brand signature. Many of these items used wool fabric traditionally used for men's suits, with pinstripes or Prince of Wales check, but others used cowhide or faux reptile skin. Classical tailoring techniques were adapted to create unconventional silhouettes, such as suit jackets with cowled backs. Some of these items mixed fabrics to create patterns; critics have described this technique as resembling the woodworking techniques of intarsia or marquetry.

The tailored designs were contrasted by ensembles with a distinctly erotic sensibility and underlying theme of sadomasochism: sheer black shirts and sheath dresses, stringy halter tops, and garments pieced together from what appeared to be bondage straps. McQueen's bumsters, originally a low-rise trouser that exposed the intergluteal cleft, were reworked as a shirt and skirt combination. Galliano had employed leather cut into lace-like designs in his first couture show for Dior; here McQueen used the same technique but for minidresses and trench coats. Many designs featured glitter, fringe, and beading in bronze and black.

The second phase featured all white clothing: suits and delicate, almost sheer dresses in muslin and chiffon.

Accessories were provided by Shaun Leane and Sarah Harmarnee, and reflected the sadomasochistic undercurrent of the collection. The most notable of them was Leane's aluminium spine corset, cast from a human spine and ribcage, with an added tail. It was the first large-scale piece McQueen requested from Leane; when Leane balked at the idea, McQueen retorted "Well, Shaun, if you can make it small, you can make it big. It's just as simple as that." It took Leane three months to make. Leane also provided several mouth-pieces shaped like the human jawbone, which were fitted on some of the male models. Harmarnee contributed silver-plated metal headpieces and shoulder-pieces.

== Runway show ==
=== Production details ===
The runway show was held on 28 September 1997 at the Gatliff Road Warehouse in London, a starkly industrial disused bus depot; it was the first of six shows McQueen staged there. (Note: The others were Joan (Autumn/Winter 1998), No. 13 (Spring/Summer 1999), The Overlook (Autumn/Winter 1999), Voss (Spring/Summer 2001), and What a Merry-Go-Round (Autumn/Winter 2001).) The budget is estimated to have been about £70,000 (US$110,000), with roughly £30,000 (US$50,000) coming from McQueen's new sponsor, American Express. The company was seeking to promote its Gold Card to a younger audience. In addition to the sponsorship, they commissioned McQueen to create a gold trouser suit to appear in the show. The credit sheet borrowed stills from The Messenger, a video installation by Bill Viola. There were roughly 2,000 attendees, including singer Janet Jackson.

Gainsbury & Whiting oversaw production while Katy England managed styling. McQueen's repeat collaborator Simon Costin returned for set design, with Simon Chaudoir for lighting. Nicolas Nurnjack styled hair, and Val Garland was assisted by Sharon Dowsett for make-up. Sebastian Pons, a friend from CSM, worked as McQueen's assistant. John Gosling, another regular collaborator, created the soundtrack.

=== Staging and styling ===
McQueen worked with Costin to develop the idea of a set that would change from white to black halfway through the show, expressing the collection's theme of contrasts. McQueen wanted to incorporate water into the runway, as he and Costin had done with Bellmer La Poupeé (Spring/Summer 1997) two seasons prior. They settled on a catwalk made of clear Perspex tanks, as Costin had a connection at Imperial Chemical Industries who could get him custom-sized pieces. For the first phase of the show, fluorescent underlighting made the tanks appear white. For the second phase, ink was pumped into the water to turn it black. Because this process would take several minutes, McQueen and Costin decided to insert a break in the show here. The audience would be forced to sit and watch the tanks change color; the two felt this would elevate the presentation into installation art.

Although the show's name had been changed, McQueen still wanted wanted his "golden shower" of gold-coloured artificial rain to fall on the runway for the second phase. Costin recalls him angrily telling Chaudoir "I want that water to look like piss". The effect may have been appropriated from Forgotten Innocents (Spring/Summer 1986) by John Galliano; that collection featured delicate white dresses that were styled wet and see-through on the runway.

Models were styled in a "1960s ingenue" aesthetic, with long false eyelashes and long wigs with choppy fringe. Eyebrows were hidden, and lips and skin were pale, de-emphasising these features in favour of the exaggerated eye looks. The false lashes were made from feathers shaped into fins or bat wing shapes. In the second phase, because of the rain effect, the models' mascara ran down their faces, and many of the dresses exhibited a wet T-shirt effect, clinging to the body and becoming sheer. Both phases had male models, some of whom wore skirts and corsets in what Watt thought was a nod to the appearance of corsetier Mr. Pearl in The Birds (Spring/Summer 1995).

=== Catwalk presentation ===
One hundred looks were presented – seventy in the first phase, twenty-nine in the second phase, and a final ensemble presented at the end. (Note: For convenience, when referring to individual looks, this article uses the numbering from the Vogue retrospective of the collection. Their overview counts 100 looks, but the photographs labelled Looks 70 and 71 are alternate angles of the same look, the skeleton corset. The gold suit for American Express, shown during McQueen's bow at the end of the show, is not pictured in Vogue. Look numbers mentioned in this article have not been adjusted.) The show opened with artificial thunder and lightning effects, the runway tanks lit white from below. The first phase, soundtracked by hard club music, was dark and moody, featuring reptile skin, items with laser cut-outs, garments consisting of bondage straps, and plenty of exposed breasts and buttocks. The raw sexuality was offset by tailored items in non-traditional silhouettes. Look 70, a black Lurex cocktail dress with the spine corset signalled the end of the first phase. Once the model left the stage, the music went silent as the ink started to flow into the tanks. There was the sound of rain, then the song "I Can't Stand the Rain" (1973) by Ann Peebles started, overlaid by the first notes of the theme from Jaws (1975).

The second phase started with a female model in a topless swimsuit who danced at the start of the runway while the artificial rain started to fall. Kate Moss wore one of the last looks, a sheer white muslin dress. After the last look, the rain continued, and the models came out for their final turn, walking around the outside of the runway tank rather than on it. During their walk, McQueen came out for his bow on the runway, accompanied by Shirley Malman, who wore the gold trouser suit commissioned by American Express.

== Reception ==
Untitled received a positive reception from contemporary audiences. Many remarked on McQueen's obvious learning from the Givenchy atelier. Others were pleased by the newfound sense of maturity in the designs. Harriet Quick, then at Vogue, recalled that it brought her to tears: "It was melancholy and uplifting at one and the same time. I'll never forget it." In the International Herald Tribune, Suzy Menkes described Untitled as a refined version of McQueen's best designs, but felt that despite the lack of novelty, "the fabulous presentation lived up to the hype". Amy Spindler of The New York Times felt that the show was unusually mature for McQueen, describing the staging as "gut-wrenching" in its eloquence.

The show is well-regarded in retrospect. Callahan summed it up as his "sexiest, most accomplished show yet". Chloe Fox thought it was "McQueen at his most visually ambitious". Textile curators Clarissa M. Esguerra and Michaela Hansen identified the tailored dresses as examples of how McQueen adapted traditional tailoring techniques, and the wool fabric used for suits, into experimental dresses that "reveal, conceal, and highlight parts of the body". Claire Wilcox wrote that the sponsorship helped McQueen achieve new heights, enabling him to "create the intense dramas he desired, and to commandeer the talented teams that helped realize his brave and bold vision". Wilson felt the "accessories and the staging ... lifted this event beyond the realms of a conventional fashion show".

In 2015, I-D deemed Untitled as one of the defining shows of McQueen's career. A 2022 British Vogue article called Untitled one of McQueen's "most fantastical catwalk moments".

== Analysis ==
=== Staging ===
Curator Kate Bethune identified the staging, with its runway tanks and faux storm, as showcasing McQueen's recurring interest in "the transformative qualities of water". Thomas felt that the "golden shower" theme was not just a crass reference for the sake of it, but an expression McQueen's frustrations with Givenchy: "how he believed Arnault was pissing on him, or what he wanted to do to Givenchy, Arnault, and Paris."

Caroline Evans called the "golden shower" effect an example of how in fashion, "trauma was turned into spectacle through the theatrical staging of transgression". She felt the concept used the pornographic concept of a "money shot" to promote fashion, in line with the then-current trend for fashion shows to be spectacular and even disturbing. However, she found that in Untitled, rather than being made vulnerable, McQueen's models were "armoured through glamour", and therefore were positioned as survivors of "pathology and abjection".

Film historian Alistair O'Neill argued that Untitled used sound the same way a film does, to "build suspense or drama, mark duration, and add to the film's intensity".

=== Evolution and brutality ===
Judith Watt and Kate Bethune each identified transformation and brutality as major themes. Watt contrasted Untitled with It's a Jungle Out There (Autumn/Winter 1997), feeling that both shows showcased the cruelty of nature. Where It's a Jungle concerned the survival of the fittest in Africa, she thought Untitled displayed "the emergence of amphibious creatures from primeval mud onto land". For her, the form-fitting reptile-skin dresses appeared to be strangling their human wearers. In contrast, Bethune argued that the reptile dresses seemed to transform the wearer into a hybridised half-animal figure. Watt thought the appearance of male models, some of whom wore skirts and corsets, was a nod to the appearance of Mr. Pearl in The Birds (Spring/Summer 1995). She suggested this, too, was part of the theme of evolution: not just of "men's fashion, but also of gender, too".

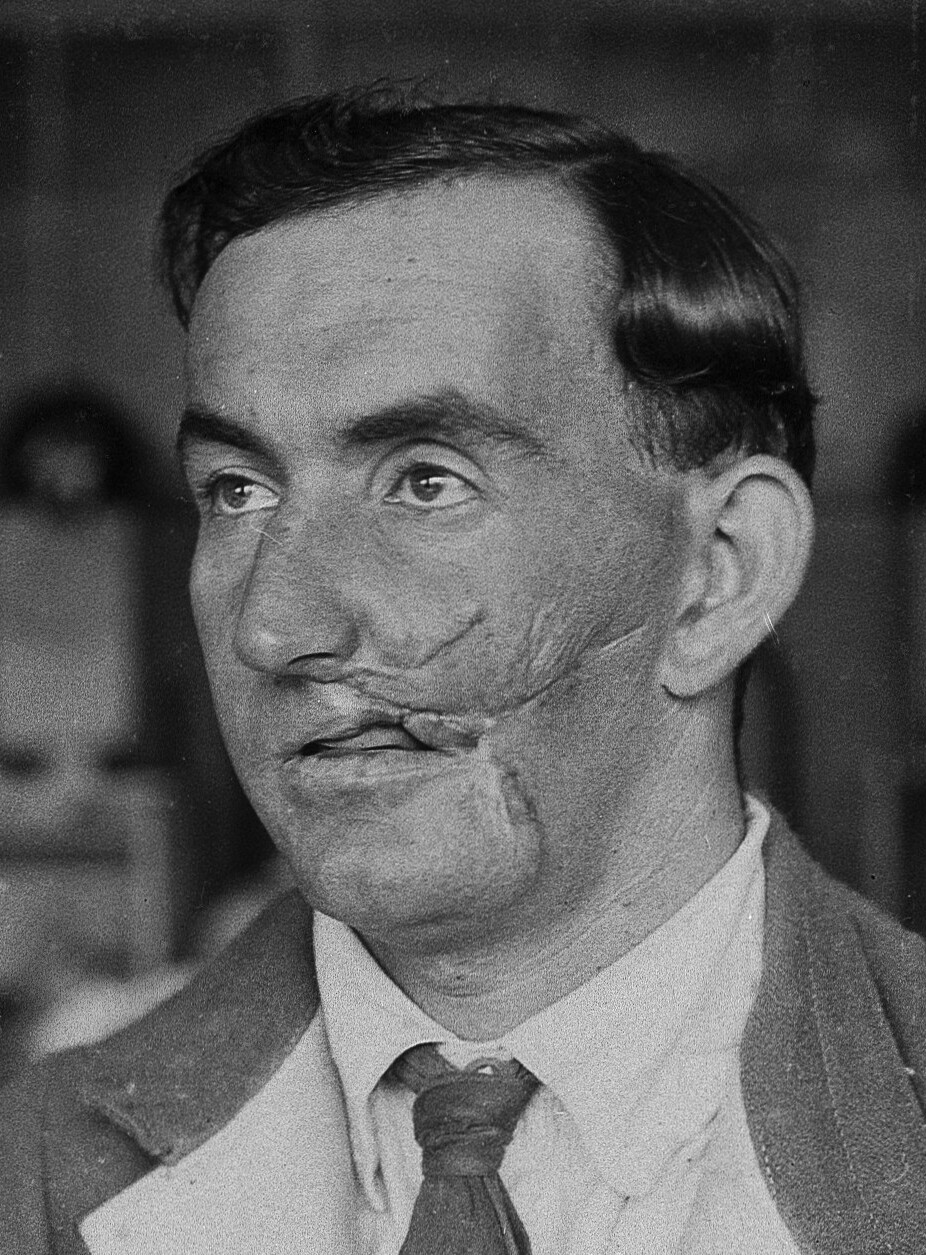
Soldier in recovery from reconstructive surgery for facial disfigurement from war wound (1918)

Both noticed the expression of these themes in the accessories by Leane and Harmarnee. The spine corset, although cast from a human body, had a tailbone which extended in a fashion they saw as inhuman. Watt saw it as representing the process of evolution, while Bethune described it as an example of hybridisation. The jawbone mouth-pieces suggested animalistic brutality, and also reminded them of early plastic surgery for war wounds; McQueen had studied photographs of these rudimentary procedures. One headpiece by Harmarnee had a blade-like extension running down the centre of the face, which to Bethune evoked the "impact of weapons on the body". Watt described Harharnee's items as "a fusion of bones and blades."

=== Spine corset ===
Critics have examined the spine corset as a memento mori – an artistic reminder of the inevitability of death. Fashion theorist Caroline Evans described one branch of 1990s fashion as having an increased focus on death imagery, drawing on the visual symbolism of the memento mori, citing the spine corset as an explicit example. Eleanor Townsend saw it, along with the skeletal jaw-pieces, as an example of how McQueen often juxtaposed death imagery "against the glamour of fashion", reminding viewers of the "vulnerability of flesh".

Robert McCaffrey, writing in The Fashion Studies Journal, contrasted the spine corset with the illusion of Kate Moss that featured in The Widows of Culloden (Autumn/Winter 2006). Although viewing both as memento mori, he saw the corset as an example of overt material horror, whereas the illusion functioned as an aesthetic horror that depended on the audience's emotional involvement for effect. Theorist Mélissa Diaby Savané considered the corset and the rain effect as examples of the "macabre and sadomasochistic aesthetic" that McQueen used to express his "obsession with death" and perverse sexuality. Catherine Spooner found it reminiscent of the metal corset worn in "Woman Once a Bird" (1990), a Joel-Peter Witkin photograph; McQueen was a fan of Witkin's work.

== Legacy ==
=== Personnel ===
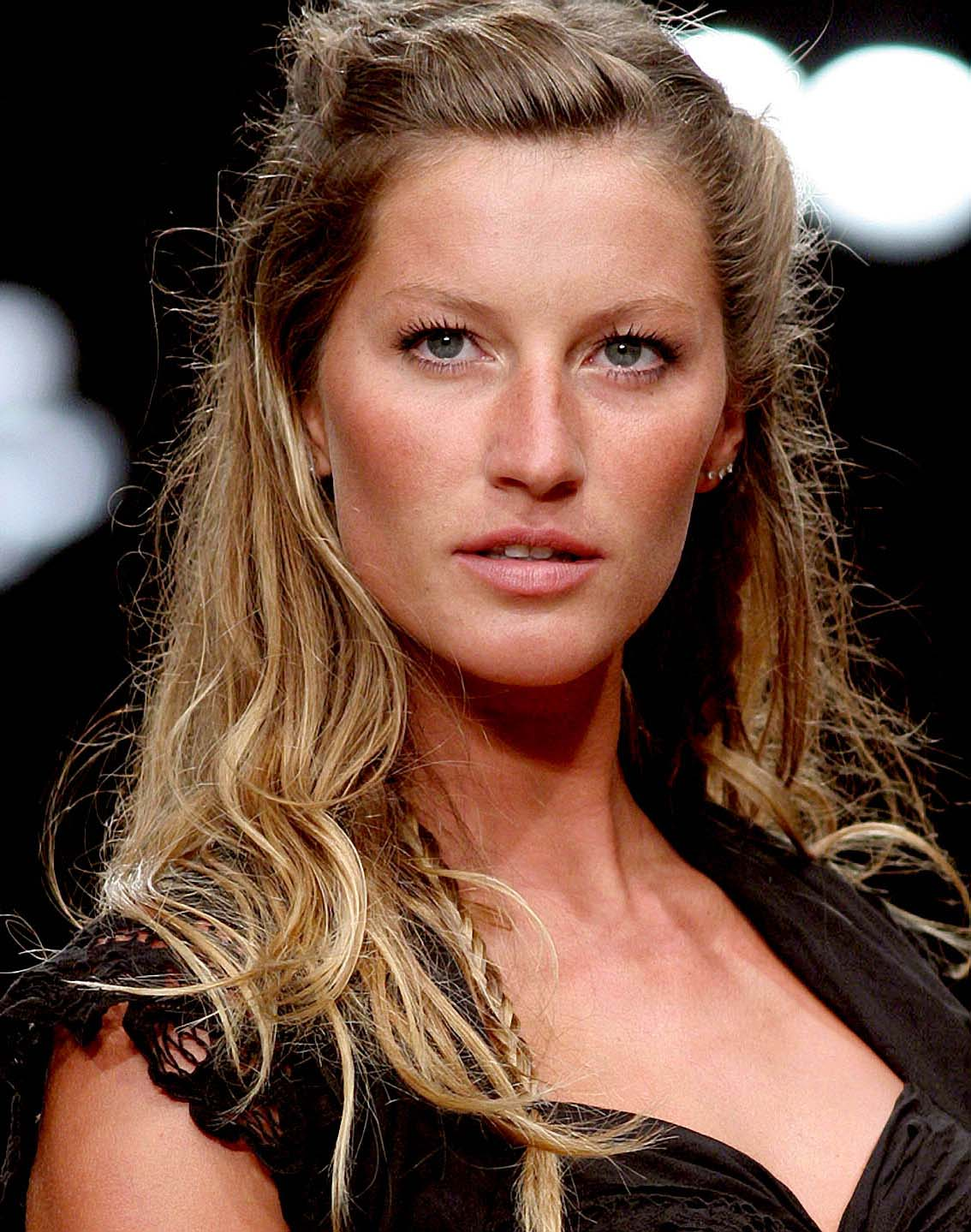
Gisele Bündchen pictured in 2006

Untitled was the last show Simon Costin worked on for McQueen. He felt that McQueen's ego had been inflated by his growing celebrity, and the people he surrounded himself with were "in danger of taking themselves too seriously". McQueen's temper had become unpredictable, leading to abrupt terminations; Costin, already growing tired of the situation, chose to quit before he was fired.

The runway show for Untitled was the first major modelling job for Gisele Bündchen. She described the experience as a difficult one in her 2018 memoir, Lessons, but looked back on it as "the beginning of my international career". At the time, Bündchen was eighteen years old and spoke limited English. There was no fitting and she was not shown her outfits nor the rain effects in advance. On the day of the show, she discovered that two of her three assigned looks were styled to expose her breasts. She was most concerned with her final outfit, a tight skirt with no top. Bündchen was upset to the point of tears and thought her parents would be "disappointed" in her, but worried that refusing to walk would end her career. Val Garland used white make-up to paint her a shirt so it would be less obvious that Bündchen was topless. At this point, Bündchen also noticed the rain effects and became concerned about falling on the runway in her tight skirt and heels. In order to complete the walk, she projected a composure she did not feel, relying on the artificial rain to hide her tears. She recalled this moment as the first time she began to differentiate between her confident public persona and her insecure inner self.

=== Museum exhibitions, editorials, and ownership ===
Alexander McQueen: Savage Beauty, a retrospective exhibition of McQueen's designs first shown in 2011 at the Metropolitan Museum of Art (the Met) featured garments and accessories from Untitled: a copy of Look 4 lent by Trino Verkade; a version of the final dress, Look 100; two headpieces and a shoulderpiece by Sarah Harmarnee; the spine corset, a jawbone mouth-piece, and a face clamp by Shaun Leane. Two dresses from Untitled appeared in the 2022 exhibition Lee Alexander McQueen: Mind, Mythos, Muse: a variation on the blazer dress from Look 4 and a variation on Look 6, a dress with "intarsia" technique. They are in the permanent collection of the Los Angeles County Museum of Art.

The Met owns one of the male jaw-pieces by Shaun Leane that appeared on several runway looks. It also owns two other unspecified looks from the collection, an ensemble and a dress. British rapper Pa Salieu wore one of the jawbone mouthpieces on the cover of the Autumn/Winter 2020 issue of Dazed.

== Bibliography ==
- Bolton, Andrew (2011). Alexander McQueen: Savage Beauty. New York City: Metropolitan Museum of Art. ISBN 978-1-58839-412-5. OCLC 687693871.
  - Frankel, Susannah. Introduction. In Bolton (2011), pp. 17–27.
- Bündchen, Gisele (2018). Lessons: My Path to a Meaningful Life. Penguin Books. ISBN 978-0-525-53871-4.
- Callahan, Maureen (2014). Champagne Supernovas: Kate Moss, Marc Jacobs, Alexander McQueen, and the '90s Renegades Who Remade Fashion. New York City: Touchstone Books. ISBN 978-1-4516-4053-3.
- Esguerra, Clarissa M.; Hansen, Michaela (2022). Lee Alexander McQueen: Mind, Mythos, Muse. New York City: Delmonico Books. ISBN 978-1-63681-018-8. OCLC 1289986708.
- Evans, Caroline (2003). Fashion at the Edge: Spectacle, Modernity and Deathliness. New Haven, Connecticut: Yale University Press. ISBN 978-0-300-10192-8.
- Fairer, Robert; Wilcox, Claire (2016). Alexander McQueen: Unseen. New Haven, Connecticut: Yale University Press. ISBN 978-0-300-22267-8. OCLC 946216643.
- Fox, Chloe (2012). Vogue On: Alexander McQueen. Vogue on Designers. London: Quadrille Publishing. ISBN 978-1849491136. OCLC 828766756.
- Gleason, Katherine (2012). Alexander McQueen: Evolution. New York City: Race Point Publishing. ISBN 978-1-61058-837-9. OCLC 783147416.
- Homer, Karen (2023). Little Book of Alexander McQueen: The Story of the Iconic Brand. London: Welbeck Publishing Group. ISBN 978-1-80279-270-6.
- McCaffrey, Robert (24 September 2020). "Alexander McQueen: The Sublime and Melancholy". The Fashion Studies Journal. Archived from the original on 21 September 2022.
- Mora, Juliana Luna; Berry, Jess (2 September 2022). "Creative Direction Succession in Luxury Fashion: The Illusion of Immortality at Chanel and Alexander McQueen". Luxury. 9 (2–3): 117–140. doi:10.1080/20511817.2022.2194039. ISSN 2051-1817.
- Savané, Mélissa Diaby (20 June 2021). "The fantasy of ugliness in Alexander McQueen collections (1992–2009): How did literature and the visual arts inspire Alexander McQueen to merge sex and horror in his own art form?". Revista 2i: Estudos de Identidade e Intermedialidade. 3 (3): 95–108. doi:10.21814/2i.3157. ISSN 2184-7010. Archived from the original on 23 October 2023.
- Alexander McQueen's Spring 1998 Golden Shower Collection-Full Runway Show. Style.com. 24 April 2014 – via YouTube.
- Thomas, Dana (2015). Gods and Kings: The Rise and Fall of Alexander McQueen and John Galliano. New York City: Penguin Publishing. ISBN 978-1-101-61795-3. OCLC 951153602.
- Watt, Judith (2012). Alexander McQueen: The Life and the Legacy. New York City: Harper Design. ISBN 978-1-84796-085-6. OCLC 892706946.
- Wilcox, Claire, ed. (2015). Alexander McQueen. New York City: Abrams Books. ISBN 978-1-4197-1723-9. OCLC 891618596.
  - Bethune, Kate. "Encyclopedia of Collections". In Wilcox (2015), pp. 303–326.
  - Evans, Caroline. "Modelling McQueen: Hard Grace". In Wilcox (2015), pp. 189–201.
  - O'Neill, Alistair. "The Shining and Chic". In Wilcox (2015), pp. 261–280.
  - Spooner, Catherine. "A Gothic Mind". In Wilcox (2015), pp. 141–158.
  - Townsend, Eleanor. "Memento Mori". In Wilcox (2015), pp. 159–163.
  - Whitley, Zoe. "Wasteland / Wonderland". In Wilcox (2015), pp. 171–175.
  - Wilcox-REFNONE, Claire. "Plato's Atlantis: Anatomy of a Collection". In Wilcox (2015), pp. 83–103.
- Wilson, Andrew (2015). Alexander McQueen: Blood Beneath the Skin. New York City: Simon and Schuster. ISBN 978-1-4767-7674-3. OCLC 1310585849.
