= The Man Who Knew Too Much (collection) =

2005 fashion collection by Alexander McQueen

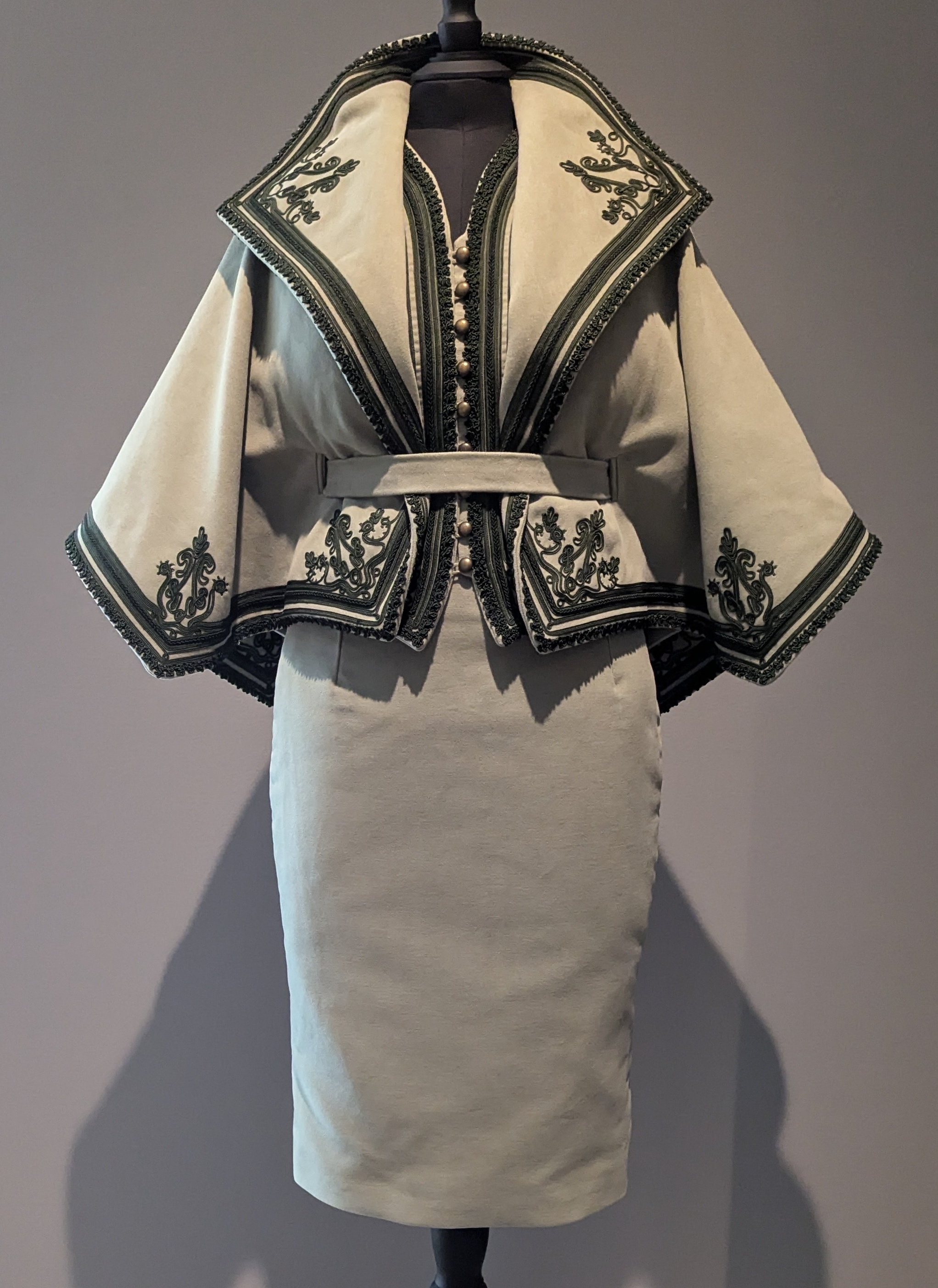
Look 3 from the runway show, presented at Lee Alexander McQueen & Ann Ray: Rendez-Vous (2024)

The Man Who Knew Too Much is the twenty-sixth collection by British designer Alexander McQueen, released for the Autumn/Winter 2005 season of his eponymous fashion house. It took inspiration from the fashion of the 1950s and 1960s. The palette was muted with pops of colour. Tailored designs emphasised the female form in an old-fashioned way, echoing the designs seen in Alfred Hitchcock thrillers like the collection's namesake, The Man Who Knew Too Much (1956). The youth culture of the mid-century was represented in jeans, leather, and leopard print items. Some of the eveningwear referenced famous gowns of the era, such as the dress worn by actress Marilyn Monroe when she sang "Happy Birthday" to President John F. Kennedy in 1963.

The runway show was staged during Paris Fashion Week on 4 March 2005 at the Lycée Carnot, a secondary school in Paris. Forty-eight looks were presented; the first thirty-six were daywear, while the final twelve were eveningwear. Models were styled and accessorised in the mode of the 1950s and 60s. The collection's clothing and runway show are considered to have lacked McQueen's signature theatricality. Critical reception at launch and in retrospect has been mixed to positive; disagreements centred around the benefits and drawbacks of McQueen's more commercial turn. It was the debut of the Novak handbag, which was a best-seller for the brand. Authors have analysed why McQueen pivoted to a more commercial approach, as well as the influence of film on the collection. Items from The Man Who Knew Too Much have featured in magazine photoshoots, museum exhibitions, and auctions of McQueen archives.

== Background ==
British fashion designer Alexander McQueen was known for his imaginative, sometimes controversial designs. Over the course of his career, which lasted from 1992 until his death in 2010, he explored a broad range of ideas and themes, particularly sexuality, death, violence, romanticism, and historicism. McQueen began his career in fashion as an apprentice on Savile Row, which earned him a reputation as an expert tailor. His fashion shows were known for being theatrical to the point of verging on performance art. Sarah Burton, his assistant during much of his career, later said that he "just didn't like doing normal catwalk shows". By the mid-2000s, McQueen had reached a stage of exhaustion with his career and the fashion industry, at one point saying, "I go in, I do my business, do the parties, and leave."

McQueen's personal fixations and interests were a throughline in his career, and he returned to certain ideas and visual motifs repeatedly. His collections were historicist, in that he adapted historical designs and narratives, and self-referential, in that he revisited and reworked ideas between collections. As a cinephile, he drew on his favourite films to inspire his collections. He was fond of Alfred Hitchcock, whose film The Man Who Knew Too Much (1956) was one of McQueen's childhood favourites. One of McQueen's earliest collections, The Birds (Spring/Summer 1995), was named for Hitchcock's 1963 film of the same name. Although the narrow pencil skirts and wasp-waisted jackets in that collection were a reference to the tightly tailored outfits worn by the film's star, Tippi Hedren, McQueen had avoided directly copying her wardrobe.

== Concept and collection ==
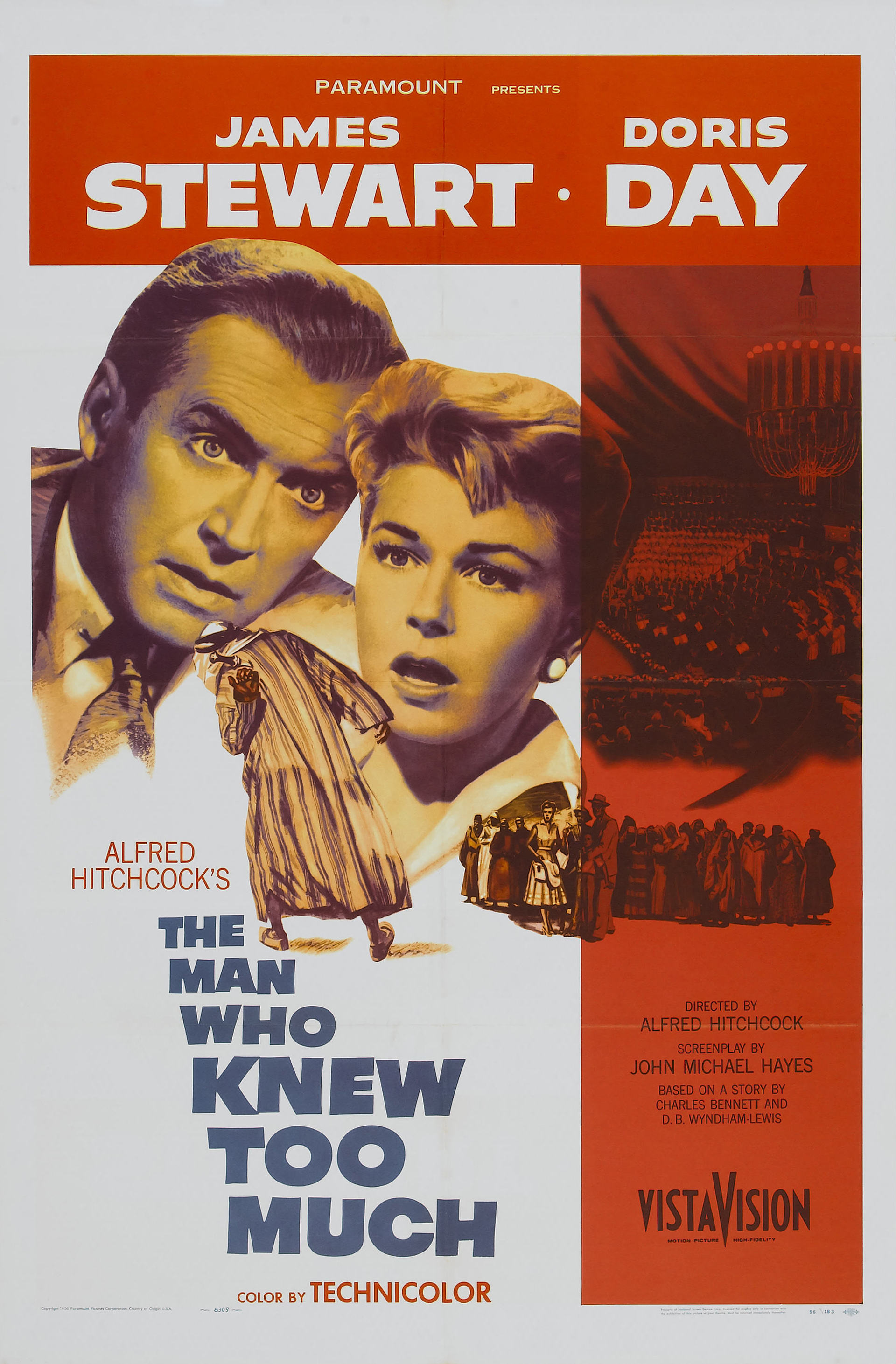
Theatrical poster for The Man Who Knew Too Much (1956), for which the collection is named

The Man Who Knew Too Much (Autumn/Winter 2005) is the twenty-sixth collection by McQueen for his eponymous fashion house. The collection, named for the Hitchcock film, was inspired by the fashion of the 1950s and 1960s. For tailored items, McQueen looked to the work of costume designer Edith Head, who had worked on several Hitchcock thrillers. With jeans, leather, and leopard print, it also drew on the youth culture that emerged in those decades and the fashion associated with the classic rock and roll and outlaw biker subcultures. McQueen cited his aunt, who had funded his fashion education, as an influence, crediting her for providing an early template for his ideas about sensuality in fashion. Author Judith Watt suggested some inspiration from the Pearly Kings and Queens of London, known for their distinctive suits covered in mother-of-pearl buttons.

Unusually for McQueen, the collection was straightforward and conventional. The palette was muted, with a focus on taupe, grey, and black, with pops of colour. The designs emphasised the female form in an old-fashioned way, with tailoring and knitwear that hugged the body, rather than relying on cuts which exposed the breasts and buttocks the way his earliest designs had. The restrained aesthetic referenced the image of the "Hitchcock blonde", a stereotype of the attractive but romantically aloof women who led Hitchcock's films.

The daywear portion of the collection mainly featured tailored tweed suits with pencil skirts, cocktail dresses, and knitwear in 1960s mohair and Fair Isle styles, shown with slim-fit trousers and jeans with cuffs. For outerwear, there were trench coats, leather jackets, and fur coats, as well as a range of sweaters and wrap jackets influenced by Peruvian textiles and Navajo weaving. Look 22, a jacket, top, and pencil skirt in wool bouclé and cashmere, is a clear homage to Tippi Hedren's outfit from The Birds, a reference McQueen had deliberately avoided making in the earlier eponymous collection.

The eveningwear portion comprised 1950s-inspired ball gowns, including a red one with a voluminous mermaid skirt that evoked the designs of Charles James, a designer from the period. The dress which closed the collection was a take on the bejewelled, flesh-toned, and skintight dress worn by actress Marilyn Monroe when she sang "Happy Birthday" to President John F. Kennedy in 1963.

Ensembles were rendered with feminine 1950s details and accessories like sunglasses, pearl jewellery, leather gloves, handbags, seamed stockings, and matching shoes. The collection featured the first Alexander McQueen handbag, a structured satchel bag with 1950s inspiration. It was called the "Novak" after actress Kim Novak, who was known for her appearance in Hitchcock's 1958 film Vertigo.

== Runway show ==
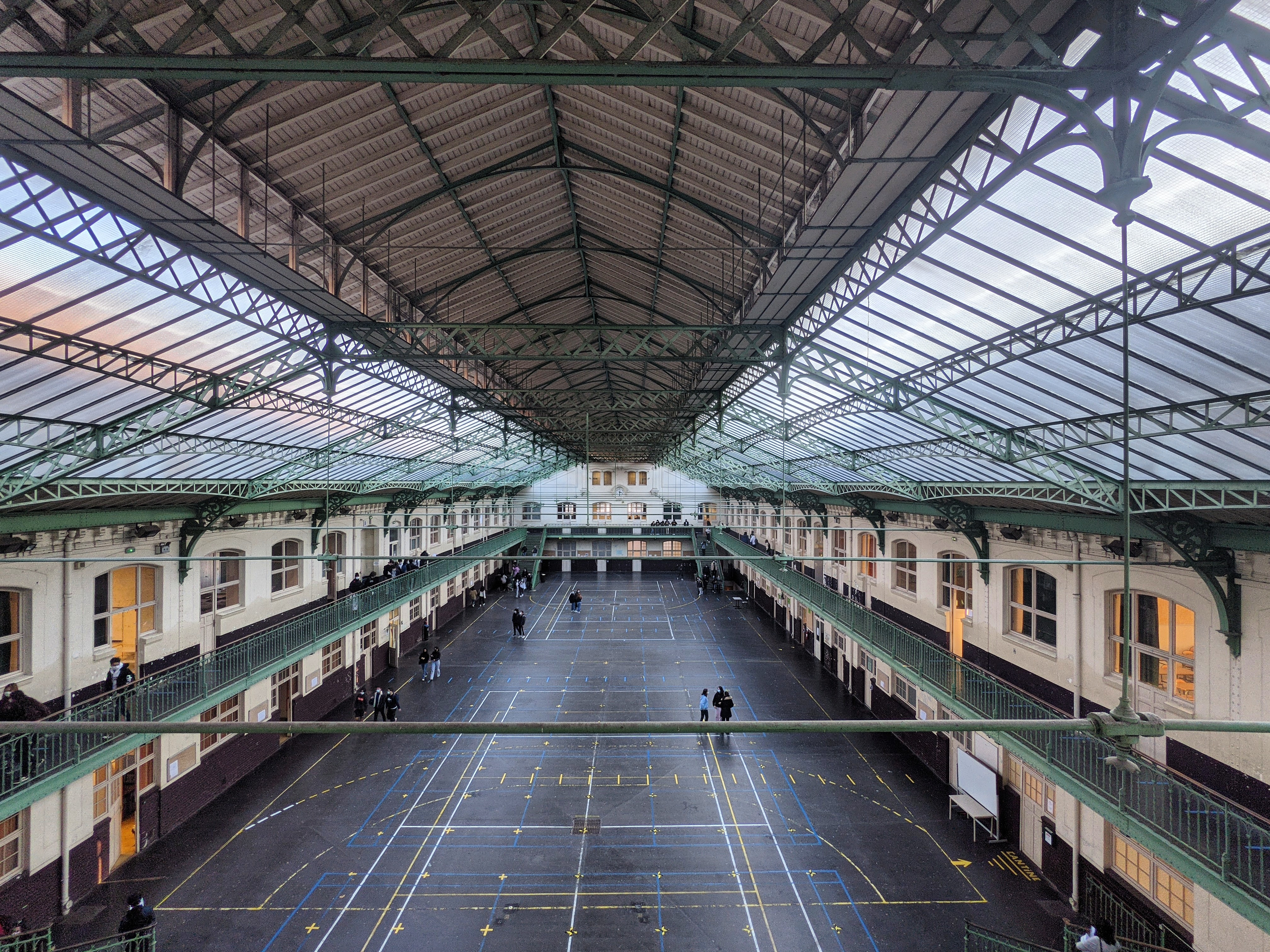
The Hall Eiffel, the central hall of the Lycée Carnot secondary school where the show was held. The runway ran straight down the centre, with the audience seated around it. Some models walked around the upper-level balcony before descending the stairs to the runway.

The runway show was staged during Paris Fashion Week on 4 March 2005 at the Lycée Carnot, a public secondary school, in Paris. The invitation was a poster based on the theatrical poster for Vertigo. The soundtrack comprised selections from the 1950s and 1960s, including songs from Johnny Kidd & the Pirates, Alan Vega, Dusty Springfield, Elvis Presley, and Martha and the Vandellas. The venue was cold, so audience members were gifted wool blankets styled like the collection's knitwear.

The show was produced by Gainsbury & Whiting. Joseph Bennett returned for set design. Katy England took care of overall styling, Guido Palau was responsible for hair, and Peter Philips handled make-up.

McQueen's usual theatrical flair was absent from the runway show; his right-hand woman, Sarah Burton, recalled it as "the nearest he came to a standard runway presentation". The unadorned catwalk ran straight down the centre of the school's central hall, with the audience seated around it. The show opened with orange-red overhead lights illuminating the runway. White spotlights flashed one by one on the upper balcony, finally illuminating a pair of doors through which the models entered. They circled the balcony, illuminated by spotlights, and eventually descended stairs at the other end to reach the runway. The windows at the rear of the room were backlit in purple. Curator Kate Bethune felt this backdrop was influenced by Hitchcock's Rear Window (1954), in which a man watches his neighbours through their windows.

Forty-eight looks were presented; the first thirty-six were daywear, while the final twelve were eveningwear. Models were styled in the mode of the 1950s and 60s. Hair was worn in period-appropriate bouffant styles or backcombed for volume. Make-up was restrained, mainly consisting of matte nude or red lips and black flicked eyeliner, although some looks had more modern graphic eyeliner above the eyelid. Eyebrows were left natural and the face was modestly powdered. Model Hannelore Knuts walked with backcombed bleach-blonde hair, red lipstick, and a false beauty mark, imitating the typical styling worn by Marilyn Monroe. Julia Stegner wore tousled hair in the manner of actress Brigitte Bardot.

After the final look, the lights went down briefly, before coming back up to show the models taking their final turn, with two in evening gowns posing on the stairs to the back of the runway. There was no theatrical finale. McQueen left the show without greeting the attendees.

== Reception ==
Hannelore Knuts wearing Look 16, styled to resemble 1960s actress Marilyn Monroe

Critical reception for The Man Who Knew Too Much was mostly positive, with some recurring criticisms. A few critics considered it one of the best of the season. Despite the lack of McQueen's usual theatrics, many reviewers were pleased with the 1950s-inspired tailored silhouettes and glamorous evening wear. McQueen earned praise for successfully updating classic Hitchcock-esque styles with modern details, avoiding an overly referential approach. Maggie Alderson of The Sydney Morning Herald appreciated the combination of "atmospheric showmanship" with sharp and sensual designs. The staff writer for Women's Wear Daily was pleased that the collection catered to a broad range of women, from "grand dame to ingenue, from party girl to beatnik". Booth Moore, writing for the Los Angeles Times, disagreed, feeling McQueen was "trying to be all things to all women". Although she admired the tailoring as skilled, The Wall Street Journal fashion editor Robin Givhan felt the tight clothes were too restrictive to be worth the trouble of wearing.

Many critics complained that McQueen had become too safe and commercial. Sarah Mower of Vogue and Suzy Menkes of the International Herald Tribune were critical of his reliance on ideas he had successfully explored before. Mower thought the runway show was repetitive and cynical, calling it "a merchandise run-through of dubious taste". Menkes appreciated the soft knits as a contrast to the stiff tailoring, but felt these items were an excessively commercial addition to a collection that was already made to be very marketable. Moore thought at least some of these items should have been cut. Some complained that McQueen's normally forceful personality had been absent from the designs. Other reviewers defended the restrained approach, arguing that the lack of theatrics put the focus back on the clothes. Susie Rushton at The Independent called McQueen's decision to send out glamorous evening gowns in lieu of a theatrical ending a "commercially savvy move".

Despite critical complaints about the commercial nature of the collection, buyers and magazine editors were excited about it. It was reportedly a strong seller on the retail market upon reaching stores at the beginning of the Fall/Winter 2005 season. McQueen defended his more commercial approach as the result of greater confidence in his designs: "You can hide so much more behind theatrics, and I don't need to do that anymore."

The mixed reception persists in retrospect. In her 2012 biography of McQueen, Judith Watt wrote that Look 39, a red ball gown, was "like a Charles James [design] but not as good". She felt that McQueen's immediate departure after the show was an indication that he was under great stress at the time. In her 2015 book Gods and Kings, Dana Thomas called the collection a "soulless exercise" indicative of McQueen's late-career malaise, describing it as a "far more literal" interpretation of Hitchcock than The Birds had been. Andrew Wilson, in his 2015 biography of McQueen Blood Beneath the Skin, called it "elegant", but otherwise spent little time on it. Some authors have been more positive. Katherine Gleason described it as "contemporary vision of wearable glamour". Curator Claire Wilcox found the collection "upbeat and commercial", and felt that it showcased McQueen's versatility in genre. Judith Watt and Kate Bethune both noted the irony that McQueen, having taken years of criticism for relying too heavily on theatrics at the risk of overshadowing the clothing, had been criticised for producing a low-key collection focused solely on the designs.

== Analysis ==
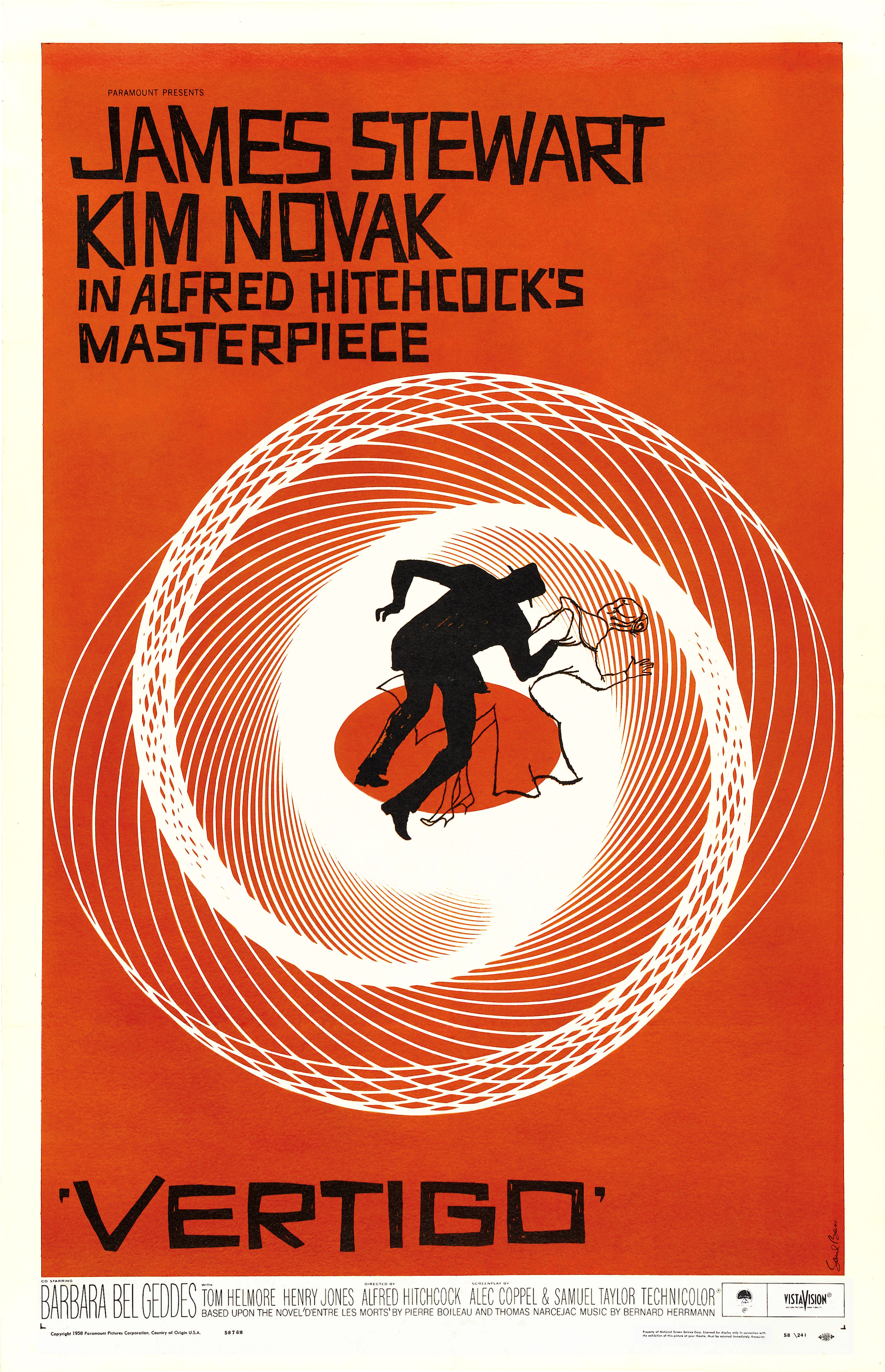
Theatrical poster for Vertigo (1958), upon which the show's invitation was based

Authors have offered a number of rationales for the collection's lack of theatrics. Watt suggested that McQueen may have felt pressured to rely on safe, saleable designs in order to satisfy the management at Gucci, which owned 51 per cent of the McQueen label. She also speculated that the straightforward design of the Fair Isle sweaters may have been intended as a lead-in for McQ, the brand's upcoming lower-cost diffusion line. Gleason suggested the rising economic influence of teens may have prompted McQueen to include youth-friendly garments like patterned sweaters and cropped jeans.

Film theorist Alistair O'Neill focused on the collection as it related to Hitchcock. McQueen referenced several of the director's films throughout his career, exploring themes of the representation and transformation of femininity. O'Neill thought the collection "distilled the Hitchcock blonde" across many looks, rewarding repeat viewing in a manner akin to film. He considered McQueen's interpretation of Hedren's ensemble to be "more faithful" to the costume designer's original sketch than what appeared in the film, labelling it "a doppelgänger".

In an essay discussing fashion and mental health, Isabel Formica Jakob described the collection as "classical". To her, this meant something timeless and antithetical to the typically frenetic, wasteful fashion industry, which she pointed out has been commonly blamed for the deterioration of McQueen's mental health.

== Legacy ==
The Novak bag became a best-seller and a trendy accessory for celebrities. As the brand's primary handbag, it was reissued in various sizes, colours, and fabrics over several years. Simone Ashley wore Look 39, a red ball gown, on the red carpet at the 2026 Cannes Film Festival.

Several looks from The Man Who Knew Too Much have been photographed for editorials in Vogue. Cate Blanchett appeared in the red ball gown from Look 39 for an editorial by Regan Cameron. Patrick Demarchelier photographed Look 38, a black floor-length dress with white tulle underskirt. Look 48 featured in a shoot by Carter Smith, where it was accessorised with a cropped tweed jacket. Paolo Roversi photographed actress Charlotte Rampling in an editorial McQueen styled for the December 2005 issue of British Vogue. The shoot was inspired by London organised crime in the 1960s and featured multiple looks including Look 8, a black minidress with lace back, and Look 48, the beaded finale dress.

Although the Alexander McQueen: Savage Beauty exhibition was intended to cover McQueen's entire career, no items from the collection appeared in the original staging. Sarah Jessica Parker, a friend of McQueen's, wore Look 48 for the exhibition's opening. The Los Angeles County Museum of Art owns two pairs of shoes attributed to the collection, which appeared in the museum's 2022 exhibition Lee Alexander McQueen: Mind, Mythos, Muse. The National Gallery of Victoria owns a pair of knitted sock boots from The Man Who Knew Too Much.

Trino Verkade, McQueen's first employee, auctioned her archive in 2014, including four items from The Man Who Knew Too Much. One silver cocktail dress, Look 43 on the runway, went for £2,200. McQueen's friend Alice Smith auctioned a collection of McQueen memorabilia in 2021; an invitation from The Man Who Knew Too Much sold for $2,440. When fashion collector Jennifer Zuiker auctioned her McQueen collection in 2020, a copy of Look 3, a sage vest suit with hunter green accents, sold for $3,438.

== Bibliography ==
- Alexander McQueen | Women's Autumn/Winter 2005 | Runway Show. Alexander McQueen. 15 March 2012 – via YouTube.
- Bolton, Andrew (2011). Alexander McQueen: Savage Beauty. New York City: Metropolitan Museum of Art. ISBN 978-1-58839-412-5. OCLC 687693871.
- Botkier, Monica (2017). Handbags: A Love Story. New York City: Harper Design. ISBN 978-0-06-242836-3.
- Callahan, Maureen (2014). Champagne Supernovas: Kate Moss, Marc Jacobs, Alexander McQueen, and the '90s Renegades Who Remade Fashion. New York City: Touchstone Books. ISBN 978-1-4516-4053-3.
- Cohan, Steve (1997). Masked Men: Masculinity and the Movies in the Fifties. Bloomington, Indiana: Indiana University Press. ISBN 978-0-253-11587-4.
- Esguerra, Clarissa M.; Hansen, Michaela (2022). Lee Alexander McQueen: Mind, Mythos, Muse. New York City: Delmonico Books. ISBN 978-1-63681-018-8. OCLC 1289986708.
- Fairer, Robert; Wilcox, Claire (2016). Alexander McQueen: Unseen. New Haven, Connecticut: Yale University Press. ISBN 978-0-300-22267-8. OCLC 946216643.
- Fox, Chloe (2012). Vogue On: Alexander McQueen. Vogue on Designers. London: Quadrille Publishing. ISBN 978-1849491136. OCLC 828766756.
- Krpan, Petra (2022). "Fashioning the Cinematic Screen: Body Transmediality, Appearance, and the 'Event'". In Paić, Žarko (ed.). Fashion Theory and the Visual Semiotics of the Body. Newcastle Upon Tyne: Cambridge Scholars Publishing. pp. 169–198. ISBN 978-1-5275-8583-6.
- Gleason, Katherine (2012). Alexander McQueen: Evolution. New York City: Race Point Publishing. ISBN 978-1-61058-837-9. OCLC 783147416.
- Jakob, Isabel Formica (18 November 2021). "On Mental Health, Lee Alexander McQueen, and Slow Fashion". The Fashion Studies Journal (9).
- Knox, Kristin (2010). Alexander McQueen: Genius of a Generation. London: A&C Black. ISBN 978-1-4081-3223-4. OCLC 794296806.
- Mora, Juliana Luna; Berry, Jess (2 September 2022). "Creative Direction Succession in Luxury Fashion: The Illusion of Immortality at Chanel and Alexander McQueen". Luxury. 9 (2–3): 117–140. doi:10.1080/20511817.2022.2194039. ISSN 2051-1817.
- Thomas, Dana (2015). Gods and Kings: The Rise and Fall of Alexander McQueen and John Galliano. New York City: Penguin Publishing. ISBN 978-1-101-61795-3. OCLC 951153602.
- Watt, Judith (2012). Alexander McQueen: The Life and the Legacy. New York City: Harper Design. ISBN 978-1-84796-085-6. OCLC 892706946.
- Webb, Iain R. (2022). The Fashion Show: The Stories, Invites and Art of 300 Landmark Shows (2nd ed.). London: Welbeck. ISBN 978-1-80279-432-8.
- Wilcox, Claire, ed. (2015). Alexander McQueen. New York City: Abrams Books. ISBN 978-1-4197-1723-9. OCLC 891618596.
  - Bethune, Kate. "Encyclopedia of Collections". In Wilcox (2015), pp. 303–326.
  - O'Neill, Alistair. "The Shining and Chic". In Wilcox (2015), pp. 261–280.
- Wilson, Andrew (2015). Alexander McQueen: Blood Beneath the Skin. New York City: Simon and Schuster. ISBN 978-1-4767-7674-3. OCLC 1310585849.
- Young, Caroline; Martin, Ann (2017). Tartan + Tweed. London: Frances Lincoln Limited. ISBN 978-0-7112-3822-0. OCLC 947020251.
