= La poupée (disambiguation) =

La poupée, meaning "the doll", may refer to:

- La poupée, an 1896 opéra comique
- La Poupée, a series of photographs by Hans Bellmer published in the 1930s
- La Poupée (film), a 1962 film
- Bellmer La Poupée, a 1997 fashion collection by Alexander McQueen
