= Mr. Pearl =

Corsetmaker (born 1962)

- Born: Mark Erskine-Pullin; 1962; South Africa
- Occupation: corsetmaker
- Known for: Corset designs for Vivienne Westwood, Kylie Minogue, Dita Von Teese

Mr. Pearl (born Mark Erskine-Pullin, 1962) is a noted corsetmaker of the late 20th and early 21st century. Pearl is known for his work with designers such as Vivienne Westwood, and has designed corsets for celebrities such as Kylie Minogue and Dita Von Teese.

== Early life and career ==
Mark Erskine-Pullin was born in South Africa to a working-class family in 1962. The young Erskine-Pullin was fascinated by corsets from a young age, particularly after his parents divorced and he was sent to live with his grandmother, who allowed him to help her lace up her corsets. He undertook two years of military service, and, for a period of time, was married to the actress Terry Norton.

After his marriage failed, and finding life in South Africa stifling, Erskine-Pullin moved to London. He became a dresser and costume designer for the Royal Opera House in Covent Garden. While there, he collaborated with Leigh Bowery on costumes for Michael Clark's ballet Because We Must, first staged at Sadler's Wells Theatre in 1987. Erskine-Pullin became Bowery's assistant and made costumes for his nightclub performances, also becoming a regular nightclub attendee under the alter ego "Pearl". Isabella Blow would later rename him "Mr. Pearl", the name by which he has been known ever since.

== Corsets ==
=== As a corset maker ===
While attending the 1989 Love Ball in New York City as a human bustle to Bowery's costume, Pearl was introduced to the designer Thierry Mugler. This led to a productive friendship and working relationship with Mugler and Pearl working together on the designer's fashion collections, and Pearl moving to Paris.

Pearl subsequently went on to collaborate with others, including regularly returning to London to work with John Galliano, Vivienne Westwood, and Alexander McQueen. Pearl met McQueen in 1995, and was asked to walk in the designer's 1995 Spring-Summer collection, The Birds, his only catwalk modelling role. He ended up creating only one corset for McQueen, a purple silk and black lace corset worn by Honor Fraser in the designer's Autumn-Winter 1996 show. This piece was subsequently exhibited in the McQueen retrospective Savage Beauty at the Metropolitan Museum of Art.

In 1997, Blow included a Mr. Pearl corset as part of the group of garments she chose to represent fashions of 1997 in the Fashion Museum, Bath's Dress of the Year collection.

One of Pearl's most widely publicised creations was the Galliano-designed corset worn by Kylie Minogue in her 2006 tour, Showgirl. The jewelled corset was widely reported in the UK tabloid media at the time as having a 16-inch (410 mm) waist, although these claims were exaggerated and Minogue herself disclaimed them. A full-length corset dress made for Jean-Paul Gaultier in 2001 is now in the collection of the Metropolitan.

By the 2000s, Mr. Pearl was regularly described as a corsetière. He had earlier stated in a 1993 interview that he did not yet consider himself a corsetière, but a designer who used corsetry and lacing in his work, and aspired to become good enough to rank alongside the handful of true corsetières remaining in the world.

Pearl eventually settled in Paris full-time, where he works on a made-to-order basis for private clients such as Dita Von Teese. Von Teese is one of his most famous wearers, regularly wearing his corsets in her burlesque performances; for her 2005 marriage to Marilyn Manson, Von Teese wore a Mr. Pearl corset under her Vivienne Westwood gown.

=== As a corset wearer ===
In addition to designing and making corsets, Mr. Pearl is notable for wearing corsets himself. At the age of 30, he was inspired to start doing so after seeing an image of Fakir Musafar with a tightly corseted waist. The designer subsequently became a dedicated wearer of waist-training corsets, removing them only for bathing. Over 22 years he gradually reduced his waist measurement to 18 inches (460 mm). In 2013, Pearl noted that he enjoyed the physical experience of wearing corsets, particularly the effects on his breathing, circulation and the pressure on his organs, and that these had an effect on both his physical and mental awareness. Other commentators have noted that Pearl, as a highly private, publicity-shy individual, uses corsets and tight-lacing to embody his true self and personal identity, rather than imposing his theories and appearance on others for publicity and self-promotion purposes.
