= Shift dress =

Type of clothing

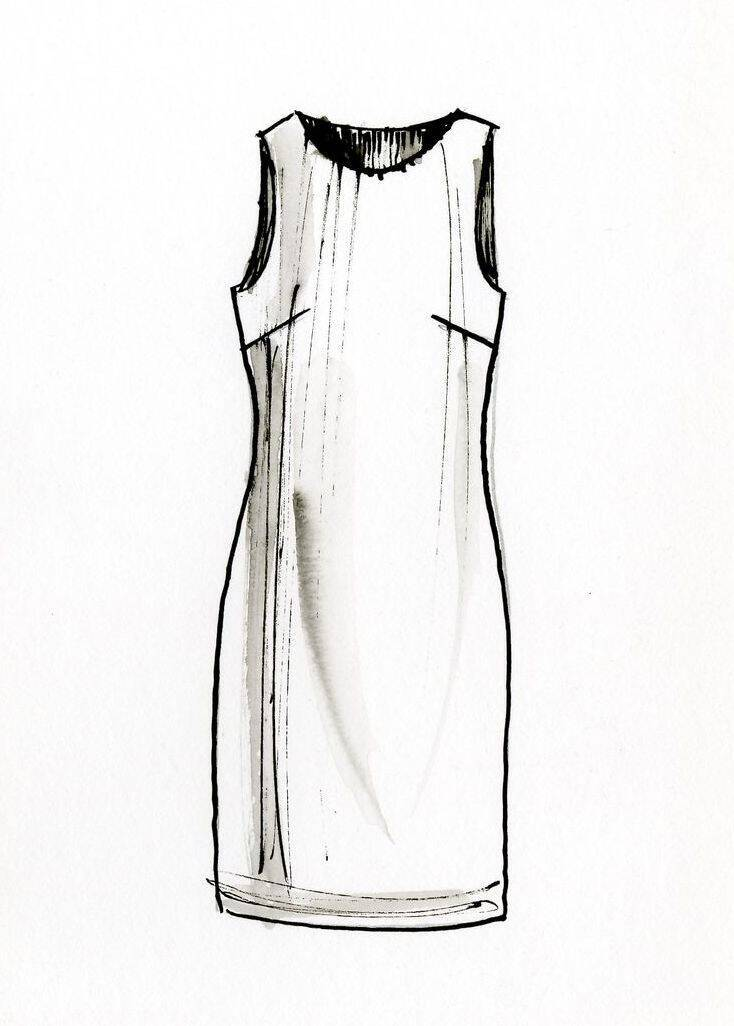
A drawing by David Ring illustrating a shift dress for the Europeana Fashion project. A shift dress typically falls from the shoulders, and features darts around the bust.

A shift dress is a dress in which the cloth falls straight from the shoulders and has darts around the bust. It frequently features a high scoop or boat neck. The shift dress is often confused with the sheath dress, which is form-fitting and shaped by tucks on the waist area. Shift dresses became popular in western fashion in the 1920s and were revived in the 1960s.

== History ==
The shift dress gained popularity during the Western flapper movement in the 1920s. Changing social norms meant that young women could choose a style of dress that was easier to move and dance in, and the shift dress marked a departure from previously fashionable corset designs, which exaggerated the bust and waist while restricting movement.

It went out of fashion during wartime, and the post war era, where Western women's fashion was typified by Christian Dior's "New Look", which again featured an exaggerated bust, hips and waist at the expense of comfort.

The shift dress made a comeback in the 1960s, popularised by Hubert de Givenchy's design for Audrey Hepburn's Breakfast at Tiffany's dress, and Lilly Pulitzer's designs for Jacqueline Kennedy. This coincided with the start of second wave feminism which brought in a renewed desire for freedom and versatility.
