= Amy Spindler =

American journalist

- Born: Amy M. Spindler; 1963; Michigan City, Indiana
- Died: February 27, 2004 (age 40); New York City
- Occupation: journalist
- Notable credit(s): The New York Times Magazine; The New York Times
- Spouse: Roberto Benabib

Amy M. Spindler (1963 in Michigan City, Indiana – 27 February 2004 in New York City) was an American journalist who had been style editor of The New York Times Magazine.

Spindler began at the Times as a columnist on the Style desk in 1993, then became a fashion critic a year later. In 1998, Spindler became the style editor of the Times's magazine section.

== Career ==
After graduating from Indiana University Bloomington, Spindler move to New York City and began working jobs at several Conde Nast magazines. Soon after, she moved to Paris, where she became the associate fashion editor of W Europe. In 1993, she joined The New York Times as a columnist on the Style desk. Later that year she became a fashion critic and was deemed fashion critic of the year. She became the fashion editor for The Times Magazine in 1998 but left the following November. Spindler was widely known for her criticisms of the fashion industry and her reputation as a tough reporter.

== Personal life ==
Spindler graduated from Indiana University Bloomington in 1985 with a degree in journalism. She was married to Roberto Benabib, a television producer. She died of a brain tumor in 2004 at the age of 40 in Manhattan, New York.
