= Iain R. Webb =

Iain R. Webb is a British writer, curator and academic, appointed Professor of Fashion & Design at Kingston School of Art in 2016, also an associate lecturer at Central Saint Martins and Bath Spa University.

Webb studied fashion design at St Martin’s School of Art (now Central Saint Martins), graduating in 1980. He went on to serve as fashion editor/director of Blitz magazine, the Evening Standard, Harpers & Queen, The Times and Elle, while contributing to various other publications. He won the Fashion Journalist of The Year Award two years running in 1995 and 1996. He has authored several books on fashion and the careers of, for example, Bill Gibb, Marc Jacobs and the British stylist Caroline Baker.

== Selected publications ==
- Blitz: As seen in Blitz: fashioning '80s style. Woodbridge: ACC Editions, 2013.
- Bill Gibb: Fashion and fantasy. London: V & A, 2008.
- Foale and Tuffin: The sixties: a decade in fashion. Woodbridge: ACC Editions, 2009.
- Postcards from the edge of the catwalk. Woodbridge: ACC, 2010.
- Invitation strictly personal: 40 years of fashion show invites. London: Goodman, 2014.
- Rebel Stylist: Caroline Baker, the woman who invented street fashion. ACC Art Books, 2021
