= Claire Wilcox =

British curator, academic and author (born 1954)

Claire Wilcox is a British curator and academic specialising in fashion.

== Early life ==
Claire Wilcox was born in 1954 and grew up in Fulham, England to a father who owned a shop selling wools and haberdashery and mother, a teacher. They moved to a house in Chiswick.

== Career ==
Wilcox received an honorary doctorate in art and design from Middlesex University in July 2017. She sits on the editorial board of the journal Fashion Theory. She is professor of fashion curation at the London College of Fashion. She won the 2021 PEN/Ackerley Prize for Patch Work.

Wilcox is senior curator of fashion at the Victoria and Albert Museum.

== Curated exhibitions ==
- Radical Fashion (2001)
- Vivienne Westwood (2004)
- The Golden Age of Couture: Paris and London 1947–1957 (2007)
- From Club to Catwalk: London Fashion in the 1980s (2013)

== Works ==
=== Books ===
- A Century of Bags. Apple Press, 1998.
- Modern Fashion in Detail. Victoria and Albert Museum, London, 1998.
- The Ambassador Magazine: Promoting Post-War British Textiles and Fashion. Victoria Albert Museum, London, 2012.
- V&A Gallery of Fashion. Victoria and Albert Museum, London, 2013.
- Wilcox, Claire (24 July 2018). Frida Kahlo: Making Her Self Up. Harry N. Abrams. ISBN 978-1-85177-960-4.
- Wilcox, Claire; Mendes, Valerie D.; Lister, Jenny; Cullen, Oriole; Stanfill, Sonnet (16 October 2018). 20th-Century Fashion in Detail. National Geographic Books. ISBN 978-0-500-29410-9.
- Patch Work: A Life Amongst Clothes. Bloomsbury Publishing, London, 2020.

=== Exhibition catalogues ===
- Radical Fashion (Victoria and Albert Museum, 2001)
- Vivienne Westwood (Victoria and Albert Museum, 2004)
- The Golden Age of Couture (Victoria and Albert Museum, 2007)
- Alexander McQueen (Victoria and Albert Museum, 2015)
