= Deliverance (collection) =

2004 fashion collection by Alexander McQueen

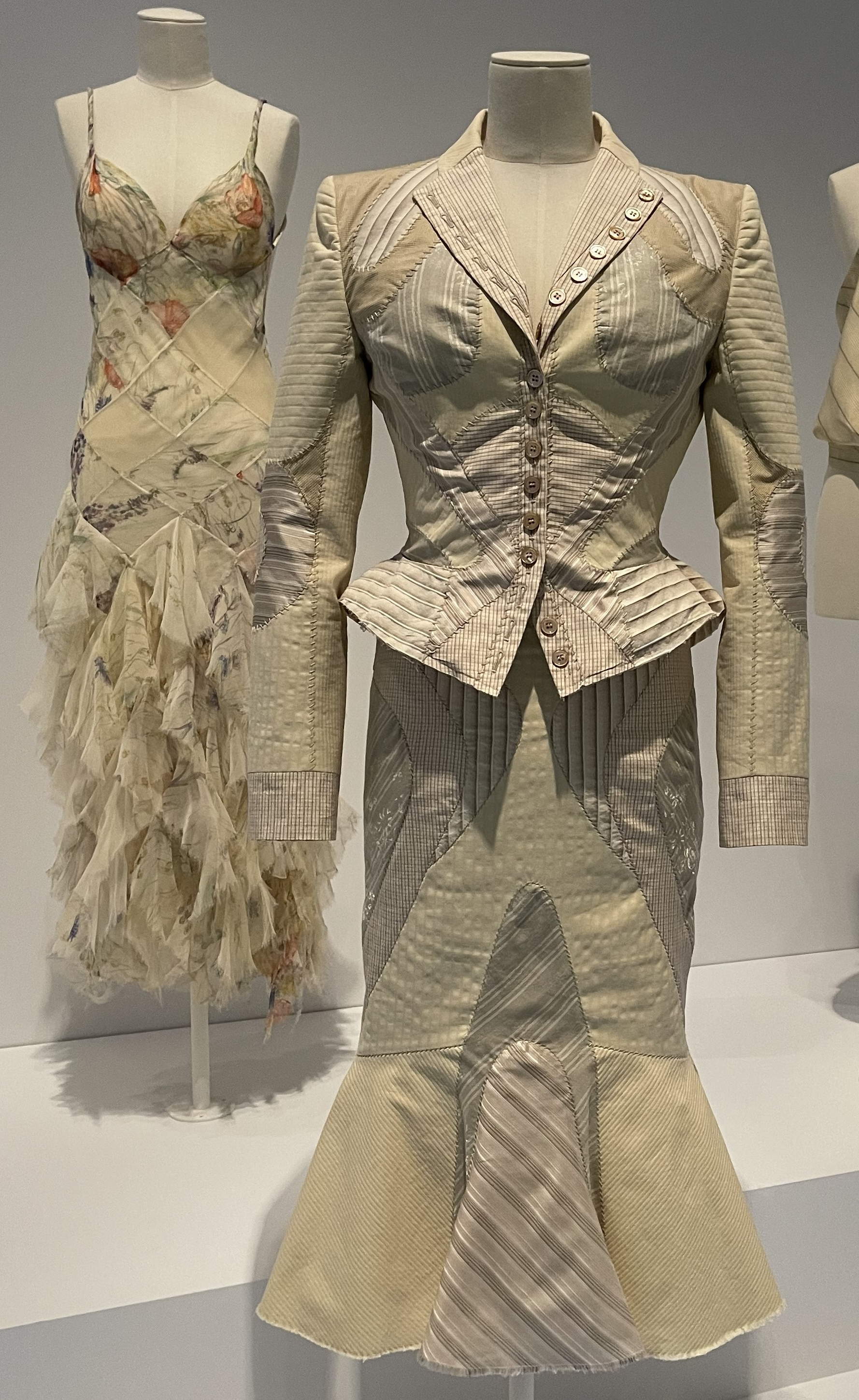
Two looks from Deliverance at Lee Alexander McQueen: Mind, Mythos, Muse (2023)

Deliverance is the twenty-third collection by British fashion designer Alexander McQueen, released for the Spring/Summer 2004 season of his eponymous fashion house. The collection was inspired by the 1969 film They Shoot Horses, Don't They?, which portrays desperate participants in a dance marathon during the Great Depression. The collection and accompanying show use the dance marathon concept to express McQueen's exhaustion with fame and the fashion industry.

The collection comprised three distinct phases inspired by the film and the clothing of the Depression: eveningwear recalled the glamour of Old Hollywood before the crash, colourful sportswear, and faded daywear in utilitarian fabrics evoking exhaustion and hopelessness. McQueen's signature tailoring featured throughout, and he returned to several concepts from previous collections; he also presented new developments such as bias-cut dresses. Menswear drew from 1930s American workwear.

The runway show was staged on 10 October 2003 at the Salle Wagram auditorium in Paris, with production by McQueen's usual creative team. Unlike a traditional fashion show, Deliverance was presented as a faux dance marathon in three phases, with professional dancers accompanying the models and choreography by ballet dancer Michael Clark. Over eighty looks were presented. (Note: At least eighty looks were presented in the runway show, counting womenswear and menswear. Precise numbers are difficult to ascertain due to the unusually dynamic, mobile production, in which numerous people were onstage at once, as well as entering and exiting during the first and final phases. Look numbers from Vogue cannot be relied upon for accurate counts as many of their photos contain multiple people or are alternate shots of the same people. Excluding clear duplicates, Vogue shows at least 42 looks from the first phase in 21 photographs of male-female couples. The official runway video shows six couples in phase two. Again excluding clear duplicates, Vogue shows at least 29 looks in phase three. Unlike in phase one, some models here are photographed without male partners.) The show ended with a model feigning collapse in the centre of the stage before being carried offstage.

Critical reception was positive, especially for the runway show, although there was some backlash to the idea of using the Great Depression as inspiration for high-end fashion. Academic analysis has considered the dance marathon theme as a symbol of death and decay, and items from Deliverance have appeared in exhibitions.

== Background ==
British fashion designer Alexander McQueen was known for his imaginative, sometimes controversial designs, and dramatic fashion shows. Over the course of his career, which lasted from 1992 until his death in 2010, he explored a broad range of ideas and themes, particularly sexuality, death, violence, romanticism, and historicism. McQueen began his career as an apprentice on Savile Row, which earned him a reputation as an expert tailor. From October 1996 to October 2001, McQueen was – in addition to his responsibilities for his own label – head designer at French fashion house Givenchy.

McQueen's personal fixations and interests were a throughline in his career, and he returned to certain ideas and visual motifs repeatedly. His collections were historicist, in that he adapted historical designs and narratives, and self-referential, in that he revisited and reworked ideas between collections. As a cinemaphile, he drew on his favourite films to inspire his collections. McQueen was fascinated with death and memento mori.

McQueen had a difficult relationship with the fashion industry, which he sometimes described as toxic and suffocating. He was often ambivalent about continuing his work as a designer. By the mid to late 2000s, he had reached a point of exhaustion with his career, at one point saying, "I go in, I do my business, do the parties, and leave." He told Vassi Chamberlain of Tatler that he felt he was "in a glass box". McQueen made several collections throughout his career that critiqued the fashion industry, going back as early as 1997. Mid-career, Voss (Spring/Summer 2001) and What A Merry-Go-Round (Autumn/Winter 2001) used imagery associated with insane asylums and circuses to portray fashion as chaotic and deranged. His second-to-last completed collection, The Horn of Plenty (Autumn/Winter 2009), satirised the concept of a runway show and the wastefulness of the fashion cycle.

== Concept and creative process ==
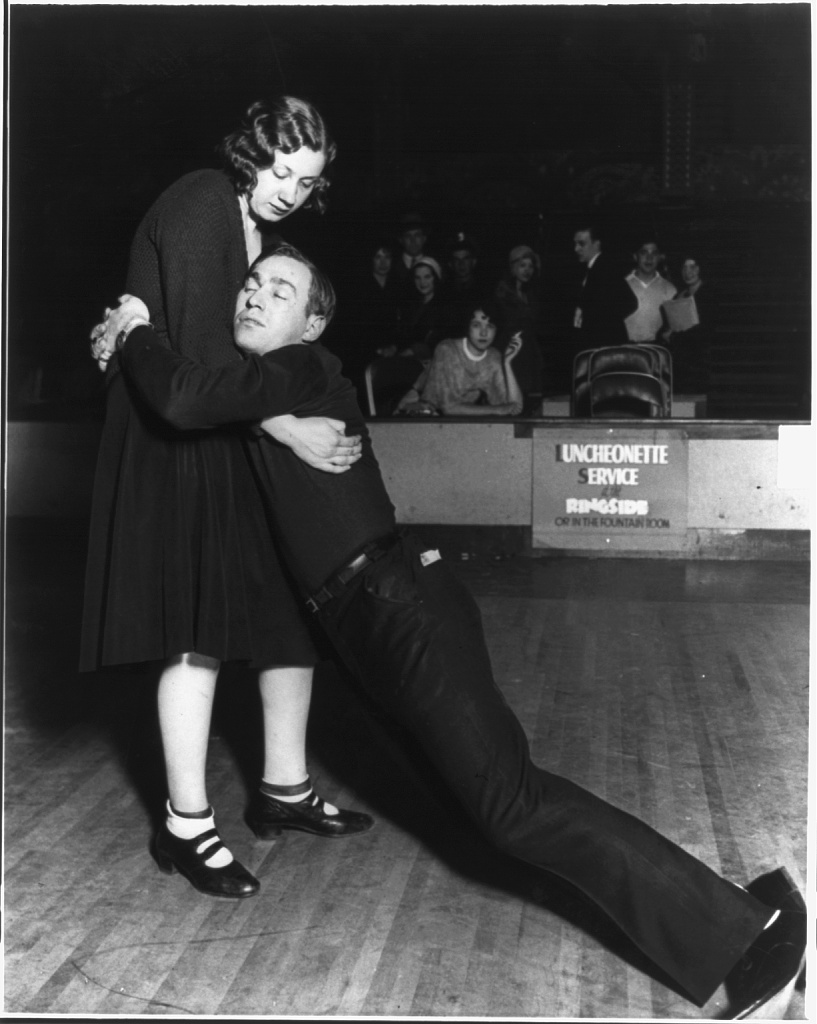
Dancer holding up her partner after he has fallen asleep during a dance marathon in Chicago, 1930

Deliverance (Spring/Summer 2004) is the twenty-third collection McQueen designed for his eponymous fashion house. The collection was inspired by one of McQueen's favourite films, the 1969 tragedy They Shoot Horses, Don't They?, which portrays a lengthy dance marathon during the Great Depression. Hoping to win prize money, the desperate participants risk their well-being by dancing for weeks on end, urged on by the affluent paying audience and the cruel emcee who runs the show. The collection and accompanying show use the dance marathon concept to express McQueen's exhaustion with the never-ending need for designers to produce new collections to drive sales. He may also have been speaking about his difficulties with success and fame; Susannah Frankel felt he was thinking of "man's futile quest for capital at the expense of dignity, and of the flawed and ultimately alienating belief that fame, money, or class leads to a better life." In a subsequent interview, McQueen described the show as a statement about his feelings about America at the time, saying "it's in a scary place".

With this inspiration in mind, the clothing in the collection is a romantic interpretation of Depression-era fashion across three phases. The first recalled the glamour of Old Hollywood before the stock market crash that precipitated the Depression. The second portion drew on sportswear. The final phase returned to silhouettes from the first, but rendered in faded colours and utilitarian fabrics, indicating the exhaustion and despair of the Depression. McQueen's customarily sharp tailoring was relaxed somewhat for the collection in order to allow the models in the runway show to move freely. Because they were meant to be in a dance competition, the men had competitor numbers pinned to their backs.

The first phase mainly comprised glamorous eveningwear as well as shorter cocktail and day dresses. Long evening gowns were shown in satin and lamé; in a new development for McQueen, many were cut on the bias to allow the fabric to flow and drape. Some had a "mermaid" silhouette: fitted to the body and flared at the bottom, resembling a mermaid tail. Other dresses had full skirts in tulle and feathers. One orange dress was cut so low in the back that it exposed the intergluteal cleft like McQueen's early bumster trousers. There were also 1930s-style skirt suits and ensembles with satin pants or crystal-studded stockings. Swarovski crystals, sequins, beads, embroidery, and feathers were all used for embellishments. In this phase, the competitor numbers were rendered in crystal. Some ensembles were accessorised with feather boas.

The sportswear phase featured bright colours and loud patterns, all with minimal tailoring to encourage movement. Models wore tight bodysuits, sequinned hotpants, and relaxed casual dresses. For footwear they had kitten heels or trainers. Some items were inspired by sports jerseys, with patterns of jersey numbers as a visual motif. Other aesthetic flourishes here included cut-outs, flounces, floral patterns, and racing stripes.

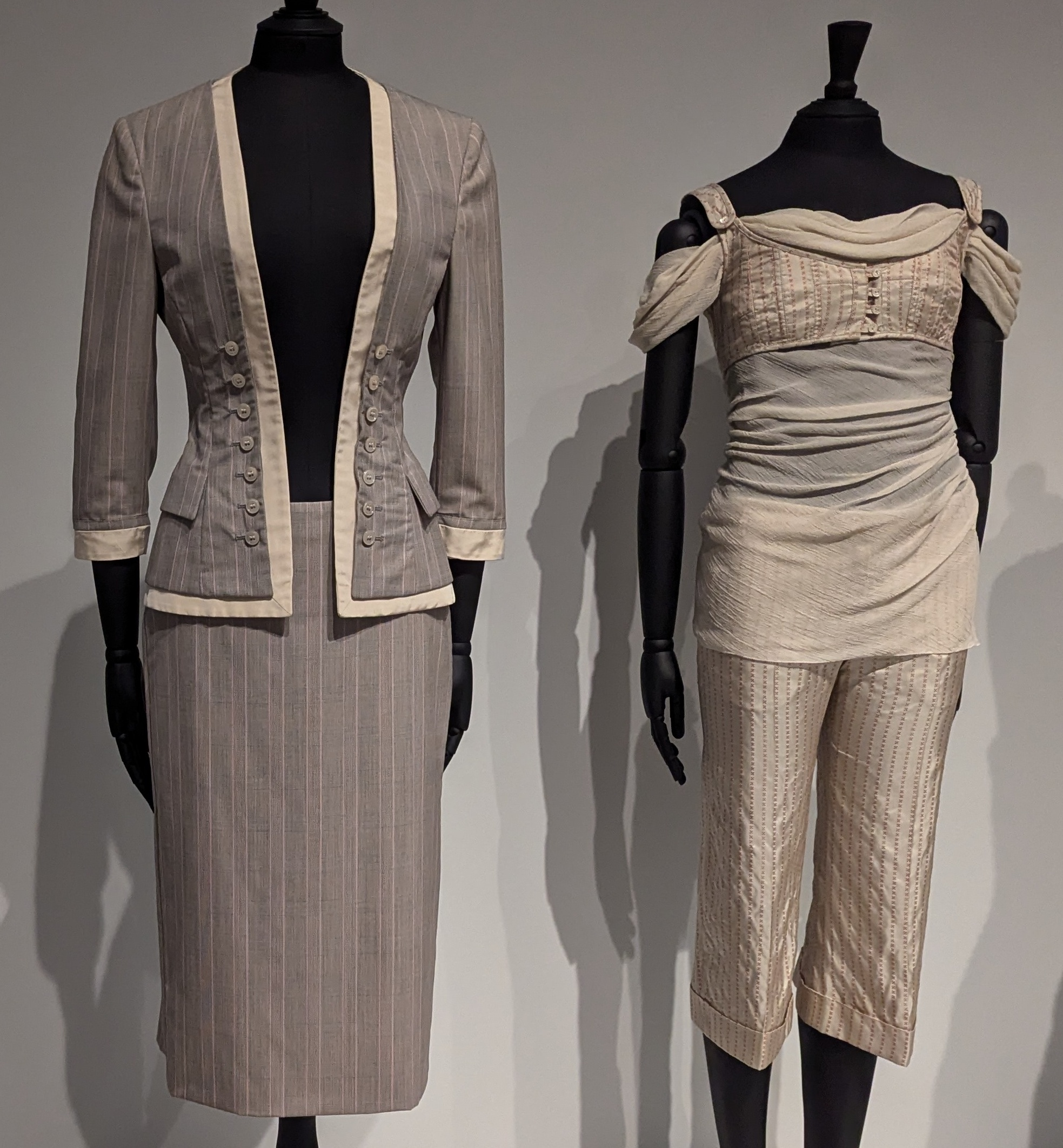
Two looks developed for Deliverance at Lee Alexander McQueen & Ann Ray - Rendez-Vous (2024); the look on the right was cut from the runway show

The daywear in the final phase was intended to suggest exhaustion and hopelessness through a transition to distressed garments in patchworks of faded colours and patterns. Utilitarian fabrics like denim, jersey, and cotton madras recalled the 1930s workwear that was adopted into the clothing style referred to as Americana. Unusually, these fabrics were used for tightly tailored, sensual designs rather than plain workwear. Some items had inlays of flesh-toned see-through fabric that made the designs look as though they were falling apart. Plain day dresses were given rounded Claudine collars. Floral patterns reappeared on dresses, muted to the point of resembling watercolours.

The menswear in the collection was taken from workwear and Americana. McQueen drew inspiration from the sailor characters in Querelle, a 1982 erotic art film, and the pimps and criminals described in the 1948 novel Our Lady of the Flowers. The men in the first phase wore muscle shirts and baggy pleated trousers, while in the second, they wore tank tops, shorts, and trainers, in accordance with its more athletic theme.

As was common for McQueen, several items were revisions of concepts from recent seasons. From The Dance of the Twisted Bull (Spring/Summer 2002), he returned to lace-up hipster pants and a ruffled, bias-cut dress made of diamond-shaped pieces of fabric sewn together. A chiffon top in the style of Marie Antoinette returned from Supercalifragilistic-expialidocious (Autumn/Winter 2002), and moss-green breeches and a black chiffon all-in-one were taken from Scanners (Autumn/Winter 2003).

== Runway show ==
=== Production details ===
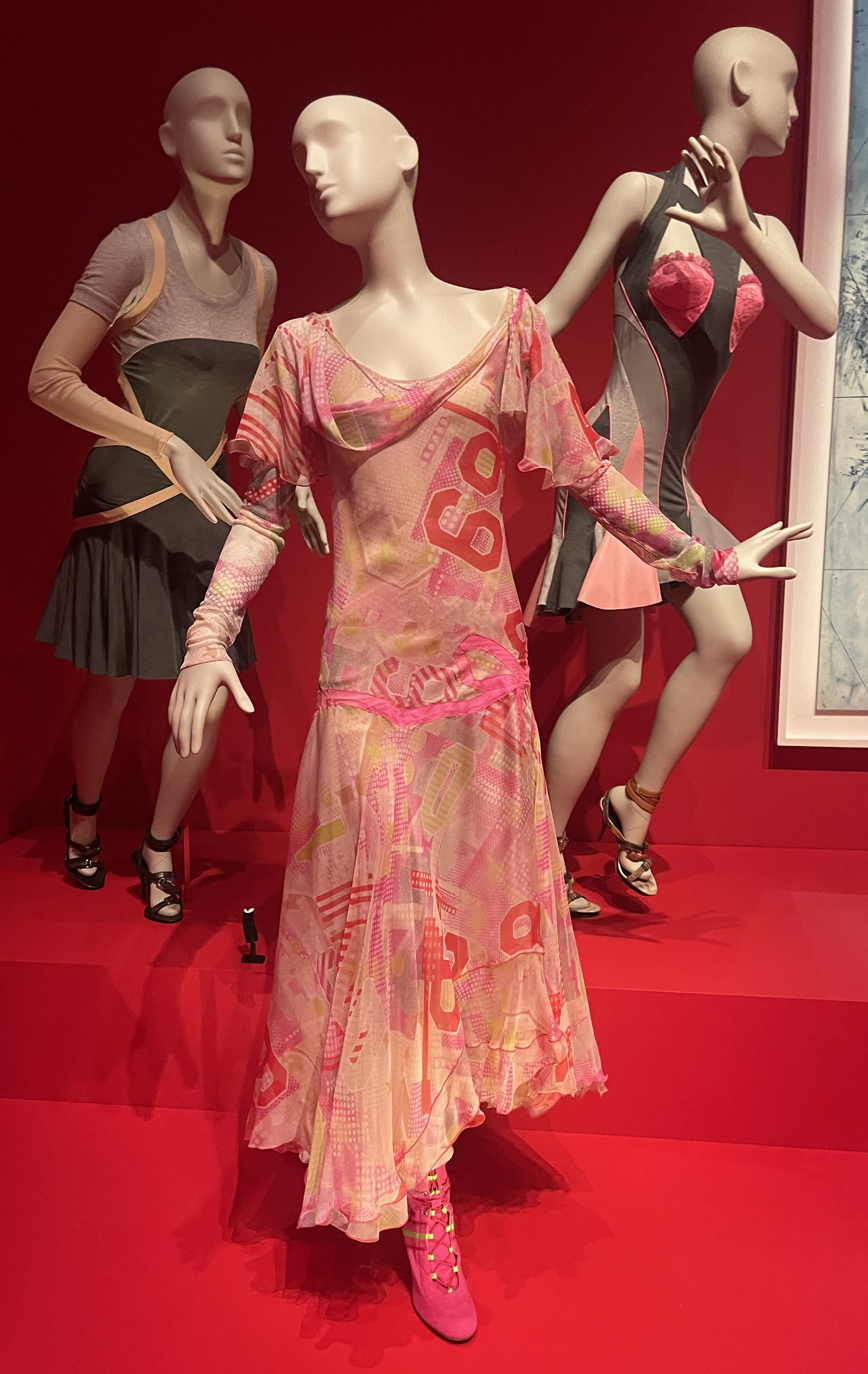
Ensembles from sportswear phase of Deliverance at Mind, Mythos, Muse

The runway show for Deliverance was staged on 10 October 2003 at the Salle Wagram auditorium in Paris, which had hosted boxing and dance events in the 19th century. The venue had red velvet curtains, crystal chandeliers, wood panelling, and Greek-style frescoes on the walls; McQueen added a disco ball for the show. The invitation was a cardboard medication packet. Gainsbury & Whiting oversaw production while Katy England managed styling. Joseph Bennett returned to handle set design. The Guido Palau styled hair, while Val Garland was responsible for make-up. Philip Treacy, McQueen's usual milliner, provided hats.

The show was conceived as a faux dance marathon in three phases, choreographed by ballet dancer Michael Clark with assistance from Les Child. McQueen told Paris Mode that he had always wanted to incorporate dance into his productions, and had been inspired by watching a film of Clark's choreography that reminded him of the emotional content in his own shows. The incorporation of choreography was a departure from fashion show norms, and required the casting of professional dancers to be paired with the models, most of whom had minimal dance experience.

Clark and Child cast twenty male dancers, most trained in contemporary dance with a few ballet dancers; they were paired in the show with twenty female models. Casting director Jess Hallett described McQueen as wanting a very specific look for the models, even selecting one woman himself off the street because she had what he thought was "a very 1930s face". McQueen also cast Karen Elson, with whom he had worked before, when developing the concept for the show. The training and rehearsal process for the show was two weeks long; Child recalled it as gruelling, especially for the models, most of whom lacked experience with dance. Elson sat out the rest of the season's shows in order to complete the training; Child recalled her as being "very keen" and described her performance as "brilliant".

For the show, make-up was kept fairly minimal. Models were sprayed with water rather than powdered, and additional cream was added for later phases to make them appear to be shining with sweat. Eye make-up was a variety of bright pastel tones. Men were styled with Brilliantined hair, as was common in the 1930s.

The soundtrack comprised a mix of big band and disco songs. Portions were borrowed from the soundtracks of The Cotton Club (1984) and The Color Purple (1985). The music was overlaid with occasional sirens and excerpts of the emcee's dialogue from They Shoot Horses, Don't They?, such as his exhortation to participants that "they must keep moving, they must keep dancing at all times".

=== Catwalk presentation ===
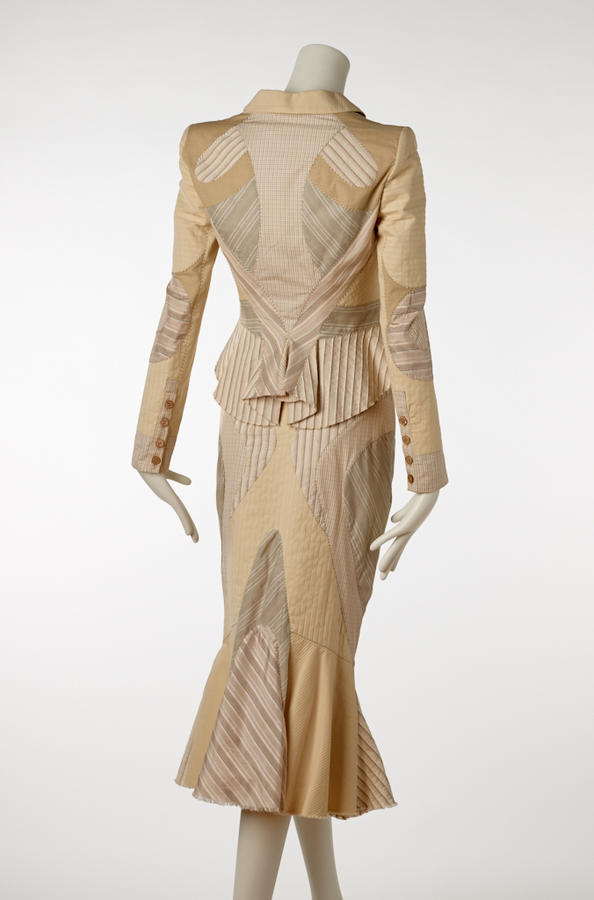
Back view of woman's skirt suit in cotton patchwork, at Rhode Island School of Design Museum of Art

At least eighty looks were presented in the runway show, counting womenswear and menswear. It was unusually long, with a running time of over twenty minutes. The first phase showcased at least twenty-one pairs of looks. In a subversion of the usual order for fashion shows, there was a focus on eveningwear, which is usually presented last. The show commenced with several couples performing traditional ballroom dancing styles like foxtrot, rhumba, and tango. Expressive movements demonstrated the hopeful, energetic attitude of the early stages of a dance marathon, although each couple danced a different style and tempo, creating an underlying discordant effect. As the show proceeded, couples walked offstage at intervals and were replaced with others in new ensembles. Karen Elson appeared in a silver sequined dress. The music used in this phase included the 1941 Duke Ellington version of the jazz standard "Take the "A" Train" and "Dance, Dance, Dance" (1977) by Chic. This portion concluded with the final couple walking offstage hand in hand.

The stage lights went down for the transition to phase two. Overhead lighting created the shape of an oval running track on the wooden floor. Six couples lined up at the starting line. At the sound of a starting gun, they raced around the track arm in arm, referencing an elimination derby seen in the film. The soundtrack here included a remixed version of "Smells Like Teen Spirit" (1991) by Nirvana. At the end of several laps, the couples crowded together, then began to collapse to the floor and the lights went down again.

The final phase represented the end of the dance marathon, with performers appearing exhausted, covered in sweat and their hair in disarray. The soundtrack here featured a distorted remix of "God Bless the Child" (1939) by Billie Holiday, followed by "Strangers" (1994) by Portishead. Karen Elson opened this phase in a floral dress, falling to the ground from the backstage curtains. She was pursued by her partner, who supported her as she lurched around deliriously before dragging her offstage. Other pairs followed in the same mode: the women struggling to keep dancing, slumping into their partners' arms, and being dragged offstage one by one. Toward the end of this phase, Elson walked onto the stage alone, wearing a distressed version of the silver sequinned column dress from the opening. She collapsed to the floor where she remained, writhing, as the other dancers staggered offstage. With a final jerk, she stopped moving and the lights went out.

After a pause, the lights came back up, including the running track; Elson remained on the floor in its centre. Holding hands, the models circled the track for their final walk. McQueen and Clark came out to take their bows, then carried Elson offstage.

== Reception ==
In the Stanley Kubrick movie "The Shining", [...] the young writer Jack Torrance [...] realises that he is trapped in a fantastical temporal loop and will never leave the Overlook [hotel]. I like to imagine something analogous, if less sinister, about the Deliverance show: I imagine the dancers and models will forever be performing in that theatre, on that night, somehow. It was unforgettable... because it was timeless McQueen.

— Robert Fairer, recalling his experience of Deliverance in 2016

Contemporary reception to Deliverance was generally positive. McQueen received a standing ovation at the runway show, a rarity in fashion. Andrew Wilson described the audience's reaction as "rapturous". Time called it "the best show of the season" and put it at number 8 on their top 10 fashion moments of 2003. Karen Elson recalled it as an unusually feminine show for McQueen.

The showmanship was a highlight for critics. Writing in Vogue, Sarah Mower thought McQueen had returned "the lifeblood" to fashion shows. She called the designs "exquisitely glamorous". In The Daily Telegraph, Hilary Alexander wrote that McQueen had "cemented his reputation as the king of spectacle" with the show, calling his designs "ingenious". Daphne Merkin at Elle felt that Deliverance was part of a trend for designers to "return to the exuberant idea of fashion as costume". She wrote that it was "characterized by equal parts nostalgia and ironic commentary on the uses of nostalgia".

The collection is well-remembered in retrospect. Dana Thomas, in her 2015 biography of McQueen Gods and Kings, wrote that the show "still stands today as his masterpiece". Chloe Fox called it a "brilliant subversion of and tribute to red carpet glamour". Judith Watt thought the "vampish glamour" of the first phase reminded her of John Galliano, another British designer with a theatrical style similar to McQueen. For Hal Rubenstein "what made the performance so memorable was McQueen’s unexpected, wickedly infectious, almost gleeful take on the frenzy." Robert Fairer, who photographed the show, recalled it as "fifteen glorious minutes" in which the audience was fully immersed in the show, to the point of trying to encourage the exhausted models to "recover and continue the dance", despite knowing it was a performance. Knox felt that McQueen had "unearthed the beauty buried at the heart of human adversity". When Vogue asked various designers about their favourite shows by others, in 2024, Francesco Risso named Deliverance, saying "It did get into my blood and it will stay with me forever."

Not all reception was positive: Iain Webb wrote that the show "provoked censorious reviews, questioning the designer's motives". Colin McDowell was critical of the use of the Great Depression theme "as a vehicle for selling extremely expensive clothes", sardonically suggesting that the next step for fashion would be using the Holocaust "as a marvellous opportunity to sell stripes". (Note: Inmates at Nazi concentration camps during the Holocaust were generally made to wear blue-and-white striped prison uniforms.) Claire Wilcox noted the irony of the collection being a commercial success, given the implications of it being a critique of the industry.

== Analysis ==
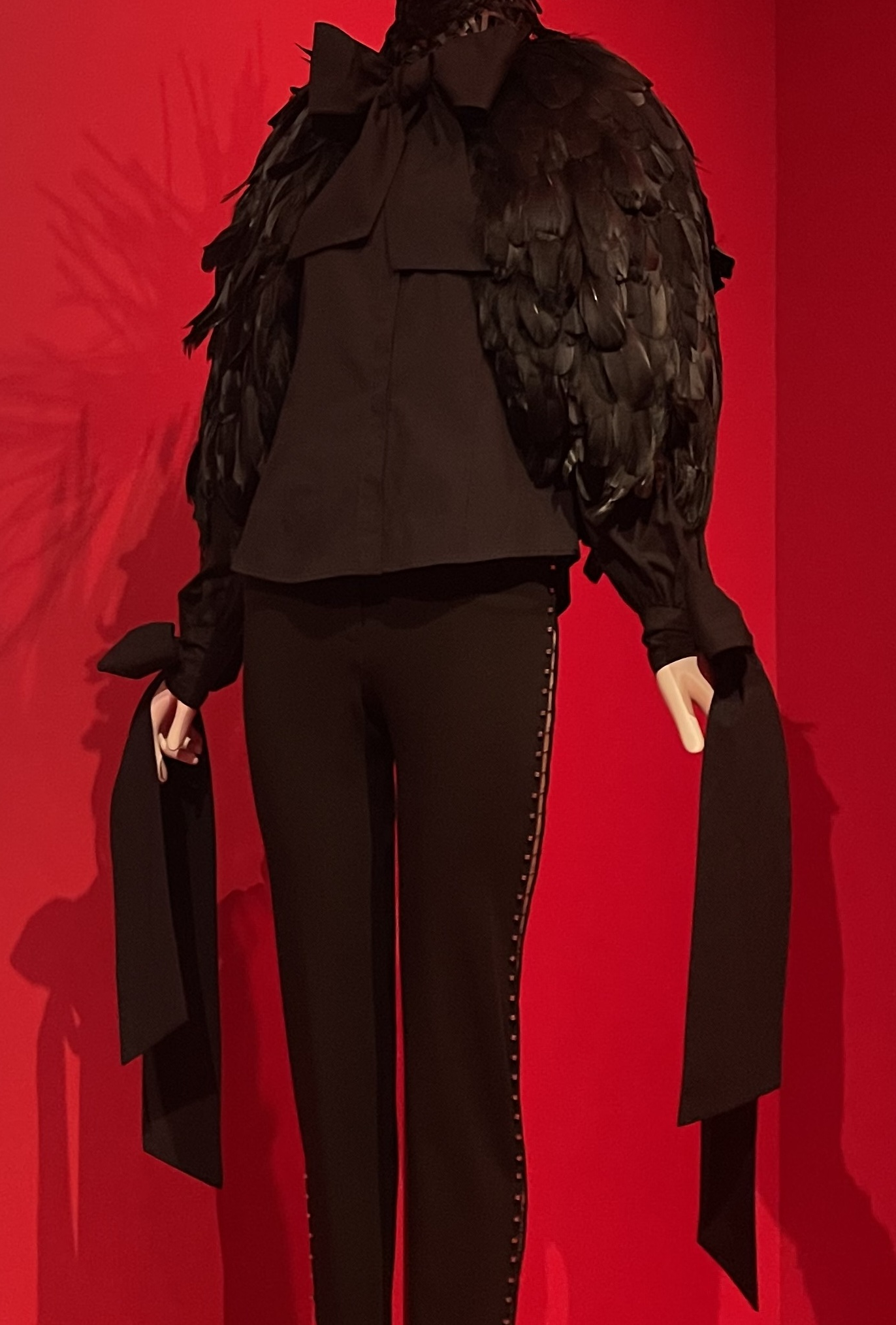
Feathered capelet from Deliverance at Mind, Mythos, Muse

McQueen described how he had expressed his thoughts about fashion and celebrity with Elson's pair of silver sequined dresses. He felt the first version exemplified a kind of "untouchable Hollywood glamour" that he found "alienating", whereas he found the second dress "beautiful in a different and more authentic way" because the damage made it more relatable and approachable for most people. Chloe Fox felt that in saying this, McQueen was "deliberately choosing to ignore the irony" of his own success: his skull scarf had become a trendy best-seller, and celebrities were regularly photographed wearing his designs. She quotes McQueen as being dismissive of the collection's inspiration: "Someone else's idea. [They Shoot Horses director] Sydney Pollack done that; I didn't do that. I just filled it up with clothes." Fox thought McQueen's "stubborn otherness" was a rejection of "the fruits of his own labour" that contributed to his later negativity about the industry.

Several commentators identified an underlying theme of the macabre in Deliverance. Hal Rubenstein cited it as an example of how McQueen found beauty in unlikely and macabre places. Henrique Grimaldi Figueredo felt the collection showed how McQueen connected "beauty rituals and death". For him, the notion that the performance was a dance to exhaustion and collapse indicated themes of sadism and fetishisation of death, but also "Dionysian ecstasy in the face of an imminent disappearance". He compared the collection to a "danse macabre", an allegorical motif of skeletons dancing, reminding the viewer that death comes to all equally in the end. Textile curators Clarissa M. Esguerra and Michaela Hansen analysed several elements as memento mori. A capelet made from black feathers may have been a reference to ravens as a symbol of death, which they thought added an "ominous element" to the otherwise glamorous first phase. Some sandal straps were made to look like they were made from wristwatches; the use of timepieces "acknowledged the passage of time" toward death. Finally, they referred to Elson's collapse as a "danse macabre" providing a "provocative critique of the fashion industry".

McQueen worked with photographer Nick Knight to create an editorial photoshoot using looks from the collection called "Blade of Light" for Numéro. It reminded fashion theorist Alastair O'Neill of work by eighteenth-century Japanese artist Hokusai. O'Neill felt the editorial echoed the "circularity of the race", the film, and the fashion show, representing fashion as equally "decorative as it is destructive."

Esguerra and Hansen identified the patchwork construction of the day suits and chiffon dresses as examples of McQueen's significant technical skills. They felt that McQueen had tailored these items to the body "with both technical and visual finesse".

== Legacy ==
Several looks from Deliverance have appeared in editorial photoshoots. For Vogue, Tesh photographed the silver sequined dress, while Corinne Day photographed one of the floral bias-cut designs. Paolo Roversi photographed Look 8, a black minidress with lace back, and Look 48, the beaded finale dress, for the December 2005 issue, in a shoot McQueen styled himself. Sadie Sink wore a floor-length patchwork gown from Look 15 for the 2026 D23 Fan Expo.

Photographer Nick Knight interviewed Karen Elson, who wore the silver sequined gown, in 2015. She described her experience as a "profoundly beautiful" one, recalling that she had become completely immersed in her character as an "exhausted and delirious" dancer. Her breasts fell out of her dress on the runway during her first dance in the final phase, which she said was not intentional, but felt it was part of the power of the moment. It was, she said, her "favourite ever fashion show experience". It was the second professional show Lily Cole walked in, and her first with McQueen; she recalled working with him as an unusual opportunity for performance rather than simply wearing clothes.

Although the Alexander McQueen: Savage Beauty exhibition was intended to cover McQueen's entire career, no items from the collection appeared in the original staging. The exhibition Lee Alexander McQueen: Mind, Mythos, Muse, originally staged in 2022, featured several items from Deliverance owned by the Los Angeles County Museum of Art: a floral dress with ruffled skirt, a patchwork day suit, a black feathered capelet, a pair of black pants, three dresses from the sportswear phase, and four pairs of footwear. The Fashion Institute of Design & Merchandising Museum in Los Angeles owns a copy of Look 58, a day suit.

== Bibliography ==
- Alexander McQueen | Women's Spring/Summer 2004 | Runway Show. Alexander McQueen. 18 March 2012 – via YouTube.
- Bolton, Andrew (2011). Alexander McQueen: Savage Beauty. New York City: Metropolitan Museum of Art. ISBN 978-1-58839-412-5. OCLC 687693871.
  - Frankel, Susannah. Introduction. In Bolton (2011), pp. 17–27.
- Esguerra, Clarissa M.; Hansen, Michaela (2022). Lee Alexander McQueen: Mind, Mythos, Muse. New York City: Delmonico Books. ISBN 978-1-63681-018-8. OCLC 1289986708.
- Fairer, Robert; Wilcox, Claire (2016). Alexander McQueen: Unseen. New Haven, Connecticut: Yale University Press. ISBN 978-0-300-22267-8. OCLC 946216643.
- Fox, Chloe (2012). Vogue On: Alexander McQueen. Vogue on Designers. London: Quadrille Publishing. ISBN 978-1849491136. OCLC 828766756.
- Geczy, Adam; Karaminas, Vicki (2019). Fashion Installation: Body, Space, and Performance. London: Bloomsbury Visual Arts. ISBN 978-1-350-03253-8.
- Gleason, Katherine (2012). Alexander McQueen: Evolution. New York City: Race Point Publishing. ISBN 978-1-61058-837-9. OCLC 783147416.
- Grimaldi Figueredo, Henrique (20 November 2020). "Performing the Risk: Four Contemporary Obituaries in Alexander McQueen". Conceição/Conception. 9: 1–18. doi:10.20396/conce.v9i00.8659720. ISSN 2317-5737.
- Knight, Nick (11 February 2015). "Interview: Karen Elson on Alexander McQueen". SHOWstudio.
- Knox, Kristin (2010). Alexander McQueen: Genius of a Generation. London: A&C Black. ISBN 978-1-4081-3223-4. OCLC 794296806.
- Merkin, Daphne (March 2004). "Divine inspiration". Elle. pp. 116–122.
- Mora, Juliana Luna; Berry, Jess (2 September 2022). "Creative Direction Succession in Luxury Fashion: The Illusion of Immortality at Chanel and Alexander McQueen". Luxury. 9 (2–3): 117–140. doi:10.1080/20511817.2022.2194039. ISSN 2051-1817.
- Nunn, Joan (2000). Fashion in Costume 1200-2000 (Revised ed.). London: The Herbert Press. ISBN 978-1-4616-6329-4.
- Rubenstein, Hal (2015). The Looks of Love: 50 Moments in Fashion That Inspired Romance. New York City: Harper Design. ISBN 978-0-06-227969-9.
- Snodgrass, Mary Ellen (2014). Encyclopedia of Gothic Literature. New York City: Infobase Publishing. ISBN 978-1-4381-0911-4. Archived from the original on 14 January 2023.
- Thomas, Dana (2015). Gods and Kings: The Rise and Fall of Alexander McQueen and John Galliano. New York City: Penguin Publishing. ISBN 978-1-101-61795-3. OCLC 951153602.
- Watt, Judith (2012). Alexander McQueen: The Life and the Legacy. New York City: Harper Design. ISBN 978-1-84796-085-6. OCLC 892706946.
- Webb, Iain R. (2022). The Fashion Show: The Stories, Invites and Art of 300 Landmark Shows (2nd ed.). London: Welbeck. ISBN 978-1-80279-432-8.
- Wilcox, Claire, ed. (2015). Alexander McQueen. New York City: Abrams Books. ISBN 978-1-4197-1723-9. OCLC 891618596.
  - Bethune, Kate. "Encyclopedia of Collections". In Wilcox (2015), pp. 303–326.
  - Evans, Caroline. "Modelling McQueen: Hard Grace". In Wilcox (2015), pp. 189–201.
  - Fury, Alex. "Show, and Tell". In Wilcox (2015), pp. 220–233.
  - O'Neill, Alistair. "The Shining and Chic". In Wilcox (2015), pp. 261–280.
  - Pritchard, Jane. "Dance". In Wilcox (2015), pp. 252–257.
- Wilson, Andrew (2015). Alexander McQueen: Blood Beneath the Skin. New York City: Simon and Schuster. ISBN 978-1-4767-7674-3. OCLC 1310585849.
