= Supercalifragilisticexpialidocious (collection) =

2002 fashion collection by Alexander McQueen

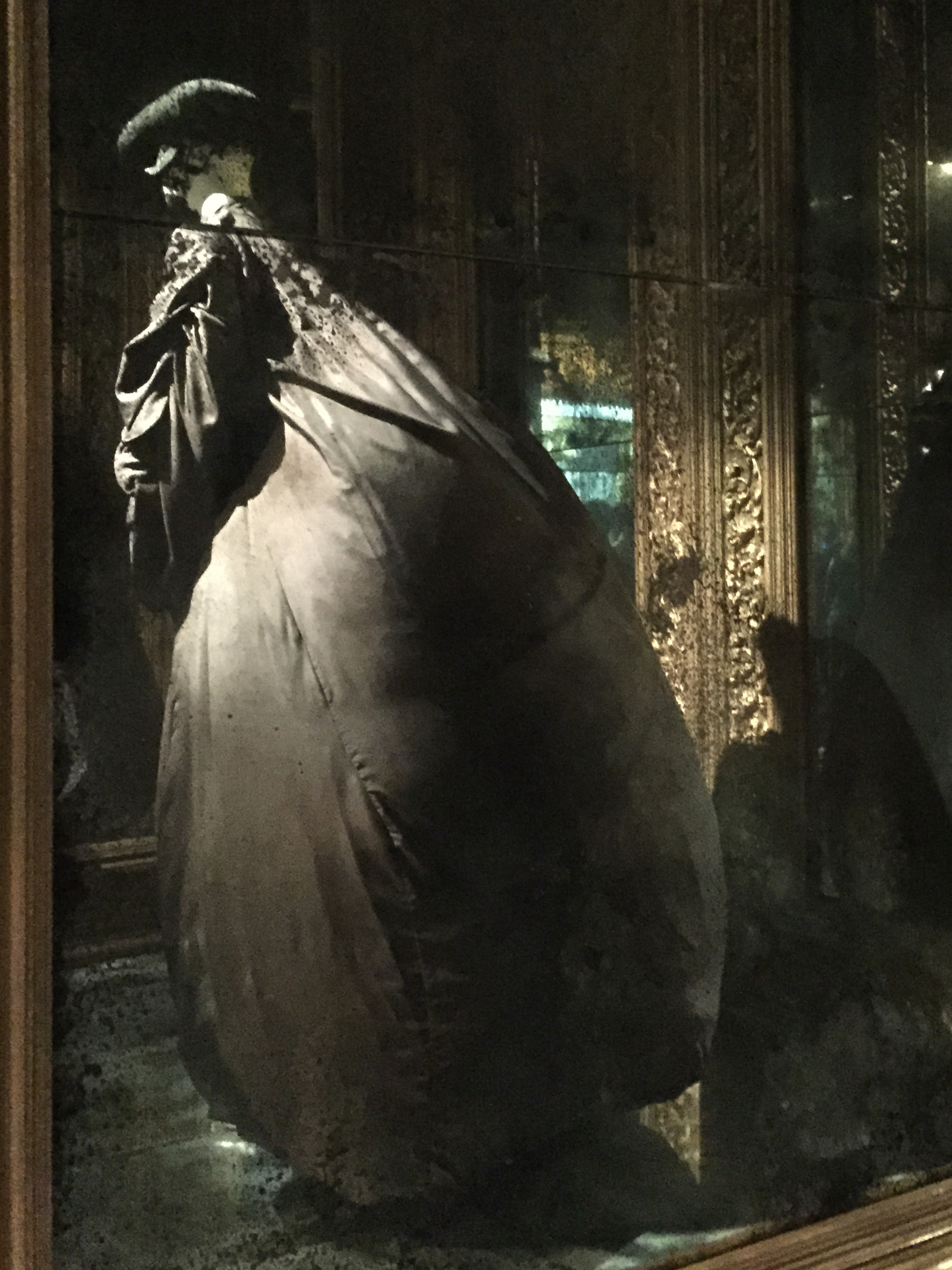
Parachute cape in black silk from Supercalifragilisticexpialidocious, shown at Alexander McQueen: Savage Beauty (2015)

Supercalifragilisticexpialidocious, sometimes shortened to Supercalifragilistic, is the twentieth collection by British designer Alexander McQueen, released for the Autumn/Winter 2002 season of his eponymous fashion house. Its title comes from the Mary Poppins song "Supercalifragilisticexpialidocious" (1964). Supercalifragilistic was primarily inspired by the Gothic aesthetic of American director Tim Burton, as well as fairy tales, English school uniforms, and the history of the French Revolution. The collection was heavily sexualised with concepts from fetish fashion such as leather harnesses and sexualised school uniforms. Historicist elements were drawn from the French queen Marie Antoinette, known for her interest in fashion.

The collection's runway show was staged on 9 March 2002 at La Conciergerie, a former prison in Paris where Marie Antoinette had been imprisoned before her execution. Compared to the fairly low-key previous season, Supercalifragilistic marked a return to the macabre theatre McQueen was known for. Tim Burton styled the invitation and the dim, moody lighting. Fifty-seven looks were presented, beginning with a model leading a pair of wolf-dogs down the runway.

Response to the collection was positive, and it is well-remembered in retrospect. Sales were strong, and several designs from the show were seen on the red carpet, particularly a plum-coloured peasant dress. Gwyneth Paltrow was criticised for wearing an ensemble from the collection, a braless see-through top with black skirt, to the 74th Academy Awards. Critical analysis has focused on the collection's Gothic aesthetic and sexuality. Various museums hold items from the collection, some of which have appeared in exhibitions like the retrospective Alexander McQueen: Savage Beauty.

== Background ==
British designer Alexander McQueen was known in the fashion industry for his imaginative, sometimes controversial designs, and fashion shows which were theatrical to the point of verging on performance art. Over the course of his career, which lasted from 1992 until his death in 2010, he explored a broad range of ideas and themes, particularly sexuality, death, violence, romanticism, and historicism. From October 1996 to October 2001, McQueen was – in addition to his responsibilities for his own label – head designer at French fashion house Givenchy. In 2000, McQueen sold 51 per cent of his company to Italian fashion house Gucci but retained creative control. Although he worked in ready-to-wear – clothing produced for retail sale – his showpiece designs featured a degree of craftsmanship that verged on haute couture.

McQueen's personal fixations had a strong influence on his designs and shows, especially his love of film, which he drew on from the beginning of his career with his first commercial collection, Taxi Driver (Autumn/Winter 1993), named for the 1976 Martin Scorsese film. Other explicitly film-inspired collections include The Birds (Spring/Summer 1995), The Hunger (Spring/Summer 1996), Deliverance (Spring/Summer 2004), and The Man Who Knew Too Much (Autumn/Winter 2005).

== Concept and collection ==
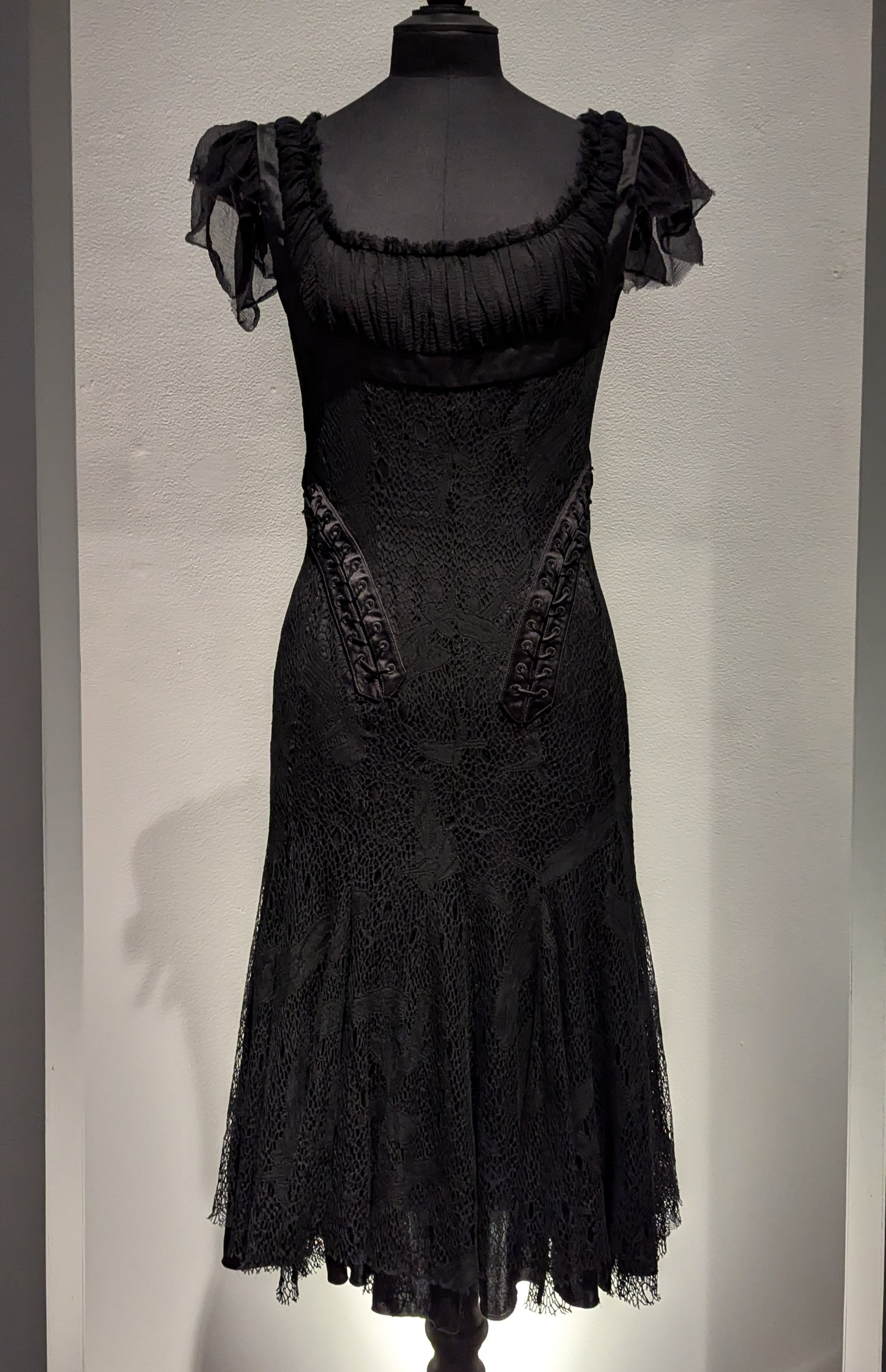
Little black dress from the collection at Lee Alexander McQueen & Ann Ray - Rendez-Vous (2024)

Supercalifragilisticexpialidocious, sometimes shortened to Supercalifragilistic, (Autumn/Winter 2002) is the twentieth collection McQueen designed for his eponymous fashion house. The show's title is taken from the song "Supercalifragilisticexpialidocious" from the 1964 film Mary Poppins. It was primarily inspired by the films of American director Tim Burton, especially the Gothic horror film Sleepy Hollow (1999); McQueen and Burton shared a darkly romantic aesthetic in their work. Burton contributed to the staging of the runway show at McQueen's invitation. Other motifs include fairy tales, subversion of English school uniforms, and the history of the French Revolution. McQueen's signature tailoring featured heavily. He told Numéro magazine that the collection had "started off dark and then got more romantic as it went along".

Designs in Supercalifragilistic drew especially on Grimms' Fairy Tales, using motifs associated with stock fairy tale characters such as princesses or milkmaids. Capes suggested roguish archetypes such as highwaymen or the Three Musketeers. One dramatic highwayman-esque outfit with a parachute cape, tricorn hat, and domino mask was inspired by Sleepy Hollow. The opening look was a hooded cape in mauve, drawing on imagery of Little Red Riding Hood, albeit in a different colour. The capes and masks have also been interpreted as inspired by socialite and arts patron Luisa Casati, or a reference to Burton's Batman (1989).

Another series of outfits played on the sexualisation of school uniforms by pairing traditional elements like striped ties, blazers, pleated skirts, and knee shorts with eroticised items like low-cut bumster trousers or thigh-high boots. Each outfit was individualised, subverting the unvarying aspect of a uniform and evoking imagery of adolescent sexuality and rebellion. Some items were made to look silvery or metallic. These looks may have been referencing the British film series St. Trinian's (1954), which concerns a school for unruly girls. Sarah Mower of Vogue also suspected an influence from the bad schoolgirls depicted in the photography of Helmut Lang. Some models in the runway show were styled with bowler hats, referencing the rebellious youth from the film A Clockwork Orange (1971).

McQueen's work was often historicist, referring back to styles and silhouettes from the past, although modernised in cutting and material. In Supercalifragilistic, his focus was the French queen Marie Antoinette, known for her interest in fashion. Claire Wilcox considered this a return to the "bleak decadence" he had explored the previous year with What a Merry-Go-Round (Autumn/Winter 2001), which had also drawn from the French Revolution. He incorporated eighteenth century silhouettes like high-waisted or "empire" dresses and voluminous ball gowns, and aesthetic elements like ruff collars and ruffles. See-through chemise tops referenced a famous painting, Marie Antoinette with a Rose, the original version of which scandalously depicted the queen in a translucent chemise. (Note: The original chemise version of the portrait has been lost. The artist, Élisabeth Vigée Le Brun, produced five subsequent versions with variations in costume, for example with a hat or in a muslin dress, which are still extant.) McQueen may also have been referencing the decadently-dressed incroyables and merveilleuses of the post-Revolutionary French First Republic.

Sexuality played a strong role throughout. There were satin knickers and camisoles indicating a sensual element. The darker side of sexuality was shown through the inclusion of sadomasochistic (S&M) elements from fetish fashion, especially leather. There were leather harnesses, corsets, and even face masks. Leather elements were added to some of the softly romantic dresses for contrast. Tall lace-up boots and seductively tight pencil skirts also played on the fetish for a strict, dominant woman, possibly a headmistress.

McQueen told Women's Wear Daily he had revisited previous ideas to refine and perfect them. His signature sharp tailoring appeared in a series of severe tweed suits. Author Judith Watt likened them to the Le Smoking tuxedo by Yves Saint Laurent, while Kate Bethune felt they referenced the restrained aesthetics of German Protestantism. The tailored items were contrasted with voluminous ones like full denim skirts. Denim also appeared in dresses, jumpsuits, and jeans, including side-laced jeans making a return from the previous season's collection The Dance of the Twisted Bull (Spring/Summer 2002).

Little black dresses reminded some reviewers of the Goth teenager Winona Ryder played in Burton's Beetlejuice (1988). For eveningwear, there were tight dresses adorned with large ruffles of fabric, a style that later became a brand signature. Other aesthetic elements included a profusion of black lace and fringe. Bethune thought a series of burgundy items were suggestive of bloodshed, possibly of the French Revolution.

== Runway show ==
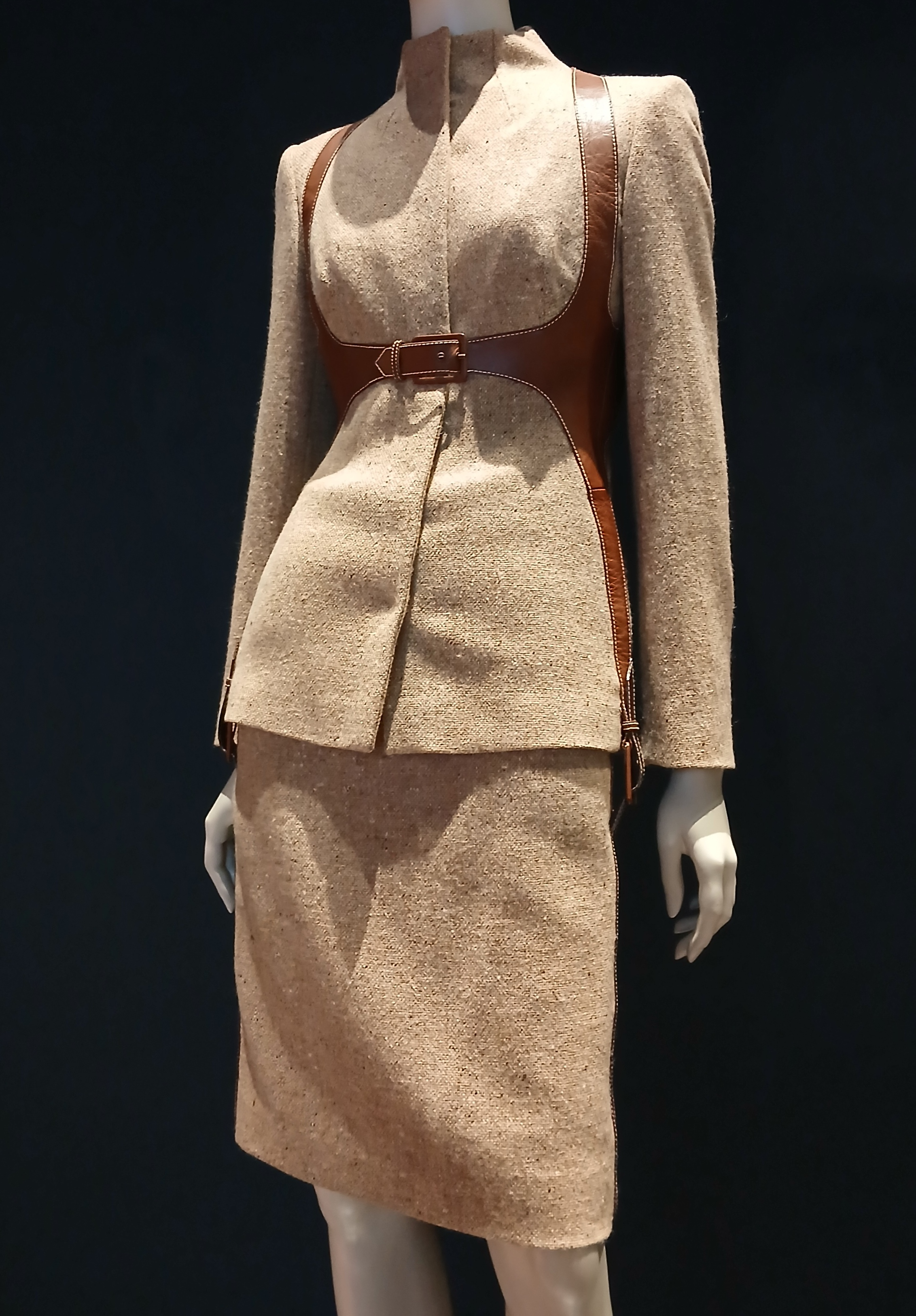
Skirt suit from Supercalifragilistic at the exhibit accompanying the House of McQueen play, 2025

The runway show for Supercalifragilistic was staged on 9 March 2002 at La Conciergerie, a former prison in Paris where Marie Antoinette had been imprisoned before her execution. The invitation, styled by Tim Burton, was made to look like a school notebook with inkblots and Burton's sketches of women. The soundtrack was taken from Burton's Sleepy Hollow. Compared to the fairly low-key presentation of Twisted Bull, Supercalifragilistic marked a return to the macabre theatre McQueen was known for.

Production was overseen by Gainsbury & Whiting, and Katy England was in charge of overall styling. Burton was also responsible for the show's lighting. Joseph Bennett returned to handle set design. Headpieces were made by miliner Philip Treacy. Val Garland styled make-up, while Guido Palau was responsible for hair.

Most models were styled with their hairlines covered by cloth, with a pair of thin fabric-wrapped pigtails left loose in front. The aesthetic suggested medieval hair coverings and the head-wraps from McQueen's Voss (Spring/Summer 2001). Make-up was generally kept light. Styling for the school uniform phase was more rebellious. Hair in this section of the show was styled to look disheveled. Make-up in this section, and for some later looks, was elaborately stagey, drawing on 1970s rock bands like Kiss or the New York Dolls.

The venue had high, vaulted ceilings, and wolf-dogs were seen walking around in the backlit barred windows of the upper story gallery. (Note: Numerous sources refer to the animals as wolves, but they were husky-wolf hybrids and not full-blooded wolves.) The lighting was kept dim and moody, the catwalk lit mainly by blue-tinted spotlights. The style resembled what author Catherine Spooner called the "urban chiaroscuro" of Burton's Batman (1989).

Fifty-seven looks were presented. The show opened with a model in mauve hood and cape leading two more wolf-dogs on leashes. This was followed by a set of looks in tailored tweed with leather harness elements. Next came a series of outfits in burgundy leather and ruched chiffon, transitioning to a set of subverted school uniforms. These were followed by evening looks in black lace and fringe, some with leather elements. Kamila Szczawińska appeared in this phase in the highwayman outfit with mask, tricorn hat, and billowing cape, followed by Maja Latinović, swathed in fur. The final dress drew on Marie Antoinette's aesthetic, with a corset and panels of bias-cut fabric. McQueen came out for his bow in a tailored Savile Row suit.

== Reception ==
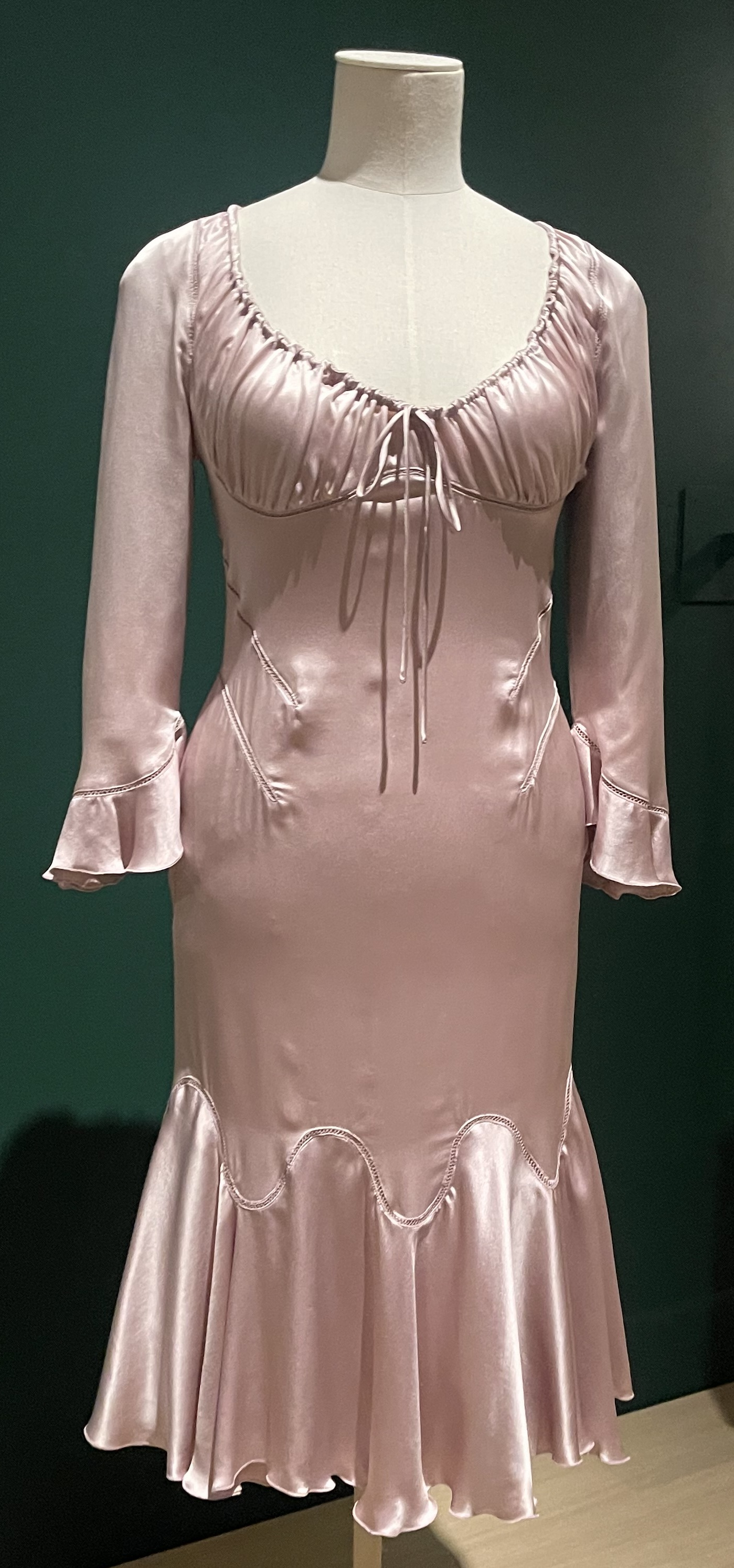
Pink empire-waist dress from the collection, presented at Lee Alexander McQueen: Mind, Mythos, Muse (2023)

Supercalifragilistic was well received by most contemporary critics. Harriet Quick of British Vogue said that "The consensus after the show was that it was the first time anyone had actually wanted to wear McQueen rather than just enjoy the spectacle." Jan Lindstrom of Variety identified it as part of a trend for "dark glamour" for fall that year. One significant exception was Anthony Loyd, who reviewed the show for The Times in lieu of Suzy Menkes, their usual fashion correspondent. Loyd felt the imagery was "misogynistic" and called it a "corrupt and twisted" expression of sexuality.

Susannah Frankel of The Independent thought the collection successfully played on the "juxtaposition between the prettily romantic and the menacing that McQueen has made his own". She called it his "strongest collection for some time" and highlighted the S&M elements, schoolgirl uniforms, and "street-inspired" denim as the best elements. Nick Compton, who interviewed McQueen for i-D magazine in September 2002, called the collection "immaculately done, clear and consistent and sellable".

The collection was commercially successful; by the time of its release, McQueen's brand had been expanded from selling 120 different items to 600. Domenico de Sole, McQueen's boss at the Gucci group, told British Vogue that while McQueen's sales for the previous collection had been extremely good, buyers were in "paroxysms of ordering" for this collection. He was particularly pleased with the sales of "the Marie Antoinette frocks, the suits with leather detailing and the corseted jackets". A plum-coloured peasant dress, Look 20 from the runway, was one of the season's most popular designs. McQueen told Compton that he felt his turn to the commercial was a sign of his growing maturity and business acumen.

The collection is well-remembered in retrospect. Andrew Wilson wrote that McQueen's "dark romantic spirit found full expression" in the designs. Chloe Fox called it a "powerful collection for powerful women". Judith Watt wrote that it accommodated both sides of McQueen's market – the commercial side and the more extreme "statement" side.

== Analysis ==
=== Gothic aesthetic ===
In an analysis of McQueen's Gothic leanings, Catherine Spooner described Supercalifragilistic as one of McQueen's "most overtly Gothic collections". McQueen's tendency to depict the body in the Gothic mode as "surface that can be made and remade" had appeared throughout his work – the invite of Highland Rape (Autumn/Winter 1995) showed a sutured wound, and his Givenchy collection Eclect Dissect (Autumn/Winter 1997) was themed around a mad scientist surgically reassembling women. In Supercalifragilistic, this tendency resurfaced in Burton's contributions to the show. His films often depict women's bodies or clothing "visibly stitched together", and his invitation to the show similarly depicted women as patchworks, melding woman and dress.

Spooner also wrote that the notion of the body as changeable is a common fairy tale motif, which McQueen had incorporated in a "Gothicized" manner here and elsewhere in his work. As an example, she cited an AnOther magazine editorial directed by McQueen and photographed by Sam Taylor-Johnson. McQueen had described it as "very Grimm's fairytale", comparing the male model to the folk tale figure Dick Whittington and calling the female model "Puss Without Her Boots".

=== Other analyses ===
Several critics commented on the aesthetics of sexuality presented in the collection. Nick Compton from i-D felt the opening look, which referenced Red Riding Hood, was a nod to the story's sexual undertones: "the awakening adolescent, the wolves as sexual predators or the budding sexual impulse." Kate Bethune compared the collection to What a Merry-Go-Round, as both drew on children's literature and film while incorporating a dark sensuality. She wrote that Supercalifragilistic had, like its predecessor, "subverted adolescent norms with its sexual overtones and implied sadomasochism". Katherine Knox thought the restrictiveness of the S&M elements echoed the history of the venue as a prison. She felt the highwayman figure appearing at the end was a "heroic figure" representing female liberation with her loose billowing outfit and suggested this was evidence of McQueen's tendency "to present clear and easy-to-follow narratives" in his shows.

Susannah Frankel suggested that McQueen must have been aware of the significance of the message he was sending by selecting a venue tied to Marie Antoinette, whose downfall was at least partly blamed on the public perception of her as salacious and extravagant. She thought McQueen had emphasised the collection's sexuality to play on this. Spooner also noted that the Marie Antoinette portrait McQueen had referenced had also "informed the depiction of women's bodies in the early Gothic novel".

The advertising campaign for Supercalifragilistic depicted a model suspended in a water-filled vessel; Wilcox identified this as part of McQueen's tendency to play on the "deathly property of water", as he did in the intro film to Irere (Spring/Summer 2003) and editorial photoshoots for Plato's Atlantis (Spring/Summer 2010).

Caroline Evans described McQueen's shows as requiring a certain level of "physical endurance" from models and other staff, citing Supercalifragilistic as one example. According to model Laura Morgan, the hem of the mauve cape she wore to open the show was stained with the seamstress's blood; she had been rushing to complete it in the half hour before the show began.

Textile curators Clarissa M. Esguerra and Michaela Hansen cited the tweed and leather items, which combine elements from "outerwear, underwear, and accessories" in an atypical way, as examples of how McQueen broke sartorial norms "to expand on his deconstruction of clothing".

== Legacy ==
=== Celebrity wear ===
Penélope Cruz wore a black scoop-necked lace gown from the collection for the June 2002 premiere of Minority Report.

Actress Gwyneth Paltrow wore an ensemble adapted from Supercalifragilistic to the 74th Academy Awards in March 2002. The outfit consisted of a see-through black mesh top worn with no bra underneath and a full-length black silk skirt. Paltrow was widely criticised for the look, which was considered inappropriate for the formal occasion and not suited to her personal style. Despite the criticism, McQueen said he was satisfied with the look and had enjoyed the opportunity to dress Paltrow against type: "I like to take people's characters out of themselves." Paltrow described the outfit as a misstep in 2013. In retrospect, she thought adding a bra and opting for simpler hair and make-up might have made for a better look.

In addition to being a commercial success, the plum peasant dress was popular with celebrities; Julianne Moore and Christina Ricci were both seen wearing it. Whitney Houston wore it on the front cover of her 2002 album Just Whitney, and television presenter Ulrika Jonsson wore it to her 2002 book launch. The fashion editors at The Guardian deemed its popularity a sign that McQueen, whose designs were once considered outré for red carpet wear, was becoming acceptable in mainstream fashion. They regarded Jonsson's appearance in it as a "rare moment of class" for her. Similarly, Karen Kay of the Evening Standard wrote that it was "astounding" that McQueen had gone from being a controversial and edgy designer to a "safe option" for red carpet wear. McQueen was less pleased about his designs being associated with conventional celebrities, complaining to The Times that Jonsson had not received the dress from his brand.

McQueen's friend Daphne Guinness wore the black cape from Supercalifragilistic to his funeral in 2010.

=== Other ===
Greg Kadell photographed one of the little black dresses for Vogue. McQueen's mentor and muse Isabella Blow was photographed by Donald McPherson wearing the highwayman outfit.

The National Gallery of Victoria (NGV) in Australia owns two dresses from the collection, Looks 41 and 44. The Metropolitan Museum of Art (the Met) in New York City owns a copy of Look 52, a pink dress with leather harness.

The retrospective exhibition Alexander McQueen: Savage Beauty featured three ensembles from Supercalifragilistic: the black skirt and jacket from Look 39, the black mesh shirt and black silk skirt from Look 46, and the "highwayman" ensemble from Look 50. The 2022 exhibition Lee Alexander McQueen: Mind, Mythos, Muse featured several items from Supercalifragilistic: a tweed jacket with leather harness, a pair of side-laced jeans, a pink silk dress, and a pair of leather boots. One of Burton's invitations was shown in the 2024 retrospective The World of Tim Burton, at the Design Museum in London.

Sarah Burton, McQueen's successor as creative director of the label, returned to the harness concept for her Autumn/Winter 2011 show, her second after McQueen's death. It became a recurring motif for the brand, culminating in the "Curve" bag introduced for Spring/Summer 2021, the front of which featured crossed straps evoking the harnesses.

== Bibliography ==
- Bolton, Andrew (2011). Alexander McQueen: Savage Beauty. New York City: Metropolitan Museum of Art. ISBN 978-1-58839-412-5. OCLC 687693871.
- Deniau, Anne (2012). Love Looks Not with the Eyes: Thirteen Years with Lee Alexander McQueen. New York City: Abrams Books. ISBN 978-1-61312-415-4. OCLC 785067241.
- Esguerra, Clarissa M.; Hansen, Michaela (2022). Lee Alexander McQueen: Mind, Mythos, Muse. New York City: Delmonico Books. ISBN 1-63681-018-7. OCLC 1289986708.
- Fairer, Robert; Wilcox, Claire (2016). Alexander McQueen: Unseen. New Haven, Connecticut: Yale University Press. ISBN 0-300-22267-X. OCLC 946216643.
- Fox, Chloe (2012). Vogue On: Alexander McQueen. Vogue on Designers. London: Quadrille Publishing. ISBN 1849491135. OCLC 828766756.
- Gleason, Katherine (2012). Alexander McQueen: Evolution. New York City: Race Point Publishing. ISBN 978-1-61058-837-9. OCLC 783147416.
- Hill, Colleen (2016). Fairy Tale Fashion. New Haven: Yale University Press. ISBN 978-0-300-21802-2. OCLC 920017513.
- Knox, Kristin (2010). Alexander McQueen: Genius of a Generation. London: A&C Black. ISBN 978-1-4081-3223-4. OCLC 794296806.
- Lee, Michelle (2003). Fashion Victim: Our Love-hate Relationship with Dressing, Shopping, and the Cost of Style. New York City: Broadway Books. ISBN 978-0-7679-1048-4.
- Mora, Juliana Luna; Berry, Jess (2 September 2022). "Creative Direction Succession in Luxury Fashion: The Illusion of Immortality at Chanel and Alexander McQueen". Luxury. 9 (2–3): 117–140. doi:10.1080/20511817.2022.2194039. ISSN 2051-1817.
- Morrison, Sasha Charnin (2011). Secrets of Stylists: An Insider's Guide to Styling the Stars. San Francisco: Chronicle Books. ISBN 978-1-4521-0577-2.
- Thomas, Dana (2015). Gods and Kings: The Rise and Fall of Alexander McQueen and John Galliano. New York City: Penguin Publishing. ISBN 978-1-101-61795-3. OCLC 951153602.
- Watt, Judith (2012). Alexander McQueen: The Life and the Legacy. New York City: Harper Design. ISBN 978-1-84796-085-6. OCLC 892706946.
- Wilcox, Claire, ed. (2015). Alexander McQueen. New York City: Abrams Books. ISBN 978-1-4197-1723-9. OCLC 891618596.
  - Bethune, Kate. "Encyclopedia of Collections". In Wilcox (2015), pp. 303–326.
  - Evans, Caroline. "Modelling McQueen: Hard Grace". In Wilcox (2015), pp. 189–201.
  - Spooner, Catherine. "A Gothic Mind". In Wilcox (2015), pp. 141–158.
  - O'Neill, Alistair. "The Shining and Chic". In Wilcox (2015), pp. 261–280.
  - Wilcox, Claire. "Plato's Atlantis: Anatomy of a Collection". In Wilcox (2015), pp. 83–103.
- Wilson, Andrew (2015). Alexander McQueen: Blood Beneath the Skin. New York City: Simon and Schuster. ISBN 978-1-4767-7674-3. OCLC 1310585849.
