= The Dance of the Twisted Bull =

2002 fashion collection by Alexander McQueen

Look 33, the collection's central showpiece, a long red and white ruffled flamenco-style dress designed to look as though it – and the model – had been pierced by decorative bullfighting spears, worn here on the runway by Irish model Laura Morgan.

The Dance of the Twisted Bull (Spanish: El baile del toro retorcido) is the nineteenth collection by British designer Alexander McQueen, released for the Spring/Summer 2002 season of his eponymous fashion house. Twisted Bull was inspired by Spanish culture and art, especially the traditional clothing worn for flamenco dancing and bullfighting. In McQueen's typical fashion, the collection included sharp tailoring and historicist elements and emphasised femininity and sexuality.

The runway show for Twisted Bull was staged during Paris Fashion Week on 6 October 2001 at the headquarters of the Stade Français sports club. It was McQueen's first collection following his departure from Givenchy and the sale of his company to the Gucci Group in 2001. Compared to his previous seasons, which tended to be theatrical and artistic, the runway show was simple, and the clothing designs were unusually commercial. McQueen confirmed that this was a business decision intended to drive sales for his first season under Gucci. Sales for the collection were reportedly strong.

Reception for Twisted Bull was mostly positive, especially from British journalists, who highlighted the accessible designs and polished presentation. American journalists were less impressed, particularly with the dressmaking. The most noted look from the collection was a showpiece dress made to look as though its torso was pierced through by spears, which later appeared in both stagings of the retrospective exhibition Alexander McQueen: Savage Beauty. Other looks appeared in the 2022 retrospective exhibition Lee Alexander McQueen: Mind, Mythos, Muse.

== Background ==
British designer Alexander McQueen was known in the fashion industry for his imaginative, sometimes controversial designs. Over the course of his career, which lasted from 1992 until his death in 2010, he explored a broad range of ideas and themes, themes, particularly sexuality, death, violence, romanticism, and historicism. His collections were strongly historicist, referencing and reworking historical narratives and concepts. His fashion shows were theatrical to the point of verging on performance art. The runway shows for his last two collections before The Dance of the Twisted Bull had both been in this mode: Voss (Spring/Summer 2001) was staged as a voyeuristic look inside a stereotypical insane asylum, while the set dressing for What A Merry-Go-Round (Autumn/Winter 2001) included an actual carousel ride.

From 1996 to October 2001, McQueen was – in addition to his responsibilities for his own label – head designer at French fashion house Givenchy. His time at Givenchy was fraught, primarily because of creative differences between him and the label, and the press speculated that he would leave his contract early. In December 2000, before his contract with Givenchy had finished, McQueen signed a deal with Gucci, an Italian fashion house and rival to Givenchy, effectively daring Givenchy to fire him. (Note: They did not, but they did cancel his final catwalk show, replacing it with a pair of simple presentations to a very small number of invitees.) Gucci bought 51 per cent of McQueen's company with McQueen remaining its creative director. Twisted Bull was McQueen's first collection for his own label under Gucci.

== Concept and creative process ==
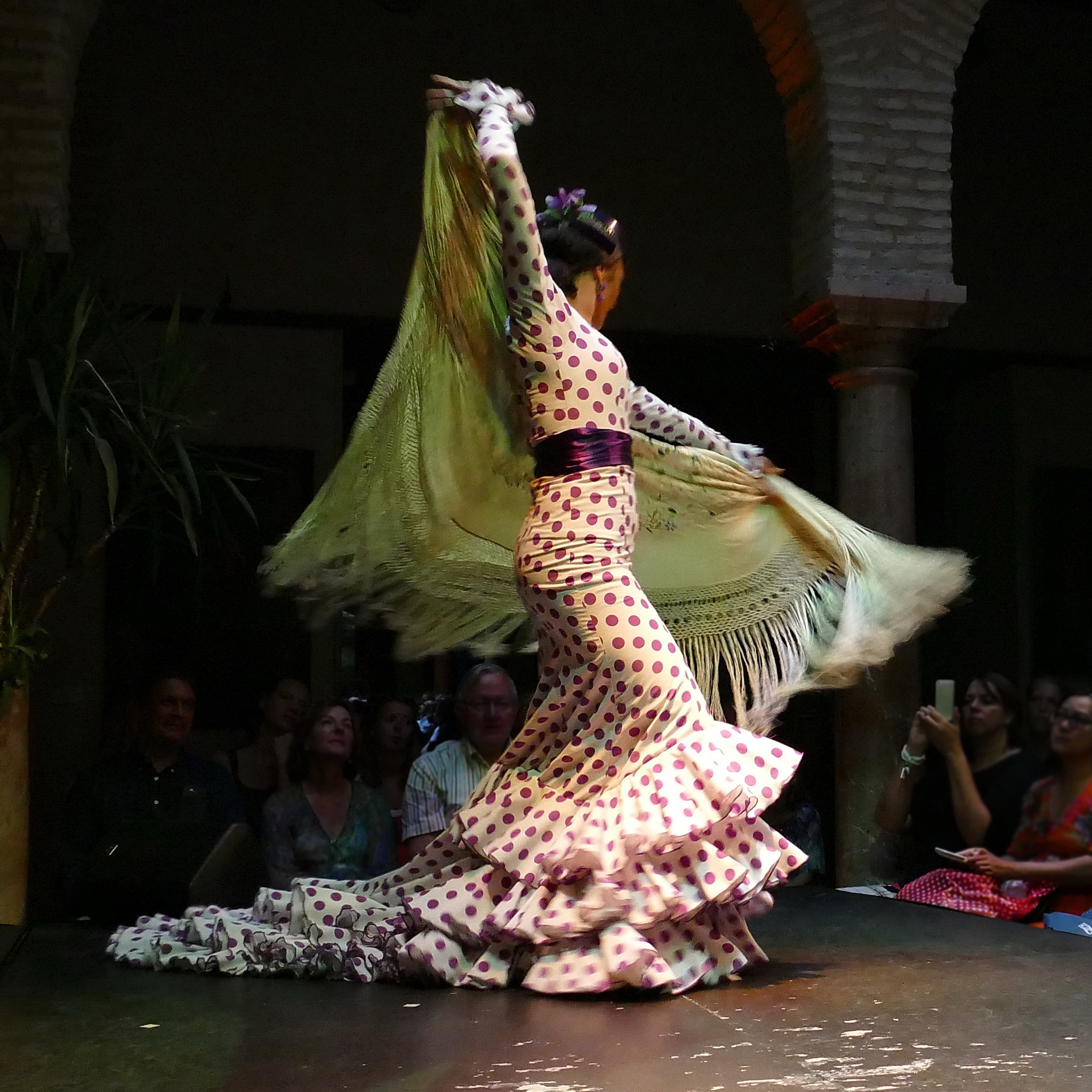
Woman dancing in a traditionally-styled flamenco dress with ruffles and polka dots, holding a manila shawl

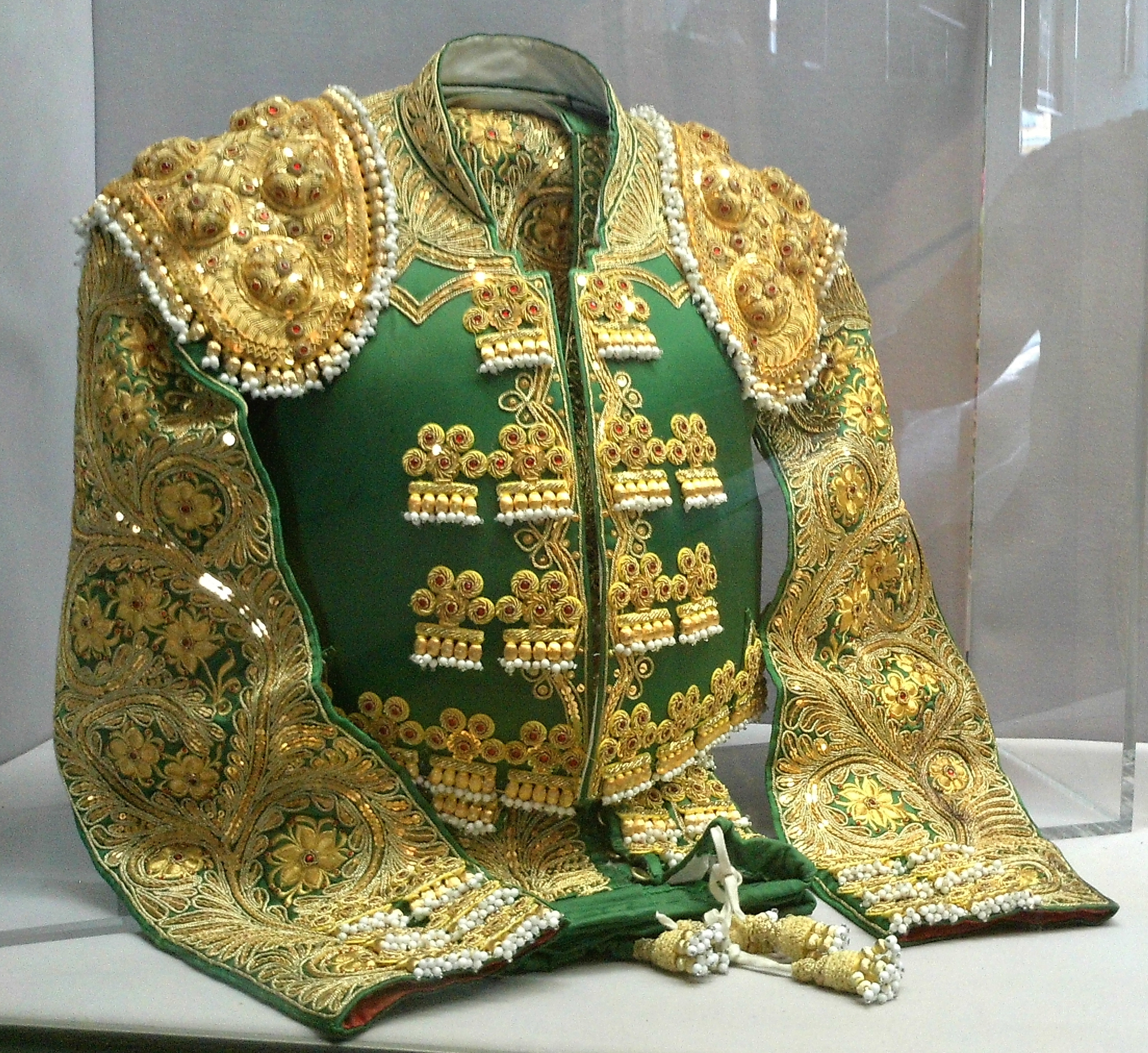
A matador's elaborately decorated chaquetilla, part of the traditional bullfighting costume

The Dance of the Twisted Bull (Spring/Summer 2002) is the nineteenth collection McQueen designed for his eponymous fashion house. It was inspired by Spanish culture and art, particularly the traditional clothing worn for flamenco dancing and bullfighting – traje de flamenca and traje de luces, respectively. The romantic, feminine collection incorporated ruffled and polka-dotted flamenco dresses, ornamented short jackets in the vein of the matador's traditional chaquetilla, and sharply tailored suits, the latter a McQueen staple. Some designs appeared to reference The Tailor's Pattern Book, a 1589 book of patterns by Spanish mathematician Juan de Alcega. Other historicist elements included corsets, which appeared integrated into garments and as outerwear. The collection's primary palette was red, black, and white. The darker colours of some ensembles referenced the moody work of Spanish painter Francisco Goya, and architectural elements referenced Spanish architect Antoni Gaudí. Writing in 2012, fashion historian Judith Watt noted that the collection's highly-feminine styling was in line with trends for 2002, although she also found a significant influence from sportswear.

McQueen described his customer for Twisted Bull as a woman wanting to look sexy at a nightclub, and consequently the collection had sexuality front and centre. Many outfits were styled to expose cleavage. Dresses were skintight, and some ensembles had cutouts exposing skin. On some runway looks, the breasts of the models were fully exposed. The form-fitting cut of the trouser suits emphasised the bodies of the models, and the use of masculine elements for womenswear subversively played up the sexual attractiveness of the traditional matador in a way that is often sidelined in Spanish culture. The juxtaposition of sexuality with violence and death and the tension between aggression and fragility were recurring themes in McQueen's work.

The clothing in Twisted Bull was far more commercial than McQueen's typical designs, which tended to be more artistic than practical. Making the collection accessible and customer-focused was a business decision for McQueen, intended to drive sales for his first season with Gucci. McQueen stated that the overt sexuality of the collection was explicitly intended to push sales, saying: "It's romantic and it's hot sex. That's what makes the world go around and it's what sells clothes too." McQueen's commercial strategy seemingly paid off; Gucci president Domenico De Sole reported that the brand saw a 400 per cent increase in sales compared to previous collections.

== Runway show ==
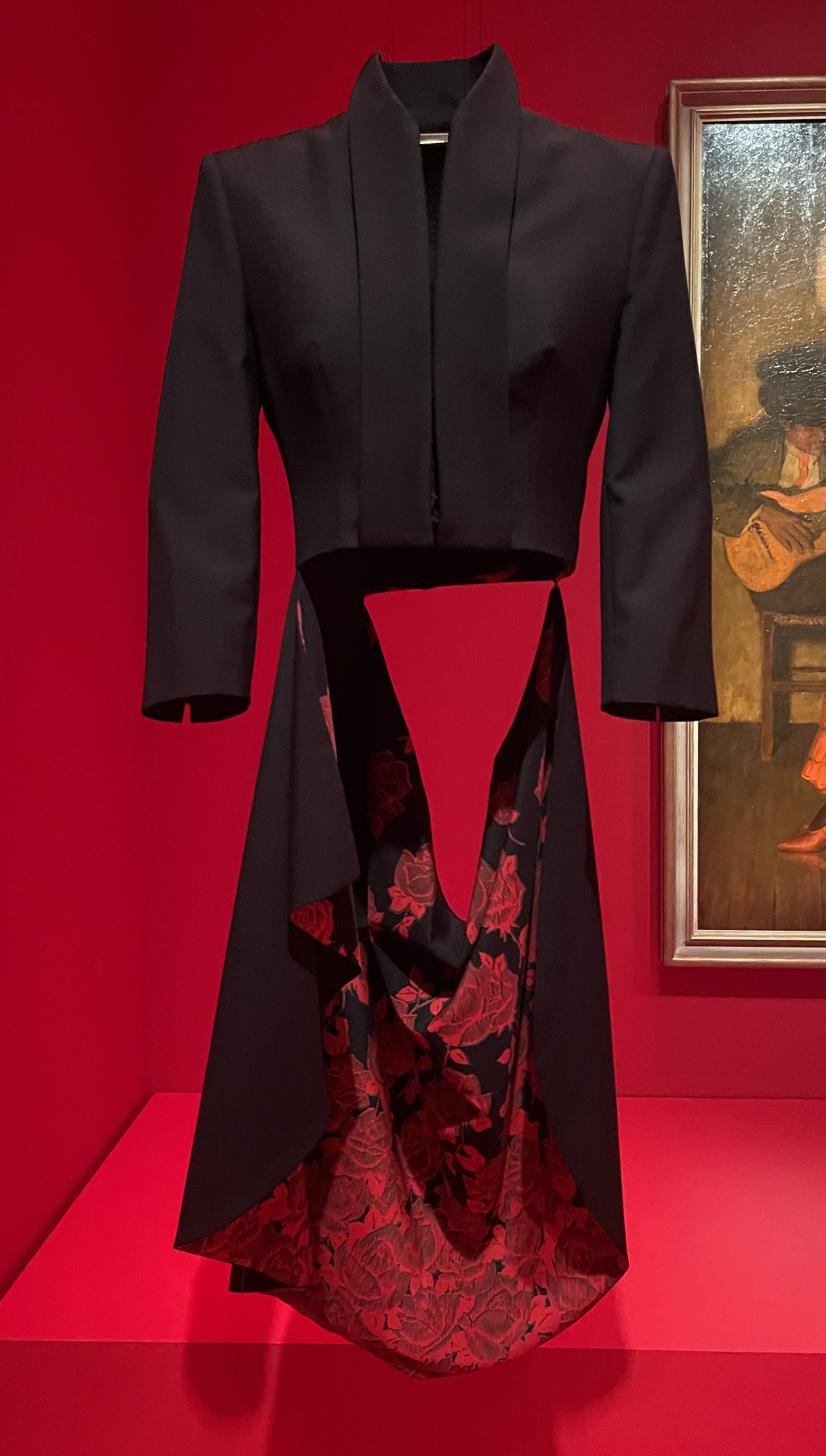
Jacket from Look 47 from the runway show, presented at Lee Alexander McQueen: Mind, Mythos, Muse (2023 staging)

The runway show for Twisted Bull was staged on 6 October 2001, during Paris Fashion Week, at the headquarters of the Stade Français sports club in the 16th arrondissement of Paris. (Note: Although the text of the Victoria & Albert Museum Savage Beauty catalogue says the show was held on 6 September, this is an error. The invitation photographed in the book says 6 October, and all other sources report an October date as well.) As a British designer, McQueen had always presented in London during London Fashion Week. Twisted Bull was the first collection he presented in Paris for his own label; he showed all his future womenswear collections there until his death in 2010. The show was sponsored by American Express, which had sponsored McQueen several times.

Production was overseen by Gainsbury & Whiting, and Katy England was in charge of overall styling. Joseph Bennett returned to handle set design. Headpieces were made by miliner Philip Treacy. Makeup artist Val Garland, then with MAC Cosmetics, styled makeup for the models. The look was dark and smoky, with a red, black, and grey colour palette that echoed the clothing. Stylist Guido Palau was responsible for the hair, which was given a retro style reminiscent of classic pin-up models and rockabilly fashion. The overall effect, according to Watt, was a grungy glamour that suggested the models had "crawled out of bed and thrown on something from the night before".

Unlike many of his previous shows, the runway show for Twisted Bull was relatively mundane, with no complex set pieces or performance aspects. Models entered and exited through a curtain of grey smoke at the rear of the stage, upon which video clips – flamenco dancing, bullfighting, and softcore pornography – were projected. The soundtrack was a combination of electronic tracks, flamenco guitar music, and Björk songs. Following the last model, the soundtrack changed to the sound of a woman moaning. A woman's face, apparently mid-coitus, was projected on the smokescreen. Her expression changed to one of fear, and the projection cut to a man swinging a sword. The smoke turned blood-red, and the models appeared en masse for a final turn.

=== Notable pieces ===
The collection's central showpiece was Look 33, worn on the runway by Irish model Laura Morgan. Look 33 is a long red and white ruffled flamenco-style dress designed to look as though it – and the model – had been pierced by decorative bullfighting spears. The long train of the dress was caught up on the spears in the back. The spears were created by jeweller Shaun Leane. Watt noted a similarity between the dress and a sketch of an impaled mermaid McQueen had made in 1990.

A second dress, Look 61, also incorporated weaponry. This look was a strapless black-and-white dress with a sword sewn into the skirt. On the runway, the model held the sword perpendicular to her body so that the skirt's train was lifted up behind her.

Jewellery designer Naomi Filmer created blown-glass body pieces for the collection at McQueen's request. Look 4 features "Ball in the Small of my Back", a sphere which fits over the wearer's hands while held behind them, dictating a dance-like posture with pulled-back shoulders.

== Reception ==
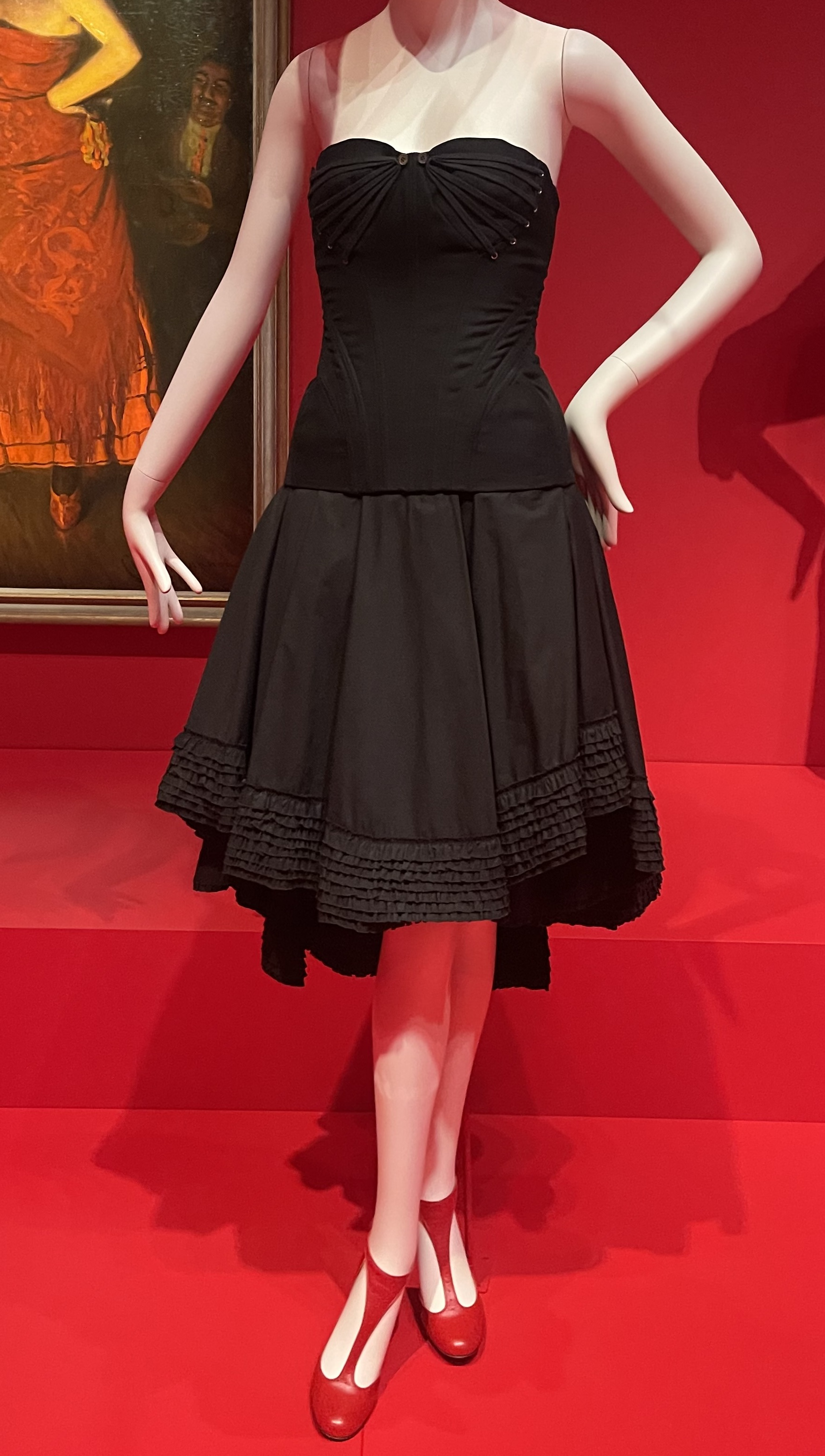
Dress from commercial release, presented at Lee Alexander McQueen: Mind, Mythos, Muse (2023 staging)

The collection was generally well-received by British critics, who appreciated its more commercial designs. Despite the low-key presentation, journalist Hilary Alexander called it a "powerful and passionate show". John Davidson of The Glasgow Herald called the collection "truly polished" and agreed with McQueen's decision to forgo theatrics for the show, although he found the sexuality excessive. An unbylined style brief in The Guardian criticised the appearance of drop crotch pants in the collection, describing them as "not a nice look". The staff writer at Vogue España noted that the influence was a series of Spanish cultural clichés but called the collection a "perfect adaptation" to his brand's new home at Gucci.

American critics were less impressed, particularly with the dressmaking. Writing for The New York Times, Cathy Horyn called the show "overwrought" and dismissed the style of the dresses as being like a "rigid satin party skirt of the 1950s genre". American fashion editor Robin Givhan found the tailoring excellent but found the "dressmaking flourishes were too showy and indulgent".

Critics called out Look 33, the spear-pierced dress, as the most significant look from the collection. American journalist Dana Thomas wrote that it was the collection's "most poignant look". Journalist Jess Cartner-Morley called it one of McQueen's "classic show pieces". Rebecca Lowthorpe of The Independent agreed, also calling out Look 14 for having a skirt which appeared to be made "entirely out of Spanish fans". On the other hand, Davidson criticised the spear dress as "masochistic tromp l'oeil nonsense".

Retrospective consensus is mostly positive towards Twisted Bull. Judith Watt found it "on trend" and a "sharp, contemporary take on sportswear". In the Little Book of Alexander McQueen, Karen Homer wrote that Twisted Bull was a "solid collection for a designer whose label had recently undergone big changes".

== Analysis ==
In her book Alexander McQueen: Evolution, Catherine Gleason reports that some audience members were upset by the use of sexual sounds and imagery of apparent sexual violence that concluded the show. Some critics found the content particularly shocking as it came less than a month after the September 11 attacks in the United States. Conversely, The Adelaide Advertiser suggested that the relatively low-key shows at Paris Fashion Week that season indicated a subdued feeling in the fashion world following 11 September. The concept for the show had in fact been developed approximately four months in advance, well before the terrorist incident. McQueen dismissed the idea that he should have altered his collection in response to the attacks, saying "There's no link between the two things as far as I can see."

Journalist Dana Thomas noted the parallel to an earlier Spanish-themed collection by British designer John Galliano during his time at Givenchy. The two men were often compared in the press due to their roughly parallel career arcs and similarly maximalist styles, and McQueen often sought to emulate or outdo Galliano's designs in his own work. Thomas argued that Twisted Bull was an effort to do so across an entire collection. Look 61, the dress which incorporated a sword, was similar to Look 10 from Galliano's Filibustiers (Spring/Summer 1993), a dress which also used a sword to hold up its train at an angle.

Fashion historian Ingrid Loschek discussed Twisted Bull as an example of McQueen's habit of playing with dichotomies, and his ability to express emotions and ideas through the styling of the clothes and the runway show. She noted particularly the transformation of the "confident flamenco dancer who becomes a victim herself when a lance 'skewers' body and dress".

== Legacy ==
McQueen revisited elements of the matador costume in Sarabande (Spring/Summer 2007), which featured several black and white ensembles with ruffled shirts and embroidery reminiscent of Spanish blackwork. One outfit had tight trousers like the matador's taleguilla, and one had beadwork resembling their traditional braces.

The Alexander McQueen archive retains ownership of Look 33, the spear-pierced dress. This look appeared in both stagings of the retrospective exhibition Alexander McQueen: Savage Beauty, where it was one of only two pieces from Twisted Bull to be featured. The other was Look 66, from the collection of Daphne Guinness: a beaded black jacket over beaded black jumpsuit, with a leather hat by Philip Treacy. Look 33 was used again for "Dark Angel", a 2015 retrospective editorial of McQueen's work in British Vogue by British fashion photographer Tim Walker. Several looks from Twisted Bull owned by the Los Angeles County Museum of Art appeared at the 2022 retrospective exhibition Lee Alexander McQueen: Mind, Mythos, Muse. The collection was placed in the Evolution and Existence section of the exhibition, which highlighted collections focused on "life cycles and the human condition".

== Bibliography ==
- Bolton, Andrew (2011). Alexander McQueen: Savage Beauty. New York: Metropolitan Museum of Art. ISBN 978-1-58839-412-5. Archived from the original on 4 March 2023.
  - Frankel, Susannah. Introduction. In Bolton (2011), pp. 17–27.
- Bowles, Hamish (2014). Vogue & the Metropolitan Museum of Art Costume Institute: Parties, Exhibitions, People. New York: Condé Nast. ISBN 978-1-4197-1424-5. OCLC 871511830.
- Esguerra, Clarissa M.; Hansen, Michaela (2022). Lee Alexander McQueen: Mind, Mythos, Muse. New York: Delmonico Books. ISBN 978-1-63681-018-8. OCLC 1289986708.
- Fairer, Robert; Wilcox, Claire (2016). Alexander McQueen: Unseen. New Haven, Connecticut: Yale University Press. ISBN 978-0-300-22267-8. OCLC 946216643.
- Gleason, Katherine (2012). Alexander McQueen: Evolution. New York: Race Point Publishing. ISBN 978-1-61058-837-9. Archived from the original on 5 January 2023.
- Homer, Karen (2023). Little Book of Alexander McQueen: The Story of the Iconic Brand. London: Welbeck Publishing Group. ISBN 978-1-80279-270-6.
- Lee, Selee (31 May 2018). "The Works of Naomi Filmer With Reference to Ecological Insights". Archives of Design Research (in Korean). 31 (2). Korean Society of Design Science. 3. 1. Space of Reversal. doi:10.15187/adr.2018.05.31.2.181. S2CID 149684827. Archived from the original on 6 December 2022.
- Loschek, Ingrid (2009). When Clothes Become Fashion: Design and Innovation Systems. Oxford: Berg Publishers. doi:10.2752/9781847883681. ISBN 978-0-85785-144-4. Archived from the original on 5 January 2023.
- Mora, Juliana Luna; Berry, Jess (2 September 2022). "Creative Direction Succession in Luxury Fashion: The Illusion of Immortality at Chanel and Alexander McQueen". Luxury. 9 (2–3): 117–140. doi:10.1080/20511817.2022.2194039. ISSN 2051-1817.
- Thomas, Dana (2015). Gods and Kings: The Rise and Fall of Alexander McQueen and John Galliano. New York City: Penguin Publishing. ISBN 978-1-101-61795-3.
- Watt, Judith (2012). Alexander McQueen: The Life and the Legacy. New York: Harper Design. ISBN 978-1-84796-085-6. OCLC 892706946.
- Wilcox, Claire, ed. (2015). Alexander McQueen. New York: Abrams Books. ISBN 978-1-4197-1723-9. OCLC 891618596.
  - Bethune, Kate. "Encyclopedia of Collections". In Wilcox (2015), pp. 303–326.
  - Evans, Caroline. "Modelling McQueen: Hard Grace". In Wilcox (2015), pp. 189–202.
- Wilson, Andrew (2015). Alexander McQueen: Blood Beneath the Skin. New York: Simon and Schuster. ISBN 978-1-4767-7674-3.
