= Diane Kendal =

British-born makeup artist

- Born: Diane Kendal; United Kingdom
- Occupation: Make-up artist

Diane Kendal is a British-born make-up artist currently residing in New York City. She is the creative director for Rabanne Beauty.

Kendal was previously the beauty product consultant and make-up artist for Marc Jacobs Beauty, and has developed product lines for Zara Beauty and Calvin Klein Cosmetics.

== Career ==
Kendal studied special-effect make-up and prosthetics at the London College of Fashion. When she met her fellow students studying photography, design, and hair styling, she realized she could make a career in the fashion industry. "I tried to do movie make-up, but I never got that far," Kendal said in a 2001 interview in Harper's Bazaar. She added: "So, I worked with college friends who were photographers in London." She began test-shooting with then up-and-coming photographers such as David Sims and Nathaniel Goldberg. She also began travel to Milan and Paris, assisting make-up artists such as Stephane Marais while honing her technical expertise.

After graduating in 1981, Kendal began her career working for UK publications, such as Girl About Town and Miss London. In the '90s, she moved to New York City, and along with hairstylist and close friend Guido Palau, she became known in the grunge movement, which was prevalent in the fashion industry at that time.

In 1988, Kendal received her first significant job – a fashion story for Italian Vogue with model Cordula Reyer and photographer Albert Watson.

Designer Calvin Klein collaborated with Kendal in 1997, asking her to design a cosmetic line for the brand. Her line included the Calvin Klein Cheek Color Washes, among other products, which developed a celebrity following amongst the likes of Julia Roberts and Hilary Swank. In the same year, she also shot her first Vogue cover for December—working with models Shalom Harlow and Georgina Grenville, and photographed by Steven Meisel.

In 2021, Kendal became the creative director for Zara Beauty. She worked on the brand's beauty product development, and she also designed a playful collection of beauty products for kids. The collection 'Mini Artists' was launched by Zara Beauty in February 2023.

In late 2023, Kendal was appointed as creative director of Rabanne Beauty.

Today, Kendal works with photographers that include David Sims, Craig McDean, Mert Alas and Marcus Piggott, Patrick Demarchelier, and Mario Sorrenti. Her makeup styling appears in Italian, French, Japanese, and American Vogue, W Magazine, Allure Magazine, and Interview Magazine, as well as in advertising campaigns for Marc Jacobs, Chloé, Calvin Klein, Dolce & Gabbana, Oscar de la Renta, Yves Saint Laurent Beauté, and Tom Ford. Kendal has created runway looks for designers that include Balenciaga, Roberto Cavalli, Proenza Schouler, Alexander Wang, and Carolina Herrera.

== Personal life ==
Kendal maintains a close personal and working relationship with hairstylist Guido Palau. She and her daughter, Em Kendal Watson, reside in Carroll Gardens, Brooklyn.
