= What a Merry-Go-Round =

2001 fashion collection by Alexander McQueen

Look 67 as presented on the runway

What a Merry-Go-Round is the eighteenth collection by British fashion designer Alexander McQueen, released for the Autumn/Winter 2001 season of his eponymous fashion house. The collection drew on imagery of clowns and carnivals, inspired by McQueen's feelings about childhood and his experiences in the fashion industry. The designs were influenced by military chic, cinema such as Nosferatu (1922) and Cabaret (1972), 1920s flapper fashion, and the French Revolution. The palette comprised dark colours complemented with neutrals and muted greens. The show marked the first appearance of the skull motif that became a signature of the McQueen brand.

The collection's runway show was staged on 21 February 2001 at the Gatliff Road Warehouse in London, as part of London Fashion Week. It was McQueen's final show in London; all his future collections were presented in Paris. Sixty-two looks were presented in the main runway show, with at least six more in the finale. (Note: For convenience, when referring to individual looks, this article uses the numbering from the Vogue retrospective of the collection. Their overview counts 67 looks, but contains some duplications and omissions that cause the count to be unclear. Look numbers mentioned in this article have not been adjusted. Vogue omits the ensemble which opened the show, a long-sleeved brown leather jacket over pants; a dark patterned pantsuit following Look 12; an orange and green ensemble following Look 40; and a black vest with loose black pants following Look 47. Additionally, the Vogue image for Look 13 shows Looks 14 and 15 in one image. Looks 63 through 67 were from the finale. It is not clear how many looks were presented in this phase; some that appear in the video of the runway show appear to be omitted from Vogue, and the Vogue images for Looks 65 and 66 show two models each.) The show was staged in a dark room with a carousel at the centre. During the finale, the lights came up to reveal piles of discarded childhood bric-à-brac at the rear of the stage, while models dressed as evil clowns cavorted around the stage, posing in their eveningwear.

Critical response to the collection was generally positive, and it has attracted some academic analysis for the theme and messaging. Like McQueen's previous show Voss (Spring/Summer 2001), Merry-Go-Round served as a critique of the fashion industry, which he sometimes described as toxic and suffocating. It contained elements that several authors have taken as references to French luxury goods conglomerate LVMH and its management, with whom McQueen had a turbulent relationship. Ensembles from Merry-Go-Round have appeared in exhibitions such as the McQueen retrospective Alexander McQueen: Savage Beauty.

== Background ==
British fashion designer Alexander McQueen was known for his imaginative, sometimes controversial designs, and dramatic fashion shows. Over the course of his career, which lasted from 1992 until his death in 2010, he explored a broad range of ideas and themes, particularly sexuality, death, femininity, romanticism, and historicism. His collections were strongly historicist, referencing and reworking historical narratives and concepts. McQueen began his career in fashion as an apprentice with Savile Row tailors, which earned him a reputation as an expert tailor. McQueen had a difficult relationship with the fashion industry, which he sometimes described as toxic and suffocating. He was often ambivalent about continuing his career in fashion. Several of McQueen's collections, including the preceding show, Voss (Spring/Summer 2001), were intended as commentary and critique on the industry.

From October 1996 to October 2001, McQueen was – in addition to his responsibilities for his own label – head designer at French fashion house Givenchy, owned by luxury goods conglomerate LVMH. His time there was fraught, primarily because of creative differences between him, the label, and the management at LVMH. In December 2000, before his Givenchy contract ended, McQueen signed a deal with Gucci, an Italian fashion house and rival to Givenchy, effectively daring LVMH to fire him. (Note: They did not, but they did cancel his final catwalk show, scheduled for March 2001, replacing it with a pair of simple presentations to a very small number of invitees. They also sent out a press release declaring that it was "normal that Mr. McQueen should seek financing for his tiny business"; the use of the word "tiny" reportedly upset McQueen a great deal.) Gucci bought 51 per cent of McQueen's company, retaining him as its creative director. What a Merry-Go-Round was the last collection he produced for his own label while with Givenchy.

McQueen's career roughly paralleled that of fellow British designer John Galliano, who preceded him in the industry by about a decade. Their designs and shows were similarly creative and theatrical. During the period in which their careers overlapped, fashion journalists compared and contrasted their work and career choices, and they have sometimes been referred to as rivals. McQueen, who had a competitive streak, resented being compared to Galliano and often sought to emulate or outdo Galliano's ideas in his own work.

== Concept and collection ==
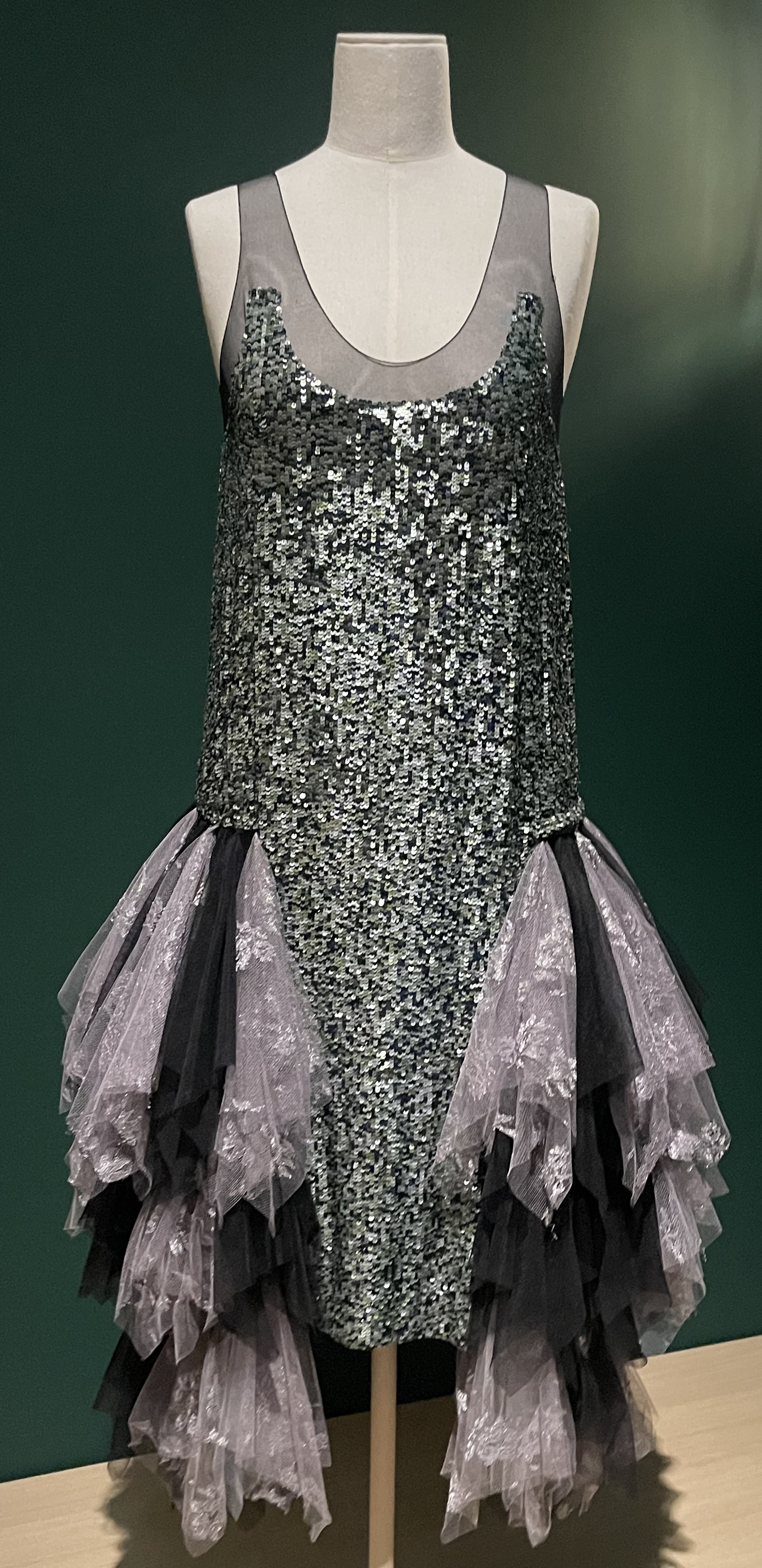
Look 44 presented at Lee Alexander McQueen: Mind, Mythos, Muse at Musée national des beaux-arts du Québec

What a Merry-Go-Round (Autumn/Winter 2001) is the eighteenth collection McQueen made for his eponymous fashion house. It was inspired by the dark underside of clowns, carnivals, and circuses, as well as the Child Catcher villain from the film Chitty Chitty Bang Bang (1968). As was typical for McQueen, he pulled from his own life to inform his designs. In this case, he connected the vulnerability of childhood to his turbulent experiences with the fashion industry. McQueen explicitly drew on the fear of clowns in describing his vision: "We show children clowns as if they are funny. They're not. They're really scary." The carousel at the centre of the show represented the ride his career had been for the preceding year.

Additional inspiration came from the German silent vampire film Nosferatu (1922) and the cabaret shows of Weimar Germany, by way of the film Cabaret (1972). McQueen intended the collection's designs to be relatively unified in order to allow him to build a consistent visual identity for his brand. He felt that previous collections had had too many ideas he had not fully capitalised on.

The overall colour palette was dark. Most early looks featured neutral colours, and orange and green becoming more prominent later on. Skulls and harlequin patterns were a repeat motif. Primary materials included leather and jersey, embellished with sequins, lace, and peacock and ostrich feathers. The influence of military chic was clear in khaki items, garments tailored to resemble uniforms, and a headpiece of antique-looking aeroplanes. McQueen called these designs a reflection of the "regimented aspect of childhood". Many designs were reworked from earlier collections, including Joan (Autumn/Winter 1998), Eshu (Autumn/Winter 2000), and Voss.

McQueen's interest in historical fashion was a strong influence on the collection. Large greatcoats and gold braid drew aesthetically on the French Revolution, while other items, particularly the bias cut sheath dresses, were influenced by the clothing worn by flappers of the 1920s. Textile curators Clarissa M. Esguerra and Michaela Hansen identified Look 44, a sequined dress with ruffles at the hips, as exemplary of this influence in the collection. They argued that it was McQueen's reinterpretation of the robe de style, a 1920s silhouette characterised by a straight-cut top with a more voluminous skirt at the hips. They saw the sequins and colours as reminiscent of Weimar cabaret.

Several looks included accessories made from taxidermy pheasant claws clutching strings of Tahitian pearls, made by McQueen's longtime collaborator Shaun Leane. A classically-trained jeweller, Leane had to teach himself taxidermy in order to craft these items; he later replicated the pheasant claw earrings for his jewellery line.

== Runway show ==
=== Production details ===
The runway show was staged on 21 February 2001, at the Gatliff Road Warehouse in London. It was the last of six shows McQueen held there, and his final major show in his home city; all his future womenswear collections were staged in Paris. The invitations used an image by Ferdinando Scianna: an elderly-looking clown wearing a red, white, and blue outfit, echoing the tricoloured flag of France.

The audience were first led into gated standing-room-only area which journalist Maggie Alderson derisively described as "holding pens", where they were made to wait for half an hour before being allowed to take their seats, to the irritation of many. Notable audience members included model Kate Moss, actress Bianca Jagger, media executive Nicholas Coleridge, and Domenico de Sole, then-CEO of Gucci.

McQueen typically worked with a consistent creative team for his shows, which he planned with Katy England, his assistant and primary stylist. Gainsbury & Whiting oversaw production. Joseph Bennett returned for set design. Hair was styled by Guido Palau, with make-up by Val Garland. Philip Treacy created headpieces, while Shaun Leane was responsible for jewellery; both were longtime collaborators of McQueen's. Waterford Crystal produced a walking stick made from crystal and bone.

=== Catwalk presentation ===
The collection was presented in a dimly-lit room with a circular stage, the floor painted in a spiral of grey and blue. The centrepiece was a large antique carousel, the horses covered in black, purple, and lavender latex. At the rear, the stage was piled with childhood bric-à-brac including stuffed toys, puppets, balloons, and skeletons, all covered in dust, suggesting an old-fashioned child's nursery, a toy shop, or an attic filled with discarded possessions. These items were in darkness for much of the show, revealed only for the finale.

The show opened with an audio clip of the Child Catcher in which he attempts to lure children with treats so he can capture them. The rest of the backing music included heavy metal music, the theme song from Chitty Chitty Bang Bang, and selections from the soundtrack of horror film Rosemary's Baby (1968) including the lullaby "Sleep Safe and Warm". "A Spoonful of Sugar" from Mary Poppins (1964) played over the finale.

The performance direction for the models was aggressive – Claire Wilcox wrote that they walked "like dominatrixes", while the Vogue reviewer called them "hard-as-nails". Models were styled with stark white face make-up as a base, reminiscent of Pierrot, a sad clown stock character from pantomime theatre. In the main section of the show, the models wore dark lips in a style typical of the 1930s and loose hair styled in Marcel waves. In the finale, they wore dark clown make-up and wigs teased into shapes, including some three-pointed styles. Fashion theorist Janice Miller considered it "emblematic" of villains from children's media.

Sixty-two looks were presented in the main runway show, with at least six more in the finale. Models walked around the carousel, some using its poles to twirl around. Look 34, a black dress, was styled with a gold fox skeleton draped over the model's shoulders to mimic a fox fur stole. Look 35 was a coat with a high, asymmetrical collar and Chinese-inspired embroidery in light green. Look 37 featured a showpiece necklace of Tahitian pearls and pheasant claws made by Shaun Leane. The long strands of pearls suggested 1920s fashion, while the mass of claws deceptively resembled fur and hinted at morbidity. Look 48 featured a helmet with large black feathers and decorative metal skull made by Philip Treacy, worn with a see-through slip of black with purple embroidery. Ana Honigman described the model as looking as though she were "half-siren and half-Valkyrie".

Following Look 62, a black knit dress with white skull on the front, the lights went down, then came back up, illuminating the carousel as well as the decor at the rear of the stage. Several models styled as evil clowns with dark clown make-up and large wigs dusted with cobwebs cavorted around the stage, posing in their eveningwear. One of these models had a gold skeleton – originally a piece of set decoration from Dante (Autumn/Winter 1996) – attached to her ankle. Another wore a bias cut dress in silver which exposed the model's breast, reminiscent of the 1830 painting Liberty Leading the People by Eugène Delacroix. Erin O'Connor became entangled in balloons on the side of the stage while making her entrance, dragging them to the centre of the carousel. Other models cut the balloons away to free her. (Note: Caroline Evans describes this as an improvised moment created when O'Connor accidentally became tangled in the balloons. Other sources, like Katherine Gleason, treat it as intentional.) After several minutes, the lights came up fully and the models walked out to take their final turn, followed by McQueen taking his bow and shaking de Sole's hand.

== Reception ==
=== Contemporary ===
What a Merry-Go-Round was positively received by fashion critics upon its debut. De Sole, who would effectively be McQueen's manager at Gucci, called the collection "fantastic". Reviewers were generally pleased with the showmanship: Hilary Alexander wrote that it was "as striking as it was sinister", while Booth Moore at the Los Angeles Times called it "Broadway-worthy". Several felt it was the most exciting presentation of the season. Alexander complained that McQueen's was the only show worth seeing that Fashion Week, and wrote that it demonstrated "the huge gulf between a good designer and a genius". Both Maggie Alderson and Alexia Economou felt McQueen had used the season's trends – such as military chic, one-shoulder dresses, and tailored suits – better than any of the other designers presenting that week.

Despite the theatrics of the presentation, critics felt the designs had commercial potential, especially the draped dresses and tailored suits. John Davidson felt the clothing would be best for "confident, assured women prepared to stand out from the fashion crowd". Writing for The Independent, Susannah Frankel praised the way McQueen played with contrasts of "masculine and feminine, ultra-romantic and brutally sharp". Similarly, Lisa Armstrong felt McQueen's juxtaposition of opposing concepts was what made "his vision so modern". Alexander and Suzy Menkes both spoke positively of the unusual palette of colours and patterns. The military-themed items were a highlight for many reviewers. Others noted the leatherwork in the collection. Jess Cartner-Morley and Frankel both liked pieces from early in the collection, where the material had been shaped to resemble small scales. Menkes and Moore pointed to leather skirts cut in lace-like patterns, with Menkes especially charmed by one cut to show "a strutting peacock to echo a feathered bodice".

There was some criticism of the collection. The staff reviewer at Women's Wear Daily (WWD) enjoyed it, but felt that the theme and the designs were not as balanced as they had been in McQueen's past collections. They concluded that although he had not outdone his past successes, it was unfair to expect him to do so. For them, it was "enough that he constantly surpasses so many other designers". Cathy Horyn, fashion critic for The New York Times, felt it was "less coherent" than Voss had been, and called the military items "harsh". Alderson suspected a Nazi influence to the military designs, which she called shameful and "very hard to forgive". Menkes felt McQueen was too young to be reworking his earlier designs, although she felt the results were very polished. Kate Foster at The Scotsman disagreed with the general consensus of wearability and felt the clothes would "never be worn by real women". The unnamed reviewer for the Ottawa Citizen wondered what the theatrics "have to do with clothes" Alderson also felt the lighting was too dark and the seats too far from the stage.

=== Retrospective ===
Writing in retrospect, curator Kate Bethune felt that the reworked designs from earlier collections indicated that McQueen had succeeded in creating a "consolidating collection". She found it commercial in a positive way, highlighting the wearability of the bias-cut dresses. In a 2015 retrospective, Dazed magazine called Merry-Go-Round one of McQueen's darkest shows. Fashion theorists Adam Geczy and Vicki Karaminas regard What a Merry-Go-Round as "unjustly overshadowed" by the preceding collection, Voss.

Despite its positive reception, Merry-Go-Round was not one of McQueen's personal favourites. Shortly after the show, The New York Times quoted him as saying "it wasn't the strongest I've ever done". In a 2004 interview, he said he could not "bear to look back at" it, as he felt the show had completely eclipsed the actual designs.

== Analysis ==
Liberty Leading the People by Eugène Delacroix, 1830. Several authors believe a silver dress in the finale is a reference to this painting.

Many authors regard elements of the collection as being aimed toward the management at French conglomerate LVMH, with whom McQueen had a turbulent relationship. Some contemporary reviewers commented along these lines, with the WWD review calling it an "unsubtle comment" on his disputes with them. Judith Watt cited the reference to Liberty Leading the People as a general message to LVMH. Dana Thomas considered the use of the Child Catcher's voice a direct allusion to LVMH founder Bernard Arnault. Karen Homer concurred, writing that the elements from the French Revolution were a message indicating that McQueen was now free from LVMH. Bethune noted that ironically, despite all the messaging about being free from the French company, all of McQueen's future shows were staged in Paris.

Elements of the collection may have been a reference to the work of John Galliano. In her review for The Times, Armstrong wrote that she felt McQueen had intended his eveningwear as a direct challenge to Galliano, who was known for his romantic evening gowns. Thomas highlighted a number of Galliano references. Many models wore Marcel waves, which Galliano had been using extensively at that time. Others wore the three-pointed wigs, which mimicked those used in the Galliano show Filibustiers (Spring/Summer 1993). The 1930s-style make-up worn by some models also echoed Galliano's runway styling. Many designs were interpretations of Galliano standards like slip dresses, biker jackets, military coats, and sashes.

Some critics focused on the semiotics of the dark clown make-up. Fashion theorist Caroline Evans felt that it produced a "mournful and alienated image", showcasing the underside of the circus. For Miller, the harsh make-up paired with the graceful dresses "mirror[ed] the way McQueen oscillated between beauty and horror" in designing for women. Geczy and Karaminas wrote that the make-up transformed the models into "something uninvitingly ghastly and vampiric". Unlike models in most shows, whose purpose is to showcase beauty, the models in this show appeared as "predators and phantoms".

There were some comments about the gold skeleton worn with Look 34. In their contemporary reviews, Armstrong and Avril Groom remarked on the absence of fur in the collection, which McQueen had been regularly using for the past few years. Armstrong thought the skeleton was a "politically correct alternative to the fox stole". Groom described it as an indication that McQueen had given "his macabre sense of humour full rein". Author Kristin Knox called it an example of McQueen's "remanipulation of the macabre into a thing of true exquisite beauty".

Evans considered the show an example of the double-sided nature of fashion: both frivolous and morbid at once in its transience. Geczy and Karaminas, picking up the thread of Evans' analysis, identified the performance aspect of Merry-Go-Round as an example of McQueen's "critically incisive" creative practice. The circus theme combined with the references to death and loss of innocence suggested to them a "world of fallen and jaded entertainers". They interpreted this as McQueen's commentary on the "imagined reality" of the fashion industry. They also compared the collection's narrative to that of The Overlook (Autumn/Winter 1999), which had a melancholy winter setting. They felt both collections suggested "the loss of childhood innocence". Valerie Steele wrote that the skeleton grasping the model's ankle was a reference to death symbolism in the Middle Ages.

== Legacy ==
Merry-Go-Round marked the first appearance of the skull motif that became a signature of the brand.

When McQueen and Leane participated in the Fashion in Motion series at the Victoria and Albert Museum (V&A) in 2001, they presented the pearl and pheasant necklace as one of their featured items. Two items from Merry-Go-Round appeared in the "Romantic Mind" section of Alexander McQueen: Savage Beauty, a retrospective exhibition of McQueen's designs: a black coatdress and a black ensemble with gold military-style embellishments. The skull hat from Look 48 and a single pheasant claw earring with white pearls from Look 60 were placed in the Cabinet of Curiosities section with other accessories. Look 62, the black knit dress with the skull design, appeared in the 2013 exhibition Punk: Chaos to Couture at the Metropolitan Museum of Art.

Look 44 appeared in the exhibition Lee Alexander McQueen: Mind, Mythos, Muse, originally staged in 2022 at the Los Angeles County Museum of Art. The garment is owned by the LACMA.

Some of McQueen's friends and collaborators have auctioned items from Merry-Go-Round. In 2017, Leane auctioned a number of pieces he had created for the house at Sotheby's in New York, including several from Merry-Go-Round. The pheasant claw and pearl necklace as well as the claw and pearl earrings from Look 60 were listed, but there is no final sale price noted for these items. The claw and pearl earrings from Look 32 sold for $13,750. A claw and pearl epaulette from Look 47 sold for $22,500. McQueen's friend Alice Smith auctioned a collection of McQueen memorabilia in 2020; an invitation from Merry-Go-Round sold for $334.

== Bibliography ==
- Alexander McQueen | Women's Autumn/Winter 2001 | Runway Show. Alexander McQueen. 12 March 2012 – via YouTube.
- Bolton, Andrew (2011). Alexander McQueen: Savage Beauty. New York City: Metropolitan Museum of Art. ISBN 978-1-58839-412-5. OCLC 687693871.
  - Frankel, Susannah. Introduction. In Bolton (2011), pp. 17–27.
- Bolton, Andrew (2013). Punk: Chaos to Couture. New York City: Metropolitan Museum of Art. ISBN 978-1-58839-489-7. OCLC 844976188.
- Breward, Christopher (2003). Fashion. Oxford History of Art. Oxford: Oxford University Press. ISBN 978-0-19-158773-3. OCLC 51315397.
- Esguerra, Clarissa M.; Hansen, Michaela (2022). Lee Alexander McQueen: Mind, Mythos, Muse. New York City: Delmonico Books. ISBN 978-1-63681-018-8. OCLC 1289986708.
- Evans, Caroline (2003). Fashion at the Edge: Spectacle, Modernity and Deathliness. New Haven, Connecticut: Yale University Press. ISBN 978-0-300-10192-8.
- Fairer, Robert; Wilcox, Claire (2016). Alexander McQueen: Unseen. New Haven, Connecticut: Yale University Press. ISBN 978-0-300-22267-8. OCLC 946216643.
- Geczy, Adam; Karaminas, Vicki (13 June 2019). Fashion Installation: Body, Space, and Performance. London: Bloomsbury Visual Arts. ISBN 978-1-350-03253-8.
- Gleason, Katherine (2012). Alexander McQueen: Evolution. New York City: Race Point Publishing. ISBN 978-1-61058-837-9. OCLC 783147416.
- Homer, Karen (2023). Little Book of Alexander McQueen: The Story of the Iconic Brand. London: Welbeck Publishing Group. ISBN 978-1-80279-270-6.
- Honigman, Ana Finel (2021). What Alexander McQueen Can Teach You About Fashion. London: Frances Lincoln. ISBN 978-0-7112-5906-5.
- Knox, Kristin (2010). Alexander McQueen: Genius of a Generation. London: A&C Black. ISBN 978-1-4081-3223-4. OCLC 794296806.
- Mora, Juliana Luna; Berry, Jess (2 September 2022). "Creative Direction Succession in Luxury Fashion: The Illusion of Immortality at Chanel and Alexander McQueen". Luxury. 9 (2–3): 117–140. doi:10.1080/20511817.2022.2194039. ISSN 2051-1817.
- Steele, Valerie (2008). Gothic: Dark Glamour. New Haven, Connecticut: Yale University Press. pp. 1–114. ISBN 978-0-300-13694-4.
- Thomas, Dana (2015). Gods and Kings: The Rise and Fall of Alexander McQueen and John Galliano. New York City: Penguin Publishing. ISBN 978-1-101-61795-3. OCLC 951153602.
- Watt, Judith (2012). Alexander McQueen: The Life and the Legacy. New York City: Harper Design. ISBN 978-1-84796-085-6. OCLC 892706946.
- Wilcox, Claire, ed. (2015). Alexander McQueen. New York City: Abrams Books. ISBN 978-1-4197-1723-9. OCLC 891618596.
  - Bethune, Kate. "Encyclopedia of Collections". In Wilcox (2015), pp. 303–326.
  - Evans, Caroline. "Modelling McQueen: Hard Grace". In Wilcox (2015), pp. 189–201.
  - Lodwick, Keith. "Coup de Théâtre". In Wilcox (2015), pp. 247–251.
  - Miller, Janice. "Making-Up". In Wilcox (2015), pp. 234–241.
- Wilson, Andrew (2015). Alexander McQueen: Blood Beneath the Skin. New York City: Simon and Schuster. ISBN 978-1-4767-7674-3. OCLC 1310585849.
