= Robert Fairer =

British fashion photographer

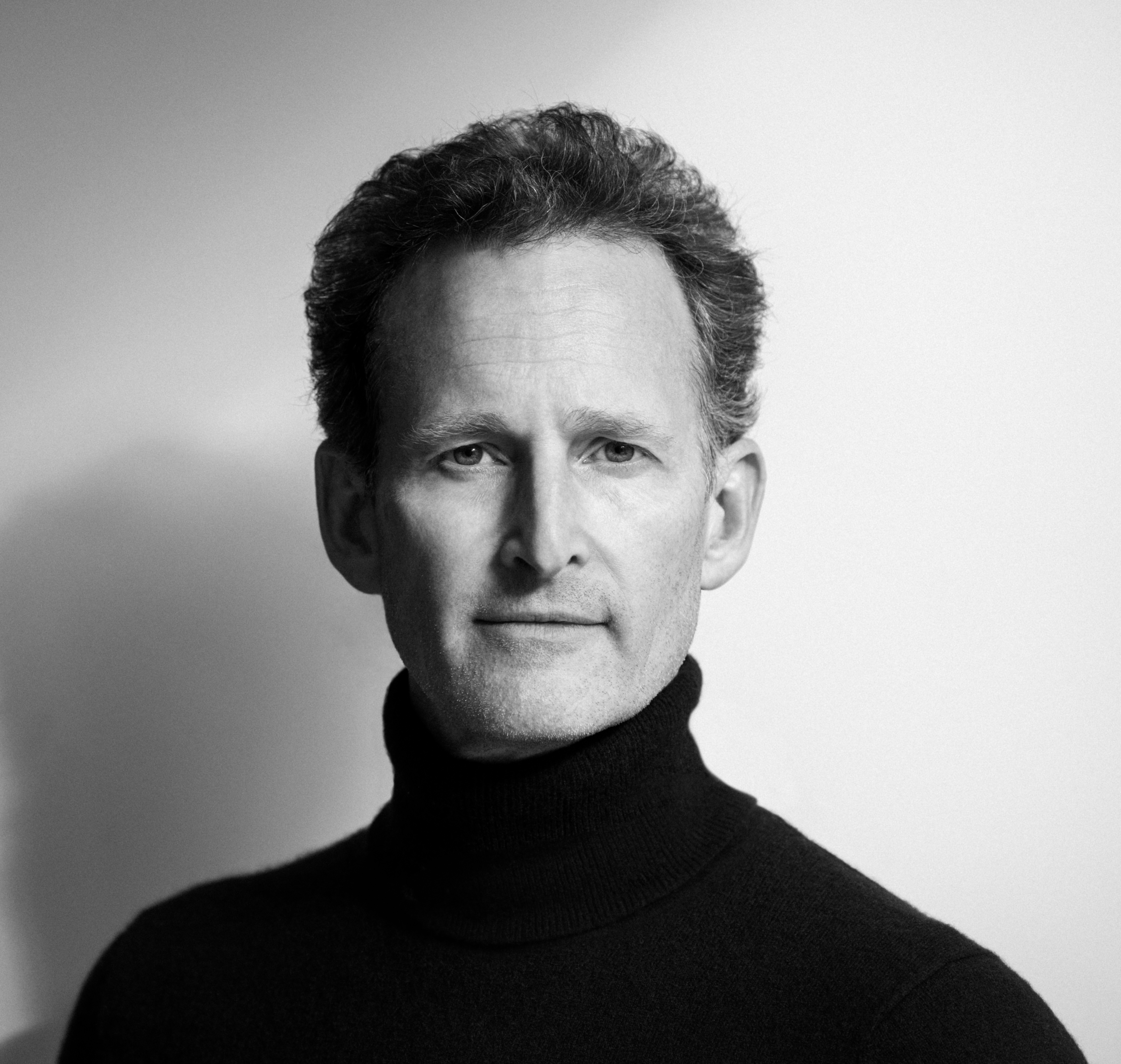
- Born: 1966 (age 59–60)
- Occupation: Photographer

Robert Fairer (born 1966) is a British fashion photographer who is known for his backstage photography in the 1990s until the 2010s. Working for American Vogue, Elle and Harper's Bazaar, his behind-the-scenes shots of supermodels, fashion designers, makeup artists, hair stylists and accessories designers would come to define the magazines 'front of the book'. His first solo exhibition 'Robert Fairer Backstage Pass: Dior, Galliano, Jacobs, and McQueen' was held at SCAD Fash Museum of Fashion. His work is included in the permanent collection of the National Gallery of Victoria and has been exhibited at the Victoria & Albert Museum, V&A Dundee, The Design Museum, Musée national des beaux‑arts du Québec, LACMA, the Fine Arts Museums of San Francisco and the National Gallery of Victoria.

== Early life and career ==
Fairer was born in 1966 in London. He grew up on King's Road and was never without a camera. Being part of London's emerging art and fashion scene in the 1980s and 1990s, he began photographing friends and was encouraged to pursue a career in photography. Fascinated by wildlife photography, he traveled to Africa for three months with a telephoto lens to document the animals on the savannah. With the help of his wife and agent, he gained access to London Graduate Week in 1992, and photographed the Central Saint Martins graduate show which featured the collection of Lee Alexander McQueen. Fairer graduated from London School of Printing in 1993, and soon became a household name at fashion week in London, Milan, Paris and New York. With his Hasselblad camera, he discovered the backstage area by chance and began photographing behind the scenes beauty stories and supermodels minutes before they walked onto the catwalk. He was one of the only backstage photographers and the stories didn't exist in the fashion magazines at the time. He used a 35mm camera and changed to medium format in the 1990s before changing to digital. He would try to sell his stories after the catwalk shows and bring a suitcase with transparencies and a portable lightbox to magazine editors including Fashion Editor Isabella Blow at Vogue magazine and Terry Jones at i-D magazine. From 1995 to 2001 he worked as a contributing photographer for Elle UK, Harper's Bazaar US and InStyle magazine. In 2001 he was hired by American Vogue and became the magazine's contracted lensman working with Editor-in-chief Anna Wintour and Fashion Editor André Leon Talley on backstage, runway, editorial, celebrity and wedding stories. Directed to capture "life in the pictures," his backstage photographs would cover up to 15 pages in Vogue's front of book. Having exclusive backstage access for a decade was made to a halt with the 2009 recession and arrival of social media.

Fairer began digitizing his archive after working with the Victoria & Albert Museum on their publication accompanying the Alexander McQueen: Savage Beauty exhibition in 2015.

He has published five books devoted to his backstage photography. In 2021 his first solo exhibition 'Robert Fairer Backstage Pass: Dior, Galliano, Jacobs, and McQueen,' was held at SCAD Fash Museum of Fashion and curated by director of fashion exhibitions Rafael Gomes. The exhibition showcased the glamour and spirit of backstage from 1998 to 2010. It featured shots of supermodels Gisele Bundchen, Naomi Campbell, Kate Moss, makeup artists Pat McGrath and Val Garland, hair stylists Julien D'Ys and Orlando Pita, and milliners Stephen Jones and Philip Treacy.

== Publications ==
- Alexander McQueen: Unseen, Robert Fairer, Sally Singer, Claire Wilcox, 2016, ISBN 9780300222678
- John Galliano: Unseen, Robert Fairer, André Leon Talley, Claire Wilcox, 2017, ISBN 0300228953
- Marc Jacobs: Unseen, Robert Fairer, Sally Singer, André Leon Talley, 2018, ISBN 1419732838
- John Galliano for Dior, Robert Fairer, André Leon Talley, Oriole Cullen et al., 2019, ISBN 0500022402
- Karl Lagerfeld Unseen: The Chanel Years, Robert Fairer, Sally Singer, Natasha A. Fraser, Elizabeth von Thurn und Taxis, 2022, ISBN 1419762850

== See also ==
- Fashion photography
