= Guido Palau =

British hairdresser

Guido Palau, (commonly referred to by his first name only) is a British hair stylist.

== Early life ==
Guido Palau was born in Dorset, the fourth of four boys and spent his teenage years in Bournemouth. After a mediocre school career he went travelling and on his return trained as a hairdresser, initially with Vidal Sassoon which had a salon in Bournemouth.

"One day I filled the appointment sheet with famous names, like Barbra Streisand," says Palau in a 1994 Vogue article. "Just for fun. I got found out and was sacked. They told me I'd never make it as a hairdresser." This setback caused him to re-evaluate his career, and take his occupation more seriously. After working in numerous hair salons, he decided that his passion was session hair styling for photographic shoots and fashion shows.

== Career ==
An early turning point in Guido's career was when he styled George Michael's Freedom! '90 music video, which featured supermodels, including Naomi Campbell, Linda Evangelista, Christy Turlington, Tatjana Patitz, and Cindy Crawford.

In the early '90s, just as the supermodel era was ending and the grunge moment was about to take hold, Guido began working with photographer David Sims, who had been taking documentary style photos of street-cast subjects. Once these images started appearing in the pages of The Face, they grabbed the attention of designer Calvin Klein, who drafted Guido and Sims to transfer the ratty, anti-fashion hairstyles of London's plaid-shirt-wearing malcontents to the heads of James King and Kate Moss. He was then asked by Calvin Klein to work on the designer's pivotal fall 1994 fashion show. Klein's endorsement brought global attention, and more high-end work followed, such as working on the Versace campaign in 1996 with Richard Avedon.

Guido, along with his close friend makeup artist Diane Kendal, are considered major forces behind the grunge movement of the mid '90s, which is a look defined by its bare skin, smudged eyes, and bed-head locks.

Today, Guido is described by British Vogue as "The World's most in-demand hair stylist." He regularly collaborates with fashion photographer Steven Meisel and continues to work closely with David Sims. His work is featured regularly in Italian, French, British and American Vogue, Love, V, and W Magazine. Each season, he creates the hair look for more than 30 fashion shows, and according to a 2010 Allure article, has become one of the busiest runway stylists in the business – and the driving force behind many of the major trends. His styles are seen on the runways of fashion houses, including Prada, Balenciaga, Marc Jacobs, Lanvin, Alexander Wang, Calvin Klein, Versace, Louis Vuitton, Yves Saint Laurent, Ralph Lauren and Alexander McQueen.

His first book, Heads: Hair by Guido, was published in 2000 and features a decade of his signature work.

In 2014, he released Hair: Guido, presenting 70 avant-gardist looks conceived by its author and shot by the photographer David Sims

In 2005, Guido was signed with Redken as their creative consultant.

In December 2009, Guido was included on the British Fashion Council's list of 25 Most Powerful People in the Fashion Industry – a list that also included Alexander McQueen, Nick Knight, John Galliano, Kate Moss, and Naomi Campbell.
