= It's Only a Game (collection) =

2005 fashion collection by Alexander McQueen

Gemma Ward wearing Look 28 on the runway, a dress with puffball skirt and Japonisme headdress

It's Only a Game is the twenty-fifth collection by British designer Alexander McQueen, released for the Spring/Summer 2005 season of his eponymous fashion house. It was inspired by the youthful Edwardian-era clothing in the Australian Gothic film Picnic at Hanging Rock (1975) as well as McQueen's ideas about a clash of Eastern and Western fashion cultures. The collection saw McQueen updating historical silhouettes with modern touches like short skirts, as well as revisiting and reworking ideas from his previous season. Japanese influences were clear from the use of kimono-inspired silhouettes and cultural motifs like koi, while Western sportswear appeared in motocross jumpsuits and American football-inspired armour.

The runway show was staged on 8 October 2004 at the Palais Omnisports de Paris-Bercy in Paris. Thirty-six outfits were presented, grouped in thematic sets such as blonde women wearing outfits based on school uniforms. With a finale inspired by the giant chess scene from the first Harry Potter film, It's Only a Game marked a return to showmanship when compared to McQueen's previous show. The models remained on stage during the catwalk portion instead of exiting as normal. Once all thirty-six outfits had been presented, the stage lit up like a chessboard and the models, dressed to represent major chess pieces, played out a game representing the culture clash central to the collection's narrative.

Critical response to the clothing and runway show for It's Only a Game was positive, and it is well-remembered in retrospect. Critics were pleased with the return to showmanship, although there was some criticism of the reliance on reworking old ideas. Academic analysis has largely focused on the collection's influences and referentiality. Items from It's Only a Game have appeared in museum exhibits such as Alexander McQueen: Savage Beauty.

== Background ==
British fashion designer Alexander McQueen was known for his imaginative, sometimes controversial designs. Over the course of his career, which lasted from 1992 until his death in 2010, he explored a broad range of ideas and themes, particularly sexuality, death, violence, romanticism, and historicism. He began as an apprentice on Savile Row, earning a reputation as an expert tailor; later he learned dressmaking as head designer for French fashion house Givenchy. (Note: From October 1996 to October 2001, McQueen was simultaneously head designer at Givenchy and at his own label.) Although he worked in ready-to-wear – clothing produced for retail sale – his showpieces featured a degree of craftsmanship that verged on haute couture – extremely high-end custom designs with elaborate handiwork.

McQueen's personal fixations had a strong influence on his designs. He often used visual and thematic contrasts for effect. His collections were historicist, in that he adapted historical designs and narratives, and self-referential, in that he revisited and reworked ideas between collections. As a cinephile, he often referred to his favourite films in his work, especially the historical clothing in Gothic fiction and period films. He was fascinated with Japanese culture and had drawn on Japanese clothing in multiple collections, including Voss (Spring/Summer 2001) and Scanners (Autumn/Winter 2003). His fashion shows were often elaborate to the point of being performance art, and audiences began to expect him to present dramatic spectacles. His previous collection, Pantheon ad Lucem (Autumn/Winter 2004), had been criticised as dull and disappointing for lacking such theatre.

Variations on a hard moulded bodice appeared in a number of McQueen's collections, beginning with Banshee (Autumn/Winter 1994). For No. 13 (Spring/Summer 1999), McQueen commissioned plaster of Paris life casts of model Laura Morgan, which were used to create leather bodices. The casts were re-used to make similar items for future collections, including The Overlook (Autumn/Winter 1999) and In Memory of Elizabeth Howe, Salem, 1692 (Autumn/Winter 2008).

== Concept and creative process ==
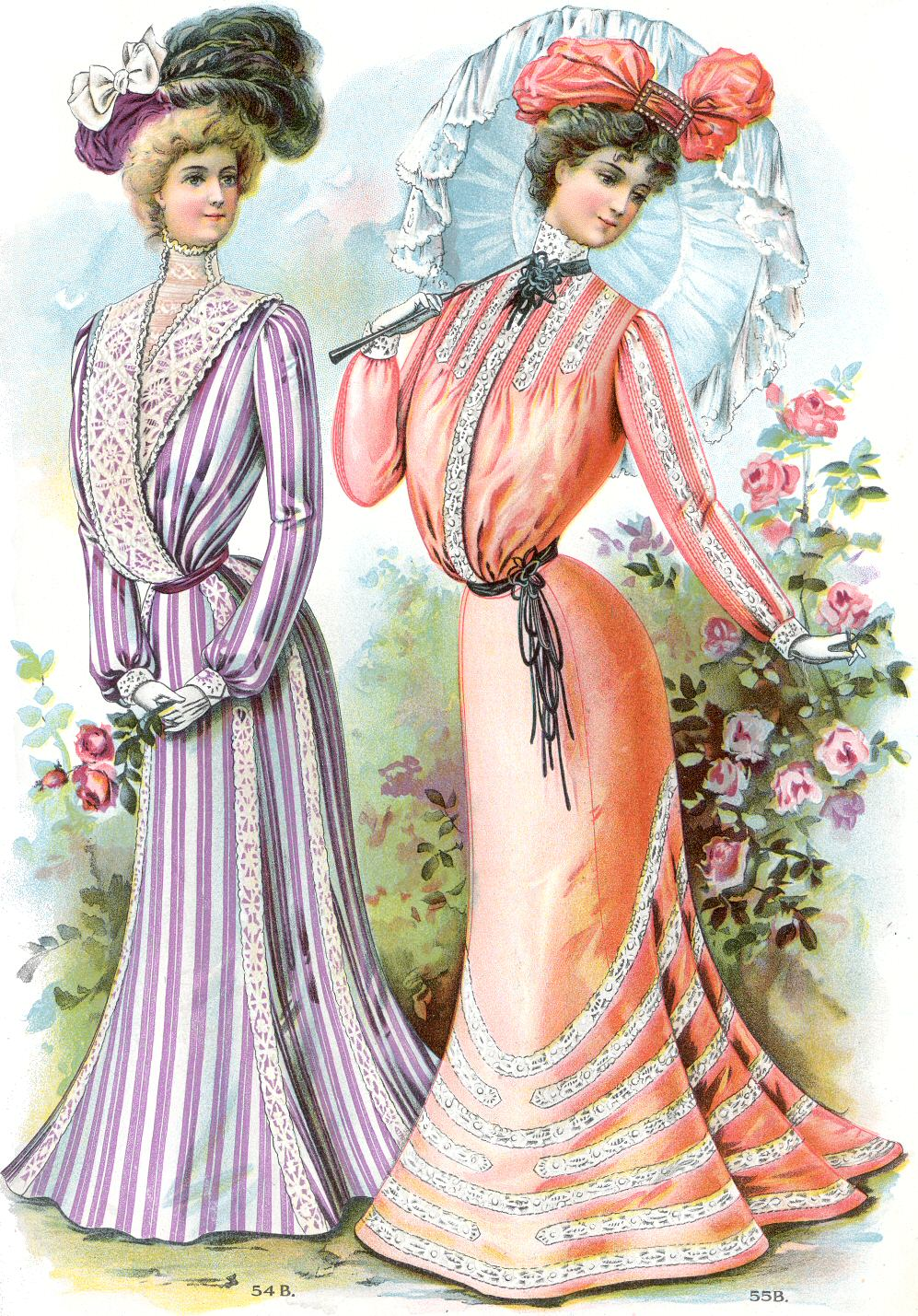
Sketches of Edwardian-era fashion from The Delineator, 1901

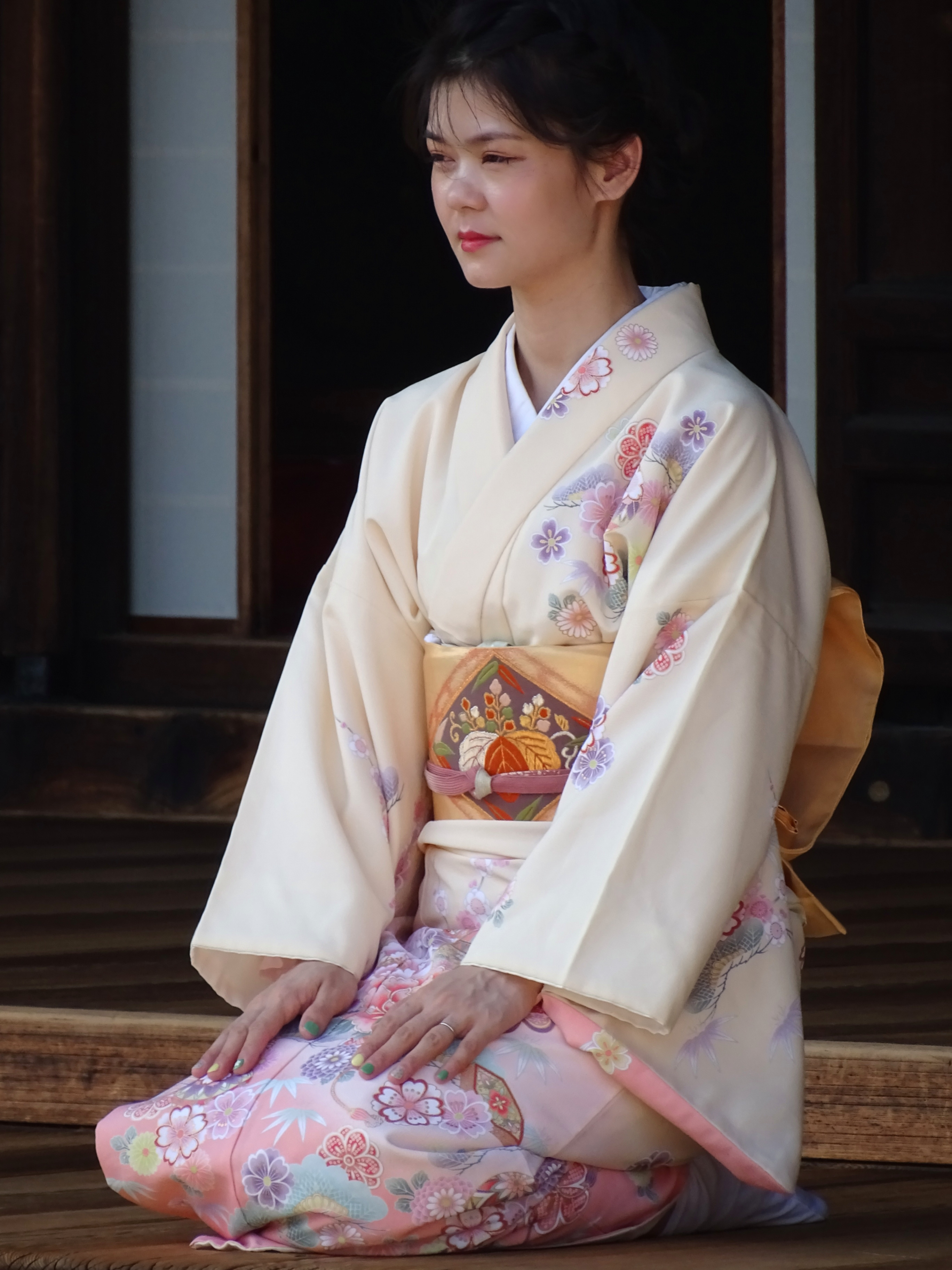
Young Japanese woman wearing kimono with obi belt

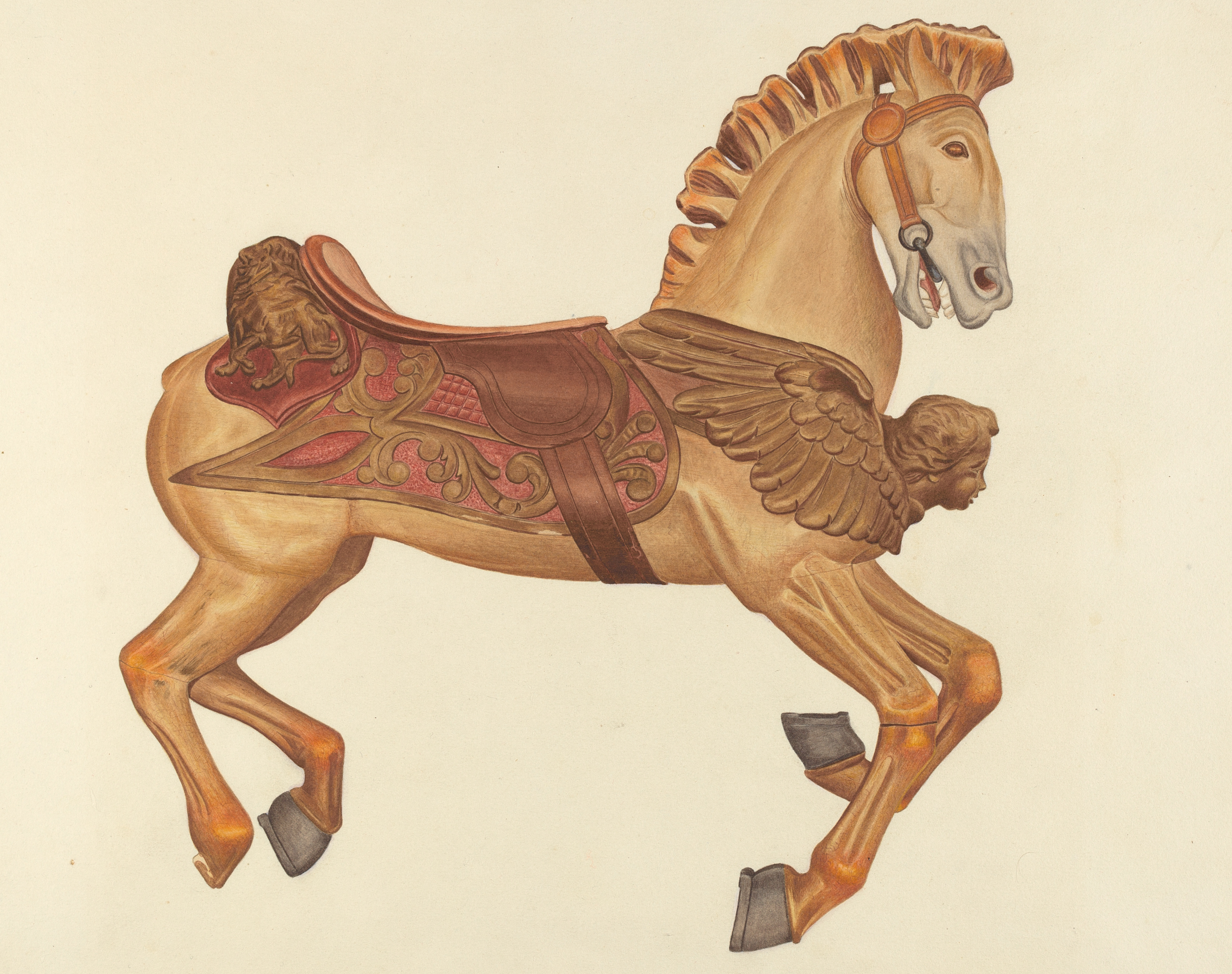
Carousel horse

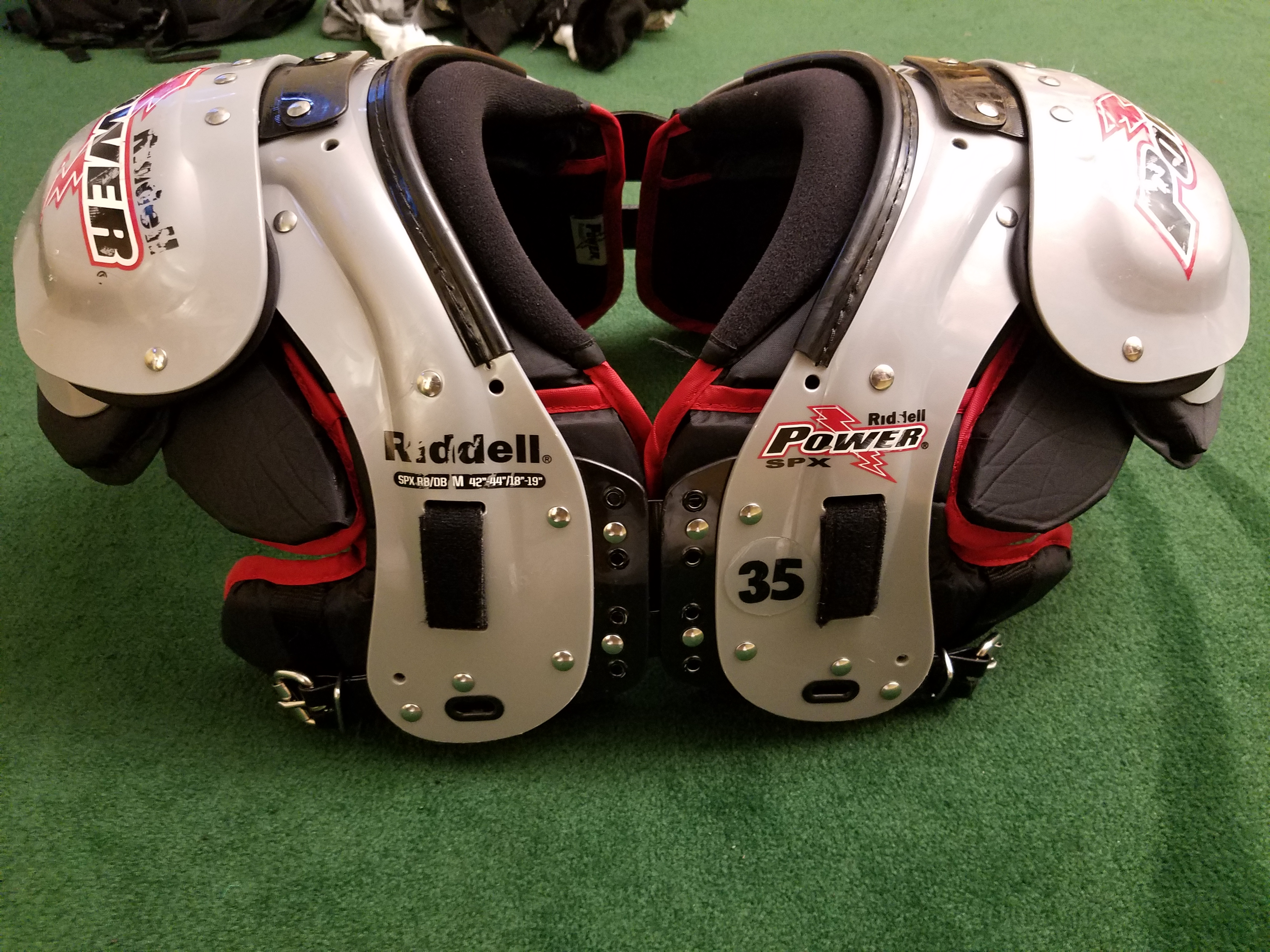
Shoulder pads for American football

It's Only a Game (Spring/Summer 2005) is the twenty-fifth collection McQueen designed for his eponymous fashion house. The collection is presented as a contrast of fashion cultures, juxtaposing Western fashion with Eastern fashion. Although drawing on a range of influences, the overall look was strongly influenced by the Edwardian-era clothing in the Australian Gothic film Picnic at Hanging Rock (1975), which concerns the mysterious disappearance of a group of schoolgirls. The palette mostly comprised soft Edwardian-style colours: violet, lilac, primrose pink, dusky rose, and a pale green known as "eau de nil". The collection was softer and more romantically feminine than his usual offerings, although his signature sharp tailoring was present as well.

McQueen incorporated Edwardian elements throughout the collection, including lace; high, fitted collars; an hourglass silhouette; sharp vertical pintucks and pleats; and smocking. Heavy fabrics like brocade provided structure. Grosgrain, a type of fabric that would normally be used inside boned bodices, was used on the exterior of garments in ribbon-size widths as a waist closure. Fabric inserts called godets were used to add volume to some skirts. McQueen also referenced eighteenth century fashion with tight bodices, chiffon empire-line dresses in floral prints, and wide-hipped skirts that echoed the broad silhouette created by panniers in that era.

Compared to the previous season's Pantheon ad Lucem, which had a mature silhouette exemplified by sleek floor-length column gowns, the designs in It's Only a Game were more youthful, including babydoll dresses and shorter skirts that had flouncy or puffy silhouettes. Many designs drew directly from formal historical children's wear, rendered in adult proportions. One set of designs drew on school uniforms and sailor suits, influenced by McQueen's background in men's tailoring. These outfits, which had a mostly grey palette, included variations on fitted blazers, white blouses, and either short skirts or calf-length trousers for bottoms. Twisted candy-cane stripes and carousel prints or embroidery were a common decorative flourish.

Cultural clash was the other major influence on the collection, represented in the show's finale by a chess game of opposites. As with Voss, there were heavy references to Japanese culture and clothing. Many designs included wide collars or sashes reminiscent of the Japanese kimono and its associated belt, the obi. Embroidery and graphics on many items were made to look like colourful Japanese tattoos or incorporated traditional motifs like koi fish. To a lesser extent, the use of silk and the appearance of dresses modelled on robes also signalled Japanese influence. Some items had prints or patterns apparently inspired by the work of Orientalist painter and costumer Léon Bakst.

On the other hand, contemporary American influence was shown through sportswear, particularly in outfits based on American football equipment, complete with helmets and shoulder pads. Fantastical elements like spikes on the helmets gave these items the appearance of a warrior's armor from dystopian fiction. There were also motocross jumpsuits with a large "Q" on the chest. As he often did, McQueen revised previous ideas for It's Only a Game. A criss-cross bodice style from Pantheon ad Lucem that had been popular commercially was brought back for Looks 16 and 34, and carousel motifs on some of the later looks recalled the circus theme of What a Merry-Go-Round (Autumn/Winter 2001).

=== Notable items ===
Morgan's body casts were re-used to create four moulded leather bodices or "cuirasses", representing knights. Looks 25 and 30 were in pastel shades with horsehair skirts and ponytails, as well as metal bars across the mouth. Looks 31 and 36 had brown leather uppers with high horsehair ponytails, worn over colourful bell-shaped skirts. Prosthetics expert Steve Powell was commissioned to craft these, with the horsehair provided by the company that supplies Royal Horse Guards. These items referred to previous collections in a number of ways. The brown bodices visually recalled the original brown leather corsets from No. 13. Some authors have described the knight ensembles as reminiscent of medical devices like body casts, possibly in a callback to the hospital theme of Voss. The mouth bars also have visual similarities to dental braces or the face masks on football helmets.

Look 28, one of the queen ensembles for the chess game, is a lilac minidress with puffball skirt. It incorporates Japanese elements, with its wide kimono-esque collar and floral Japonisme embellishments on the sleeves and bodice, while its wide-hipped skirt references eighteenth-century silhouettes. Laura Dimitrio considered the dress an "eccentric" re-interpretation of the kimono, with its unusual skirt and obi-esque sash at chest height. It was paired on the runway with a Japonisme headpiece by Philip Treacy, sometimes referred to as the "Chinese Garden" headpiece. It is an assemblage of cork shadowboxes of Japanese landscapes which Treacy purchased from Japan, disassembled, and rearranged into one piece.

== Runway show ==
=== Production details ===
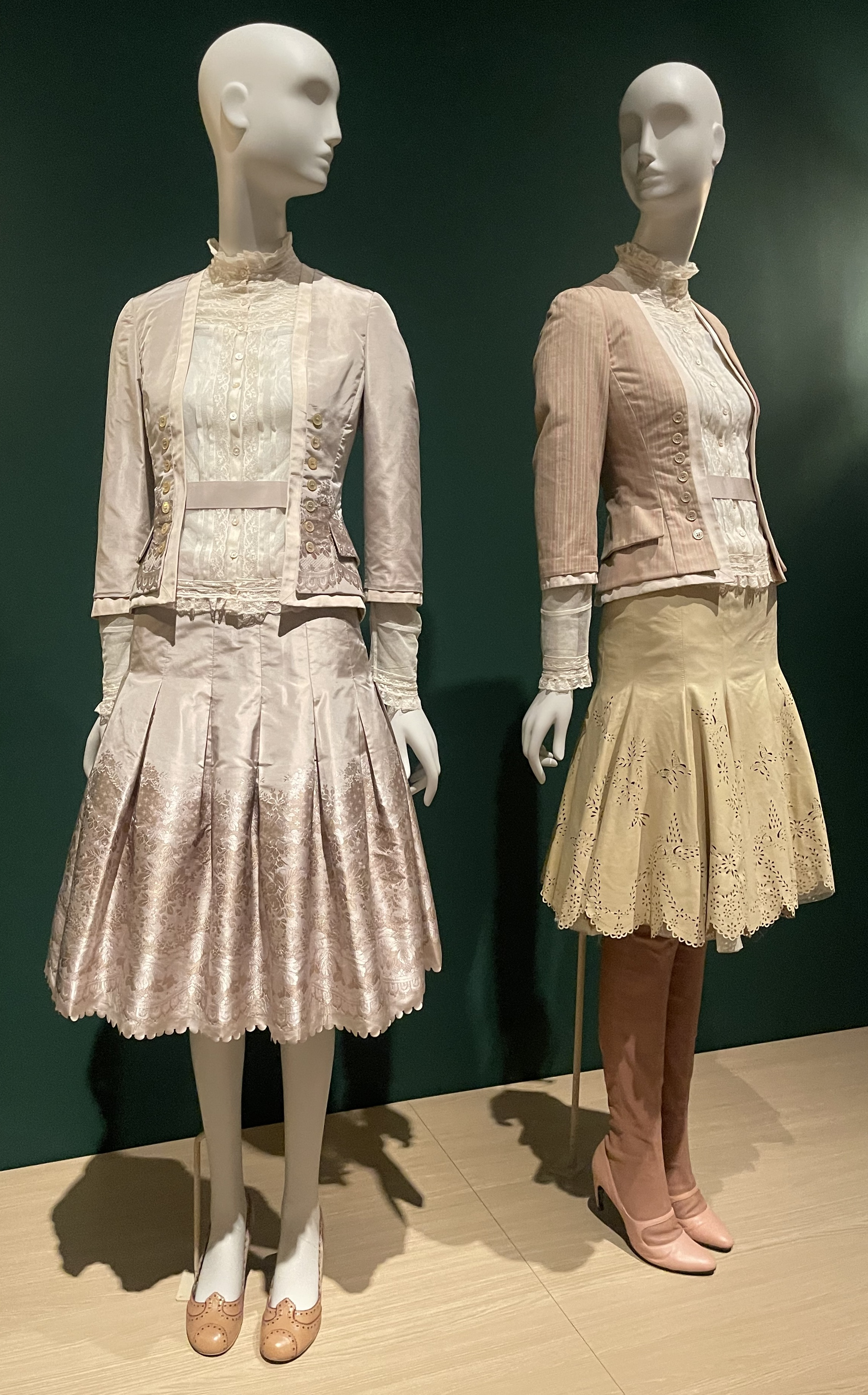
Ensembles from It's Only a Game. Boots on right mannequin are from Pantheon ad Lucem (Autumn/Winter 2004). Presented at Lee Alexander McQueen: Mind, Mythos, Muse (2022).

The runway show was staged on 8 October 2004 at the Palais Omnisports de Paris-Bercy in Paris; it was the first of six shows McQueen presented there. (Note: The others were The Widows of Culloden (Autumn/Winter 2006), La Dame Bleue (Spring/Summer 2008), The Girl Who Lived in the Tree (Autumn/Winter 2008), The Horn of Plenty (Autumn/Winter 2009), and Plato's Atlantis (Spring/Summer 2010).) The invitation was a playing card with a joker on the face side and the show details on the back.

McQueen typically worked with a consistent creative team for his shows. His longtime collaborator Katy England was responsible for overall styling, assisted by Tabitha Simmons. Gainsbury & Whiting oversaw production. Joseph Bennett took care of set design. Eugene Souleiman styled hair, while Val Garland and Terry Barber handled make-up on behalf of MAC Cosmetics. Styling was kept simple, with minimal make-up and hair in backcombed, messy up-dos.

The chess game finale was choreographed by dancer Les Child. It was inspired by the giant chess scene from the 2001 film Harry Potter and the Philosopher's Stone, as well as the performance art of Vanessa Beecroft, whose work features young women standing in formation. McQueen wanted the models and their outfits to be visually contrasting. As Child recalled, for example, this meant "a redhead opposite an Asian model, a look inspired by sportswear opposite a geisha queen." The show's chessboard was condensed to thirty-six squares compared to the usual sixty-four, but all squares were filled when the game started rather than the centre being left unoccupied.

Twenty models represented major chess pieces. The two women in the football-inspired ensembles were the kings. (Note: Watt also interprets the models in football gear to be knights, but the runway show ends with one of these "pieces" in "checkmate".) The queens wore short puffball-skirted dresses and elaborate headpieces: one a Chinese garden, one an exaggeratedly pointed crown. The castles on one side wore motocross jumpsuits with "Q" on chest, and yellow dresses on the other side. Bishops wore tall column dresses on one side and robes with kimono collars on the other. Finally, knights wore moulded bodices with horsehair ponytails; soft pink and lavender with horsehair skirts for one side, brown leather with carousel-themed skirts on the other.

=== Catwalk presentation ===
The runway was a square white stage, without set dressing, with the audience seated on three sides. The opening appeared conventional, with models walking straight down the centre of the stage. Instead of exiting, they took positions in columns of six, facing forward, as others walked past them. The models walked to the songs "Relax" (1983) and "Two Tribes" (1984), both by Frankie Goes to Hollywood.

The first column comprised blonde women wearing variations on a schoolgirl uniform, followed by a group of Asian models wearing outfits in neutral tones with colorful prints and embroidery. The next set was red-haired Caucasian models wearing outfits in white and pale green, then Latina models in yellow and white dresses. The fifth group wore outfits in lavender and grey, including two of the moulded bodices with horsehair skirts, and a football-inspired ensemble worn by Ajuma Nasenyana. The final group were dressed in shades of brown and pink, including two moulded corsets in brown with carousel skirts and another football outfit.

When all the models were in position, the lights went down briefly. A synthetic voice announced "Now we start the game", and the stage lit up with a chessboard pattern. An overture from Harry Potter and the Philosopher's Stone began to play. The models turned to face one another, mimicking the opposing sides of a chessboard, and a robotic voice directed them to move along the spaces as if they were playing chess. The inner two rows – schoolgirls and taupe outfits – played each other off and exited the stage as a group. The models in the outer rows were directed to move as specific chess pieces, leaving the stage as they were captured or eliminated. Eventually, Nasenyana was "checkmated" and the game ended with her in a defeated pose under red lights. The models still in play remained onstage as the lights went down briefly. The eliminated models returned for their final turn, followed by McQueen's bow to the Elvis Presley version of "Suspicious Minds" (1969).

== Reception ==
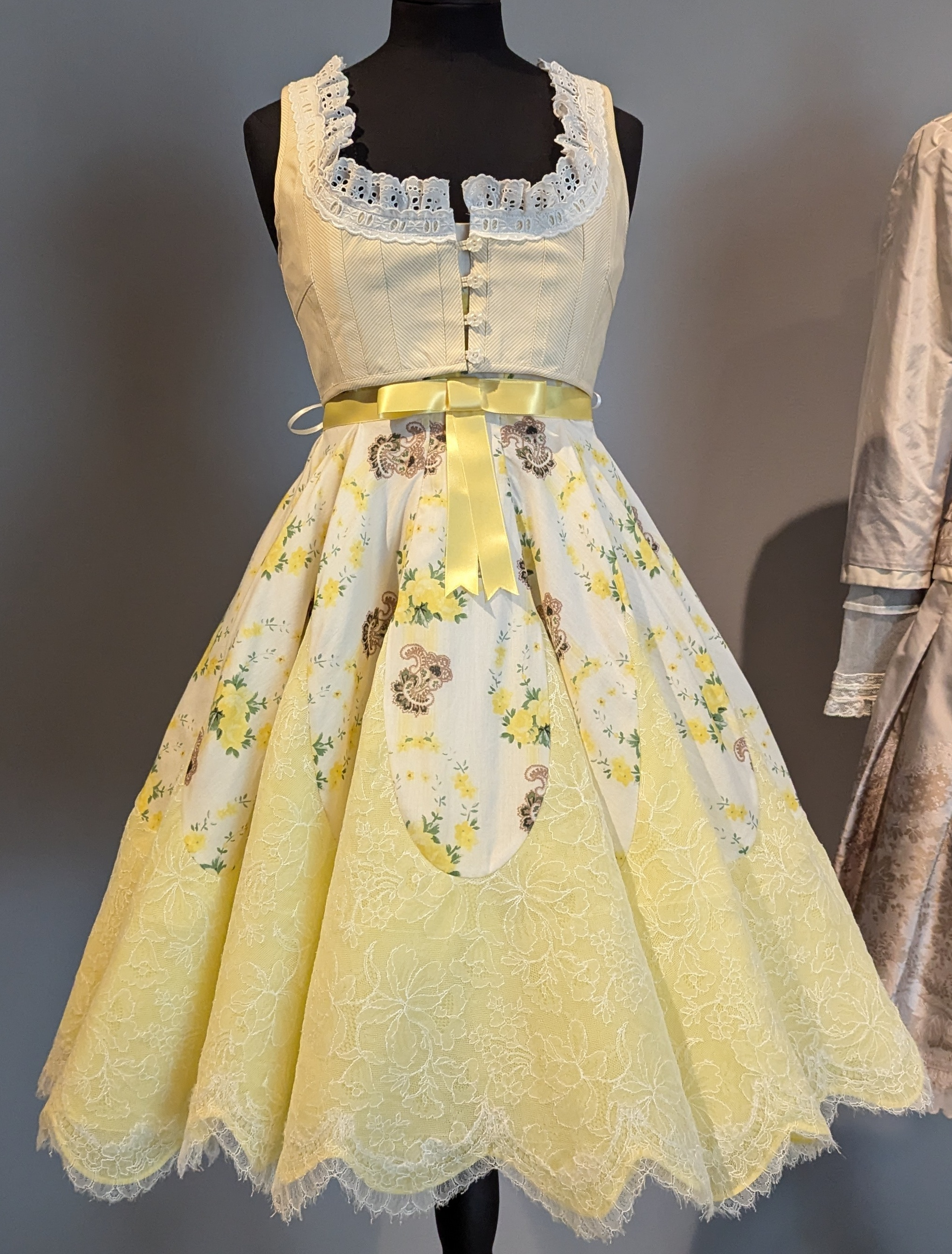
Look 24 at Lee Alexander McQueen & Ann Ray: Rendez-Vous

It's Only a Game was generally well-received, although it attracted some criticism for relying on McQueen's standard concepts rather than innovating. Jess Cartner-Morley of The Guardian noted that the collection was "McQueen in a nutshell", with darkly sensual undertones beneath historical references. She considered the collection part of a trend for "mademoiselle chic", which she described as being focused on "glamourised little girliness". In her review forVogue, Sarah Mower felt that the collection did not show McQueen advancing his designs. However, she thought the revisited concepts were "even better second time around" and concluded it was a positive development. Cathy Horyn of The New York Times was pleased with the designs, especially the chiffon horse gown, but suggested that McQueen needed to "strive for" discipline in his work "to become a full success".

Booth Moore of the Los Angeles Times described it as a "retrospective of sorts" and took the theme and title as a joking comment on the fashion industry. Mower also believed the chess theme was a swipe at the industry. The Toronto Star quoted Jane Hsiang of Elle saying the show was beautiful to look at without over-intellectualising fashion, which she felt was something to avoid.

The chiffon dress with stripes and carousel horses, Look 32, has been singled out as a highlight. Horyn called it "stellar" in her contemporary review, while Chloe Fox, writing in retrospect, labelled it "one of McQueen's most successful designs".

McQueen's biographers have identified the collection as a strong one, despite McQueen's ongoing personal issues and dissatisfaction with his career. In her 2015 book Gods and Kings, Dana Thomas wrote that the collection was a "biting" commentary on fashion. Karen Homer wrote that it was "one of his most iconic shows". Andrew Wilson felt the choice of closing song, whose lyrics describe a toxic relationship, gestured to McQueen's "desire to escape". In 2015, Wonderland magazine picked It's Only a Game as one of their top seven McQueen shows.

== Analysis ==
The styles and references embodied in the moulded bodices have attracted critical analysis. Sophie Lemahieu cited them as an example of how McQueen's silhouettes were Neo-Romantic, in that he adapted historical styles rather than simply emulating them. The collection's bodices were extended upward to the chin or over the head, which played on, and extended, the physical restriction necessitated by the typical corset. Kristen Knox felt the pairing of the carousel skirts with rigid corsets gave the look "a sense of physical constraint, again realizing McQueen's central tension of the darkness of the child within". She and Brooke Hodge, writing separately, compared these items to Look 12 from Scanners, a dress whose overlapping brocade panels resembled samurai armor. Hodge felt that both styles played on "contradictions" of hard and soft. Knox suggested the horsehair skirts and topknots may have been a reference to the horsehair plumes used to decorate Mongolian armour. Ariane Fennetaux discussed the horsehair bodices as examples of how McQueen created looks that hybridised animals with human shapes and non-organic materials. The models wearing these items resembled centaurs and Amazon warriors simultaneously: armoured in leather, but bearing horse tack as well.

Others have commented on the collection's influences. Anna Jackson argued that McQueen's incorporation of elements from Japanese clothing was more "transformative" than similar efforts by other designers, who treated these aesthetics as a novelty, writing "This is not kimono as exotic costume but as creative translation". Claire Wilcox thought McQueen made use of the kimono in this and other collections because it could easily be made modern while being grounded in a tradition of "exquisite material and craftsmanship". Jane Pritchard argued that the visual resemblance to Bakst's prints indicated the influence of dance costume on McQueen's work.

The chess finale, and its grouping of women, is a third theme of analysis. Fashion journalist Alex Fury argued that It's Only a Game was an example of McQueen expressing his vision "through the bodies of his models" rather than through elaborate set dressing. The show's sole ornament is the illuminated chessboard; in all other aspects, the performance is entirely reliant on the models: "their assemblage, their movements, and their clothing". Ingrid Loschek felt the collection's groupings represented a number of archetypal women, "supposedly weak or strong". She thought McQueen was deconstructing traditional notions of eroticism in presenting these archetypes as transformed chess pieces.

== Legacy ==
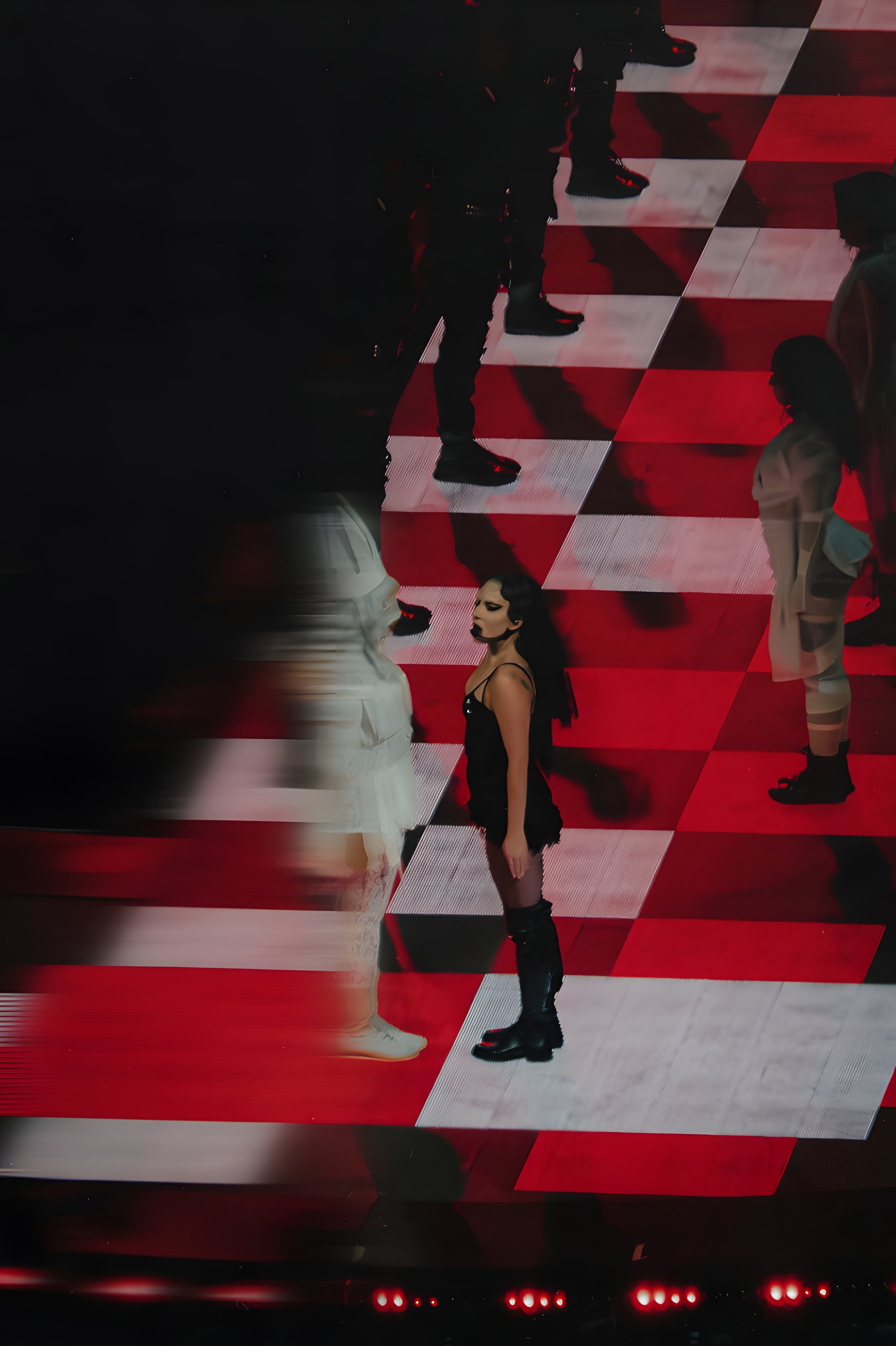
Lady Gaga performing "Poker Face" at The Mayhem Ball in London, 2025; the chess elements of the backdrop and choreography were a reference to It's Only a Game

By the mid-2000s, McQueen had reached a stage of exhaustion with his career and the fashion industry, at one point saying, "I go in, I do my business, do the parties, and leave." Although It's Only a Game was a success, McQueen's late-career malaise deepened rather than improved over the next two seasons. His following two collections – The Man Who Knew Too Much (Autumn/Winter 2005) and Neptune (Spring/Summer 2006) – were poorly received and in retrospect are largely dismissed as commercial and forgettable. After McQueen's suicide in 2010, his right-hand woman, Sarah Burton, took over the label, where she continued to draw inspiration from the kimono as McQueen had.

Several looks from It's Only a Game were photographed for Vogue, including an editorial by Paul Demarchelier featuring four looks, and an editorial featuring one of the chiffon carousel dresses, by Tim Walker. Gemma Ward wore Look 35, one of these dresses, to the 2006 Met Gala, the theme of which was AngloMania.

Looks 26 to 28 from the runway appeared in the retrospective exhibit Alexander McQueen: Savage Beauty at the Metropolitan Museum of Art (the Met): the lilac horsehair cuirass, the long gown with lilac jacket, the lilac football outfit, and the puffball kimono-collar dress. The Met owns the "Chinese Garden" headpiece from Look 28. The Los Angeles County Museum of Art owns two jacket-and-skirt ensembles and a pair of shoes from the collection, which appeared in the museum's 2022 exhibition Lee Alexander McQueen: Mind, Mythos, Muse.

Fashion collector Jennifer Zuiker auctioned her McQueen collection in 2020, including one piece from It's Only a Game. A white and yellow cocktail dress sold for a reported $1,875.

For her Coachella 2025 performance and Mayhem Ball concert tour, Lady Gaga referenced the chess game from It's Only a Game in her performance of "Poker Face". The segment featured opposing groups of backup dancers on an illuminated chessboard as Gaga did battle with her doppelganger. Livia Caligor of W magazine wrote that while McQueen was framing "fashion as psychological warfare", Gaga was presenting her past "as an opponent" to be overcome.

== Bibliography ==
- Alexander McQueen | Women's Spring/Summer 2005 | Runway Show. Alexander McQueen. 15 March 2012 – via YouTube.
- Bolton, Andrew (2011). Alexander McQueen: Savage Beauty. New York City: Metropolitan Museum of Art. ISBN 978-1-58839-412-5. OCLC 687693871.
  - Frankel, Susannah. Introduction. In Bolton (2011), pp. 17–27.
- Bowles, Hamish (2014). Vogue & the Metropolitan Museum of Art Costume Institute: Parties, Exhibitions, People (1st ed.). New York: Condé Nast. ISBN 978-1-4197-1424-5. OCLC 871511830.
- Dimitrio, Laura (2024). "Japonisme, New Japonisme, and Pop Japonisme in Italian Fashion". Journal of Japonisme. 9 (2). Brill Publishers: 80–114. doi:10.1163/24054992-09020002. ISSN 2405-4984.
- Esguerra, Clarissa M.; Hansen, Michaela (2022). Lee Alexander McQueen: Mind, Mythos, Muse. New York City: Delmonico Books. ISBN 978-1-63681-018-8. OCLC 1289986708.
- Fairer, Robert; Wilcox, Claire (2016). Alexander McQueen: Unseen. New Haven, Connecticut: Yale University Press. ISBN 978-0-300-22267-8. OCLC 946216643.
- Fennetaux, Ariane (Autumn 2018). "Birds of a Feather: Alexander McQueen's Victorian Bestiary". Cahiers victoriens et édouardiens (in French) (88). doi:10.4000/cve.4328. ISSN 0220-5610.
- Fox, Chloe (2012). Vogue On: Alexander McQueen. Vogue on Designers. London: Quadrille Publishing. ISBN 978-1849491136. OCLC 828766756.
- Gleason, Katherine (2012). Alexander McQueen: Evolution. New York City: Race Point Publishing. ISBN 978-1-61058-837-9. OCLC 783147416.
- Gorelik, Michael (1979). "Oriental Armour of the Near and Middle East from the Eighth to the Fifteenth Centuries as Shown in Works of Art". In Elgood, Robert (ed.). Islamic Arms and Armour. University of Michigan. pp. 30–63. ISBN 978-0-85967-470-6.
- Hodge, Brooke (2006). Skin and Bones: Parallel Practices in Fashion and Architecture. Museum of Contemporary Art, Los Angeles. ISBN 978-0-914357-96-4.
- Homer, Karen (2023). Little Book of Alexander McQueen: The Story of the Iconic Brand. London: Welbeck Publishing Group. ISBN 978-1-80279-270-6.
- Knox, Kristin (2010). Alexander McQueen: Genius of a Generation. London: A&C Black. ISBN 978-1-4081-3223-4. OCLC 794296806.
- Lemahieu, Sophie (2015). "Corsets, Crinolines, and Bustles in Today's Fashions: Drawing Creative Inspiration from the History of Undergarments". In Bruna, Denis (ed.). Fashioning the Body: An Intimate History of the Silhouette. Yale University: Yale University Press. pp. 243–258. ISBN 978-0-300-20427-8.
- Loschek, Ingrid (2009). When Clothes Become Fashion: Design and Innovation Systems. Oxford: Berg Publishers. doi:10.2752/9781847883681. ISBN 978-0-85785-144-4.
- Mora, Juliana Luna; Berry, Jess (2 September 2022). "Creative Direction Succession in Luxury Fashion: The Illusion of Immortality at Chanel and Alexander McQueen". Luxury. 9 (2–3): 117–140. doi:10.1080/20511817.2022.2194039. ISSN 2051-1817.
- Thomas, Dana (2015). Gods and Kings: The Rise and Fall of Alexander McQueen and John Galliano. New York City: Penguin Publishing. ISBN 978-1-101-61795-3. OCLC 951153602.
- Watt, Judith (2012). Alexander McQueen: The Life and the Legacy. New York City: Harper Design. ISBN 978-1-84796-085-6. OCLC 892706946.
- Webb, Iain R. (2022). The Fashion Show: The Stories, Invites and Art of 300 Landmark Shows (2nd ed.). London: Welbeck. ISBN 978-1-80279-432-8.
- Wilcox, Claire, ed. (2015). Alexander McQueen. New York City: Abrams Books. ISBN 978-1-4197-1723-9. OCLC 891618596.
  - Bethune, Kate. "Encyclopedia of Collections". In Wilcox (2015), pp. 303–326.
  - Evans, Caroline. "Modelling McQueen: Hard Grace". In Wilcox (2015), pp. 189–201.
  - Fury, Alex. "Show, and Tell". In Wilcox (2015), pp. 220–233.
  - Jackson, Anna. "Refashioning Japan". In Wilcox (2015), pp. 116–121.
  - Pritchard, Jane. "Dance". In Wilcox (2015), pp. 252–257.
  - Spooner, Catherine. "A Gothic Mind". In Wilcox (2015), pp. 141–158.
- Wilcox, Claire (2020). "Kimono Dreams". In Jackson, Anna (ed.). Kimono: Kyoto to Catwalk. London: Victoria and Albert Museum. pp. 269–286. ISBN 9781851779925. OCLC 1109797332.
- Wilson, Andrew (2015). Alexander McQueen: Blood Beneath the Skin. New York City: Simon and Schuster. ISBN 978-1-4767-7674-3. OCLC 1310585849.
