= Pantheon ad Lucem =

2004 fashion collection by Alexander McQueen

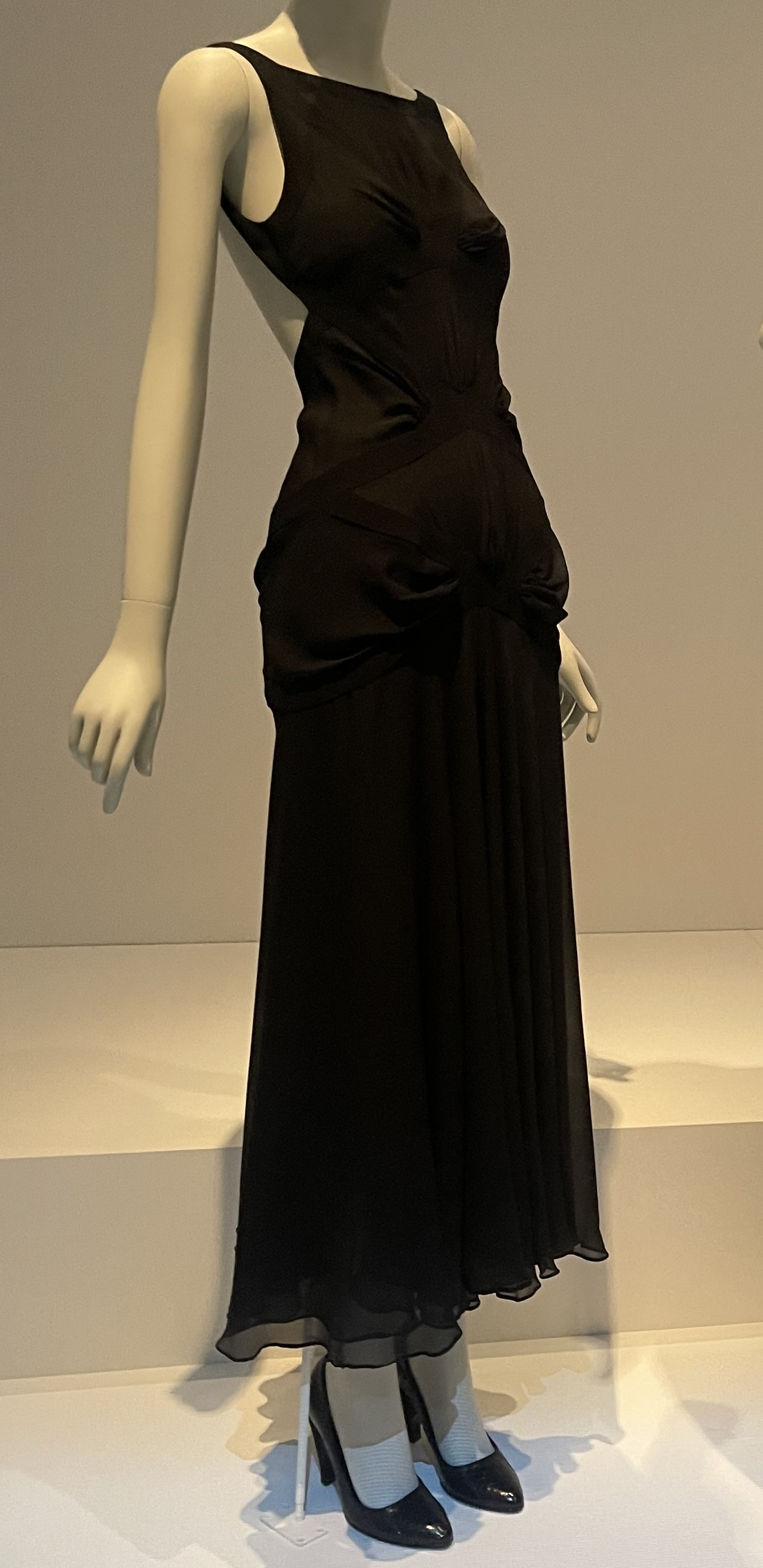
Dress from Pantheon ad Lucem presented at the exhibition Lee Alexander McQueen: Mind, Mythos, Muse (2023 staging)

Pantheon ad Lucem is the twenty-fourth collection by British designer Alexander McQueen, released for the Autumn/Winter 2004 season of his eponymous fashion house. Inspired by ideas of rebirth, ancient Greek garments, and science fiction films like 2001: A Space Odyssey (1968) and Star Wars (1977), the collection focused on sleek draped, wrapped, or tied jersey designs in light and neutral colours, with some evening wear in darker colours. Contrasting the slimline items were heavier garments including tweed suits and fur coats. McQueen expressed his fascination with altering the silhouette, emphasising the hips to a degree that was uncommon for him.

The runway show was staged on 5 March 2004 at the Grande halle de la Villette in Paris. In contrast to McQueen's usually bombastic presentations, the show for Pantheon ad Lucem was minimalist. Models were styled to look androgynous and somewhat alien. They wore wigs with short, tightly curled hair, echoing hairstyles found on ancient Greek statuary. The runway was a plain white circle, illuminated from below. Lighting abstractly evoked the Roman Colosseum or an alien starship. For the show's finale, model Tiiu Kuik wore a grey evening gown with an exaggerated hourglass silhouette, styled with a shoulder-piece decorated with silver orchids, and walked to the spotlit centre of the stage to the sound of a flatlining heart monitor.

Critical response to the clothing and the runway show for Pantheon ad Lucem was mixed to positive, and it is regarded as one of McQueen's less significant collections. Some critics appreciated the simple artistry of the clothing, but many had come to expect theatre from McQueen and were disappointed by its absence. The "Orchid" shoulder-piece appeared in the original 2011 staging of the retrospective exhibit Alexander McQueen: Savage Beauty, and a dress from the retail collection appeared at the exhibition Lee Alexander McQueen: Mind, Mythos, Muse (2022).

== Background ==
I used to use a lot of bondage allusions and hard-edged clothes. Because I was coming out as a gay man, they reflected what I felt and what I was seeing in gay clubs. It wasn't always nice. It could be very dark and ugly. When you wear one of my dresses, whether it's got elements of bondage or orchids, you're getting me, 100 percent...This fall show was about purity, about focusing on the clothes. I wanted something to counteract all the feathers and the flounces of the pirate collection [Irere] last spring.

— McQueen, reflecting on the evolution of his designs in an interview with Harper's Bazaar, August 2004

British fashion designer Alexander McQueen was known for his imaginative, sometimes controversial designs, and dramatic fashion shows which were theatrical to the point of verging on performance art. Over the course of his career, which lasted from 1992 until his death in 2010, he explored a broad range of ideas and themes, particularly sexuality, death, violence, romanticism, and historicism.

McQueen's personal fixations had a strong influence on his designs and shows. He drew on his love of film from the beginning of his career with his first commercial collection, Taxi Driver (Autumn/Winter 1993), named for the 1976 film by Martin Scorsese. He also had a lifelong fascination with space travel and aliens. Referring to the time- and space-travelling device from the science fiction show Doctor Who, he said: "If the TARDIS did exist, I'd be the first to buy one." His collections were often historicist, referencing and reworking historical narratives and concepts.

From October 1996 to October 2001, McQueen was – in addition to his responsibilities for his own fashion house – head designer at French fashion house Givenchy. In 2000, McQueen sold 51 per cent of his company to the Gucci Group, owned by French conglomerate PPR (now Kering), but retained creative control. During late 2003 and early 2004, McQueen was in tense negotiations with PPR management to replace the departing Tom Ford as creative director at Yves Saint Laurent (YSL), also owned by PPR. The discussions broke down and McQueen did not take the job, publicly stating he wished to focus on his own label.

== Concept and creative process ==
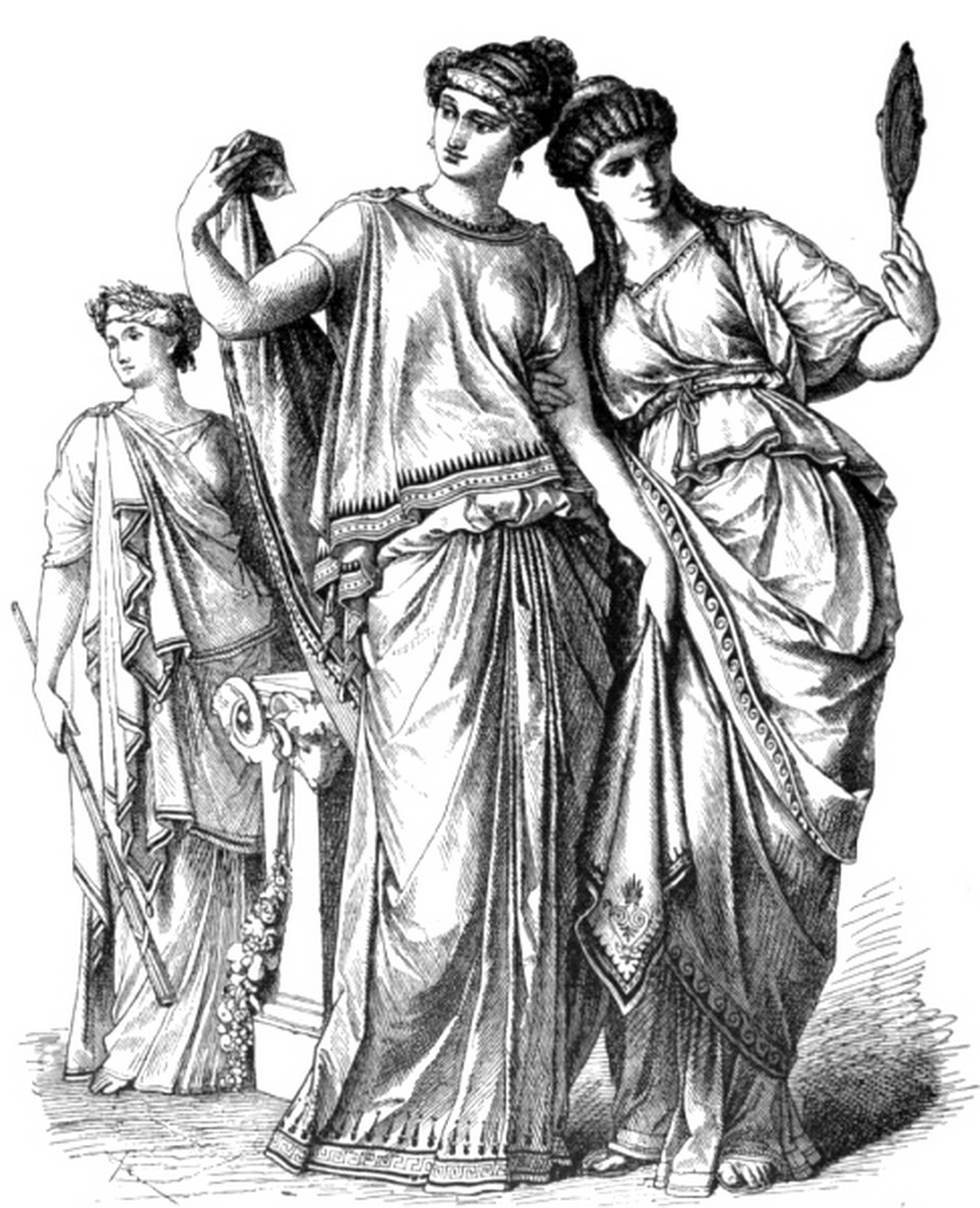
Sketch of women wearing clothing in the style of ancient Greece

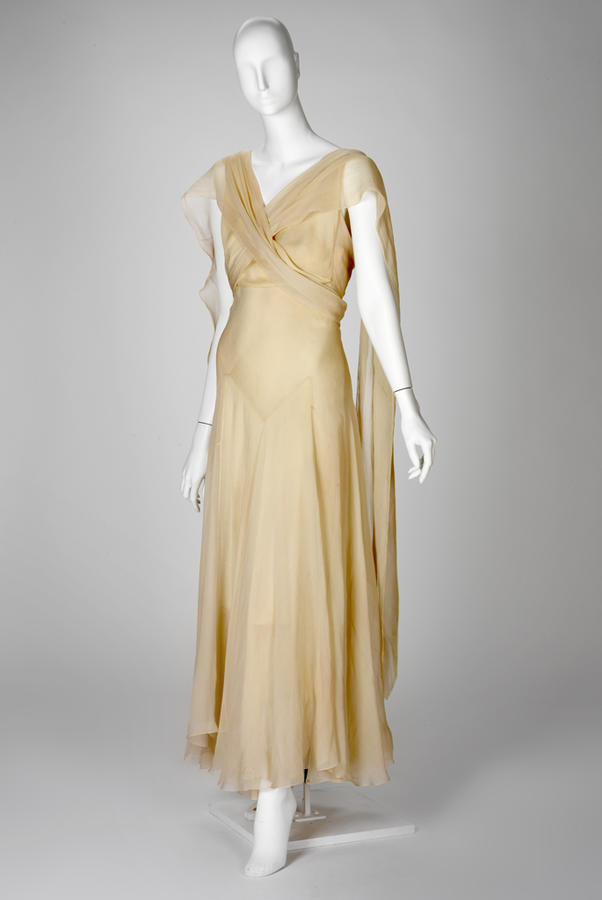
Silk chiffon evening gown by Madeleine Vionnet, c. 1932

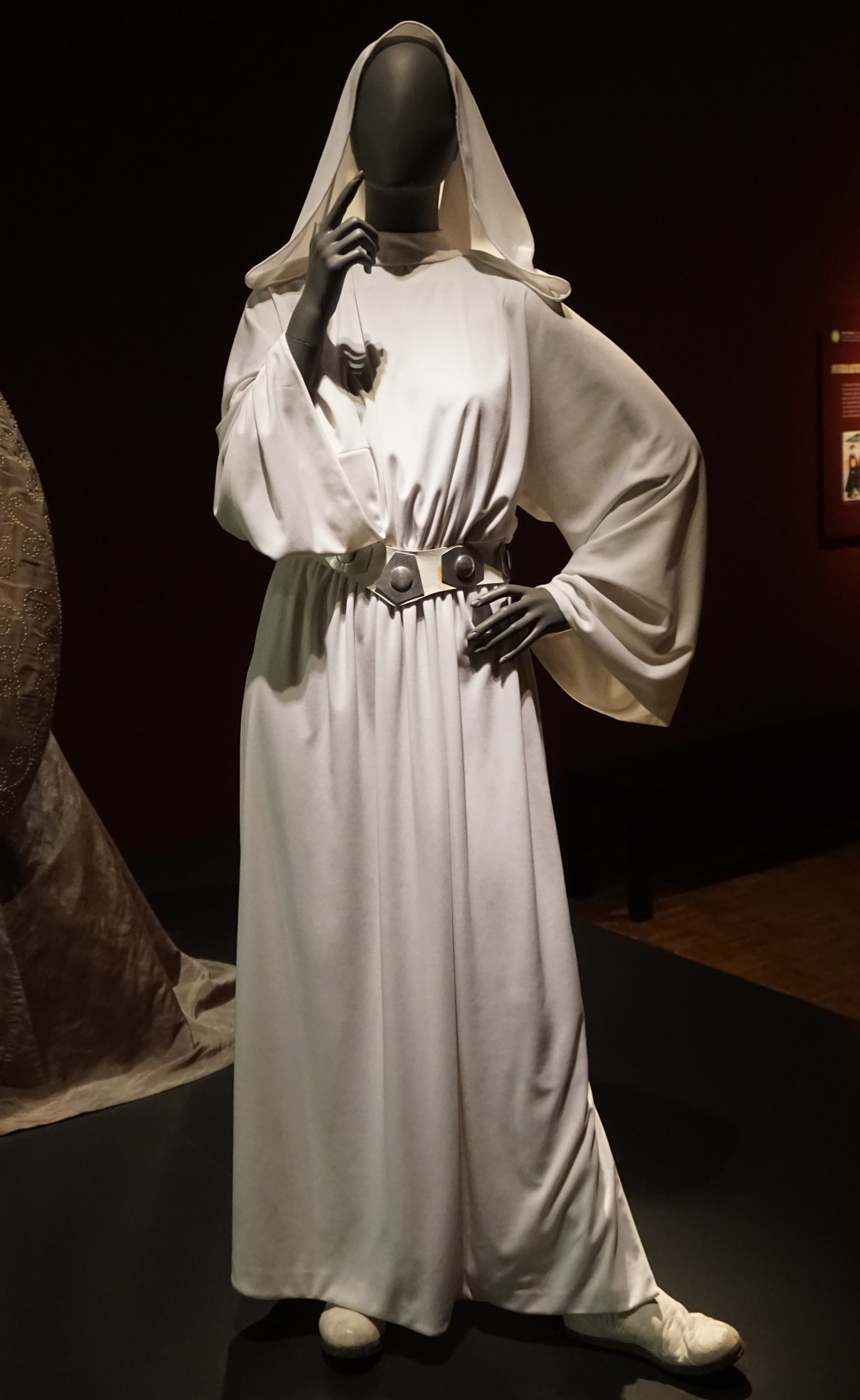
White gown worn by Princess Leia in Star Wars

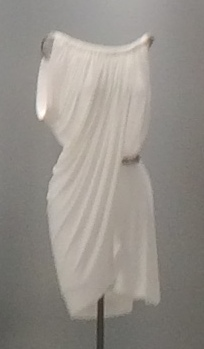
Greek-inspired draped minidress by Azzedine Alaïa

Pantheon ad Lucem (Note: Often misspelled Pantheon as Lucem, Pantheon ad Lecum, or Pantheon as Lecum) (Autumn/Winter 2004) is the twenty-fourth collection McQueen designed for his eponymous fashion house. The entire title is often incorrectly translated as meaning 'towards the light'; this is the correct translation for the Latin phrase "ad lucem", but neglects to account for the word "pantheon".

McQueen saw Pantheon ad Lucem as a rebirth and renewal. His goal for the collection was to remove "all theatrics and focus purely on design", in contrast to his usually bombastic runway presentations. He also said that he "wanted to envision what fashion should be like in the 21st century". The collection took inspiration from the loosely draped style of ancient Greek garments as well as the costume and design of science fiction films like 2001: A Space Odyssey (1968), Star Wars (1977), Close Encounters of the Third Kind (1977), and Signs (2002).

The palette was mostly neutral and the cuts were relatively simple, making heavy use of silhouettes McQueen had relied on in the past, including dresses with cinched waists, tailored suits and coats, and draped gowns. Some journalists interpreted the collection's restrained designs as being related to the YSL negotiations, either as evidence of stress, or an attempt to assert his own identity as a designer. Much of the collection comprised ensembles in draped, wrapped, or tied jersey. Long column dresses evoked the 1930s work of French designer Madeleine Vionnet, who specialised in bias-cut dresses meant to loosely drape and wrap around the body; Vionnet was also inspired by the ancient Greeks. Journalist Stephen Todd thought these items might also have been influenced by Tunisian designer Azzedine Alaïa. Contrasting the slimline items were heavier garments including tweed suits and fur coats. Looks 26 and 27 had embossed patterns that evoked the appearance of crop circles or the Nazca Lines. (Note: When referring to individual looks, this article uses the numbering from the Vogue review of the collection. Their overview is missing an orchid-printed wrap dress that appears following Look 50; look numbers mentioned in this article have not been adjusted.)

McQueen was known for playing with the silhouette by cutting or structuring garments to produce unusual shapes. In Pantheon, he emphasised the hips to a degree that was uncommon for him, but also showed cinched waists and padded jackets. The final items in the collection had highly structured boat necklines in an exaggerated width, coupled with reflective fabric or inset LED lights, giving the wearer an inhuman or alien quality. The conical silver dress in Look 51 bore a resemblance to the Apollo command module.

Despite its science fiction roots, Pantheon contained McQueen's typical references to historical clothing styles. The early phase of the collection included references to the 1930s fashion that influenced his previous collection, Deliverance (Spring/Summer 2004), including pussy bows, broadened shoulders, and slightly mismatched collars and hems. Looks 36 and 38, heavily beaded dresses with extreme cutouts, may have been referencing belly dancing outfits. McQueen referenced English medieval clothing in several of the evening wear pieces. Garments with heavily decorated yokes or long sleeves, such as those found in Looks 33 and 46 respectively, pointed back at the Plantagenet period of the Late Middle Ages. Look 47 had similarities to the English medieval kirtle. Look 54 echoed the gaping neckline in a design with elements of Tudor period clothing.

McQueen often incorporated materials and visuals from the natural world into his shows. Look 34 was styled with a large collar made from real feathers and glass beads, a possible nod to Native American styles. Jaguar print and floral print appeared in Looks 37 and 39, and 48 and 49, respectively. The exaggerated floral prints, an unusual motif for McQueen and one which he called "pivotal" to the collection's presentation, were derived from photographs of orchids by Peter Arnold. Reproducing the multicoloured photographs as prints on silk presented a technical challenge for McQueen's manufacturer and had to be redone several times. As a result, the collection was delayed and did not leave the production facility in Italy until nearly two days before the show.

== Runway show ==
=== Production details ===
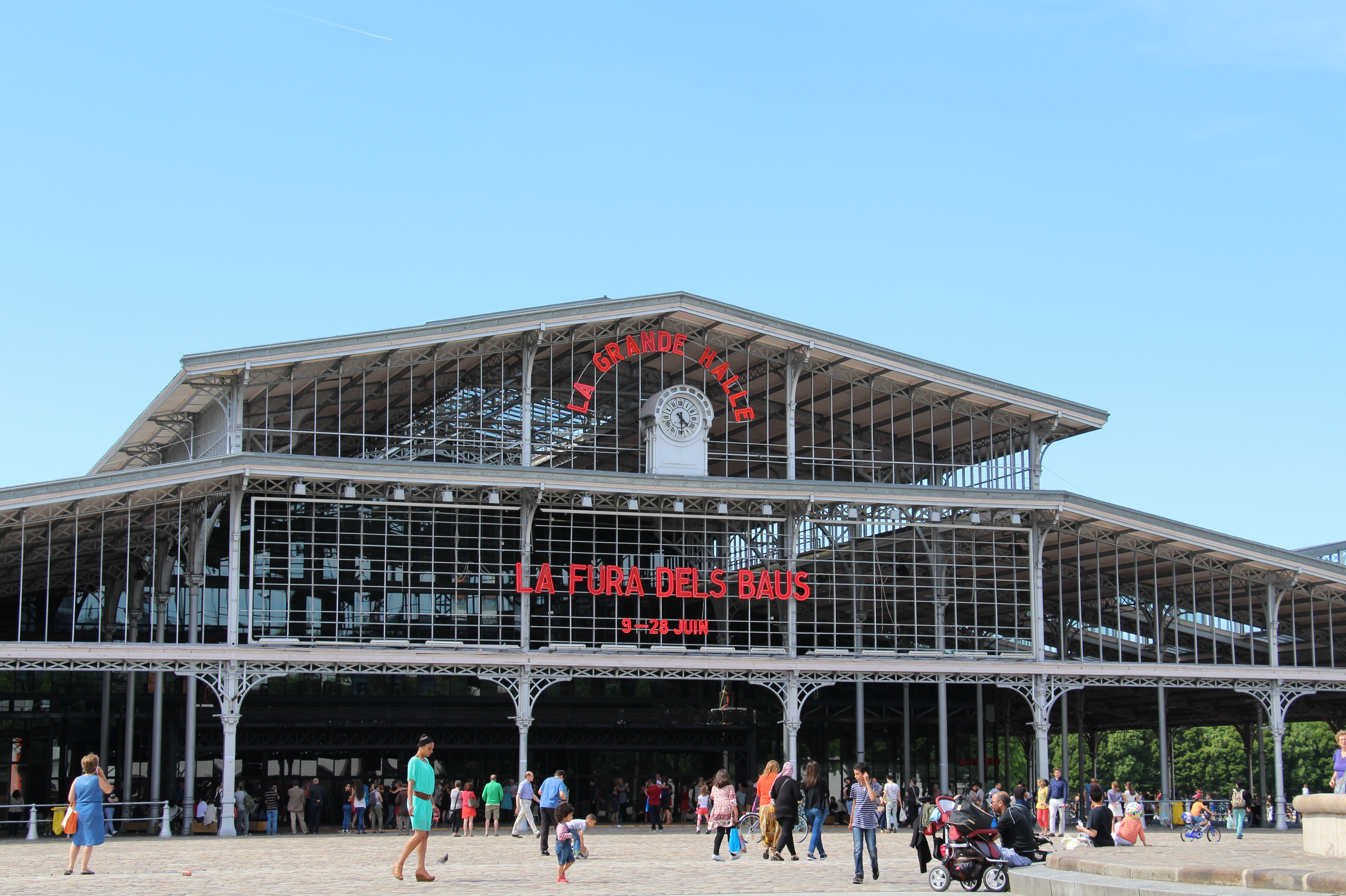
Grande halle de la Villette, 2015

The runway show was staged on 5 March 2004 at the Grande halle de la Villette in Paris. It was the final show of the day. Although scheduled for 8:30 p.m., it did not start until 10. PPR president Francois-Henri Pinault and chairman Serge Weinberg, as well as departing Gucci CEO Domenico De Sole were in attendance. Other guests included designer Diane von Furstenberg, McQueen's friends Isabella Blow and Kate Moss, musician Grace Jones, and McQueen's mother.

The runway was a plain white circle, illuminated from below; author Andrew Wilson described it as an "alien landing pad". Models entered through a backlit door at the rear of the stage, suggesting the open door of an alien spaceship. The rings of ceiling lights, as well as pillars of light circling the stage in the finale, evoked the Roman Colosseum in the abstract. Author Judith Watt saw the lights as representing "the base of a hovering starship". Joseph Bennett returned to handle set design.

The soundtrack was primarily electropop but incorporated tracks from science fiction films and television shows. The themes from Close Encounters of the Third Kind and Doctor Who appeared, as did a sample from the initial fanfare of the Richard Strauss composition Also sprach Zarathustra, used in Stanley Kubrick's 1968 film 2001: A Space Odyssey. The 1980 Kate Bush song "Babooshka" was also used.

Let's say it's a little bit Queen Elizabeth the First meets War Of The Worlds [...] They are beautiful aliens [...] A little demented maybe, but beautiful.

— Makeup artist Tonee Roberio, reflecting on the styling

Guido Palau styled hair, while Val Garland handled make-up; both were frequent McQueen collaborators. Models were styled to look androgynous and somewhat alien, with their faces powdered pale and eyes slanted artificially with invisible tape. They wore wigs with short, tightly curled hair, echoing hairstyles found on ancient Greek statuary. Some critics found the styling "embryonic".

McQueen's longtime collaborator Shaun Leane created accessories for the collection, most notably the silver "Orchid" shoulder-piece that featured in the final look. According to Leane, McQueen requested a shoulder-piece with orchids made to look "quite alien [...] not from this planet". Leane had created a rose-adorned silver corset for McQueen's Spring/Summer 2000 Givenchy collection, and repeated the same process for the Orchid piece. He carved the shoulder section from clay and the flowers from wax. Both were cast in resin then electroplated with silver. The orchids were further oxidised so their colour contrasted with the shoulder portion.

=== Catwalk presentation ===
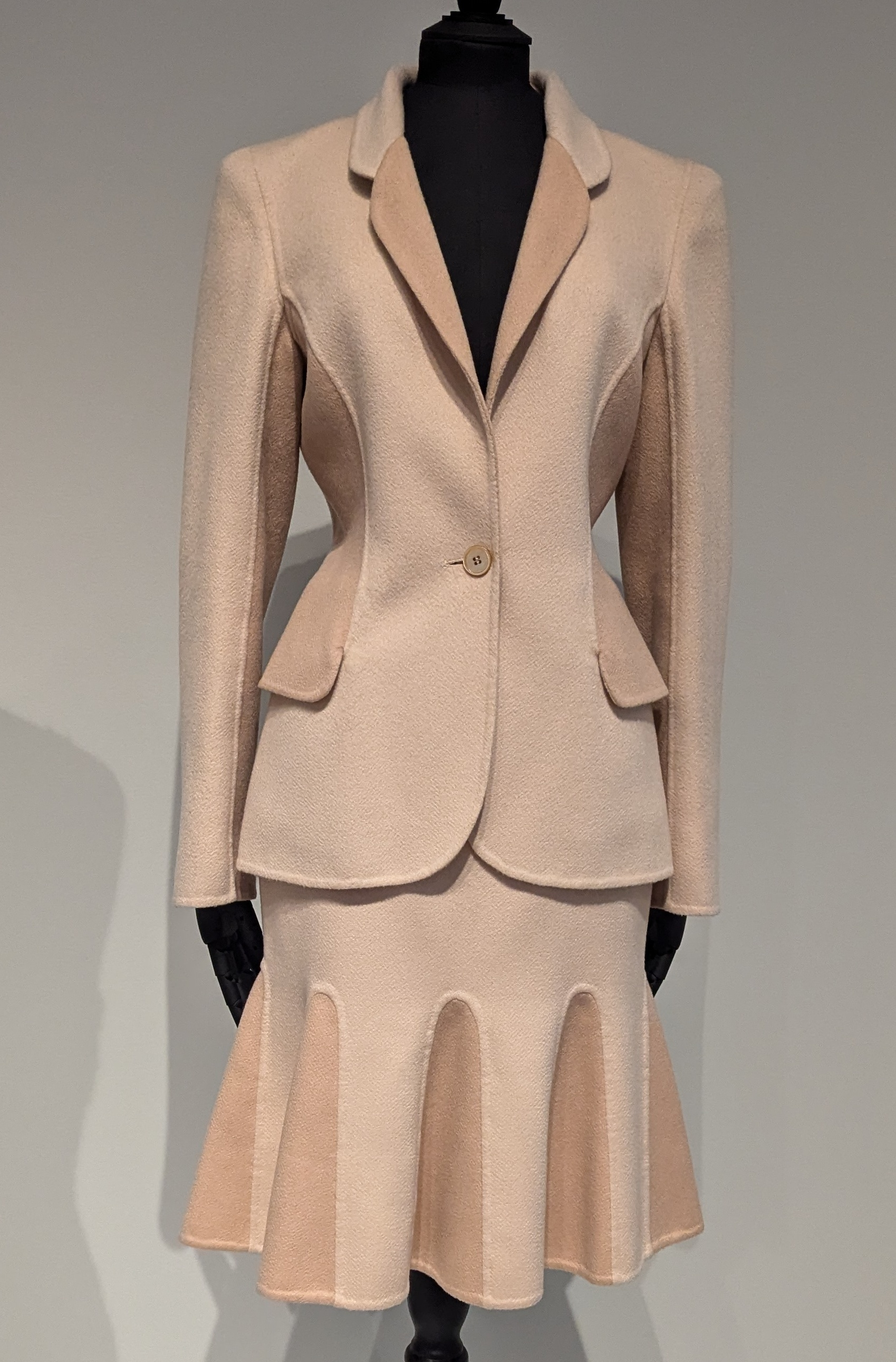
Suit from collection presented at Lee Alexander McQueen & Ann Ray - Rendez-Vous (2024)

Fifty-five pieces were presented. (Note: Vogue's overview of the collection incorrectly counts McQueen's white finale getup as Look 55. Their overview is missing an orchid-printed wrap dress that appears following Look 50, and consequently their count is off by one.) A brief projection before the show presented scenes from outer space. The opening phase consisted of flesh-toned items in soft fabrics like jersey and cashmere, as well as garments in soft leather and tweed. With Look 20, the presentation shifted to earth tones. This phase included McQueen's first jumpsuits, Looks 24 and 31, in tweed. More projected images of space preceded the final phase. Beginning at Look 40, the last portion of the collection comprised evening wear looks in dark satin, including the orchid-print dresses. The final three looks, all highly sculptural dresses, were presented in near-darkness, lit mainly by reflective fabric and LEDs inside the garments and jewellery.

For the show's finale, model Tiiu Kuik wore an evening gown in light grey tulle. The gown had an exaggerated hourglass silhouette: a flared A-line skirt, tightly cinched waist, and a V-shaped structured bodice that opened into a wide boat neckline. The look was styled with Shaun Leane's silver "Orchid" shoulder-piece. Kuik walked onto the darkened stage as concentric rings of light flashed on the floor and the sound of a heart monitor began playing. She stopped in the centre and held her arms out beseechingly while a spotlight illuminated her from the ceiling. The heart monitor sound gradually slowed into a flatline. Lights resembling pillars surrounded the stage. The spotlight gradually dimmed until Kuik was in darkness.

The lights came back up and the show's models came out to take their final turn. McQueen came out to take his bow in a white suit, barefoot. He shook hands and embraced De Sole, who had brought McQueen's label into the Gucci Group and supported his work. McQueen later described his barefoot appearance as an indication of "how humbled I felt by what was happening".

== Reception ==
=== Positive ===
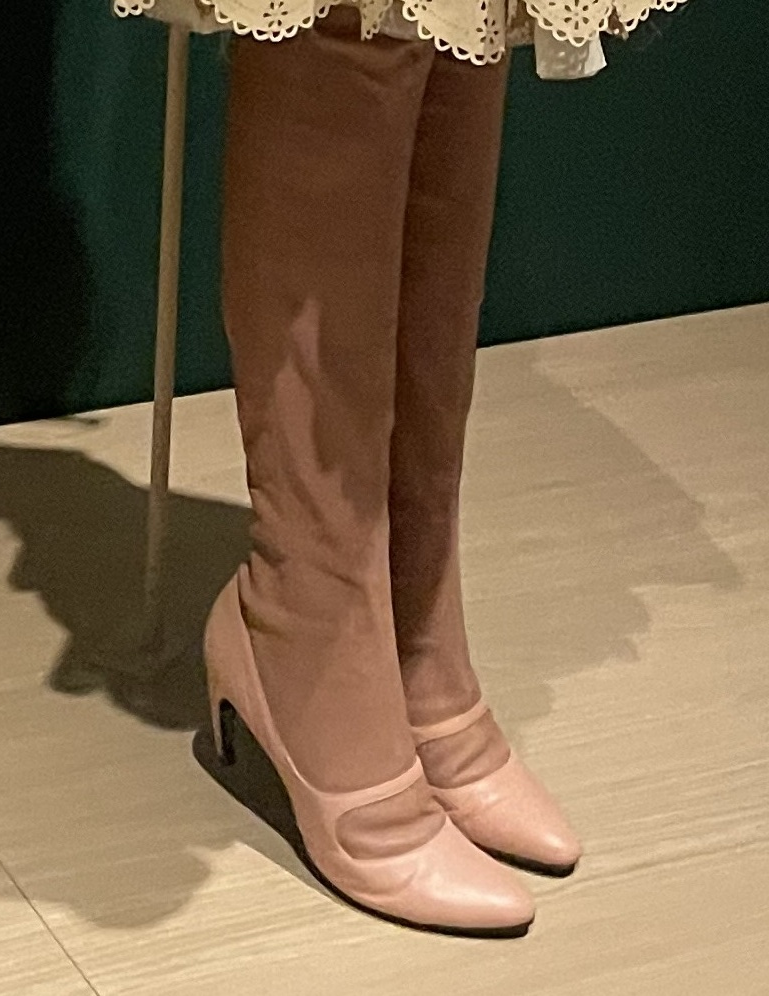
Boots from Pantheon ad Lucem at Mind, Mythos, Muse

Contemporary critical response to Pantheon ad Lucem was mixed; reviewers were divided about the subdued clothing and runway show. Some felt the clothing looked fresh and modern. For The New York Times, Cathy Horyn wrote that only McQueen and Miuccia Prada had made a "leap of faith" that season and created designs that looked ahead, rather than following contemporary trends. Michael Fink, a market director for Saks Fifth Avenue, told Women's Wear Daily (WWD) that he interpreted McQueen's "sci-fi fantasy" designs as part of a trend for designers to "search for what's modern". For The Independent, Susannah Frankel felt McQueen "rose to the challenge beautifully", calling the final dresses a "futuristic fashion moment".

Some critics described the collection's restraint as a response to an industry in which many designers had become reliant on complicated designs and runway shenanigans. The staff reviewer from WWD noted that the "eerie austerity" was an inverted manifestation of McQueen's "characteristic lavishness". Sarah Mower of Vogue and Jess Cartner-Morley at The Guardian both felt the pared-down designs were a smart move, positioning McQueen as uniquely forward-looking compared to his peers. In contrast, Booth Moore for the Los Angeles Times felt that designers in general were moving towards producing "salable clothes" rather than "runway antics".

Many reviewers highlighted the technical excellence of the designs as the collection's best feature. Cartner-Morley wrote one of the few strongly positive reviews, saying the "bare-bones production revealed how well McQueen's clothes, with their impeccable shape and finish, stand up to scrutiny". Horyn directed viewers to ignore the science fiction elements and focus on the cut and the silhouette of the garments, which she found unique. WWD wrote that the designs showcased McQueen's technical competence and ability "to make ultra-complicated shapes utterly wearable". The draped evening gowns were also a hit for many. Frankel highlighted the clingy jersey and leather garments as the collection's best, and noted the use of "complex seams" to allow tweed items to be similarly figure-hugging. In her review for the International Herald Tribune, Suzy Menkes found the draped gowns "connected beautifully with the body". Moore called the evening wear "exciting" and suitable for red carpet wear.

Reviewers felt McQueen's reliance on familiar silhouettes was intended to highlight his strong suits as a designer. Mower suggested that McQueen "seemed to be trying to summarize the essence of his design identity" with these items. Vanessa Friedman of the Financial Times connected the collection's self-referential styling to McQueen turning down the head designer position at YSL. Moore thought McQueen was trying to show his financial backers at Gucci Group that he was a serious designer in his own right, and could produce commercially viable clothing.

=== Negative ===
As for theatrics, he couldn't help himself in the finale. Three models waddled out in incandescent dresses with wide, angular tops and bottoms and tiny waists, which made them look like Scandinavian-designed salt and pepper shakers.

— Booth Moore, Los Angeles Times review of the collection

Despite these positive notes, there was a general feeling that the collection was not a success. WWD complained that the limited palette made the clothing feel dull and repetitive at times. Robin Givhan from The Washington Post found the collection lacked variety, and wrote that "McQueen seemed to retreat to the safety of overzealous tailoring and goofball flourishes" rather than challenging himself. Friedman felt the show was "missing his usual dramatic charge", but thought that some designs had a "subtle power". Mower concluded that Pantheon lacked McQueen's signature theatricality and "didn't quite live up to expectations". Both Menkes and Maggie Alderson at The Sydney Morning Herald compared the collection unfavourably to McQueen's previous show, Deliverance (Spring/Summer 2004).

Many reviewers thought the science fiction elements hampered the collection. Menkes wrote that the collection felt like 1960s Space Age fashion and compared several items to costumes from Star Trek. Moore felt many designs were "too Queen Amidala to be wearable". Stephen Todd of The Australian found there was "something disturbing" about the restrictive structure of some of the jackets and dresses, and ultimately felt that he did not understand the collection. At the Toronto Star, David Graham felt the alien styling "looked like a face-lift gone too far".

=== Retrospective ===
According to WWD, Pantheon ad Lucem had the 12th-highest pageviews at Style.com for the season. McQueen told Harper's Bazaar in August 2004 that he was unsure "if the press liked the collection much", but said it was selling "phenomenally" at retail.

In retrospect, McQueen's biographers tend to see Pantheon as one of McQueen's less significant works, devoting little analysis to it. Judith Watt, in her biography of McQueen, reports the collection as a disappointment to the audience, who had come to expect the designer to present them with "bread and circuses". However, she felt that the collection embodied "artful simplicity", writing that the draped bias-cut dresses demonstrated McQueen's understanding of how fabric worked with the body. Katherine Gleason, in her book Alexander McQueen: Evolution, found the collection "elegant and wearable". Andrew Wilson barely remarks on the clothing in Blood Beneath the Skin, and journalist Dana Thomas omits the show entirely from Gods and Kings. In the Little Book of Alexander McQueen, Karen Homer wrote that McQueen had successfully created a collection which pared his designs down to "his signature styles", but had done so "at the cost of an impressive show".

== Analysis and legacy ==
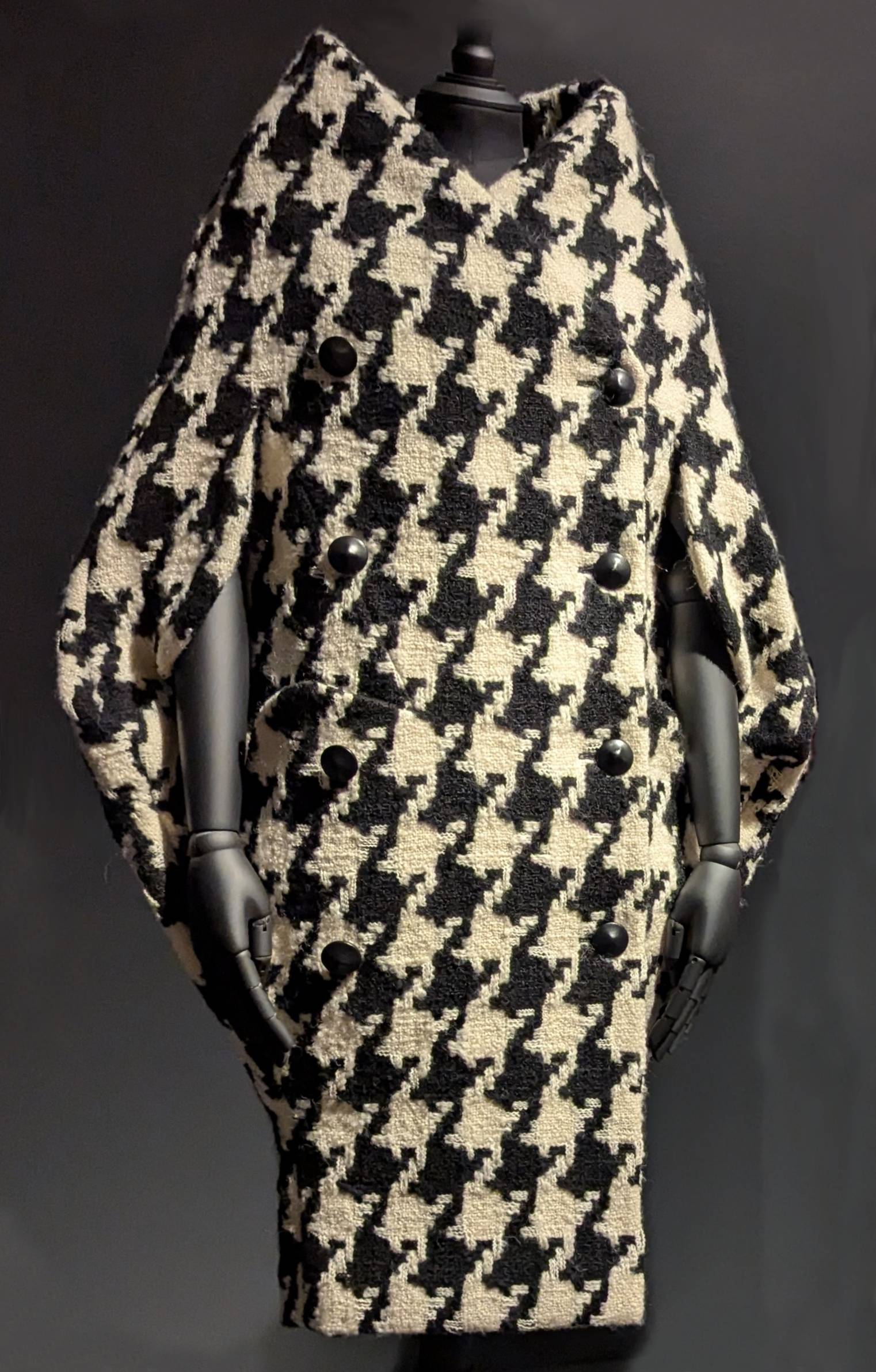
Houndstooth coat with structured wide neckline from The Horn of Plenty

Fashion journalist Alex Fury argued that Pantheon was an example of McQueen expressing his vision "through the bodies of his models" rather than through elaborate set dressing; in this case through the use of LED-inset garments. Wilson felt that the final scene, in which Kuik seemed to await being taken by aliens to another dimension, "articulated McQueen's desire for transcendence". Kristin Knox suggested that the exaggerated necklines from Looks 52 through 54 were visual precursors of the highly structured silhouettes he presented in The Girl Who Lived in the Tree (Autumn/Winter 2008) and The Horn of Plenty (Autumn/Winter 2009). She wrote that the collection marked "the evolution of his designs from fashions simply worn by models to designs integrated with their human carriers, becoming an organic part of them, like a second skin".

The showpiece finale gown appeared in a photoshoot in the December 2004 edition of Vogue, without the "Orchid" shoulder-piece. It was modelled by McQueen's friend Erin O'Connor and photographed by Tim Walker. The floor-length Greek-inspired column dress from Look 14 was popular in red carpet fashion that season. McQueen returned to Greek-inspired ensembles and the work of Azzedine Alaïa for Neptune (Spring/Summer 2006).

No clothing from Pantheon appeared in the 2011 retrospective Alexander McQueen: Savage Beauty, but two pieces of jewellery by Shaun Leane were selected for the exhibit's "Cabinet of Curiosities" section: the "Orchid" shoulder-piece worn in the final look, and a pair of disc earrings in copper. An orchid-print gown owned by the The Museum at FIT appeared in their 2016 exhibition Force of Nature. One dress and one pair of boots from Pantheon appeared in the 2022 exhibition Lee Alexander McQueen: Mind, Mythos, Muse. Curators described the dress as an example of how McQueen's "proficiency in piecing translates into garments that generate sinuous movement around the body". The National Gallery of Victoria (NGV) in Australia owns a beaded evening dress in silk organza and chiffon from Pantheon.

In 2017, Leane auctioned a number of pieces he had created for the house at Sotheby's in New York. The "Orchid" shoulder-piece sold for $43,750.

== Bibliography ==
- Alexander McQueen | Women's Spring/Summer 2004 | Runway Show. Alexander McQueen. 21 March 2012 – via YouTube.
- Bolton, Andrew (2011). Alexander McQueen: Savage Beauty. New York City: Metropolitan Museum of Art. ISBN 978-1-58839-412-5. OCLC 687693871.
- Esguerra, Clarissa M.; Hansen, Michaela (2022). Lee Alexander McQueen: Mind, Mythos, Muse. New York City: Delmonico Books. ISBN 978-1-63681-018-8. OCLC 1289986708.
- Fairer, Robert; Wilcox, Claire (2016). Alexander McQueen: Unseen. New Haven, Connecticut: Yale University Press. ISBN 978-0-300-22267-8. OCLC 946216643.
- Fox, Chloe (2012). Vogue On: Alexander McQueen. Vogue on Designers. London: Quadrille Publishing. ISBN 978-1849491136. OCLC 828766756.
- Gleason, Katherine (2012). Alexander McQueen: Evolution. New York City: Race Point Publishing. ISBN 978-1-61058-837-9. OCLC 783147416.
- Homer, Karen (2023). Little Book of Alexander McQueen: The Story of the Iconic Brand. London: Welbeck Publishing Group. ISBN 978-1-80279-270-6.
- Knox, Kristin (2010). Alexander McQueen: Genius of a Generation. London: A&C Black. ISBN 978-1-4081-3223-4. OCLC 794296806.
- Mora, Juliana Luna; Berry, Jess (2 September 2022). "Creative Direction Succession in Luxury Fashion: The Illusion of Immortality at Chanel and Alexander McQueen". Luxury. 9 (2–3): 117–140. doi:10.1080/20511817.2022.2194039. ISSN 2051-1817.
- Thomas, Dana (2015). Gods and Kings: The Rise and Fall of Alexander McQueen and John Galliano. New York City: Penguin Publishing. ISBN 978-1-101-61795-3.
- Watt, Judith (2012). Alexander McQueen: The Life and the Legacy. New York City: Harper Design. ISBN 978-1-84796-085-6. OCLC 892706946.
- Wilcox, Claire, ed. (2015). Alexander McQueen. New York City: Abrams Books. ISBN 978-1-4197-1723-9. OCLC 891618596.
  - Bethune, Kate. "Encyclopedia of Collections". In Wilcox (2015), pp. 303–326.
  - Fury, Alex. "Show, and Tell". In Wilcox (2015), pp. 220–233.
  - O'Neill, Alistair. "The Shining and Chic". In Wilcox (2015), pp. 261–280.
- Wilson, Andrew (2015). Alexander McQueen: Blood Beneath the Skin. New York City: Simon and Schuster. ISBN 978-1-4767-7674-3. OCLC 1310585849.
