= Neptune (collection) =

2006 fashion collection by Alexander McQueen

Look 51, a gold bodysuit with extreme cutouts, styled with a loose, open, marble-patterned blouse and gold sandals, worn by Valentina Zelyaeva

Neptune is the twenty-seventh collection by British designer Alexander McQueen, released for the Spring/Summer 2006 season of his eponymous fashion house. It took inspiration from classical Greek clothing, 1980s fashion, and the work of artists influential in that decade. The runway show was staged during Paris Fashion Week on 7 October 2005 at the industrial warehouse of the Imprimerie Nationale. Two main phases were presented, with 56 looks total: the first phase comprised monochrome black clothing, while the second featured a white, green, and gold palette. The collection's clothing and runway show both lacked McQueen's signature theatricality, and critical reception at launch and in retrospect was negative. Items from Neptune appeared in the 2022 exhibition Lee Alexander McQueen: Mind, Mythos, Muse.

== Background ==
British fashion designer Alexander McQueen was known for his imaginative, sometimes controversial designs. Over the course of his career, which lasted from 1992 until his death in 2010, he explored a broad range of ideas and themes, particularly sexuality, death, violence, romanticism, and historicism. He began as an apprentice on Savile Row, earning a reputation as an expert tailor; later he learned dressmaking as head designer for French fashion house Givenchy. (Note: From October 1996 to October 2001, McQueen was simultaneously head designer at Givenchy and at his own label.) His fashion shows were often theatrical to the point of verging on performance art. Sarah Burton, his assistant during much of his career, later recalled that he "just didn't like doing normal catwalk shows".

By the mid-2000s, McQueen had reached a stage of exhaustion with his career and the fashion industry, at one point saying, "I go in, I do my business, do the parties, and leave." Some critics felt that his designs and shows – particularly The Man Who Knew Too Much (Autumn/Winter 2005), which immediately preceded Neptune – had become increasingly conventional, prompting concerns that he was losing his touch for showmanship. Others, believing that McQueen tended to alternate between low-key and spectacular shows, anticipated that Neptune would be a return to extravagance.

== Concept and collection ==
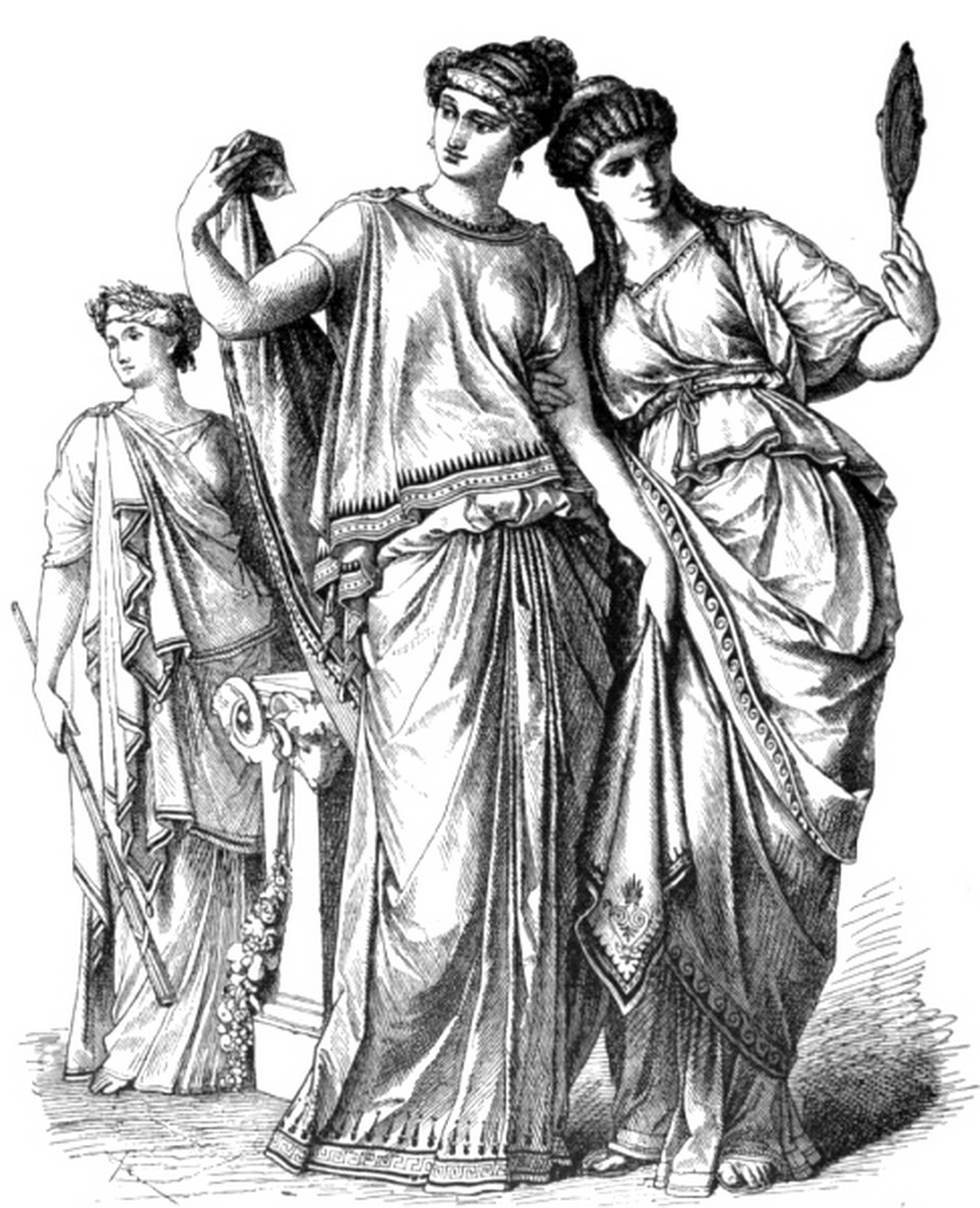
Sketch of women wearing clothing in the style of ancient Greece

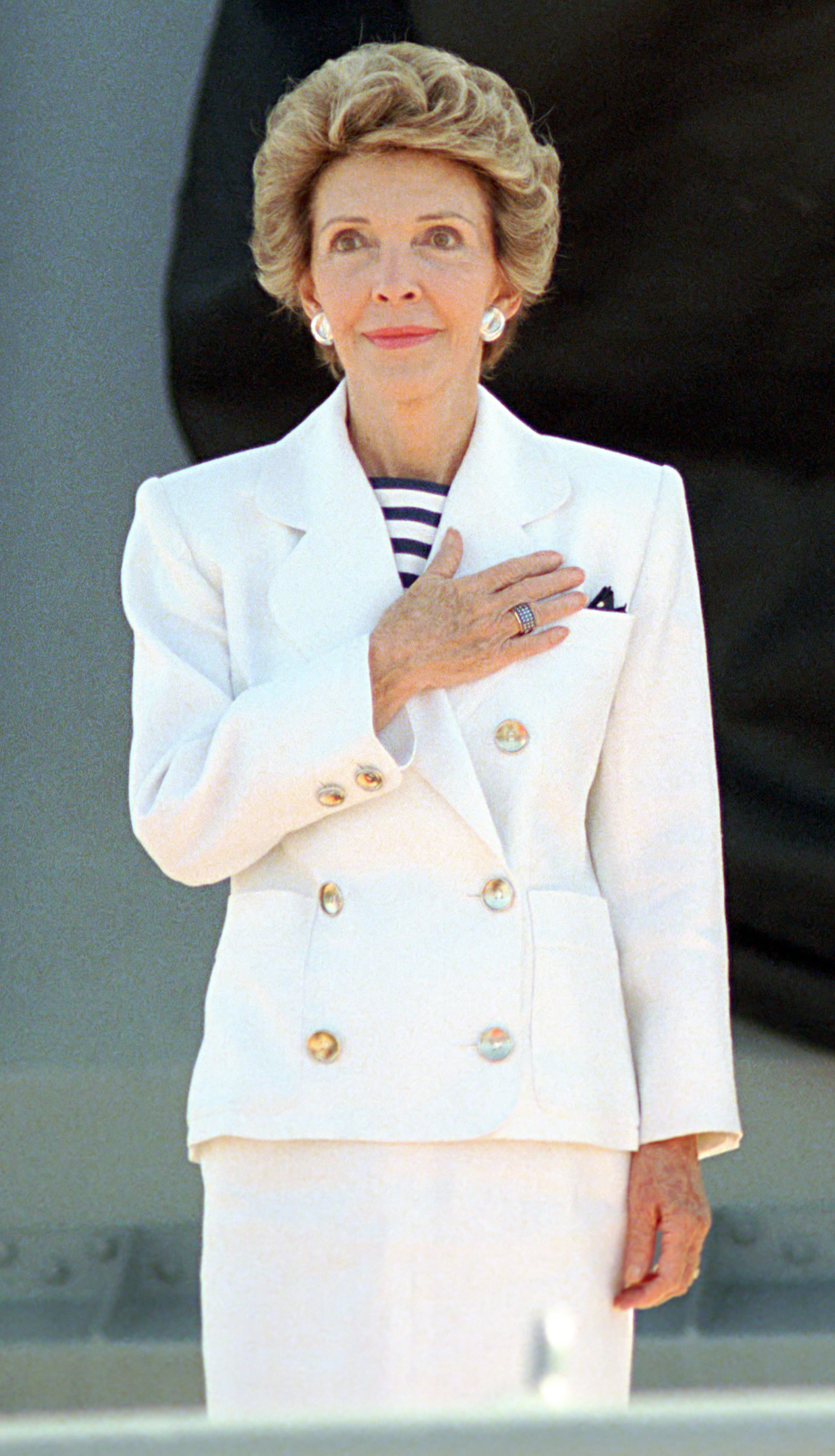
First Lady Nancy Reagan wearing a suit with shoulder pads, 1986

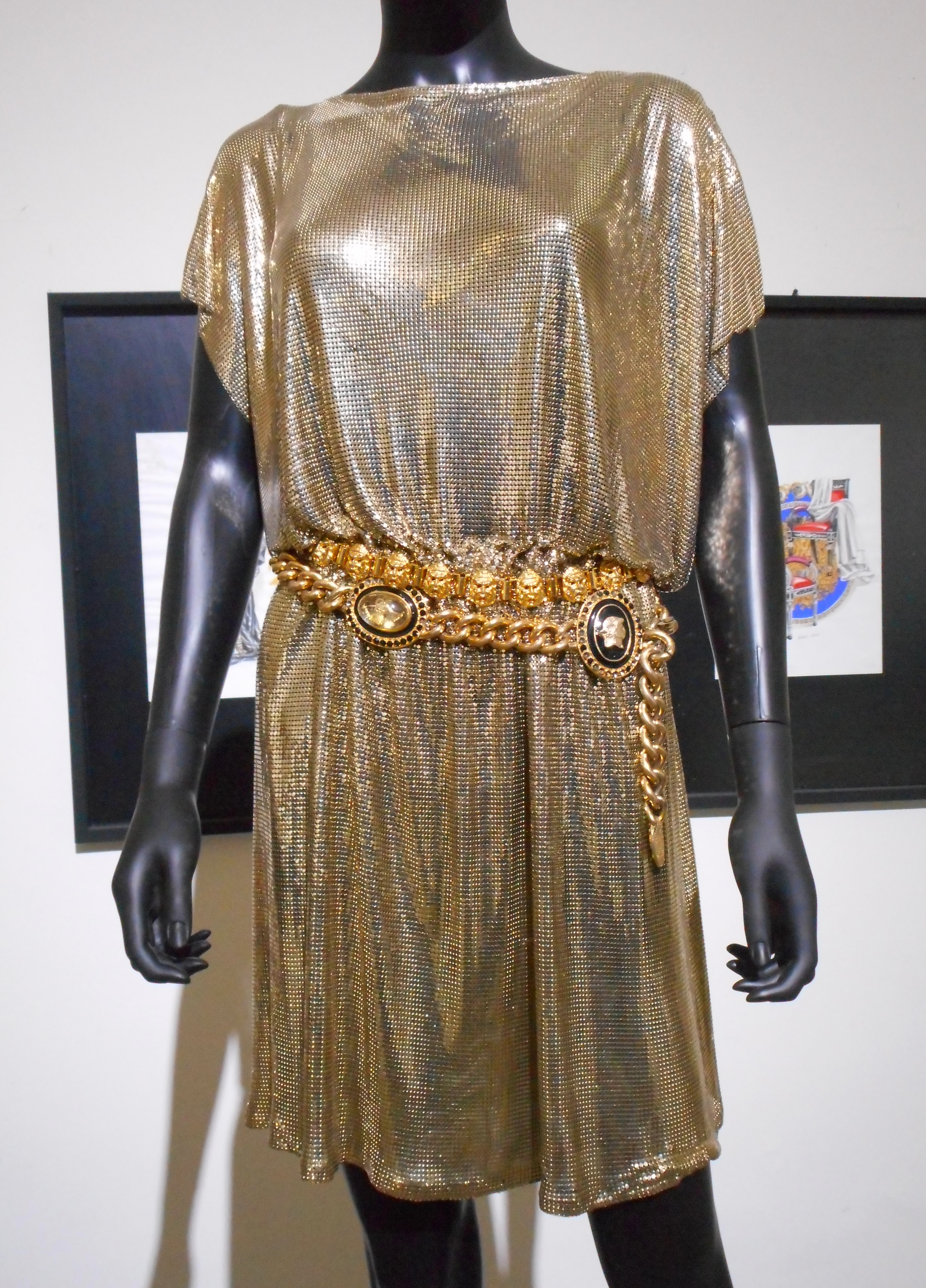
Greek-inspired Gianni Versace mini shift dress in gold chain mail with belts, Fall/Winter 1994

Neptune, presented for the Spring/Summer 2006 season, is the twenty-seventh collection by McQueen released for his eponymous fashion house. The collection was named for Neptune, the sea god of Roman mythology. The theming was loose, with elements drawn from the clothing of ancient Greece and fashion of the 1980s. There was a notable influence from power dressing, a trend in which women embraced business wear – especially tailored suits and shoulder pads – in order to project a powerful or successful presence in the workplace.

In his pre-show statement, McQueen said "I'm bringing sex back to the market. Women want to be excited again". He called Neptune a transitional collection, as he was "trying to find my niche. What do I do best? Sexy tailoring, sexy clothes." Accordingly, many designs were cut to be revealing, with short hemlines, sheer panels, and skin otherwise exposed.

Draped garments and column dresses referenced ancient Greek clothing. Look 55 from the runway show referenced the chiton, an ancient Greek garment, but substituted the traditional belt with a panel of beaded mesh, and had a modern miniskirt hemline. Looks 28 and 29, both long slim white dresses, bore similarities to classical caryatid columns as well as dresses from the classical revival of the 19th century. Some garments had decorative elements that displayed creatures from Greek mythology, such as the hippocampus and the phoenix.

The clothing in Neptune had clear references to designers whose work helped define the look of the 1980s: Tunisian designer Azzedine Alaïa, who was known for his body-conscious designs, and Italian designer Gianni Versace, whose work has been described as walking a thin line between seductive and tawdry. Critics also saw inspiration from Issey Miyake in the tightly pleated skirts of some ensembles, including Look 13. McQueen cited additional inspiration from fashion photographer Guy Bourdin, artist Jean-Paul Goude, both French, and Jamaican performer Grace Jones, all of whom contributed to the hard, high-glamour look of the 1980s.

== Runway show ==
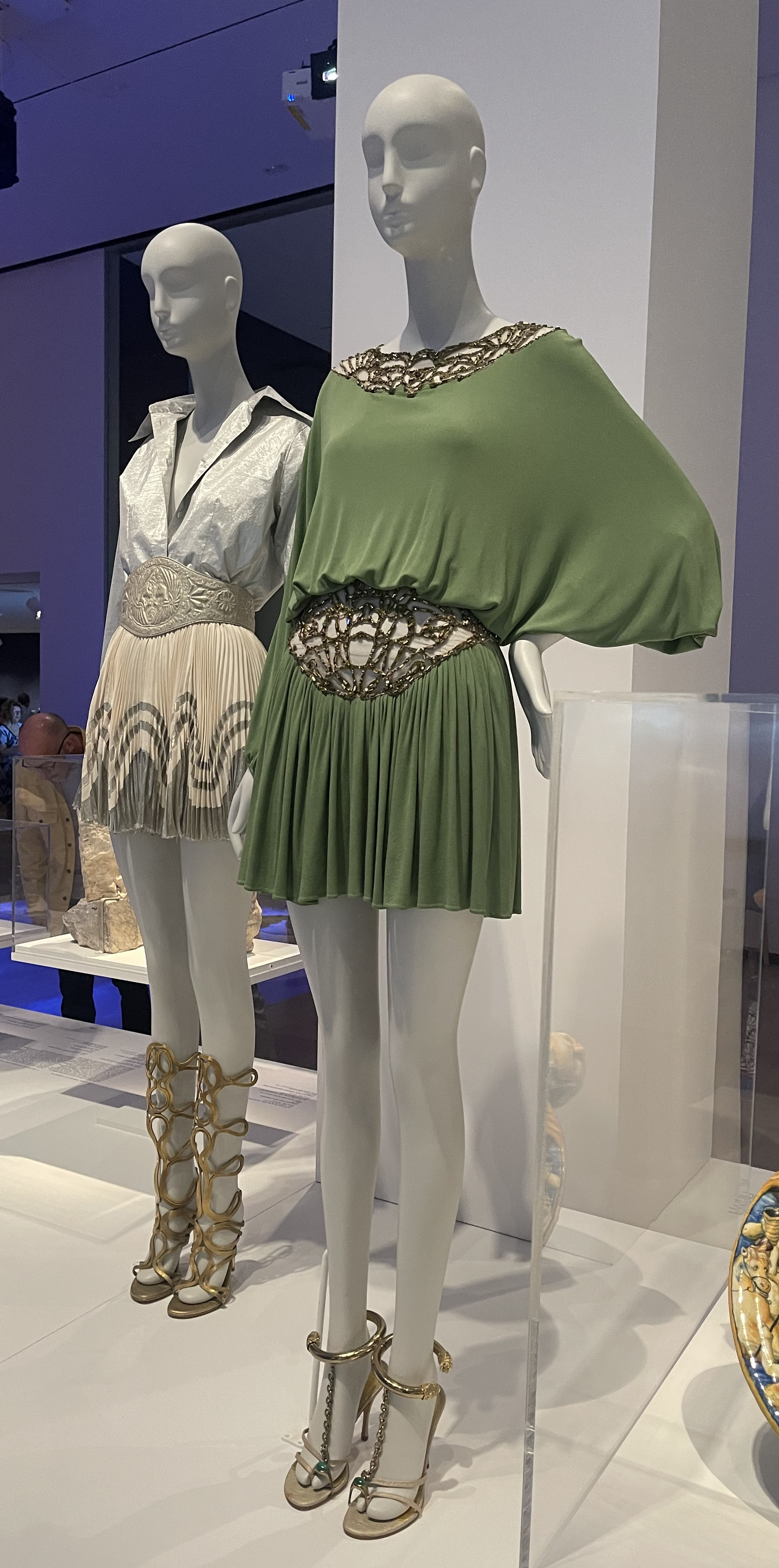
Look 13 (left) and Look 55 (right) at the exhibition Lee Alexander McQueen: Mind, Mythos, Muse (2023 staging)

The runway show for Neptune was staged during Paris Fashion Week on 7 October 2005 at the industrial warehouse of the Imprimerie Nationale in Paris. The invitation was a black and white photo of a model in a bubble bath whose nude form was only partially obscured by bubbles. McQueen's longtime collaborator Shaun Leane provided jewellery. Joseph Bennett returned to handle set design.

The show's simplicity was an extreme departure from the over-the-top spectacles reviewers had come to expect from McQueen: models walked down an unadorned 30-foot (9 m) concrete runway with stark lighting, posed briefly, then returned without fanfare. It was closer in style to the budget-strapped shows from his early days, such as Nihilism (Spring/Summer 1994). The soundtrack was built from female artists known for their self-confidence: primarily 1980s rock music, represented by songs from Siouxsie and the Banshees and Suzi Quatro, as well as tracks from Ike and Tina Turner, Missy Elliott, and Aretha Franklin.

All models were at least 5'11", echoing the trend for Amazonian supermodels of the 1980s. Bare legs and gladiator sandals with stiletto heels further emphasised their stature. Eugene Souleiman styled hair, which was slicked back on top and left to flow in waves across the shoulders. Charlotte Tilbury styled makeup in a "simple and glamorous" style. Some models carried handbags, which McQueen had debuted in the previous season. At the show's end, after the models took their final turn, McQueen appeared to take his bow. He wore a shirt reading "We Love You Kate" as a gesture of public support toward his friend, English supermodel Kate Moss, who at the time of the show was embroiled in a scandal over alleged drug use.

Two main phases were presented, with 56 looks total. The first half comprised monochrome black ensembles with white, silver, and grey accents and a focus on tailoring, while the second half involved outfits in a palette of white, green, and gold with a draped "Greek goddess" look. Looks 33, 51, and 54 from the second phase featured metallic bodysuits with extreme cut-outs, suggestive of swimwear. Some reviewers found that the second phase bore similarities to Search for the Golden Fleece, McQueen's 1997 debut as head designer at Givenchy – that collection also took inspiration from Greek mythology and had a gold and white palette.

== Reception ==
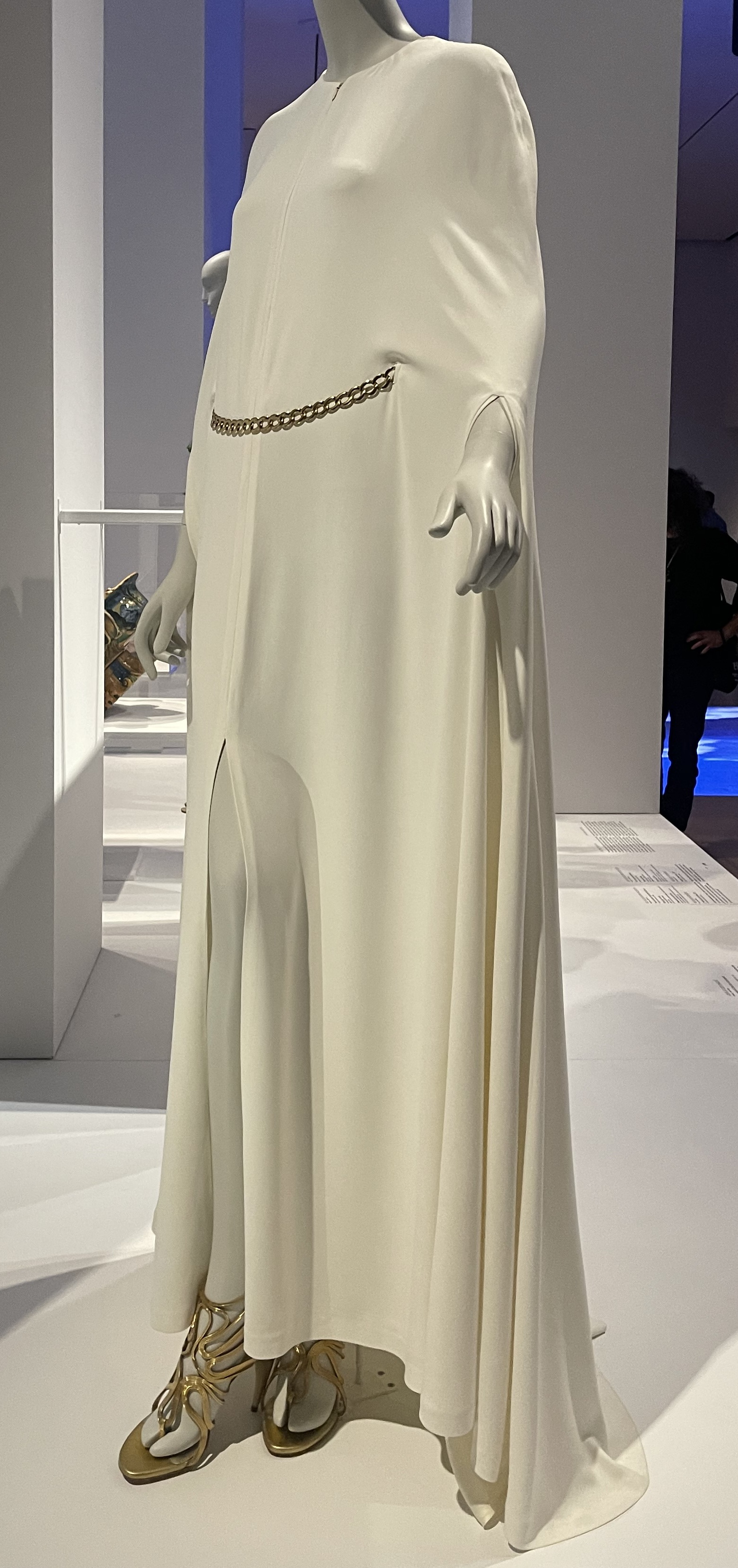
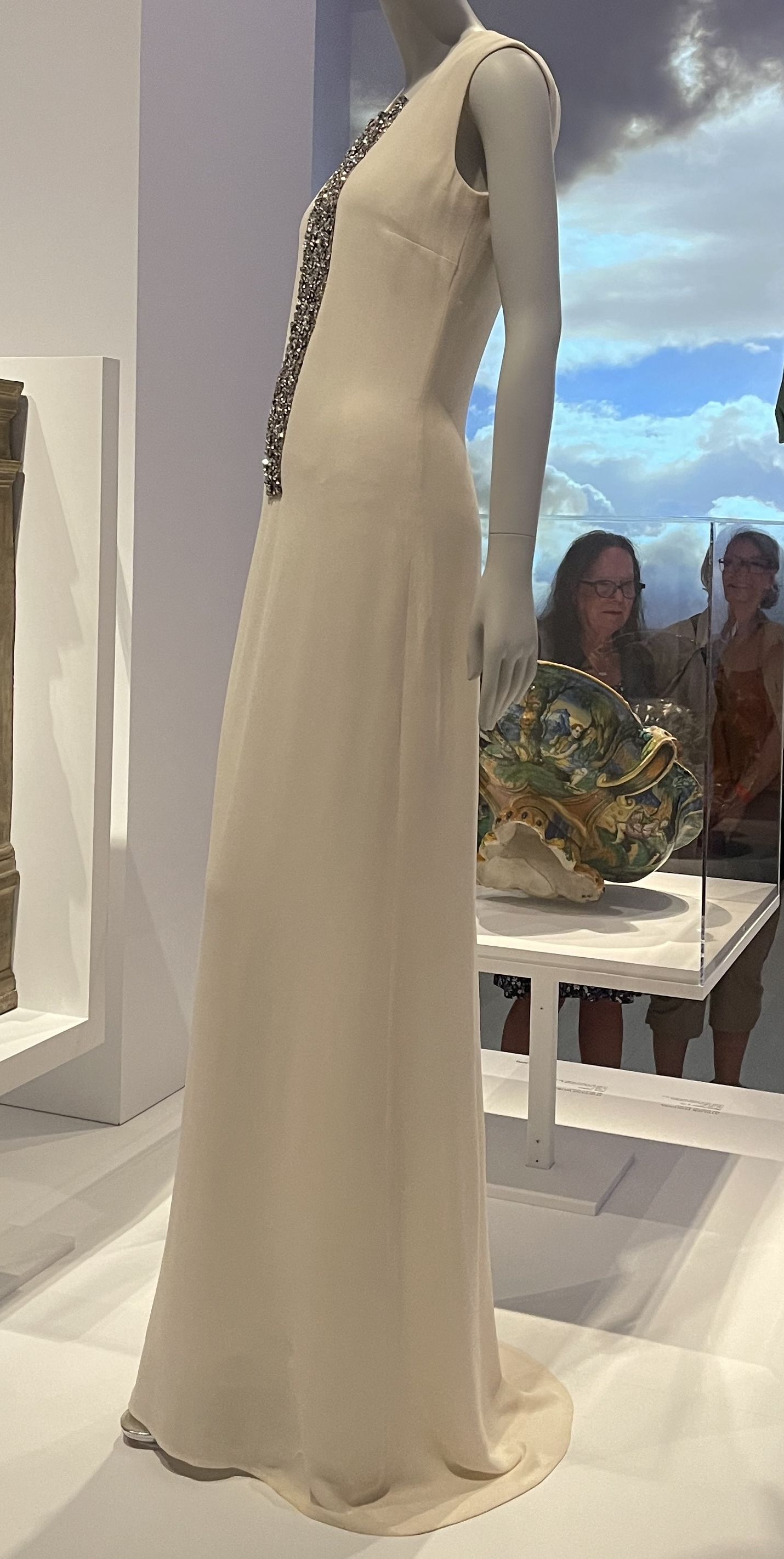
Looks 28 and 29 at Mind, Mythos, Muse

Lacking McQueen's signature theatricality, Neptune was poorly received at launch. Reviewers who expected the return of his bombastic runway shows were disappointed by the minimalist experience. Jess Cartner-Morley of The Guardian noted that aside from McQueen's appearance in the Kate Moss shirt, the collection lacked his customary runway "shock tactics". The presentation forced the focus onto the clothing, not necessarily to its benefit. Sarah Mower's review for Vogue was uniformly negative: she found both show and clothing dull. Both the staff writer for Women's Wear Daily and Cathy Horyn of The New York Times commented on the aggressive aesthetic of the collection. Horyn wrote that McQueen had "grasped the notion of sexiness technically but not with feeling or belief".

The overly commercial designs led to the assumption that McQueen was designing for sales and producing clothes that lacked his usual artistic flair. Mower stated that she was not criticising McQueen for wanting to sell clothing, but felt that Neptune did not live up to his artistic capabilities. The staff writer for Women's Wear Daily agreed that McQueen might have been designing with sales numbers in mind, suggesting that McQueen was "stifling his brilliance". Horyn compared McQueen and fellow British designer John Galliano – a common occurrence due to their roughly parallel career arcs and similarly maximalist styles – noting that both seemed to be reining in their creativity in favour of commercial appeal that season.

Several critics drew unflattering comparisons to costumes from genre fiction. Mower's review reserved particular scorn for the metallic bodysuits, which she wrote had "all the finesse of something left over from an eighties sci-fi TV series". The staff writer for Women's Wear Daily found the collection had failed to achieve the Greek goddess look McQueen was going for, and called it "a meeting of Xena and a well-turned-out sci-fi high priestess". Cartner-Morley described the collection as an "ill-matched" mix between 1970s rock and roll fashion and a Greek goddess look, with a result that looked more like comic book superheroine Wonder Woman.

Some reviewers found positive aspects amid their criticism. Women's Wear Daily found the clothing in Neptune "more refined" than in Golden Fleece and called out Look 29, a long white column dress, as potential red carpet wear, saying it should "prove hyper telegenic". Horyn found Look 35, a tailored white trouser suit, to be the "smartest" and "subtlest" in the collection.

== Legacy ==
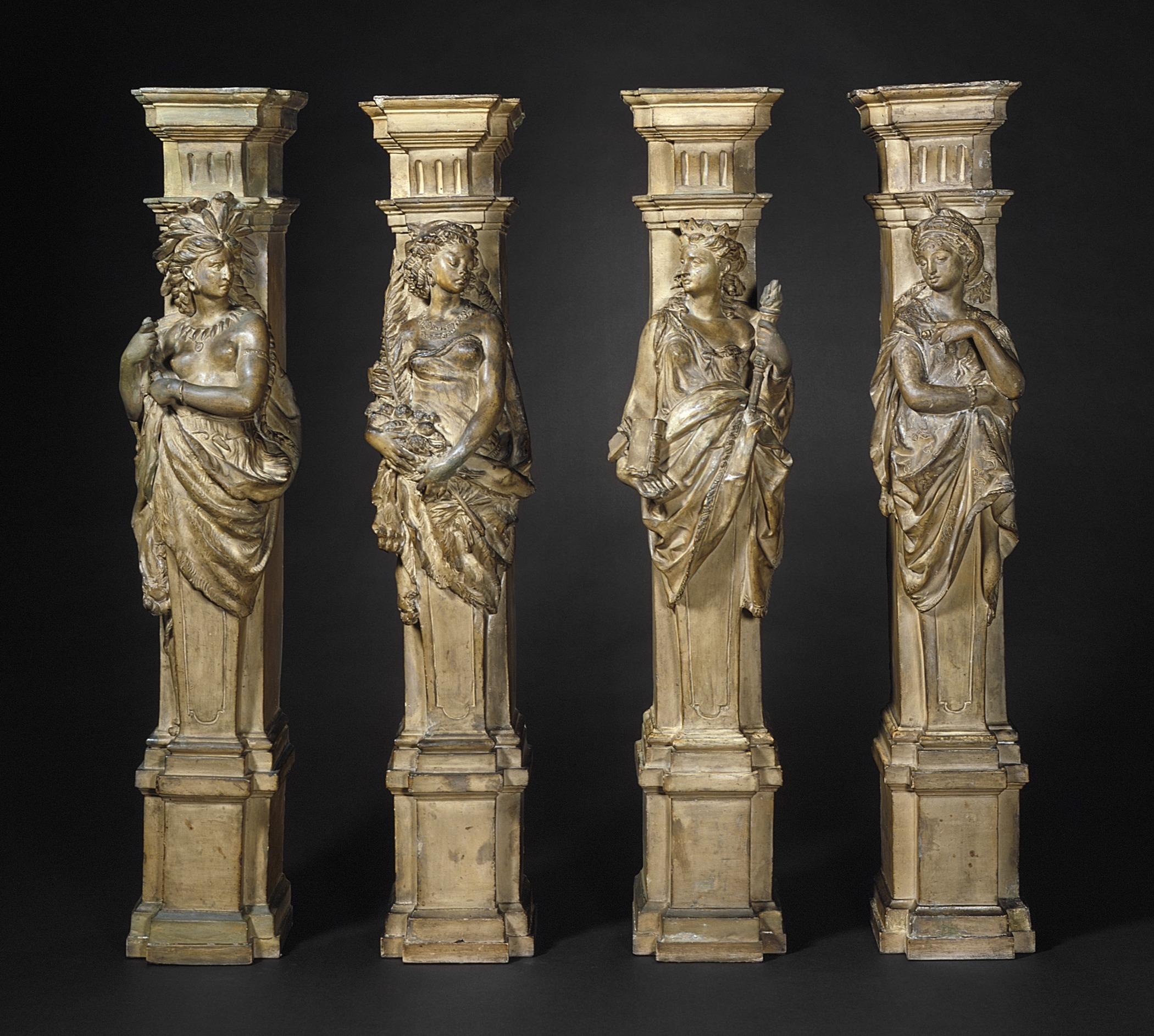
The exhibition Lee Alexander McQueen: Mind, Mythos, and Muse compared the collection's long white dresses to Caryatids of the Four Continents (Aimé Jules Dalou, c. 1867).

The collection is viewed with little enthusiasm in retrospect. In her 2012 biography of McQueen, Judith Watt wrote that it "screamed Cinecittà kitsch", referring to the Cinecittà film studio in Rome. In her 2015 book Gods and Kings, Dana Thomas called it a "soulless exercise" indicative of McQueen's late-career malaise, and wrote that the "only thing notable about that show" was the Kate Moss T-shirt. Andrew Wilson does not even discuss the clothing in Blood Beneath the Skin, his 2015 biography of McQueen, mentioning the collection only to note the supportive gesture for Moss. Introducing the collection in Alexander McQueen: Unseen (2016), fashion theorist Claire Wilcox remarked that it was "perhaps the closest McQueen ever got to staging a beauty contest, albeit for superwomen."

The retrospective exhibition Alexander McQueen: Savage Beauty did not include any items from Neptune in its 2011 staging at New York's Metropolitan Museum of Art. Several dresses from Neptune owned by the Los Angeles County Museum of Art appeared in Lee Alexander McQueen: Mind, Mythos, Muse, a 2022 exhibition that explored McQueen's work as it related to art history. Neptune was placed in the "Mythos" section of the exhibition, which examined collections inspired by religion and mythology. The exhibition compared the collection's long white dresses to Caryatids of the Four Continents (c. 1867) by French sculptor Aimé Jules Dalou, noting that both evoked the idea of women as "pillars of strength".

In 2017, Shaun Leane auctioned a number of pieces he had created for the house at Sotheby's in New York, including three arm cuffs and a torc necklace from Neptune. The arm cuffs sold for an average of approximately $2,900, and the necklace for $3,750. Fashion collector Jennifer Zuiker auctioned her McQueen collection in 2020, including at least two pieces from Neptune. A nude bodysuit with severe cut-outs (Look 54) sold for a reported $3,437, while a green minidress with jewelled accents (Look 56) sold for a reported $6,875.

In the final episode of Canadian sitcom Schitt's Creek, which aired in April 2020, the character Moira Rose (played by Catherine O'Hara) wears Look 28 from Neptune as part of her ensemble for officiating a wedding. Series co-creator Dan Levy sourced it from a consignment store, and described the beaded skull on the back of the dress as the reason he picked it. Milly Alcock wore Look 38, a long cream dress with gold chains for the bodice, to the 2022 premiere of House of the Dragon.

== Bibliography ==
- Bolton, Andrew (2011). Alexander McQueen: Savage Beauty. New York City: Metropolitan Museum of Art. ISBN 978-1-58839-412-5.
- Esguerra, Clarissa M.; Hansen, Michaela (2022). Lee Alexander McQueen: Mind, Mythos, Muse. New York City: Delmonico Books. ISBN 978-1-63681-018-8. OCLC 1289986708.
- Fairer, Robert; Wilcox, Claire (2016). Alexander McQueen: Unseen. New Haven, Connecticut: Yale University Press. ISBN 978-0-300-22267-8. OCLC 946216643.
- Gleason, Katherine (2012). Alexander McQueen: Evolution. New York City: Race Point Publishing. ISBN 978-1-61058-837-9.
- Knox, Kristin (2010). Alexander McQueen: Genius of a Generation. London: A&C Black. ISBN 978-1-4081-3223-4.
- Mora, Juliana Luna; Berry, Jess (2 September 2022). "Creative Direction Succession in Luxury Fashion: The Illusion of Immortality at Chanel and Alexander McQueen". Luxury. 9 (2–3): 117–140. doi:10.1080/20511817.2022.2194039. ISSN 2051-1817.
- Thomas, Dana (2015). Gods and Kings: The Rise and Fall of Alexander McQueen and John Galliano. New York City: Penguin Publishing. ISBN 978-1-101-61795-3. OCLC 951153602.
- Watt, Judith (2012). Alexander McQueen: The Life and the Legacy. New York City: Harper Design. ISBN 978-1-84796-085-6. OCLC 892706946.
- Wilcox, Claire, ed. (2015). Alexander McQueen. New York City: Abrams Books. ISBN 978-1-4197-1723-9. OCLC 891618596.
  - Bethune, Kate. "Encyclopedia of Collections". In Wilcox (2015), pp. 303–326.
- Wilson, Andrew (2015). Alexander McQueen: Blood Beneath the Skin. New York City: Simon and Schuster. ISBN 978-1-4767-7674-3.
