= It's Only a Game =

It's Only a Game may refer to:

- It's Only a Game (comic strip), a sports-and-game-oriented comics panel by Charles M. Schulz
- It's Only a Game (collection), a 2005 fashion collection by Alexander McQueen
