= Deluxe: How Luxury Lost Its Luster =

Book by Dana Thomas

- Author: Dana Thomas
- Language: English
- Subject: Luxury goods, Fashion
- Genre: Non-fiction
- Published: 2007 (Penguin Press)
- Publication place: United States
- Media type: Print, e-book
- Pages: 384 pages
- ISBN: 0-143-11370-4

Deluxe: How Luxury Lost Its Luster is a 2007 book by Paris-based American journalist Dana Thomas. It was a New York Times bestseller.

== Content ==
The book examines the corporate consolidation of small family-run luxury businesses into luxury goods holding companies, and their process of "democratizing" luxury by making it available for sale to the masses in the forms of handbags, clothing, and accessories. These new luxury conglomerates—principally Kering, which owns Alexander McQueen, Balenciaga, Brioni, and Gucci; Richemont, which owns Dunhill, Cartier, Jaeger-LeCoultre, Montblanc, and Van Cleef & Arpels, and LVMH, which owns Bulgari, Dior, DKNY, Fendi, Givenchy, Marc Jacobs, Louis Vuitton, Thomas Pink, as well as De Beers, TAG Heuer, and Sephora—have achieved success with fashion shows, provocative commercials, dressing celebrities for red carpet events, and through licensing, franchising, outlet malls, and online retailing.

According to Thomas, this trend has led to inferior quality, rampant outsourcing to developing nations, and a massive surge in both counterfeiting and the illicit activities it funds.

== Critical reception ==
The New York Times chief book critic Michiko Kakutani called Deluxe: "A crisp, witty social history that's as entertaining as it is informative." The Los Angeles Times stated: "What Fast Food Nation did for food service, this book does for fashion, exposing the underbelly of the $157-billion luxury industry and the lockstep consumer psychology behind its glamorous veneer." And Fareed Zakaria said: "Globalization, capitalization, class, and culture . . . A fascinating book."
