= Jess Cartner-Morley =

British journalist (born 1973)

- Born: 1 June 1973 (age 53)
- Education: University of Oxford
- Occupation: Fashion journalist
- Years active: 2000―present
- Spouse: Tom Findlay
- Children: 2

Jess Cartner-Morley (born 1 June 1973) is a British journalist. She has been the fashion editor of The Guardian since 2000.

After attending the private City of London School for Girls, and studying History at Oxford University, Cartner-Morley had work experience at Just Seventeen magazine before joining The Guardian as a researcher. She was deputy fashion editor before becoming The Guardian's fashion editor in June 2000.

In 2010, she described novelist Jilly Cooper as one of her heroes.

== Personal life ==
She is married to Tom Findlay from the electronic music duo Groove Armada. They have two children. They live in North London.
