= Gods and Kings: The Rise and Fall of Alexander McQueen and John Galliano =

2015 book by Dana Thomas

- First edition (US)
- Author: Dana Thomas
- Language: English
- Subject: Luxury goods, Fashion
- Genre: Non-fiction
- Published: 2015 (Penguin Press)
- Publication place: United States
- Media type: Print, e-book
- Pages: 432 pages
- ISBN: 1-594-204942

Gods and Kings: The Rise and Fall of Alexander McQueen and John Galliano is a 2015 book by Paris-based American journalist Dana Thomas.

== Synopsis ==
Gods and Kings: The Rise and Fall of Alexander McQueen and John Galliano is a double biography on the lives of two heralded British fashion designers, Alexander McQueen and John Galliano.

== Reception ==
Critical reception for Gods and Kings has been positive. The New York Times wrote that "Ms. Thomas has produced a slightly seedy-feeling but, yes, addictive biography of two outsize personalities who seem less the gods or kings of her title than Captain Hook and Peter Pan." In contrast, The Guardian heavily criticized the book for offering an uneven portrayal of McQueen and Galliano, stating that:

to read her brass-tacks account, you'd get the impression that Galliano's career has been fail after fail. She implicates the "gushing" fashion press in praising his work – we're an easy bunch to disparage – yet she seems more or less blind to the meaning and emotion others may have felt at Galliano's or McQueen's shows.
