= Dana Thomas =

American fashion and culture journalist (born 1964)

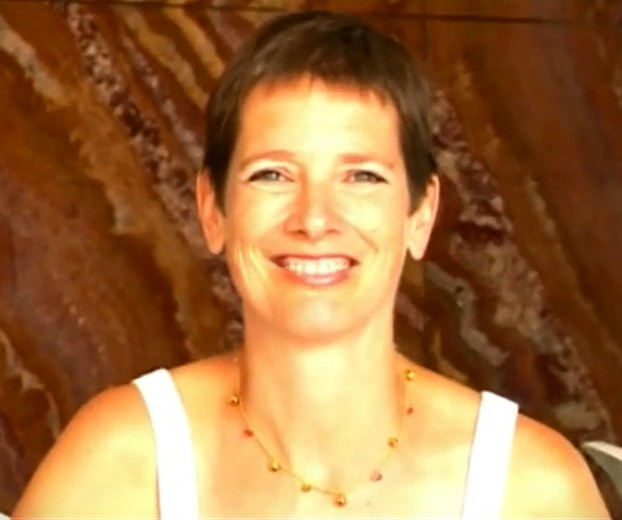
Thomas in 2012

Dana Thomas (born February 3, 1964) is an American fashion and culture journalist and author based in Paris. Her books include Deluxe: How Luxury Lost Its Luster, Gods and Kings: The Rise and Fall of Alexander McQueen and John Galliano and Fashionopolis: The Price of Fast Fashion and the Future of Clothes. She also wrote the script for Salvatore Ferragamo: The Shoemaker of Dreams, a feature-length documentary directed by award-winning Italian filmmaker Luca Guadagnino. It had its world premiere at the Venice Film Festival on September 5, 2020. She hosts The Green Dream, a sustainability podcast.

== Early life and education ==
Thomas was born in Washington, D.C., and raised in Radnor, Pennsylvania. She attended Radnor High School and graduated in 1981. Thomas earned a B.A. in Print Journalism at American University in Washington, D.C., in 1988.

== Career ==
She began her journalism career working for the Style section of The Washington Post in 1988.

Thomas is the European Editor for Palmer Magazine, and a regular contributor to The New York Times Style section. From 2020 to 2023, she was the Contributing European Sustainability Editor for British Vogue She served as a contributing editor for T: The New York Times Style Magazine from 2012 to 2017 and WSJ., the Wall Street Journal's monthly style magazine, from 2011 to 2012; as the European editor of Conde Nast Portfolio from 2008 to 2009; and as European cultural and fashion correspondent for Newsweek in Paris from 1995 to 2008. She has contributed to various publications including the New York Times Magazine, The New Yorker, Harper's Bazaar, Vogue, Los Angeles Times, Financial Times in London. She also writes regularly for Architectural Digest and Elle Decor.

She has spoken at the Aspen Ideas Festival, Harvard Business School, Yale School of Management, TedxOxford, Business of Fashion Voices, and the Copenhagen Fashion Summit.

She is the author of the New York Times bestseller Deluxe: How Luxury Lost Its Luster, published by The Penguin Press in 2007. The book addresses the disparity between the rarefied world that luxury once represented- populated by private, family-owned businesses that catered to the aristocracy and the billion-dollar, mass-producing and mass-marketing industry it is today. The New York Times called the Deluxe, "a crisp, witty social history that's as entertaining as it is informative."

In February 2015, Penguin Press published Thomas's second book, Gods and Kings: The Rise and Fall of Alexander McQueen and John Galliano, an investigative double biography of two monumental British fashion designers who succumbed to the pressures of corporate luxury fashion in a globalized world. In 2010, McQueen killed himself; a year later Galliano was fired from the creative helm of Christian Dior for a drunken anti-Semitic outburst in a Paris café.

In September 2019, Penguin Press published Thomas's third book, Fashionopolis: The Price of Fast Fashion and the Future of Clothes, an investigation into the damage wrought by the colossal clothing industry and the grassroots, high-tech, international movement fighting to reform it. The New Yorker called it "a glimpse into how consumerism, slowed to a less ferocious pace, might be reconciled with sustainability.” The New York Review of Books said it was a "Marley's Ghost-style warning of the irrevocable destructions to come . . . Thomas is engaging and vital.”

In 2019, she wrote the screenplay for Salvatore Ferragamo: The Shoemaker of Dreams, an award-winning feature-length documentary directed by Oscar-nominated Italian filmmaker Luca Guadagnino. The film had its world premiere at the Venice Film Festival on September 5, 2020. Prior to, Sony Pictures Classics acquired worldwide distribution rights to the film, excluding Italy.

Thomas is a member of the Anglo-American Press Association in Paris and the Overseas Press Club. She taught journalism at The American University of Paris from 1996 to 1999. In 1987, she received the Society of Professional Journalists Sigma Delta Chi Foundation Scholarship and the Ellis Haller Award for Outstanding Achievement in Journalism.

In 2017, Thomas was a fellow at the Logan Nonfiction Program of the Carey Institute for Global Good.

In 2023, Thomas won the Signal Awards' prize for Best Host (Current Events) for her podcast The Green Dream, about sustainability.

== Bibliography ==
- Deluxe: How Luxury Lost Its Luster (2007)
- Gods and Kings: The Rise and Fall of Alexander McQueen and John Galliano (2015)
- Fashionopolis: The Price of Fast Fashion and the Future of Clothes (2019)

== Films ==
- Salvatore Ferragamo: The Shoemaker of Dreams (2020)

== Podcast ==
- The Green Dream (2022)

== Decorations & Awards ==
- Chevalier of the Order of Arts and Letters (2016)
- Signal Awards - Best Host - Current Events (2023)
