= Voss (collection) =

2001 fashion collection by Alexander McQueen

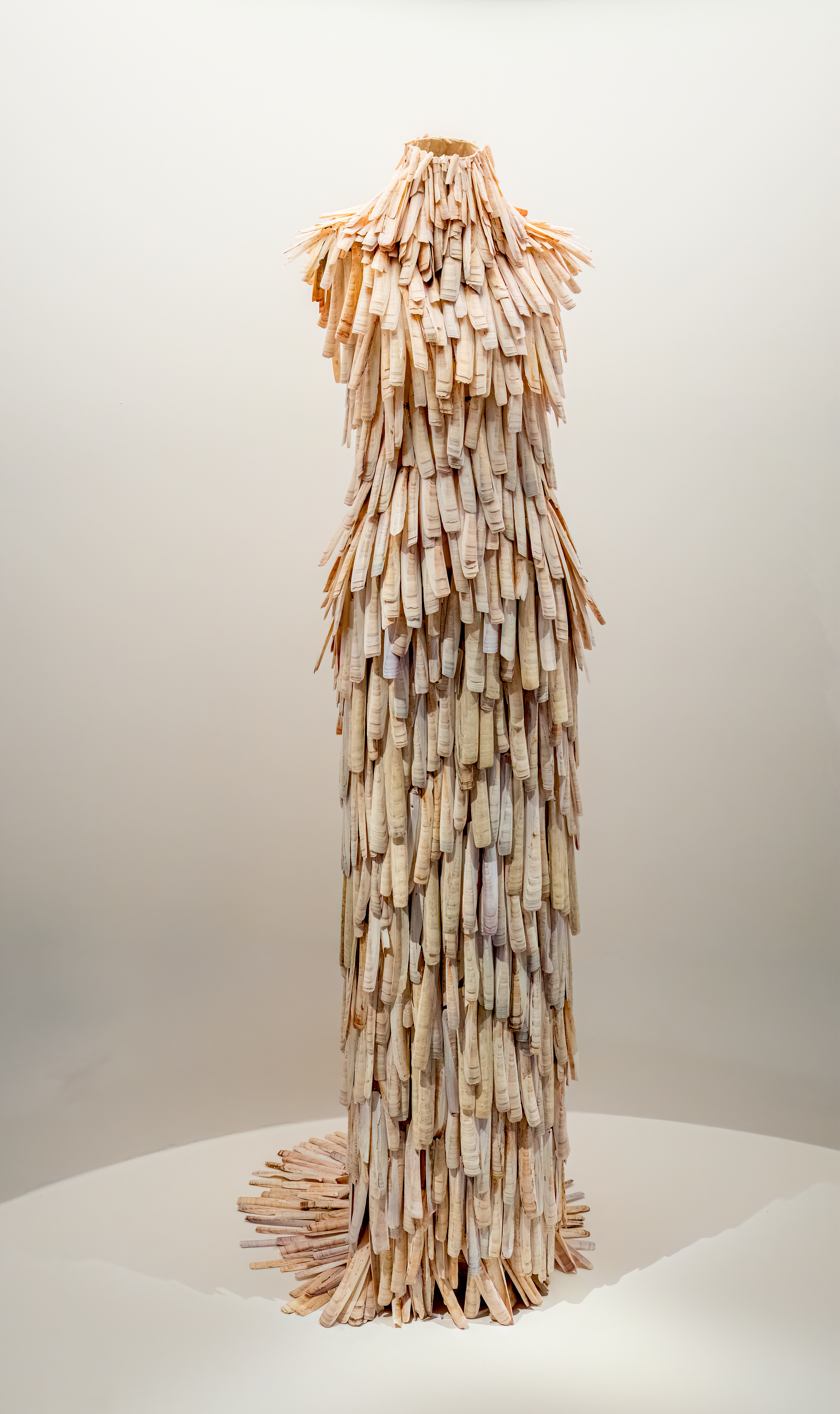
Razor clamshell dress from Voss at Sleeping Beauties: Reawakening Fashion, Metropolitan Museum of Art, 2024

Voss is the seventeenth collection by British fashion designer Alexander McQueen, released for the Spring/Summer 2001 season of his eponymous fashion house. The collection drew on imagery of madness and the natural world to explore ideas of bodily perfection, interrogating who and what was beautiful. Like many of McQueen's collections, Voss also served as a critique of the fashion industry, about which McQueen was often ambivalent. Voss featured a large number of showpiece designs, including dresses made with razor clam shells, an antique Japanese screen, taxidermy hawks, and microscope slides. The collection's palette mainly comprised muted tones; common design flourishes included Orientalist and surrealist elements. The collection is named for Voss, a Norwegian district well-known as a wildlife habitat.

The collection's runway show was staged on 26 September 2000 at the Gatliff Road Warehouse in London, as part of London Fashion Week. The show was staged inside a room-sized mirrored glass cube, with the audience seated outside. McQueen deliberately started the show an hour late, which forced the audience, composed largely of industry professionals, to watch themselves uncomfortably in the mirror. When the show started, the cube became transparent to the audience, revealing a space designed to look like a padded room in a stereotypical mental asylum. The models were styled to look unhealthy, with hair covered by bandages. They were directed to act as though they were having a "nervous breakdown" while walking. Seventy-six looks were presented, followed by a finale in which a glass cube at the centre shattered to reveal Michelle Olley, fat, nude, and covered in moths. (Note: For convenience, when referring to individual looks, this article uses the numbering from the Vogue retrospective of the collection. Their overview counts 78 looks, but contains some duplications and omissions that cause the count to be incorrect. Look numbers mentioned in this article have not been adjusted. In the Vogue numbering, Look 29 shows Looks 27 and 28 again. Looks 57 and 58, and Looks 65 and 66, are the same look in different photos. Looks 77 and 78 are alternate angles of Looks 24 and 59, respectively. Vogue omits a black ensemble following Look 4, a blue suit following Look 52, a black dress and cape following Look 57, an embroidered top with large shell earrings following Look 65, and a black tailored ensemble following Look 67.)

Critical response was positive, especially towards the showpiece ensembles and the performance art aspect. The show is regarded as one of McQueen's best, and has attracted a large amount of academic analysis, particularly pertaining to the collection's imagery of human-animal hybridisation and interrogation of beauty standards. Several models who walked in the show have discussed their experiences as challenging but positive. Ensembles from Voss are held by various museums and have appeared in exhibitions such as the McQueen retrospective Alexander McQueen: Savage Beauty.

== Background ==
British fashion designer Alexander McQueen was known for his imaginative, sometimes controversial designs, and dramatic fashion shows. Over the course of his career, which lasted from 1992 until his death in 2010, he explored a broad range of ideas and themes, particularly sexuality, death, violence, romanticism, and historicism. McQueen began his career as an apprentice on Savile Row, earning a reputation as an expert tailor. From October 1996 to October 2001, McQueen was – in addition to his responsibilities for his own label – head designer at French fashion house Givenchy.

McQueen frequently experimented with unconventional materials and references to nature in his collections. He often used animal parts, both natural and imitation, in his designs. Avian symbolism and imagery was a recurring theme throughout his career. His fifth collection, The Birds (Spring/Summer 1995), was dually inspired by ornithology, the study of birds, and the 1963 Alfred Hitchcock film The Birds, for which it was named. Moths and butterflies were another repeat motif.

McQueen had a difficult relationship with the fashion industry and the media. Early in his career, journalists often framed him as a working-class trespasser in an upper-class industry and preyed on his insecurities about his weight and looks. His Givenchy collections were poorly received; distressed, he resorted to smoking and drug use to deal with the pressure he felt to satisfy management and the press. McQueen was often ambivalent about continuing his career in fashion, which he described as toxic and suffocating. Several of McQueen's collections, including Voss, were intended as critiques of fashion. In It's a Jungle Out There (Autumn/Winter 1997), McQueen used the short lifespan of the Thomson's gazelle as a metaphor for the "fragility of a designer's time in the press." What a Merry-Go-Round (Autumn/Winter 2001), which followed Voss, depicted fashion as a circus. At the end of his career, McQueen lashed out again with The Horn of Plenty (Autumn/Winter 2009), which satirised the concept of a runway show and the wastefulness of the industry.

== Concept and collection ==
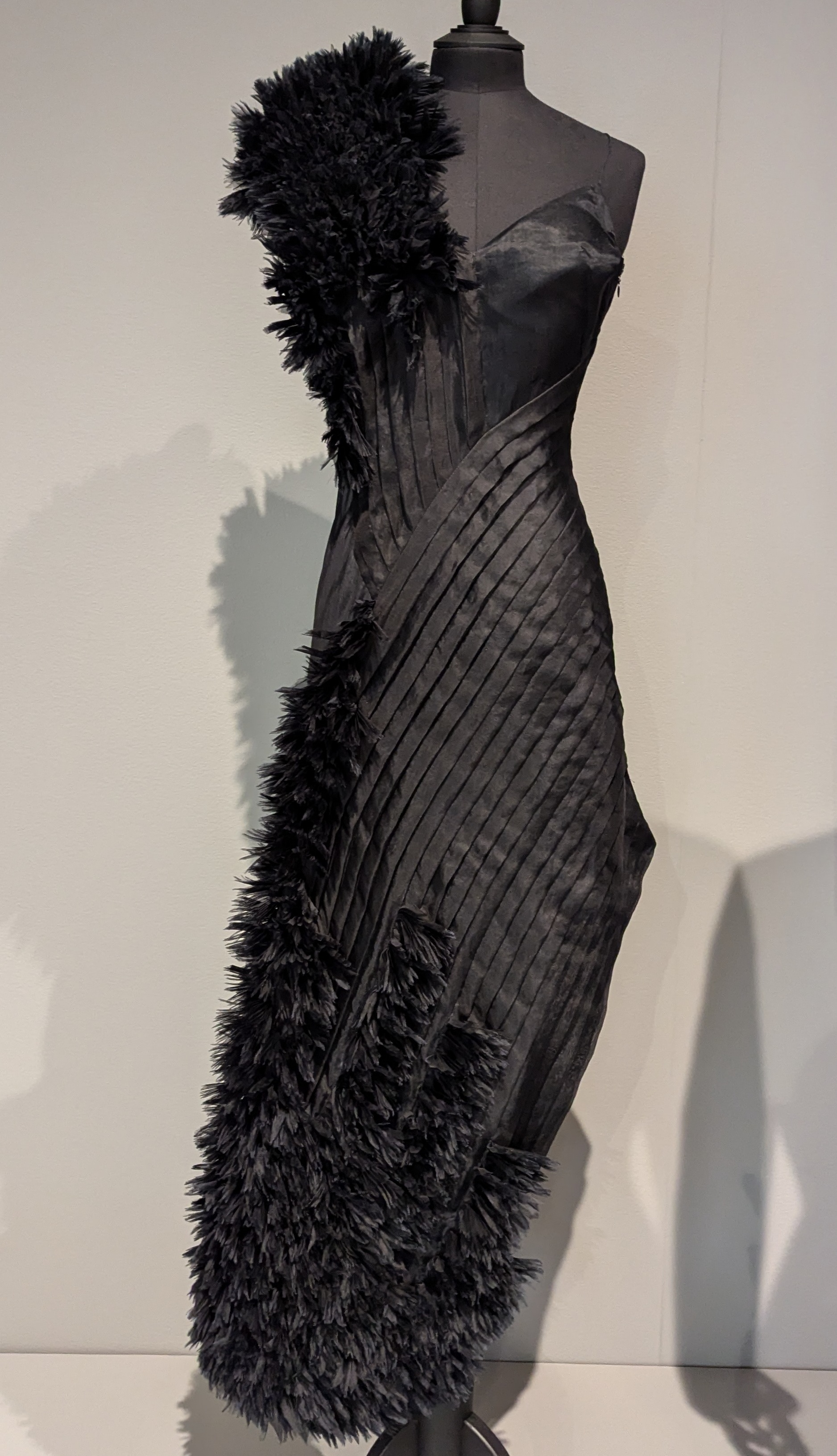
Look 2 at Lee Alexander McQueen & Ann Ray - Rendez-Vous (2024)

Voss (Spring/Summer 2001), stylised in all capitals and sometimes informally called the "asylum show", is the seventeenth collection McQueen created for his eponymous fashion house. McQueen intended it as a critique of the fashion industry in several ways, framing it as a "mental asylum" in which designers were treated like lab animals to be observed and harassed. The unusual designs and materials were intended to challenge conventional ideas about what could be seen as beautiful.

The palette mainly comprised muted tones: white, grey, beige, light green, and soft pink, as well as black and flourishes of red. McQueen said he sought to make a collection that would be broadly palatable at retail, so he included stylish suits and "simple black dresses". Many items had pintucks and ruffles. Another repeated motif was faux-"Oriental" fashion, which appeared in the form of roundels stylised like chrysanthemum flowers, a grey ensemble with Asian-inspired embroidery, and the use of an antique Japanese silk wall screen. These items also exemplified McQueen's love of traditional handicrafts like embroidery. A half-completed jigsaw puzzle of a castle used as a top and a model sandcastle worn as a shoulder-piece provided a touch of surrealism.

The collection is named for Voss, a Norwegian district well-known as a wildlife habitat; accordingly, McQueen made extensive use of unconventional natural materials for the clothing. Most prominently, Voss features garments covered in the shells of razor clams, mussels, and oysters. Some four thousand seashells were sourced from beaches on the coast of Norfolk, with the rest coming from Billingsgate Fish Market in London. McQueen's love of birds was represented in feathered skirts, avian-themed embroidery, and a dress made with taxidermied hawks positioned as though attacking the model.

Equally, the collection drew on the aesthetics of madness, imprisonment, and medicine. McQueen was a cinemaphile and may have been drawing on cinematic depictions of insane asylums and prisons, such as those from One Flew Over the Cuckoo's Nest (1975), set in an asylum, or The Green Mile (1999), which depicted inmates on death row. Vermillion accents evoked blood; one dress, modelled by Erin O'Connor, had a bodice made from microscope slides painted red. Some items may have been referencing nurse's uniforms.

There was a heavy emphasis on tailored items with reimagined menswear elements, such as Look 13, a bodysuit modelled on a suit jacket, or Look 20, an off shoulder dress whose upper bodice was made to look like a man's dress shirt and collar. Several items had halter tops structured like attached neckties; sometimes the entire garment was made from the type of silk fabric typically used for ties. Textile curators Clarissa M. Esguerra and Michaela Hansen identified this style as an example of McQueen's clever "deconstruction of form and function".

=== Showpiece ensembles ===
Voss had the real feel of a mind collecting things. Lee wasn't scared of an idea coming from anywhere. One day he came in with handfuls of mussel shells, and he said, "We're going to make a dress out of this." Another day, he said, "Get a student to buy a jigsaw." Then a week later, he went to his house in Fairlight, on the East Sussex coast, and came back with razor-clam shells and said, "We're going to make a dress out of these."

— Sarah Burton, quoted in Alexander McQueen: Savage Beauty exhibition catalogue

Voss included a large number of showpiece ensembles: elaborate designs meant to convey the idea of a collection and never intended for mass production.

The razor clam dress worn in Look 33 was created from approximately 1,200 razor clam shells. They were chemically stripped and re-varnished, then drilled and sewn to the canvas base with monofilament. McQueen was inspired to create the dress after seeing thousands of the shells on the coast of Norfolk while walking with a friend.

Look 63 is a feathered minidress with a conical silhouette which thrusts forward in the front, styled on the runway with a pair of light pink mules with industrial screws for heels by Benoit Méléard. Fashion theorist Harold Koda identifies this style, which completely obscures the waist, as highly unusual in shape for Western fashion.

Look 65 is a dress made from the Japanese screen, embroidered with flowers and birds, worn over an underdress of oyster shells. McQueen purchased the screen at the Saint-Ouen flea market in Paris. After shipping it back to London, he cut it off its frame and fused the crumbling fabric to cotton and silk to stabilise its shape. He hand-sewed the majority of the dress himself, with minimal pleating or-reshaping so as to properly display the workmanship of the original item. Its shape may have been modelled on kimono or the hanbok; traditional Japanese and Korean garments, respectively. The motifs and colours of the embroidery in this screen inspired similar embroidery for the dress and hat of Look 10. Look 65 was worn on the runway with a neckpiece of silver and Tahitian black pearl by Shaun Leane. The neckpiece had pointed silver branches which curled up and over the model's neck and face, forcing her to hold her head carefully so as to not be spiked.

Look 74 featured a hand-painted corset in red Venetian glass; Look 75 had a headpiece in the same glass. The corset was probably based on a body cast of Laura Morgan, McQueen's house model, who wore it on the runway. Glass production was handled by Columbia Glassworks of London. Theorist Caroline Evans noted that wearing the corset took a certain degree of courage, writing that a "model in a glass corset knows she cannot afford to fall".

The medical slide dress from Look 76 took six weeks of work to complete. Two thousand microscope slides, hand-painted red, were sewn onto the bodice of the dress. In an interview, McQueen said that the glass was meant to evoke a body being studied under a microscope. The slides were red because, in his words, "there's blood beneath every layer of skin".

=== Concept for finale ===
Michelle Olley in the Voss finale

Sanitarium (1983), the Joel-Peter Witkin photograph on which the finale is based

McQueen was interested in challenging societal norms of beauty with Voss. He wanted to show that things conventionally considered ugly, such as moths or an obese woman, "could be beautiful depending on perception". He told Women's Wear Daily that "It was about trying to trap something that wasn't conventionally beautiful to show that beauty comes from within." He had been fat-shamed by the media and was well aware of what it would mean to present a fat, nude woman onstage at a fashion show, where the ideal body is tall and slim. The final visual was a recreation of "Sanitarium", a 1983 photograph by Joel-Peter Witkin. McQueen's version added several hundred moths fluttering around Olley.

Underground journalist Michelle Olley knew McQueen through mutual friends, and was recruited for the finale by his associate Sidonie Barton. Given McQueen's bent for the macabre, and aware of the way her body departed from the fashionable ideal – Olley described herself as "five foot three inches and the wrong side of a size 16 dress" – she anticipated being asked to perform a "visceral she-beast role". Although she had appeared in nude photographs before, Olley was apprehensive about being naked in a live setting while wearing a full-face hood. After some consideration, she agreed to appear, telling McQueen "I'm doing it for art". He replied "I thought we all were weren't we?" before awkwardly leaving the room. Olley's boyfriend felt she was being exploited, but Olley felt "a cheeky little buzz" from the idea of horrifying the fashion audience with her fatness, and ultimately concluded that she wanted "to be part of a ritual, however elegantly disguised".

== Runway show ==
=== Production details ===
The runway show for Voss was staged on 26 September 2000 at the Gatliff Road Warehouse in London, as part of London Fashion Week. The many showpiece designs and complex set, which took an entire week to construct, made for an expensive show. Production was supported by longtime sponsor American Express and reportedly cost £70,000 (US$110,000).

McQueen typically worked with a consistent creative team for his shows, which he planned with Katy England, his assistant and primary stylist. Voss was produced by Gainsbury & Whiting, with art direction by Joseph Bennett, lighting by Dan Landing, and music by DJ John Gosling. Some shoes were created by Benoit Méléard. Hair was styled by Guido Palau, makeup by Val Garland. The moths for the finale were provided by a husband-and-wife team of entomologists.

Both of McQueen's parents attended the show. Other well-known attendees included McQueen's mentor Isabella Blow, actress Gwyneth Paltrow, musician Grace Jones, photographer Nick Knight, gallerist Jay Jopling, jeweller Jade Jagger, artists Tracey Emin, Sam Taylor-Johnson, and Jake and Dinos Chapman, and celebrity couple Ronnie Wood and Jo Wood. Victoria Beckham, then still best known as "Posh Spice" of the girl group Spice Girls, was denied entry. McQueen explained that he preferred to only allow celebrity guests with whom he had a working relationship.

=== Staging ===
[In Voss] the idea was to turn people's faces on themselves. I wanted to turn it around and make them think, am I actually as good as what I'm looking at?

— Alexander McQueen, The Fashion, Spring/Summer 2001

As with The Overlook (Autumn/Winter 1999) three seasons before, Voss was staged inside a room-sized glass cube, with the audience seated outside of it on bleachers. At the outset, the lights were low and the cube functioned as a mirror. McQueen deliberately started the show an hour late, which forced the audience to watch themselves uncomfortably in the mirror while the sounds of a heartbeat and heavy breathing played. (Note: While the delay was planned, its length may have been unexpectedly extended as a result of actress Gwyneth Paltrow arriving late due to traffic.) Some in the front row tore holes in their invitations to turn them into makeshift face shields. McQueen watched the crowd's discomfort from a CCTV monitor, later declaring that turning their gaze back onto themselves was "a great thing to do in the fashion industry". Journalist Maureen Callahan described the mirror stunt as McQueen's act of vengeance against the fashion press, which had often criticised him for his looks.

When the show started, bright lights came up inside the cube, revealing a space designed to look like an observation room in a stereotypical mental asylum, with white tiled floors, padded walls, and one-way mirrors on the walls preventing the models from seeing the audience. At the centre of the room was a box made from darkened glass. Despite the visual resemblance to a padded cell, McQueen said he intended it to be "like the models were in the privacy of their own bedrooms and could do what they wanted".

=== Models and styling ===
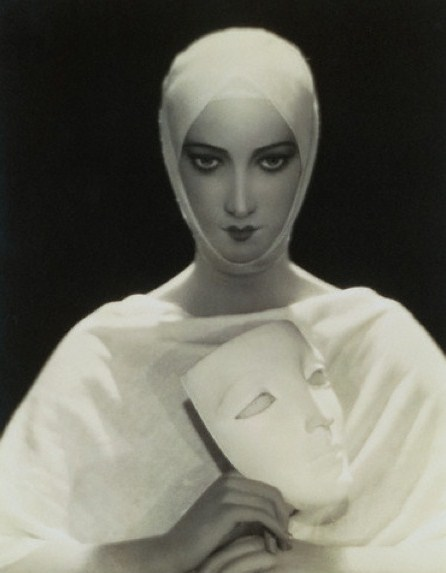
Advertisement for Elizabeth Arden cosmetics by Adolph de Meyer, 1927

The styling made the models look unwell, like hospital patients recovering from operations. The clothing de-emphasised the models' breasts and femininity. Some looks were styled with bandages wrapped around limbs. Makeup was used to make skin look pale and unhealthy. Hair was covered with tightly wound bandages, as though the models had just had brain surgery. The lack of visible hair also meant that the focus was primarily on the looks rather than the models. Fashion historian Judith Watt felt the head wraps were reminiscent of close-fitting medieval caps called coifs. She wrote that the makeup produced "a look of scrubbed purity" that reminded her of the Johannes Vermeer painting Girl with a Pearl Earring (c. 1665). Curator Susanna Brown thought the bandages were a reference to a 1927 Elizabeth Arden advertisement photographed by Adolph de Meyer, which features a model wearing similar white head wrappings.

Models were directed to act as though they were having a "nervous breakdown" while walking. Erin O'Connor, who wore the razor clam dress, recalled him providing detailed directions to this effect: "So, you're in a lunatic asylum, I need you to go mental, have a nervous breakdown, die, and then come back to life. And if you can, do that in three minutes and just follow the crescendo of the music." McQueen told some of the women wearing shell garments, including O'Connor, to purposefully destroy them on the runway.

=== Catwalk presentation ===
The show lasted fifteen minutes. Thirty-two models presented seventy-six looks, including a large number of showpiece ensembles. Following McQueen's directions, the models imitated madness by staggering around the space, stopping randomly in their tracks, and pressing themselves against the mirrors. Kate Moss opened the show in a ruffled cream-coloured knee-length dress, to the sound of "Dooms Night" (1999) by Azzido Da Bass. A series of asymmetrical dresses with black ruffles followed, then tailored suits in pale colours and black. The first showpiece item was Look 10, an embroidered grey jacket with matching rectangular hat and real green amaranthus attached. The arms were sewn to the jacket in the manner of a straitjacket.

Suits, denim, and halter tops with built-in ties followed. Jade Parfitt came out wearing Look 24, the next showpiece, which was inspired by Hitchcock's The Birds. The ensemble comprised a dress with an ostrich-feather skirt and taxidermy hawks attached at the shoulders, appearing to swoop down on her face. Look 28, a jacket with a thermal image of McQueen's face worn with a green ostrich-feather dress, was bookended on either side by suits and other tailored ensembles.

The shells had outlived their usefulness on the beach, so we put them to another use on a dress. Then Erin [O'Connor] came out and trashed the dress, so their usefulness was over once again. Kind of like fashion, really.

— Alexander McQueen, "The McQueen chronicles", Women's Wear Daily, 28 September 2000

The lights temporarily dropped to blue for O'Connor in Look 33, the razor clam dress; she paused to rip shells out and toss them to the floor. Her hands were badly cut, but she was so deeply in character that she did not notice until she left the runway. When she went backstage afterwards, McQueen apologised, alarmed, then took O'Connor's hands and smeared the blood all over her head bandages to coordinate with her next look, a dress covered in microscope slides painted red.

Next were suits and dresses; these were mainly commercial, although one look featured a half-assembled jigsaw puzzle for a top, while another had a model sandcastle attached at the shoulder. A run of mussel-covered pieces appeared next. More tailored items followed, incorporating faux-Oriental embroidery and chrysanthemum motifs. This culminated in Look 65, a dress made from an antique Japanese screen with an underdress of oyster shells, paired with a neckpiece of silver and Tahitian black pearl by McQueen's regular jeweller Shaun Leane. The model, Karen Elson, stopped by the glass to nibble on its metal spikes. Elson tripped coming off the runway, cutting her neck and narrowly avoiding a more serious injury.

A series of tailored items followed, mostly in black with silver accessories. Look 74 featured a hand-painted corset in red Venetian glass worn by Laura Morgan; Look 75 had a headpiece in the same glass. Morgan recalled it as "the most terrifying piece to wear" because the tightness of her skirt made it difficult for her to move her legs. The show's final look was Look 76, the medical slide dress with red ostrich-feather skirt, also worn by O'Connor.

=== Finale ===
During the show, Olley waited within the glass box, which was fitted with a hidden microphone so she could communicate in case of an emergency. She wore a grey full-face mask connected to a breathing tube, with earphones to allow the production team to give her updates. Splatters of white paint all over it evoked bird droppings, so that the mask would look like a stone statue. Although breathing through the mask's nose-holes was not difficult, the tiny eye-holes severely restricted Olley's vision. The live moths were kept in a net bag, which Olley cut open with a scalpel on cue to free them. The box was kept cold to keep the moths dormant until the end. A robe and shoes were hidden within the box for Olley to use after the show.

After the models had departed the stage, the lights went down briefly and the heartbeat that had underpinned the soundtrack faded into the sound of a flatlining heart monitor. The walls of the glass box fell from the metal frame and shattered, revealing Olley lying nude on a chaise longue made from cow horns and draped with lace. Several hundred moths fluttered around her, and a large number of dead moths were glued to her skin. After a few moments, the models came out for their final turn, with Olley still waiting in the box. Elson, despite her near-disaster, insisted on wearing the spiked necklace for the final walk. The debris on the floor made it too dangerous for her to take off her shoes, so McQueen walked with her, holding her hand, to keep her steady.

== Reception ==
=== Contemporary ===
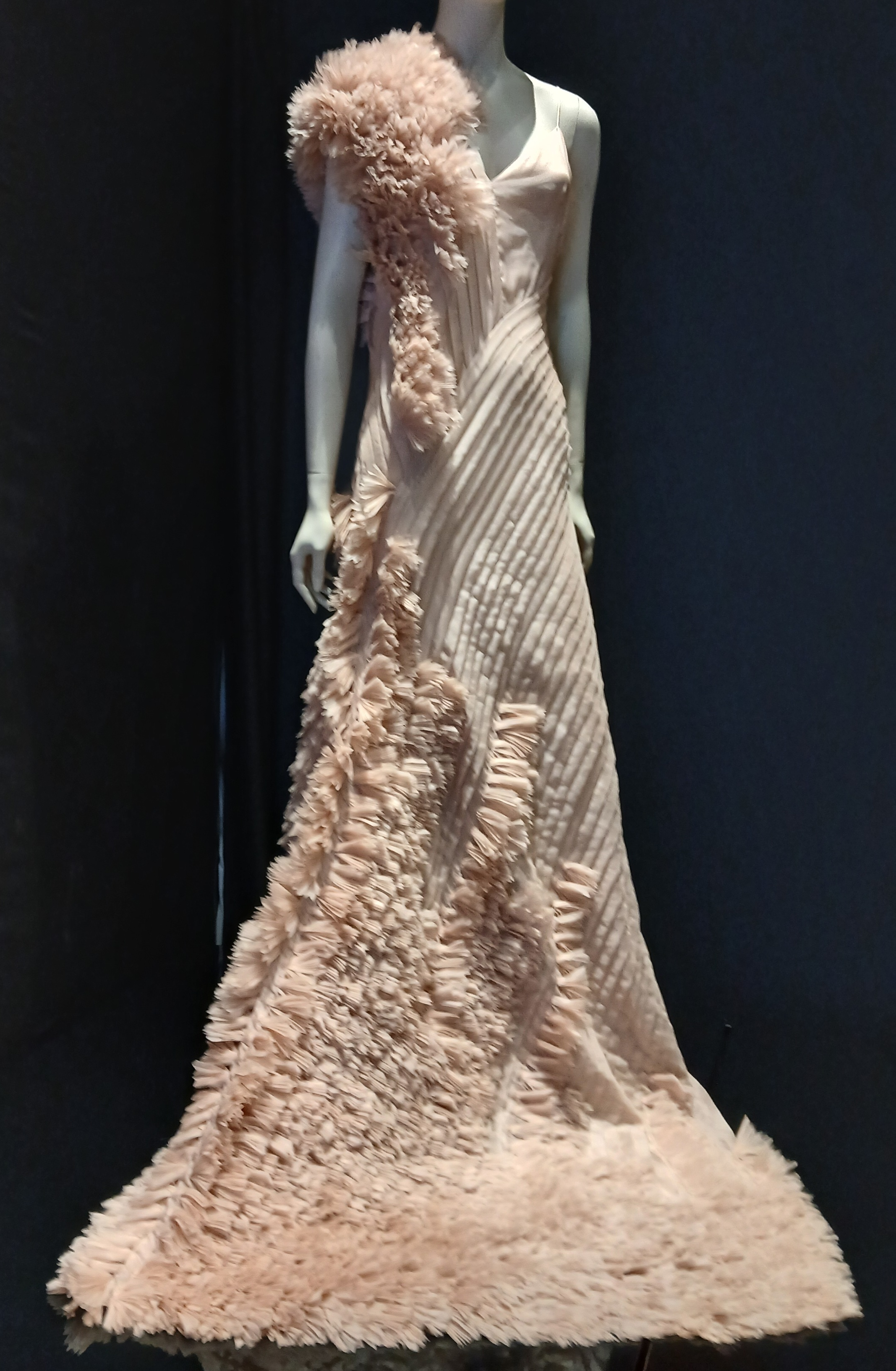
Look 5 at the exhibit accompanying the House of McQueen play, 2025

Contemporary critical response to Voss was universally positive, according to retrospective summaries. Several reviewers called it his best work yet, and many regarded McQueen and fellow designer Hussein Chalayan as the two standouts of a disappointing London Fashion Week. Cathy Horyn of The New York Times went so far as to say theirs were the only two collections that mattered that season. The Globe and Mail reviewer Alexia Economou felt that both men had managed to be on-trend for the season while maintaining their own "immutable" styles.

Reviewers praised the combination of artistic showmanship with wearable, commercially-viable clothing. The slim tailored suits and draped jersey dresses were critical favourites highlighted in a number of reviews, as was the soft colour palette. Suzy Menkes of the International Herald Tribune felt the collection had a sense of "luxurious calm", which she attributed to McQueen now having several years of training in French haute couture techniques at Givenchy. For her, the use of natural materials "suggested the ecological catastrophe of a silent spring". Francesca Fearon at The Irish Times remarked that the tailored designs represented "the madness of modern business". Some felt that the designs, although attractive, did not represent much of a creative advancement for McQueen, although some did not consider this a negative. John Davidson at The Herald of Glasgow felt that the clothing was like much of McQueen's work, with its "sense of confrontational eroticism". Colin McDowell at The Sunday Times was more critical, saying both McQueen and Chalayan had produced clothes that were "worryingly static". He suggested they needed to "keep themselves alert" lest they be outdone by newer, younger designers.

The decision to theme the runway show around insanity polarised critics. Lowthorpe noted that the concept was woven into the entire collection, with each look "play[ing] upon the tension between violence and delicacy". For the National Post, Serena French felt the performance was McQueen's "most complex to date" and suggested he ought to sell tickets to the public for future shows. The staff reviewer for Women's Wear Daily wrote that the unusual theme "could have been a disjointed mess" in the hands of someone less skilled, but felt that the excellence of the designs made it a success. Conversely, Catherine Westwood of The Sun complained that McQueen had "lost the plot" with the theme and finale. McDowell was also critical of McQueen's focus on the runway presentation, saying that the "histrionics of high-camp drama" were less impactful than the designer imagined. Mind, a British charity dedicated to mental health, criticised the theme and staging.

The finale was generally seen as a classic McQueen spectacle. Lisa Armstrong of The Times called it "sublimely sinister". The reviewer for Vogue magazine compared it to the work of several avant-garde artists, saying it was "Francis Bacon via Leigh Bowery and Lucian Freud". Davidson described it as a "fine example of a creative imagination teetering between the compelling and the repulsive, between the merely menacing and the utterly magical".

=== Retrospective ===
In retrospect, Voss is regarded as one of the highlights of McQueen's career. Fashion historian Judith Watt wrote that he had "deftly combined showpieces and set for impact". Author Chloe Fox felt that the showpiece designs lifted the collection from macabre to artistic, crediting the elegance to McQueen's time at Givenchy. Callahan described it as "peerless" and called McQueen "the designer to beat" from that point onward. In his book Blood Beneath the Skin (2015), Andrew Wilson described it as a high point for McQueen, "not so much a fashion show as a fully formed art installation that interrogated attitudes towards beauty and ugliness, sex and death, sanity and madness". Dana Thomas, in her book Gods and Kings (2015), wrote that the show's designs comprised "remarkably handsome and wearable clothes".

I-D magazine, Wonderland magazine, the directors of the 2018 documentary McQueen, and a 2023 L'Officiel USA article have called it one of McQueen's most iconic shows. In a 2015 retrospective, Dazed magazine called Voss one of his darkest. When Vogue asked various designers about their favourite shows by others, in 2024, Simone Rocha and Catherine Holstein each picked Voss. Rocha said she wished she had seen it in person, while Holstein described it as "profoundly brave" and thought it would be impossible to do in the modern fashion industry.

In an overview of the collection from 2021, Cathy Horyn recalled that there were no show notes, so the audience was expected to interpret the themes and ideas for themselves. She felt the show stood out because of McQueen's tailoring abilities: "the workmanship and the expression of sexuality and femininity and all these plays on texture with tailoring that it's just really incredible". To her, Voss was evidence of fashion as art, both in the staging and in the quality of the clothing presented. Horyn suggested that for many people who were involved in fashion at the time and who had seen the show, it "would be in their top five or top ten shows".

== Analysis ==
=== Transgression and beauty ===
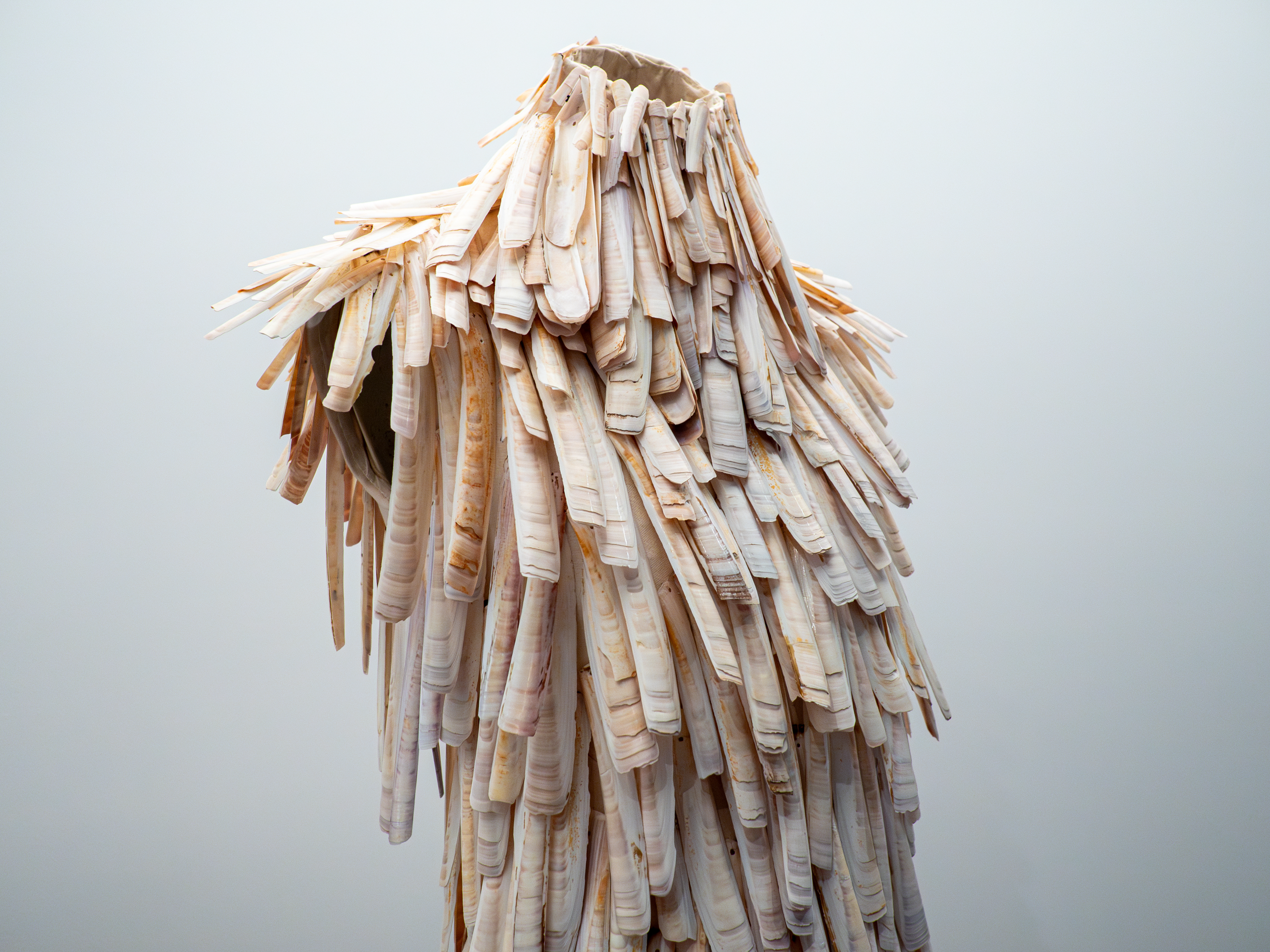
Close-up on razor clamshell dress

The collection, like much of McQueen's work, explored ideas of bodily perfection and interrogated who and what was beautiful. Speaking in 2000, Barbara Atkin, fashion director for Holt Renfrew, felt that McQueen was just one of many designers beginning to subversively reject classical beauty standards. Horyn's review considered Voss in conjunction with Apocalypse: Beauty and Horror in Contemporary Art, an exhibition then running at the Royal Academy of Arts in London. She felt that viewing Apocalypse, with its similar subject matter, made it clear to her that McQueen was not just making fashion, but was "responding, like an artist, to the horror and insanity in contemporary culture".

Art historian Rex Butler argued that McQueen, having successfully turned transgression into fashion with his controversial Highland Rape (Autumn/Winter 1995), had nothing further to transgress upon after that. For the rest of his career, McQueen instead attempted to reveal and critique the inner workings of the fashion industry. Butler called the main elements of Voss – showpiece items made from eclectic materials, mirror trick, and the subversive finale – an "obvious metaphor for the attempt to 'reflect' upon the fashion system". Cultural theologian Robert Covolo cited Voss as evidence of McQueen's career-long ambivalence toward conventional beauty. He saw the juxtaposition between Olley and the conventional models as a statement about how "the attractive power of clothing" contrasted with "the horror, oppression, and insanity that the pursuit of a beautiful body can take". He continued his analysis from a lens of Christian philosophy, arguing that Voss served as a metaphor for futile secular attempts to obtain spiritual fulfilment. In his view, the models in the show seek to gain fulfilment from beauty and fashion, only to be left wanting by an experience that cannot spiritually nourish them.

Academics were interested in McQueen's use of a fashion show, normally a simple vehicle for commercial promotion, for what was ostensibly performance art. Evans called it an example of a "phantasmagoria", a dramatic display that exists to disguise its underlying commercial purpose as something more. She felt that the juxtapositions of beauty and horror in Voss "exemplified the ambivalence" of art and commerce that made something a phantasmagoria: slim models in attractive clothes contrasted with Olley's fat, nude body; the models acting deranged while presenting fashionable clothing; the glass box reflecting the audience and the one containing Olley. Henrique Grimaldi Figueredo made a similar point, arguing that McQueen's shows were "spectacles", which he defined as a fashion show which uses multiple elements to create a commercial performance that borders on art. He identified four aspects from the show which aligned with this framework: the clear theme of hospitalisation and madness; the models styled to look de-sexualised and unhealthy like hospital patients; the mirrored box playing with unhealthy self-reflection; and the finale combining "beauty and horror". Theorist Mélissa Diaby Savané argued that McQueen used ugliness to elevate his designs from mere commerce to genuine artistic expression. In Voss, he achieved this by using imagery of mental illness, unwellness, and obesity to counter normative images of health and beauty, so that the show serves as a reminder of human mortality.

I believe that the idea that we are trapped by our "civilised", socially approved identities is massively important. It causes women so much suffering. Fear of ageing, fear of not being thin enough. Fear of not having the right clothes.

— Michelle Olley, diary entries, 2001

The finale served as the culmination of McQueen's challenge to beauty standards, forcing viewers to confront their preconceptions. Theorists Adam Geczy and Vicki Karaminas argued that the most significant aspect of the finale was its complete absence of actual clothing, which suggested that McQueen had "distilled fashion into its basest elements, being all the intangibles of perception and desire". Wilson considered it to be a partial call-back to the final look from Bellmer La Poupée (Spring/Summer 1997), which featured a model with a large polyhedral structure over her head and body and dozens of moths circling the transparent enclosure. In a paper exploring insects in fashion, entomologist Tierney Brosius argued that the climactic scene from the film Cruella (2021) bore visual and thematic similarities to the Voss finale. In Cruella, moths emerge from a dress secretly made from chrysalises, consuming the fashionable attire of runway show attendees as well as the remainder of the collection. Brosius notes that in both, swarms of moths are released, prompting "the transformation of something beautiful and wondrous into a terrifying nightmare".

=== Materials and styles ===
Many academics have commented on the microscope slide dress. In her 2003 book Fashion at the Edge, Caroline Evans wrote that showpiece items such as the microscope slide dress functioned as elaborate marketing for a designer's ideas, and were therefore examples of how fashion used artistic concepts for capitalist ends. Fashion theorist Jonathan Faiers suggested it was a metaphor for exposing and examining the processes that lie behind the creation of haute couture fashion, which are generally hidden from the general public. The microscope dress has been identified as an example of McQueen's tendency to explore and dichotomise concepts like pleasure and pain or life and death. Fashion historian Ingrid Loschek wrote that the softness of the ostrich feathers on the skirt provides "tactile erotic charm", whereas the microscope slides evoke medical science and its connection to pain and death. Icelandic singer Björk wore the dress once, in concert. Several theorists have remarked that her dancing caused the slides to audibly rattle against one another, transforming it from a garment into a percussion instrument.

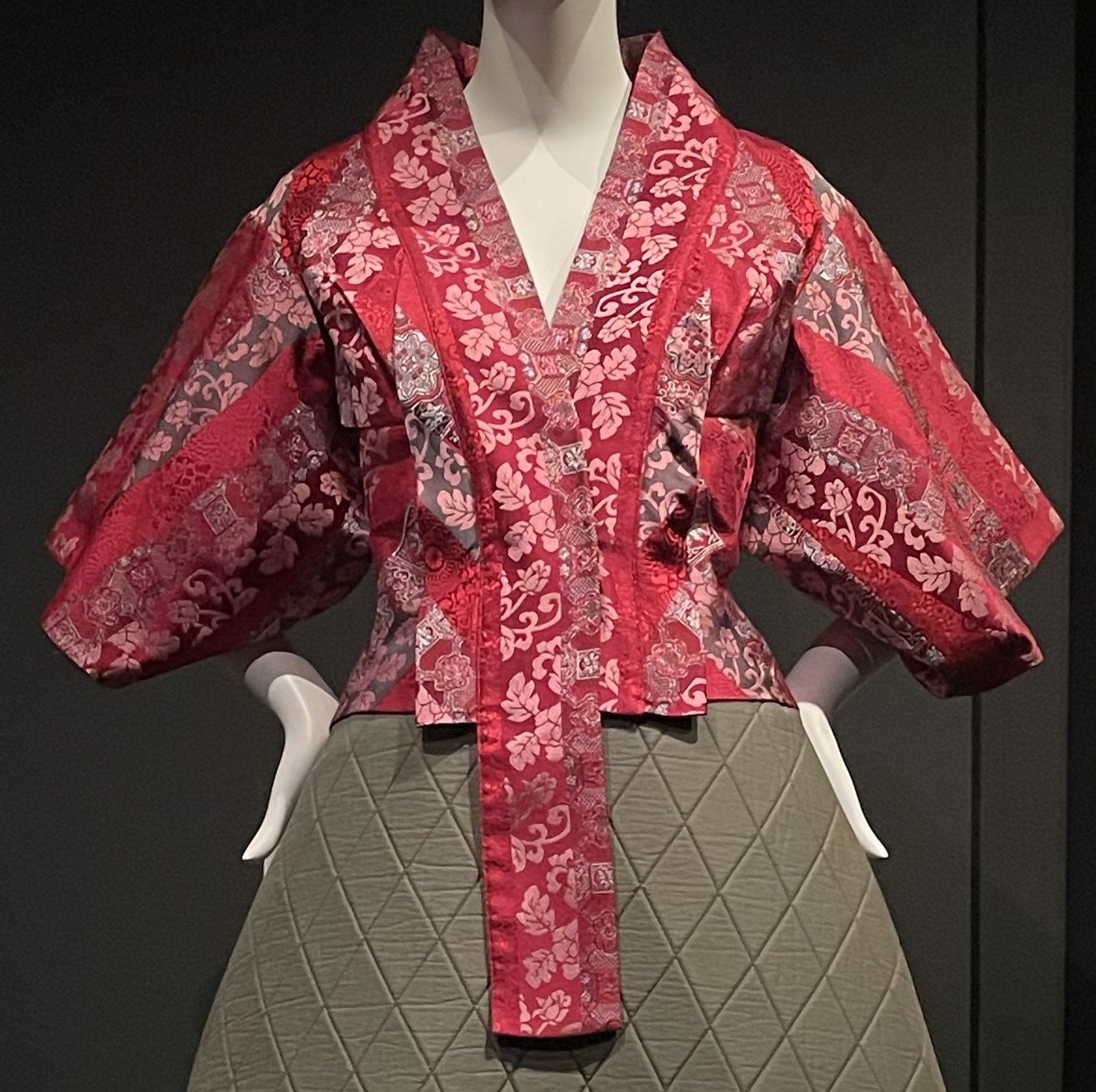
Kimono-inspired jacket from Scanners (Autumn/Winter 2003)

Anna Jackson felt that McQueen's incorporation of elements from Japanese clothing was more "transformative" than similar efforts by other designers, who treated these aesthetics as a novelty. The embroidered straitjacket borrowed several elements from Japanese clothing: "rejection of natural body shape, flat expanses, elaborate sleeves, constricting wrap style and overpowering headpiece". Jackson felt the design showed McQueen's understanding of Japanese garments, as well as how he "transfigured them into something uniquely his own". McQueen's minimal alteration of the antique silk screen "preserved yet metamorphosed" the original work "into a piece of unexpected visual and tactile juxtapositions". McQueen drew on Japanese aesthetics again in Scanners (Autumn/Winter 2003) and It's Only a Game (Spring/Summer 2005). Claire Wilcox thought McQueen made use of the kimono in this and other collections because it could easily be made modern while being grounded in a tradition of "exquisite material and craftsmanship".

Koda compared the feathered minidress from Look 63 to a t-shirt and vest combination by Martin Margiela from 2000 which had a similarly conical silhouette. McQueen's design, he wrote, is a "chimerical pastiche: it is definitely avian, faintly reptilian, and possibly mammalian". Koda describes the heels which were paired with it on the runway as an explicit embodiment of McQueen's "critique of the fashion system", as they have an air of eroticism but were constructed to be very uncomfortable to wear.

Researcher Lisa Skogh noted that McQueen often incorporated concepts and objects which might have appeared in a cabinet of curiosities – collections of natural and historical objects that were the precursor to modern museums. She identified the shell garments from Voss as being in this tradition, writing that they "evoke the [shell] grotto aesthetic of princely gardens" and other historical art objects made from shells.

=== Human-animal hybridisation ===
Theorist Catherine Spooner noted that McQueen frequently used imagery of human-animal hybrids as a mischievous comment "on the notion of fashion as a transformational medium". Fashion historian Gertrud Lehnert suggested that McQueen's use of seashells and animal parts represented the natural duality of mortality and rebirth in his work. She focused on the ambiguity presented by McQueen's half-animal women, wondering if they were transitioning to or from animals. Although they bore some resemblance to mythical bird-women such as sirens and harpies, Lehnert felt that the women in Voss seemed trapped within the glass, endangered themselves rather than presenting a danger to others. Loschek wrote that McQueen's shows presented images from the "subconscious". As an example, she described Olley, in her box, as a "faunlike creature" kept in a test tube.

Some scholars viewed Voss through the analytical lens of "becoming", developed by the French academics Gilles Deleuze and Félix Guattari, which suggests that identity is a constant process of change, and is not bound to fixed ideas. For these analysts, the way the collection presented an apparent hybridisation of humanity with the natural world was an expression of "becoming" something other than human. Gender theorist Stephen D. Seely explored this notion in an essay about fashion which enables "the becoming-nonhuman of the wearer's body" and defies standard binary categories such as "human/animal". For Seely, McQueen's designs achieve this by incorporating aesthetics and materials from nature, with the bird attack dress as a specific example. While the model's upper half seems like it is being torn apart or carried away by the taxidermy hawks, her bottom half, covered in ostrich feathers, is seemingly transformed into a bird. Seely writes that "the model and the birds are becoming-indiscernible", neither one nor the other.

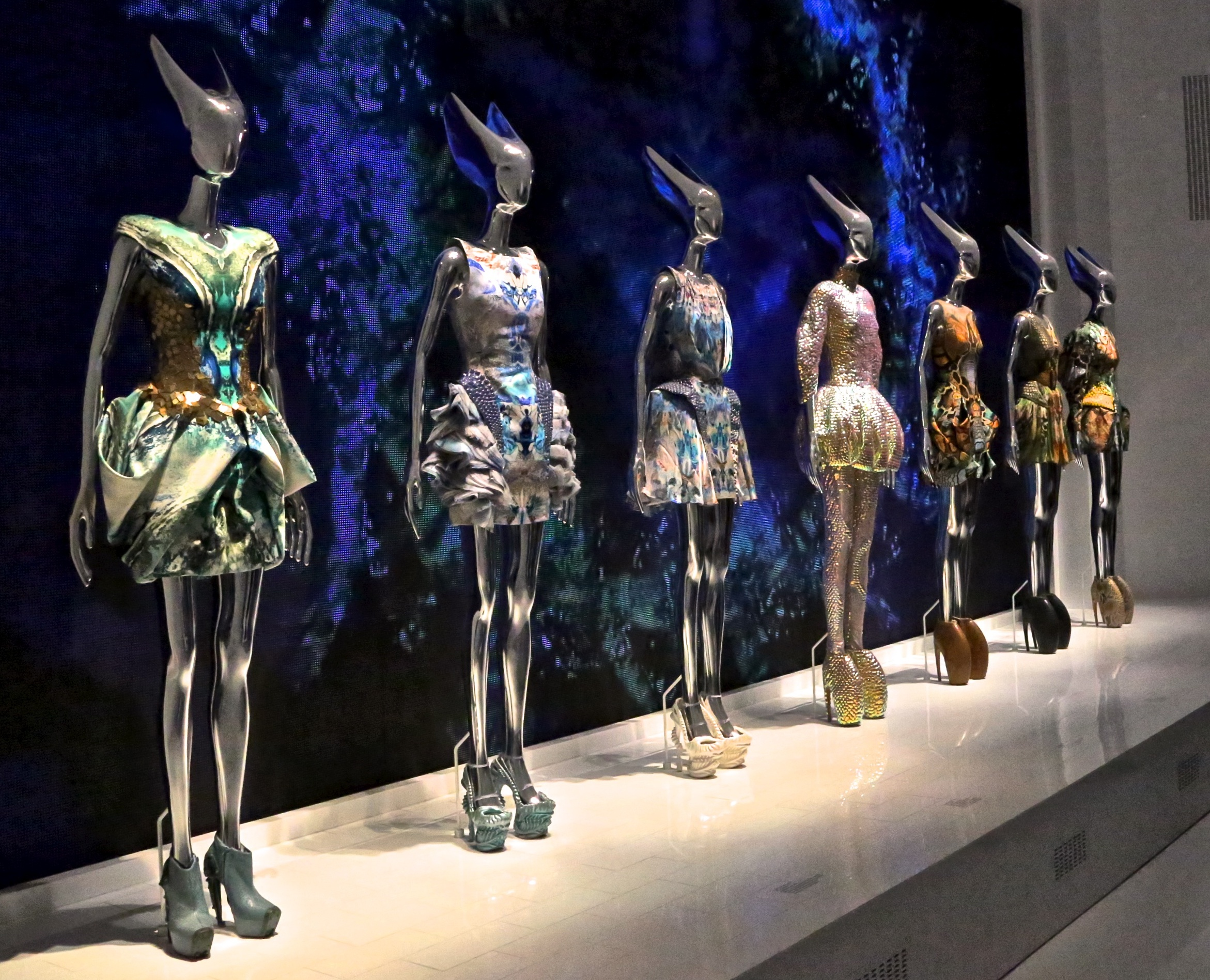
Underwater-inspired designs from Plato's Atlantis on display at Alexander McQueen: Savage Beauty, Victoria and Albert Museum, 2015

Faiers considered "McQueen's work as being in a constant state of 'becoming' something else", citing several examples from Voss. He described a grey silk coat with thermal print, paired with a green feathered dress, as representing the life stages of a butterfly or moth. The furry-looking green feathers and unusual forward-thrust abdomen of the dress resembled a caterpillar in camouflage, while the coat represented the cocoon. Finally, the back of the jacket, with the thermal print of McQueen's face, resembles the eyespot patterns found on mature butterflies. Faiers described this design as "human aposematism, warning potential predators (other designers?) to keep away". He also discussed the hawk dress, comparing it to designs from It's a Jungle Out There which incorporated large animal parts. Although Faiers acknowledges the inspiration from the film The Birds, he asserts that the design is "no simple homage", but an imparting of the various qualities of a hawk into fashion as an attempt to "distill 'birdliness'". Finally, he examined the use of shells, calling them pieces of "something left behind that has served its purpose". In his analysis, the shell items earned significance after they were destroyed by the models wearing them, which represented the models moving forward along an evolutionary path by discarding something no longer necessary. Both Faiers and Spooner commented on the throughline from the shell garments of Voss to the underwater-adapted women of his final full collection, Plato's Atlantis (Spring/Summer 2010).

Theorist Justyna Stępień built on Seely and Faiers to argue that the "assimilation and transformation of the human and natural world" made Voss an example of post-humanist fashion. She focused on McQueen's incorporation of avian imagery into the collection, writing that the "mutation of different elements can be seen as the designer's attempt to understand this process of birds' variation". McQueen's juxtaposition of natural and experimental materials hybridises the human body with plants and animals, "redefining the relationship between fabric and flesh".

=== Mirrored box ===
Fashion theorist Alma Hernandez Hernandez Briseño analysed Voss alongside Bellmer La Poupée, arguing that these shows blurred the line between fantasy and reality. In Voss, the glass cube separating the models from the audience is a fictional space in which McQueen could explore transgressive notions of what beauty and fashion meant. Fashion journalist Alex Fury argued that McQueen's tendency to physically separate the audience from the models evoked cinema and television, offering The Overlook and Voss as examples; in this way, McQueen was expressing himself as a product of the modern, screen-based world. In contrast, author Claire Wilcox raised Voss as an example of McQueen making the audience a part of the performance. She compared the mirrored box, which "subverted" the audience's role as observers, to the staging of Plato's Atlantis, in which cameras on the stage projected the surroundings onto the backdrop, making the audience part of the show.

Evans argued that the impact of the mirror trick came from targeting an audience of fashion industry professionals, whose work typically involved "sharp scrutiny of the models". The reversal forced them to think about their objectification of the model and the clothes. McQueen then pushed the point further by concealing the audience from the models, turning the runway show into a "simulation of solitary pleasure [...] like a sex show", watched by an audience of voyeurs. Conversely, the models' "workaday narcissism" – a basic aspect of their vocation – was made to look "psychotic and dysfunctional". Author Vanessa Guerrera argued a similar point, saying that it was "revolutionary" for McQueen to turn the audience into the subjects. She felt Voss represented McQueen more explicitly referencing elements of horror fiction in his work: "uncomfortable voyeurism, the ugly reflections of the worst parts of us, and the flair for the dramatic".

Design theorists A. Rabàdan and I. Bentz also commented on the mirror reversal, writing that McQueen had created a "non-place" by staging the show in the cube of mirrors, detaching it from reality to create "a conflict in the spectator of the performative runway". They likened the spectators and models to Narcissus of Greek myth: a young man who fell in love with his own reflection. Both spectators and models were forced to do so in the context of Voss.

== Aftermath and legacy ==
=== Models' experiences ===
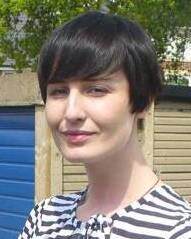
Erin O'Connor, who wore the razor clam and microscope slide dresses; pictured in 2008

Olley detailed her experience in her diary. She described the sight of the moths flying around her as "unworldly and exciting", and the confinement as a "strange little bubble of time". Having spent four hours in the mask, and three in the box, she cried with relief when she finally got backstage. McQueen was delighted by the result, and called Olley "the star of the show". Blow, too, congratulated her after the show, as did a French representative from Elle. In a 2015 interview with Dazed, Olley said she was glad to have done the show, and that it made her feel brave. Speaking to SHOWstudio that same year, she discussed feeling as though her performance had been "part of an act of magic".

O'Connor has discussed her experiences in Voss in several interviews, saying that walking in Voss helped her define why she loved being a model. According to her, McQueen was unique in giving his models freedom to develop a character for his shows. For Voss, she developed a separate persona for each of her outfits. In the shell dress, she described her character as "in charge of my illness [...] I was breaking free". For the microscope slide dress, she felt she embodied "the fragility of a human being and a woman possessed", which changed the way she moved. She recalled McQueen spontaneously directing her to destroy the clamshell dress just before she went out. Although briefly uncertain, she found herself falling into the performance: "I did exactly as I was told and I had worried that it looked like in some way that I was victimized or a victim of being, you know, sort of in that mindset, and actually it was the complete opposite. It was stripping away the pain, and the armour, and going 'here I am'." She recalled McQueen improvising with the blood backstage as a moment of artistry that gave "a glimpse of the man" that McQueen was. Although the experience was extreme, she was pleased that McQueen had "pushed" her to perform at what she felt was a higher level.

Photographer Nick Knight interviewed Karen Elson, who wore the thorned neckpiece, in 2015. She recalled it as "terrifyingly dangerous", telling Knight that she had cut her neck quite badly during her fall, and saying she was surprised not to have lost an eye. Elson was not skilled at walking in high heels, and hers were especially slender, leading to her losing her balance. There was a stunned silence, broken by Val Garland saying "oh my god, I thought you were dead". Because it was a McQueen show, Elson said, "we laughed it off within two minutes". She described McQueen holding her throughout the final walk "so tenderly" to make sure she did not fall again.

Vogue magazine interviewed several McQueen models for their February 2020 issue, two of whom discussed Voss specifically. Jade Parfitt, who wore the bird attack outfit, remembered Voss as an unusual experience for the models. Compared to normal shows, in which models could "feed off the music and the audience", Voss was an exercise in sensory deprivation, where "all you had was your mirror image and silence and the knowledge that there were hundreds of audience members beyond the glass". Laura Morgan, McQueen's house model, described how McQueen subverted notions of beauty: "He introduced you to characters that were wild, mysterious, weird, ugly, insane." She cited the Voss finale as an example of McQueen striking out at the fashion industry for its monotonous presentations: "No pretty girls walking down a white runway here."

=== Museum appearances ===
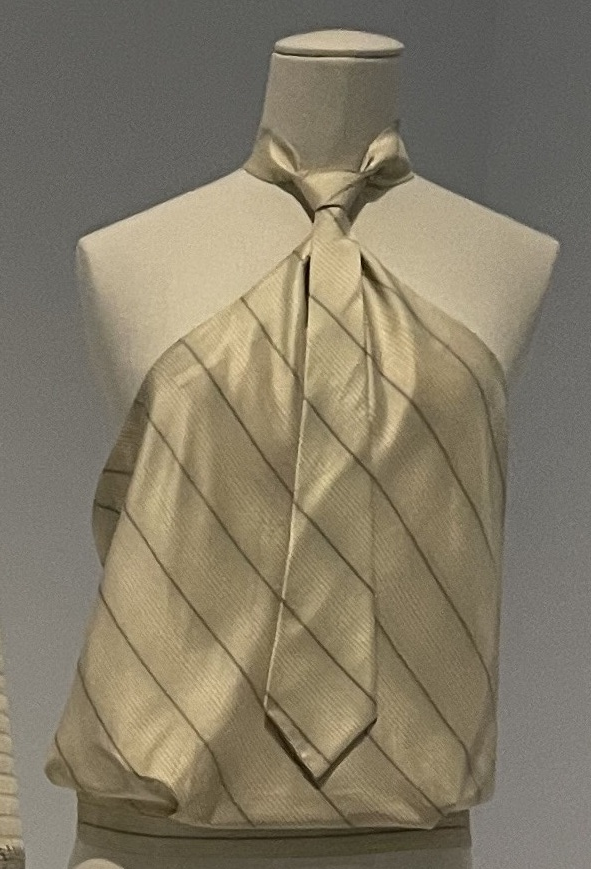
Blouse with necktie halter top from Voss presented at Lee Alexander McQueen: Mythos, Mind, Muse at Musée des beaux-arts du Québec

For Radical Fashion, a 2001 exhibition at the Victoria and Albert Museum (the V&A), McQueen recreated the padded cell from Voss on a smaller scale. Items featured included the microscope slide dress, the McQueen face jacket, and several of the chrysanthemum dresses.

Many items from Voss appeared in the exhibition Alexander McQueen: Savage Beauty, courtesy of the Alexander McQueen brand except as noted: the embroidered grey "straitjacket" with matching hat; the dress with taxidermy birds; the thermal image jacket with green dress; the razor clam dress; a coat and dress with chrysanthemum roundels; the Japanese screen dress with silver and black pearl neckpiece; and the microscope slide dress. The chrysanthemum coat was paired with a black dress loaned by McQueen's friend Trino Verkade. At the original 2011 staging at the Metropolitan Museum of Art (the Met), the microscope slide dress was placed in the Romantic Gothic section of the show, while the rest of the items were placed in the Romantic Exoticism section, in a recreation of the Radical Fashion display. The Cabinet of Curiosities, which held accessories, had several from Voss: a bodice of mussel shells, the corset backplate and headpiece in red glass, and a pair of shoes in tan leather and metal loaned by socialite Daphne Guinness.

For the 2015 staging of Savage Beauty at the V&A in London, the items from Voss were placed at the end of the exhibition, again in the mirrored room from Radical Fashion and the 2011 staging. A film of the finale played in place of the living tableau. The razor clam dress had to be transported from New York City to London pre-placed on a fibreglass mannequin due to its weight, fragility, and the difficulty involved in mounting it. The ten-step process of preparing the dress for travel involved padding the dress at potential contact points, stuffing tissue between every layer of shell, attaching further padding, and securing the mannequin inside the crate. The dress made it to London and back without issue. Due to the noticeable damage that occurred during the runway show, reproduction shells made from paper were inserted to cover spots where original shells fell off. The reproductions were made by printing photographs of original shells, then cutting and curling them to the desired shape before attaching them to the dress base.

One item from Voss appeared in the 2022 exhibition Lee Alexander McQueen: Mythos, Mind, Muse, a retail variant of several halter-top looks from the runway show. The razor clam dress appeared at the Met's Sleeping Beauties: Reawakening Fashion (2024), accompanied by a recording of the sound made by the dress when worn. Reviewer Cathy Horyn called the sound "off the charts", but questioned its educational utility. The Alexander McQueen brand loaned the microscope slide dress to the Met for the 2026 exhibition Costume Art.

=== Ownership ===
The Alexander McQueen brand archive retains ownership of the microscope slide dress; the embroidered grey "straitjacket" with matching hat; the dress with taxidermied birds; the thermal image jacket with green dress; a coat with chrysanthemum roundels from separate looks; and the Japanese screen dress with silver and black pearl neckpiece. The Met owns the razor clam dress and another unspecified dress, both gifted by the brand in 2014. The V&A owns a grey jacket with chrysanthemum-embroidered sash from the retail collection. The

== Bibliography ==
=== Audio-visual media ===
- Alexander McQueen | Women's Spring/Summer 2001 | Runway Show. Alexander McQueen. 12 March 2012 – via YouTube.
- Horyn, Cathy (21 May 2021). "Cathy Horyn: Alexander McQueen S/S 01". SHOWstudio.
- Knight, Nick (6 August 2014). "Interview: Erin O'Connor on Alexander McQueen". SHOWstudio. Archived from the original on 30 July 2024.
- Knight, Nick (11 February 2015). "Interview: Karen Elson on Alexander McQueen". SHOWstudio.
- Stoppard, Lou (20 March 2015). "Interview: Michelle Olley on Lee McQueen". SHOWstudio.

=== Books ===
- Birringer, Johannes; Danjoux, Michèle (2019). "Sound and Wearables". In Filimowicz, Michael (ed.). Foundations in Sound Design for Embedded Media: A Multidisciplinary Approach. New York City: Routledge. pp. 243–274. ISBN 978-1-351-60388-1.
- Bolton, Andrew (2011). Alexander McQueen: Savage Beauty. New York City: Metropolitan Museum of Art. ISBN 978-1-58839-412-5. OCLC 687693871.
- Butler, Rex (2022). "Rei Kawakubo: Fashion Degree Zero". Rei Kawakubo: For and Against Fashion. London: Bloomsbury Visual Arts. pp. 209–230. ISBN 978-1-350-11823-2.
- Callahan, Maureen (2014). Champagne Supernovas: Kate Moss, Marc Jacobs, Alexander McQueen, and the '90s Renegades Who Remade Fashion. New York City: Touchstone Books. ISBN 978-1-4516-4053-3.
- Esguerra, Clarissa M.; Hansen, Michaela (2022). Lee Alexander McQueen: Mind, Mythos, Muse. New York City: Delmonico Books. ISBN 978-1-63681-018-8. OCLC 1289986708.
- Evans, Caroline (2003). Fashion at the Edge: Spectacle, Modernity and Deathliness. New Haven, Connecticut: Yale University Press. ISBN 978-0-300-10192-8.
- Fairer, Robert; Wilcox, Claire (2016). Alexander McQueen: Unseen. New Haven, Connecticut: Yale University Press. ISBN 978-0-300-22267-8. OCLC 946216643.
- Fox, Chloe (2012). Vogue On: Alexander McQueen. Vogue on Designers. London: Quadrille Publishing. ISBN 978-1849491136. OCLC 828766756.
- Frankel, Susannah (2001). Visionaries: Interviews With Fashion Designers. London: V&A Publications. ISBN 978-0-8109-6589-8.
- Geczy, Adam; Karaminas, Vicki (2019). Fashion Installation: Body, Space, and Performance. London: Bloomsbury Visual Arts. ISBN 978-1-350-03253-8.
- Gleason, Katherine (2012). Alexander McQueen: Evolution. New York City: Race Point Publishing. ISBN 978-1-61058-837-9. OCLC 783147416.
- Honigman, Ana Finel (2021). What Alexander McQueen Can Teach You About Fashion. London: Frances Lincoln. ISBN 978-0-7112-5906-5.
- Knox, Kristin (2010). Alexander McQueen: Genius of a Generation. London: A&C Black. ISBN 978-1-4081-3223-4. OCLC 794296806.
- Koda, Harold (2001). Extreme Beauty: The Body Transformed. New York City: Metropolitan Museum of Art. ISBN 978-0-300-10312-0.
- Lehnert, Gertrud (2016). "Queere Mode | Körper" [Queer Fashion | Body]. In Lehnert, Gertrud; Weilandt, Maria (eds.). Ist Mode queer?: Neue Perspektiven der Modeforschung [Is Fashion Queer?: New Perspectives in Fashion Research] (in German). Bielefeld, Germany: transcript Verlag. pp. 17–36. ISBN 978-3-8394-3490-1.
- Loschek, Ingrid (2009). When Clothes Become Fashion: Design and Innovation Systems. Oxford: Berg Publishers. doi:10.2752/9781847883681. ISBN 978-0-85785-144-4.
- Picardie, Justine (2005). My Mother's Wedding Dress: The Life and Afterlife of Clothes. New York City: Bloomsbury. ISBN 978-1-59691-880-1.
- Rabàdan, A.; Bentz, I. (2018). "Performative runway in backstage liquidity". In Broega, Ana Cristina; Cunha, Joana; Carvalho, Helder; Blanco, Manuel; García-Badell, Guillermo; Goméz-Chacón, Diana (eds.). Reverse Design: A Current Scientific Vision From the International Fashion and Design Congress. Boca Raton: CRC Press. ISBN 978-0-429-76632-9.
- Thomas, Dana (2015). Gods and Kings: The Rise and Fall of Alexander McQueen and John Galliano. New York City: Penguin Publishing. ISBN 978-1-101-61795-3. OCLC 951153602.
- Watt, Judith (2012). Alexander McQueen: The Life and the Legacy. New York City: Harper Design. ISBN 978-1-84796-085-6. OCLC 892706946.
- Wilcox, Claire, ed. (2015). Alexander McQueen. New York City: Abrams Books. ISBN 978-1-4197-1723-9. OCLC 891618596.
  - Bethune, Kate. "Encyclopedia of Collections". In Wilcox (2015), pp. 303–326.
  - Brown, Susanna. "Nightmares and Dreams". In Wilcox (2015), pp. 284–301.
  - Evans, Caroline. "Modelling McQueen: Hard Grace". In Wilcox (2015), pp. 189–201.
  - Faiers, Jonathan. "Nature Boy". In Wilcox (2015), pp. 123–137.
  - Fury, Alex. "Show, and Tell". In Wilcox (2015), pp. 220–233.
  - Jackson, Anna. "Refashioning Japan". In Wilcox (2015), pp. 116–121.
  - O'Neill, Alistair. "The Shining and Chic". In Wilcox (2015), pp. 261–280.
  - Skogh, Lisa. "Museum of the Mind". In Wilcox (2015), pp. 178–188.
  - Spooner, Catherine. "A Gothic Mind". In Wilcox (2015), pp. 141–158.
  - Townsend, Eleanor. "Memento Mori". In Wilcox (2015), pp. 159–163.
  - Wilcox, Claire. "Plato's Atlantis: Anatomy of a Collection". In Wilcox (2015), pp. 83–103.
- Wilcox, Claire (2017). "Radicalizing the Representation of Fashion: Alexander McQueen at the V&A, 1999–2015". In Brooks, Mary M.; Eastop, Dinah D. (eds.). Refashioning and Redress: Conserving and Displaying Dress. Los Angeles: Getty Conservation Institute. pp. 187–198. ISBN 978-1-60606-511-2.
- Wilcox, Claire (2020). "Kimono Dreams". In Jackson, Anna (ed.). Kimono: Kyoto to Catwalk. London: Victoria and Albert Museum. pp. 269–286. ISBN 9781851779925. OCLC 1109797332.
- Wilson, Andrew (2015). Alexander McQueen: Blood Beneath the Skin. New York City: Simon and Schuster. ISBN 978-1-4767-7674-3. OCLC 1310585849.

=== Journals ===
- Birringer, Johannes (2016). "Performance In the Cabinet of Curiosities: Or, The Boy Who Lived in the Tree". PAJ: A Journal of Performance and Art. 38 (3): 27–28. doi:10.1162/PAJJ_a_00331. ISSN 1520-281X. JSTOR 26386804. S2CID 57559845.
- Brosius, Tierney (Fall 2023). "The Insect as Fashion Muse and Provocateur: Angelic Maggots and Subversive Lobsters". American Entomologist. 69 (3): 42–50. doi:10.1093/ae/tmad043. ISSN 1046-2821.
- Covolo, Robert (June 2014). "Beyond the Low-Rise Jean: Traces of Resurrection on the Catwalks of the Late Alexander McQueen". The Other Journal (23: Body). Wipf and Stock Publishers: 30–37. ISBN 978-1-63087-237-3.
- Grimaldi Figueredo, Henrique (20 November 2020). "Performing the Risk: Four Contemporary Obituaries in Alexander McQueen". Conceição/Conception. 9: 1–18. doi:10.20396/conce.v9i00.8659720. ISSN 2317-5737.
- Hernandez Briseño, Alma (11 June 2020). "La Poupee and Voss: Alexander McQueen's heterotopias". The Fashion Studies Journal.
- Kim, Hyun-joo; Kang, Hae-Seung (1 August 2012). "The Design Trend and Identity of Alexander McQueen Based on the Cultural and the Artistic Background of England". Journal of Korean Society of Design Science. 25 (3): 292. S2CID 143075005.
- Mora, Juliana Luna; Berry, Jess (2 September 2022). "Creative Direction Succession in Luxury Fashion: The Illusion of Immortality at Chanel and Alexander McQueen". Luxury. 9 (2–3): 117–140. doi:10.1080/20511817.2022.2194039. ISSN 2051-1817.
- Savané, Mélissa Diaby (20 June 2021). "The Fantasy of Ugliness in Alexander McQueen Collections (1992–2009): How Did Literature and the Visual Arts Inspire Alexander McQueen to Merge Sex and Horror in His Own Art Form?". Revista 2i: Estudos de Identidade e Intermedialidade. 3 (3): 95–108. doi:10.21814/2i.3157. ISSN 2184-7010. Archived from the original on 23 October 2023.
- Seely, Stephen D. (2013). "How Do You Dress a Body Without Organs?: Affective Fashion and Nonhuman Becoming". Women's Studies Quarterly. 41 (1): 247–265. doi:10.1353/wsq.2013.0069. ISSN 1934-1520.
- Stępień, Justyna (3 July 2017). "'Savage Beauties'. Alexander McQueen's Performance of Posthuman Bodies". International Journal of Performance Arts and Digital Media. 13 (2): 170–182. doi:10.1080/14794713.2017.1345584. ISSN 1479-4713.
