= Scanners (collection) =

2003 fashion collection by Alexander McQueen

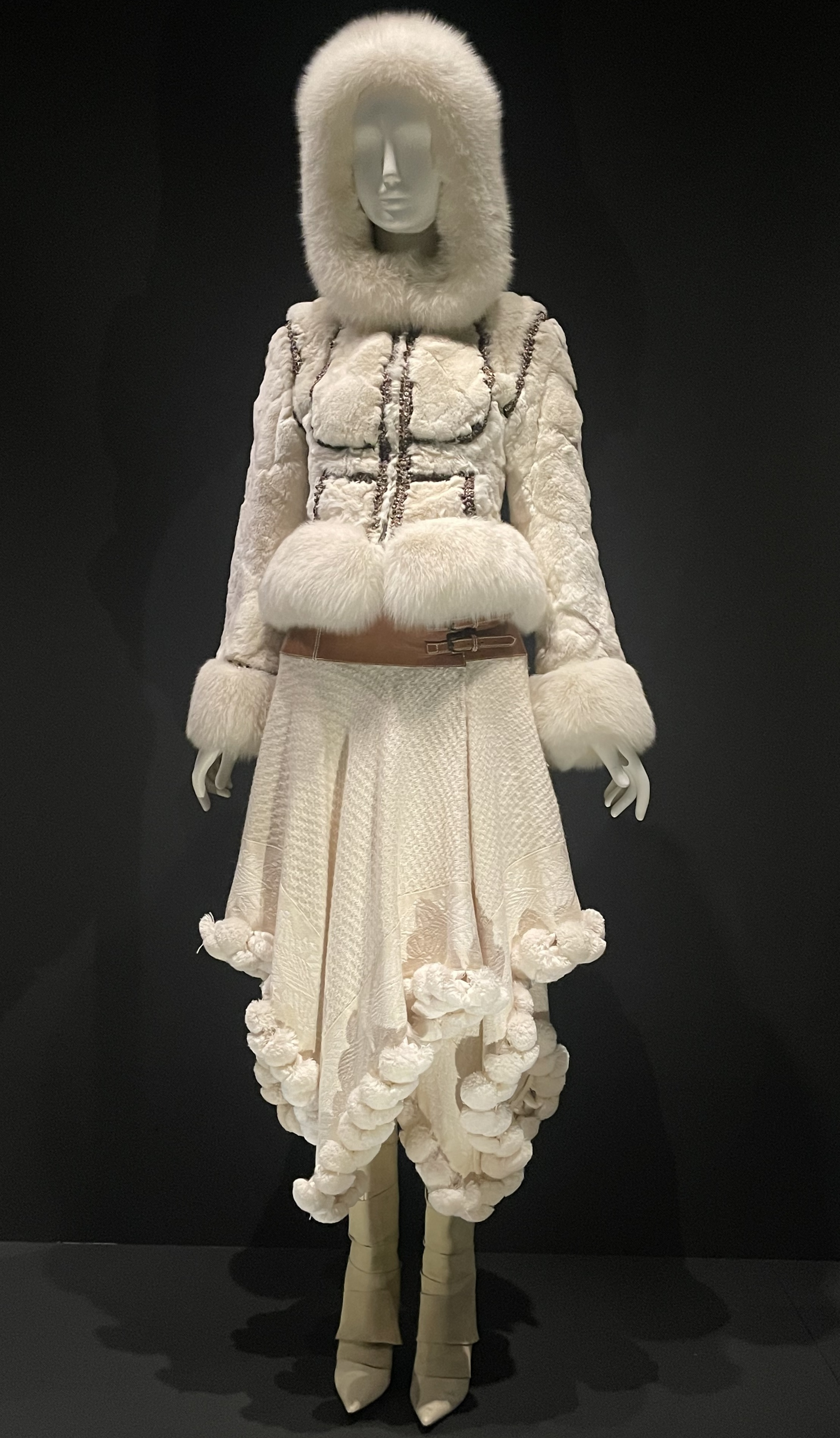
Ensemble from Scanners presented at Lee Alexander McQueen: Mind, Mythos, Muse

Scanners is the twenty-second collection by British fashion designer Alexander McQueen, released for the Autumn/Winter 2003 season of his eponymous fashion house. The collection is based on the idea of exiles travelling eastward through northern Eurasia: Siberia, Tibet, and finally Japan. The designs borrow heavily from the traditional clothing and art of those areas, and reflect an overall aesthetic of luxury, with voluminous silhouettes and rich materials. Cultural motifs include heavy embroidery, traditional patterns, and kimono-like shapes.

The runway show was staged on 8 March 2003 at the Grande halle de la Villette in Paris, with production by McQueen's usual creative team. The set was made to look like a desolate tundra with rocks and snow. A clear plastic wind tunnel was suspended over the runway on industrial scaffolding for some models to walk through. Fifty-nine looks were presented in roughly three stages, representing the journey through each of Siberia, Tibet, and Japan. The show ended with a model struggling through the wind tunnel in an enormous kimono.

Critical reception was mostly positive and sales were reportedly strong. Academic analysis has considered whether McQueen was engaging in cultural appropriation of Asian culture. Items from Scanners have appeared in exhibitions like the retrospective Alexander McQueen: Savage Beauty.

== Background ==
British fashion designer Alexander McQueen was known for his imaginative, sometimes controversial designs. Over the course of his career, which lasted from 1992 until his death in 2010, he explored a broad range of ideas and themes, particularly sexuality, death, violence, romanticism, and historicism. He began as an apprentice on Savile Row, earning a reputation as an expert tailor; later he learned dressmaking as head designer for French fashion house Givenchy. (Note: From October 1996 to October 2001, McQueen was simultaneously head designer at Givenchy and at his own label.) Although he worked in ready-to-wear – clothing produced for retail sale – his showpiece designs featured a degree of craftsmanship that verged on haute couture – extremely high-end custom designs with elaborate handiwork.

McQueen's personal fixations had a strong influence on his designs. He played on visual and thematic contrasts for effect and incorporated his love of nature into his works with visual motifs and organic materials. McQueen was fascinated with Japanese culture and Buddhism. He had referenced Japanese clothing in his previous collection Voss (Spring/Summer 2001) and would do so again in It's Only a Game (Spring/Summer 2005).

His fashion shows were often elaborate to the point of being performance art, and audiences began to expect him to present dramatic spectacles. Previous seasons had seen models drenched with artificial rain (Untitled, Spring/Summer 1998) or trapped in a faux-padded cell (Voss). The set for his Autumn/Winter 1999 collection The Overlook had depicted an isolated winter landscape inspired by the Stanley Kubrick horror film The Shining (1980). Scanners returned to a winter setting, the opposite of the Amazon rainforest inspiration for Irere (Spring/Summer 2003). Although well-received for its designs, Irere had garnered criticism for its largely uneventful show.

== Concept and creative process ==
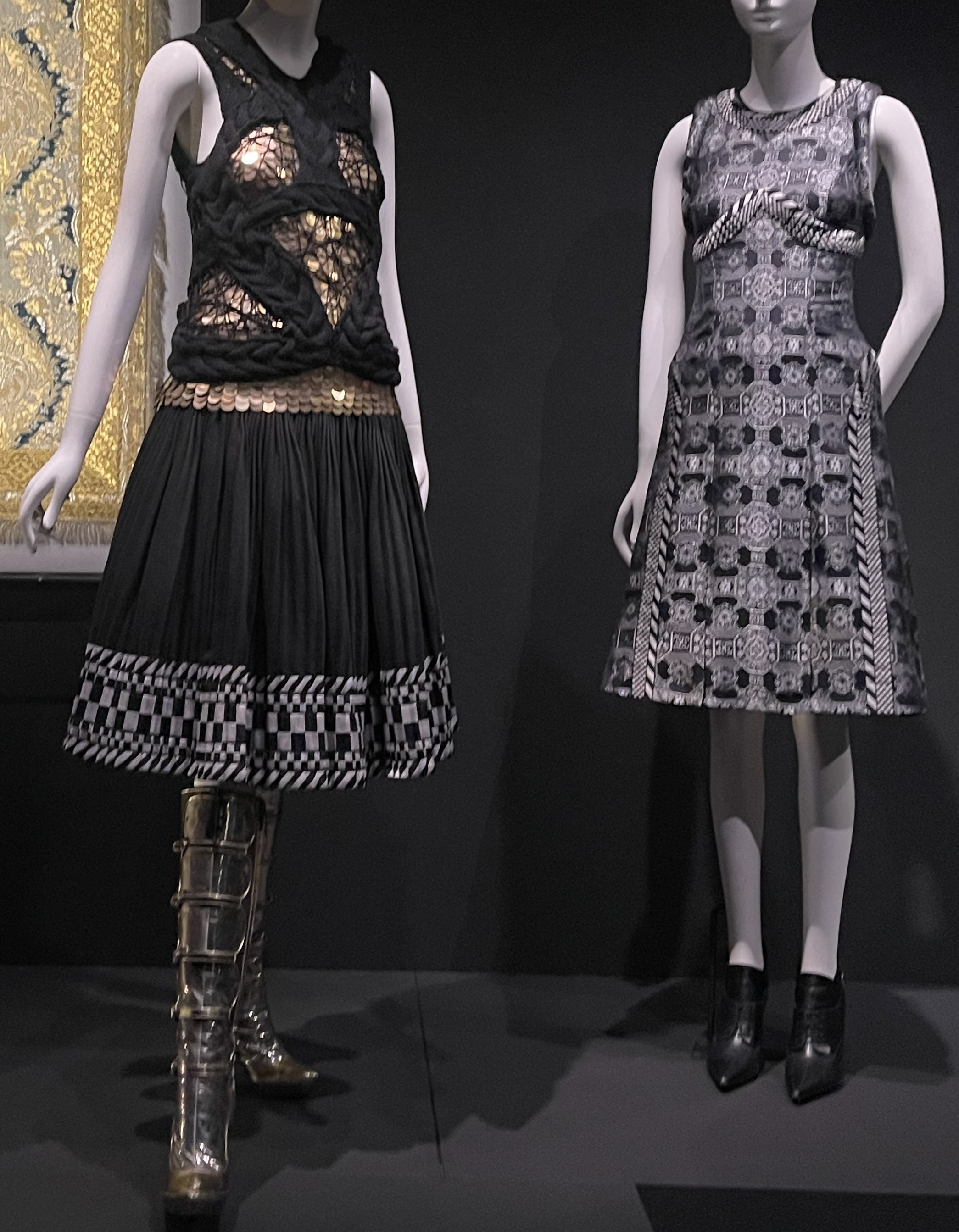
Patterned minidresses

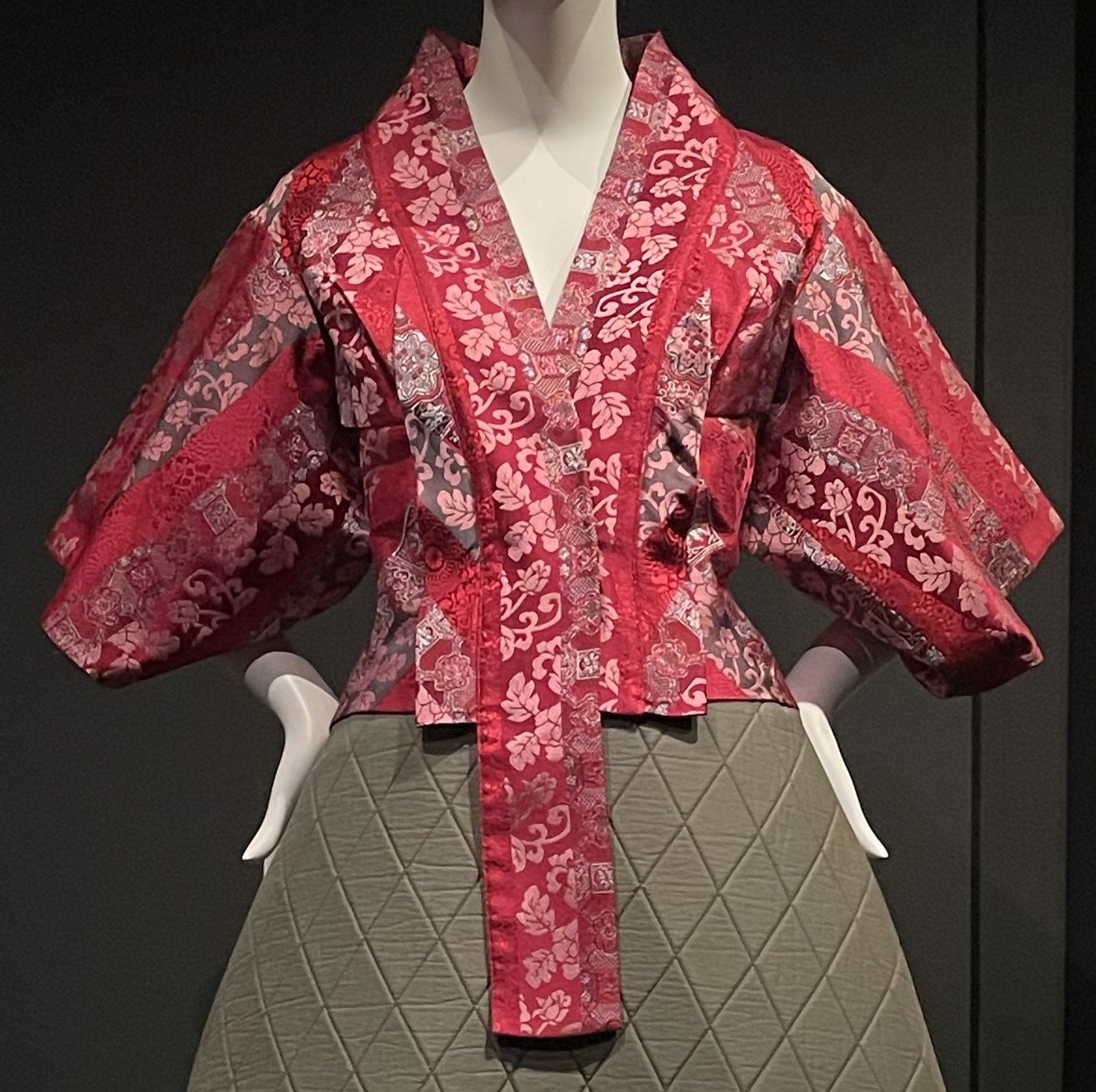
Kimono-inspired jacket over quilted khaki skirt

Items from Scanners at Mind, Mythos, Muse

Scanners (Autumn/Winter 2003) was the twenty-second collection McQueen designed for his eponymous fashion house. The collection is based on the idea of exiles travelling eastward through northern Eurasia: Siberia, Tibet, and finally Japan. (Note: Textile curators Clarissa M. Esguerra and Michaela Hansen noted that the collection avoids China, despite its influence on the textile traditions McQueen was drawing on. They suggested he may have chosen to focus on connecting Tibet and Japan aesthetically because of his personal interest in Buddhism and continuing fascination with Japanese clothing.) The materials, silhouettes, and aesthetics of the designs borrow heavily from the traditional clothing and art of those areas, reflecting the cultural exchanges that followed the Silk Road and the resulting spread of Buddhism. McQueen was inspired by the view of the tundra on a flight from London to Japan.

Overall, the collection had a sense of opulence, and McQueen's precision tailoring was prominent throughout. Silhouettes were luxuriously oversized, with frock coats over tight waists and full A-line skirts. There were also draped and empire waist dresses. Materials were similarly rich: brocades, fox and mink furs, and leather. Other items were rendered in modern materials like neoprene. Some critics suggested an influence from McQueen's time at Givenchy, particularly in the silhouettes and level of craftsmanship. As was typical for McQueen, there were historicist touches throughout.

The collection opened with Russian-inspired pieces featuring embroidery, pom-poms, metallic trimming, and fur – known historically in Russia as "soft gold" for its value as a luxury good. The embroidery may have drawn on imagery from Russian folk tales. This phase also included jute and quilted fabric for several items. The emphasis on muted khaki tones in both plain and quilted fabric suggested an influence from military chic. Although placed in the Russian section of the show, the panelled structure of Look 12 is reminiscent of samurai armour.

The introduction of checkered fabric and a complex geometrical floral pattern called kati rimo indicated a transition to Tibetan-inspired clothing. Kai rimo, meaning "brocade design", is a traditional Tibetan pattern derived from Chinese textiles. Items with this pattern, including fabric and painted furniture, are associated with Buddhism because they were often used for temple decorations. While traditionally multi-coloured, McQueen's versions in this section were rendered in black and white. Additional Tibetan-inspired elements include full circle skirts, use of shearling, and decorative braiding. The checked patterns, particularly the Glengarry cap from Look 33, have been variously interpreted as military chic or op art. Others have interpreted this segment, chiefly the bodysuits in leather, as drawing on motocross, punk fashion, and cyberpunk fashion, with influence from the film Blade Runner (1982).

The final phase of Scanners borrowed from the clothing and culture of Japan, incorporating kimono-like silhouettes and sunrise motifs that played on the country's nickname, Land of the Rising Sun. One model in the runway show was styled with a headpiece depicting the Japanese-style rising sun motif in red and white. In this portion, geometric patterns were rendered in red on white, particularly shokkō, the Japanese name for the Tibetan kai rimo pattern. Like kai rimo, shokkō patterns were also associated with Buddhist temples. Some looks may have been influenced by Japanese manga characters.

== Runway show ==
Adina Fohlin wearing the long white cape from her second appearance in Scanners

The runway show was staged on 8 March 2003 at the Grande halle de la Villette in Paris. Invitations were printed with images of McQueen's brain scan. The soundtrack included the Sid Vicious cover of "My Way", the Tiffany cover of "I Think We're Alone Now", and the Sparks single "This Town Ain't Big Enough for Both of Us". Air raid sirens played over pop music from Christina Aguilera and Britney Spears. The showpiece sections featured selections from the 1904 opera Madama Butterfly.

McQueen typically worked with a consistent creative team for his shows. Katy England was responsible for overall styling, while Gainsbury & Whiting oversaw production. Joseph Bennett took care of set design. Eugene Souleiman styled hair, while Val Garland handled makeup.

Philip Treacy created headwear for the collection, including Glengarry caps, headpieces based on the Japanese rising sun motif, and an engraved red and white glass mitre worn with Look 47. The mitre may have been a tribute to Isabella Blow, who was a mutual friend and muse of Treacy and McQueen; she wore a similar hat in a Vanity Fair portrait in 1997. The hat worn with Look 2, a black peaked cap adorned with a circle of black feathers shaped like spears may also have been a reworking of one that Blow wore for The New Yorker in March 2001.

The set was made to look like a desolate tundra with rocks and snow. The backdrop was a satellite photograph of Antarctica. McQueen said he "wanted it to be like a nomadic journey across the tundra. A big, desolate space, so that nothing would distract from the work." A clear plastic wind tunnel was suspended over the runway on industrial scaffolding for some models to walk through. Bennett designed the tunnel to look like a "35 mm film strip" in which models fought a "horizontal blizzard". Models were styled with large buns placed, like topknots, at the top of their heads; topknots were traditionally worn by samurai.

Fifty-eight looks were presented. (Note: For convenience, when referring to individual looks, this article uses the numbering from the Vogue retrospective of the collection. Their overview counts 57 looks, but contains a duplication and two omissions that cause the count to be incorrect. Look numbers mentioned in this article have not been adjusted. Looks 1 and 4 are the same ensemble. A pair of red and white ensembles following Look 42, which were visible only briefly in flashes of light, are omitted from the Vogue numbering.) The show opened with Adina Fohlin crossing the overhead walkway wearing a fur-trimmed vest and A-line skirt, followed by a series of about twenty Russian-inspired looks. Looks 23 to 41 were monochromatic black and white, with Tibetan-inspired patterns. Following these looks, the lights went down and Fohlin returned to the walkway, which now functioned as a wind tunnel. She wore a black and white bodysuit with a cape harnessed to her. Two models in red and white ensembles entered and crossed the darkened stage while Fohlin crossed above, her embroidered white cape billowing behind her in the wind.

The final phase of the show comprised fourteen looks inspired by Japanese culture, including several with red and white palettes and some fur coats. The lights went back down and Ai Tominaga appeared in the walkway, clad only in a long, ornately embroidered white kimono worn over briefs and boots. A strong wind and fake snow roared through the tunnel, blowing the kimono back and exposing her naked chest as she struggled to cross. The audience applauded when she reached the end. The lights came back up and the models returned to the runway for their final turn, followed by McQueen all in white.

== Reception ==
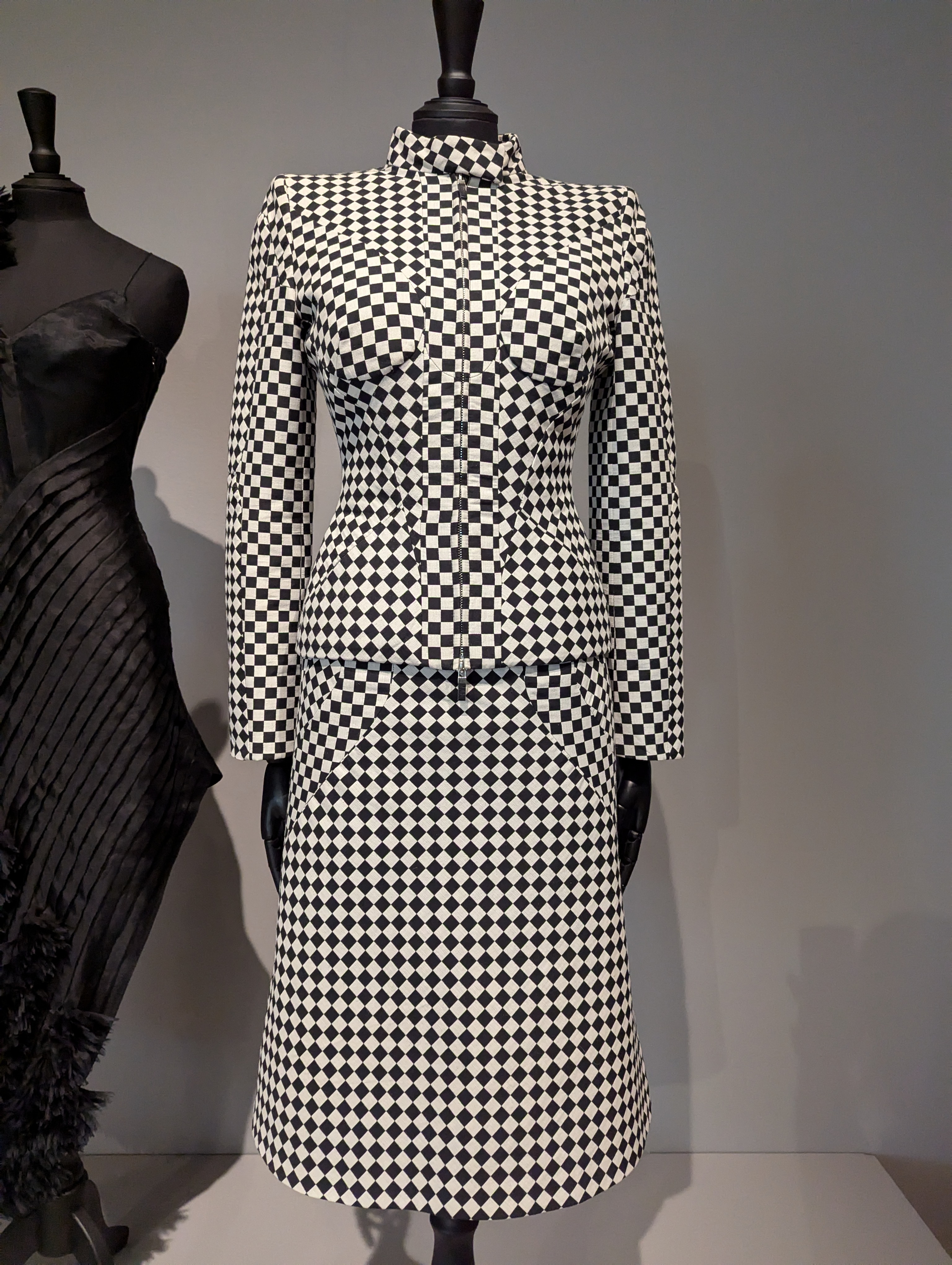
Checked suit at Lee Alexander McQueen & Ann Ray: Rendez-Vous

Scanners drew a mostly positive reception from contemporary critics. Authors differ in their assessment of the consensus. Andrew Wilson reported that the show was well-received, particularly the wind tunnel; while Katherine Gleason's book reported that reception was mixed. Women's Wear Daily reported that it was the 10th-most-viewed collection at Style.com that season, with 674,632 views in the first two weeks. Sales were reportedly good; a trunk show held at McQueen's New York location following the runway show garnered $1.2 million in orders. One corset-silhouetted coat trimmed with fur became a best-seller.

Reviewers noted the way McQueen played on contrasting ideas in various ways. Writing for The Independent, Susannah Frankel called it a "brilliant fusion" of opposing ideas like pop and punk, East versus West, and historicism and futurism. She felt the furs and brocades were romantic, while the checked prints and leathers were appropriate for "rock divas". Hilary Alexander of The Daily Telegraph noted contrasting silhouettes: severely tailored tops paired with soft, loose skirts, for example.

Many complimented the tailoring, McQueen's speciality. Sarah Mower did the same in her Vogue review, calling them "devilishly accurate", but argued that the best designs in the show were those that showed "McQueen's softer, more romantic side". Suzy Menkes of the International Herald Tribune and Charlie Porter of The Guardian both thought McQueen was refining a distinct silhouette with the collection. Frankel felt that McQueen's imagination came through despite the conventional style of some items. Several of the design motifs were considered on-trend for the season by critics: the voluminous shapes, black and white prints, and luxury elements. Designs inspired by armour, as in Look 12, were also popular; Porter suggested this was an exploration of a long-standing trend for metallics.

The artistic quality of the designs stood out for reviewers. Frankel thought that McQueen had correctly balanced his artistic showpieces with more commercial designs suitable for retail sale. Writing separately, Menkes and Lisa Armstrong at The Times each wrote that he had successfully married his showmanship and imagination with the refinement demanded by haute couture. Rod Hagwood felt the clothes were as close to couture as was possible for a designer working in ready-to-wear. Alexander thought the collection was intended to demonstrate McQueen's availability for couture orders, citing Tominaga's kimono as an example. Hand-embroidered with an orgy scene from an erotic painting, it had taken fifteen people five weeks of work and was expected to sell for £150,000.

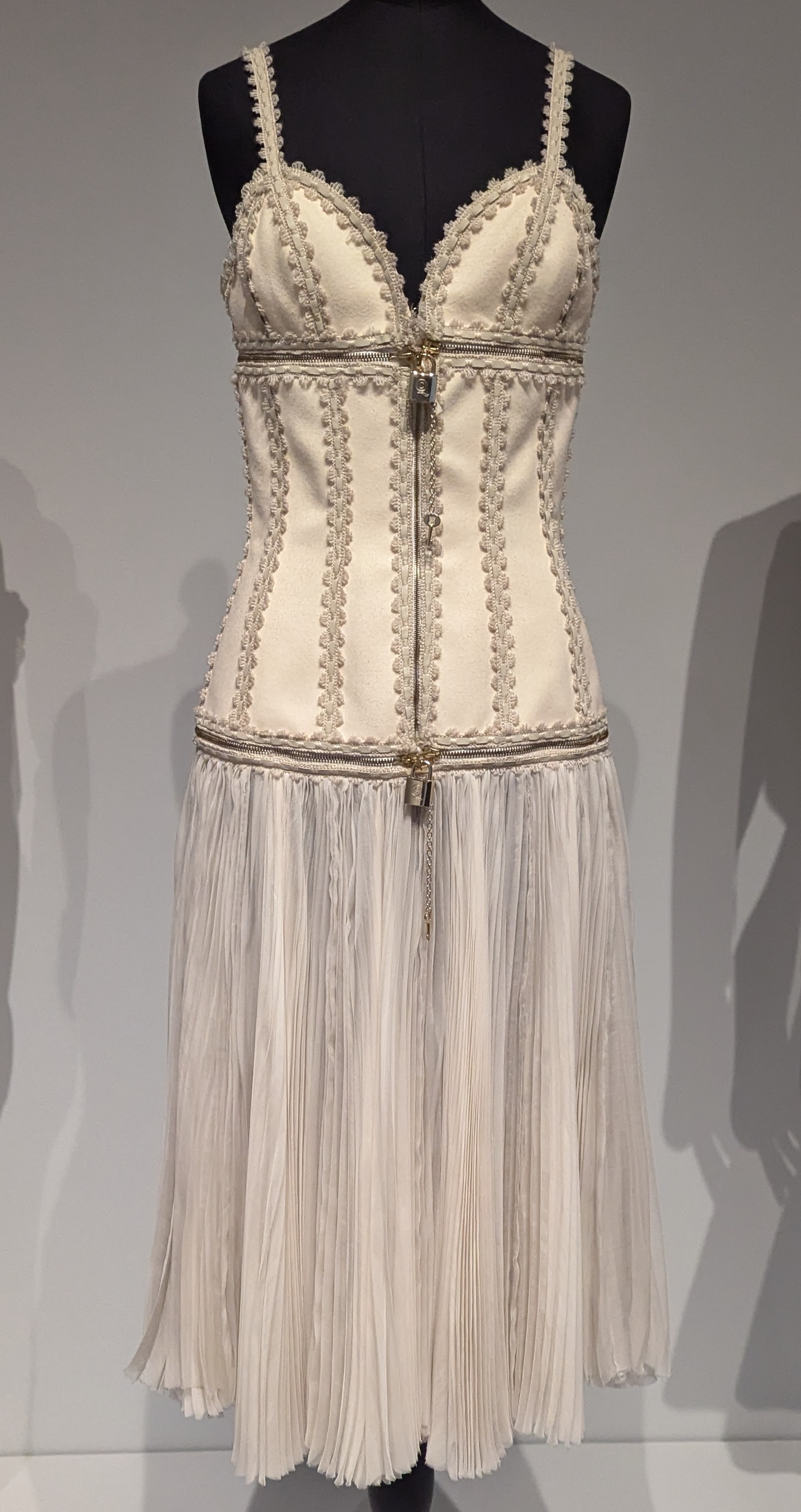
Dress from retail collection at Rendez-Vous exhibition

Most critics were impressed with the theatrical elements. More than one called them "jaw-dropping". Guy Trebay, in his fashion diary for The New York Times wrote that the narrative and concept had a "delightful absurdity". Mower thought the narrative was unintelligible, but felt the unique aesthetic it brought made it worthwhile. Others were pleased with the oversized showpieces from the wind tunnel, guessing that they were at least twenty feet long. Frankel called the use of an orgy scene as decoration for the final kimono a "quintessential McQueen" touch. Judith Watt likened Tominaga's appearance in the wind tunnel to the Winged Victory of Samothrace.

Some critics were more ambivalent. For The Sydney Morning Herald, Maggie Alderson thought the collection saw McQueen doing "his usual bit pushing the boundaries where drama meets misogyny", although she found it "superb" overall. Cathy Horyn of The New York Times liked the designs, but felt "the special effects overwhelmed the clothes". Similarly, Robin Givhan, in her Washington Post review, called the collection unmemorable compared to the finale. Karen Homer, writing in retrospect, compared it to the previous season's collection, Irere (Spring/Summer 2003), writing that both were commercially-focused collections that lacked McQueen's typical level of runway showmanship. The heavy use of fur was contentious. Porter called it the "one low point" of the show. Frankel criticised the use of fur as seeming "too easy a statement of status and wealth" compared to the more radical designs elsewhere in the collection.

== Analysis ==
Textile curators Clarissa M. Esguerra and Michaela Hansen identified a clinging bandage dress from the retail collection, which had zippers for side seams, as a reworking of similar styles by Azzedine Alaïa, a designer McQueen admired. They pointed to the tailoring in other items, such as the checked suit from Look 24, as evidence of McQueen's skill at cutting fabric. Each piece of the pattern is cut and arranged deliberately to create curves that flow along the body, creating an optical illusion that seems to sculpt the body.

Esguerra and Hansen felt that the way McQueen borrowed ideas from various cultures in Scanners, based on his own personal fixations, demonstrated that cultural appropriation can in some contexts be "specific and meaningful" while also being "incomplete or decorative". Anna Jackson argued that McQueen's incorporation of elements from Japanese clothing was more "transformative" than similar efforts by other designers, who treated these aesthetics as a novelty. Claire Wilcox thought McQueen made use of the kimono in this and other collections because it could easily be made modern while being grounded in a tradition of "exquisite material and craftsmanship".

In an essay about McQueen's use of death symbolism, Eleanor Townsend cited the brain scan invitation from Scanners as an example of the designer's awareness of his own mortality.

== Legacy ==
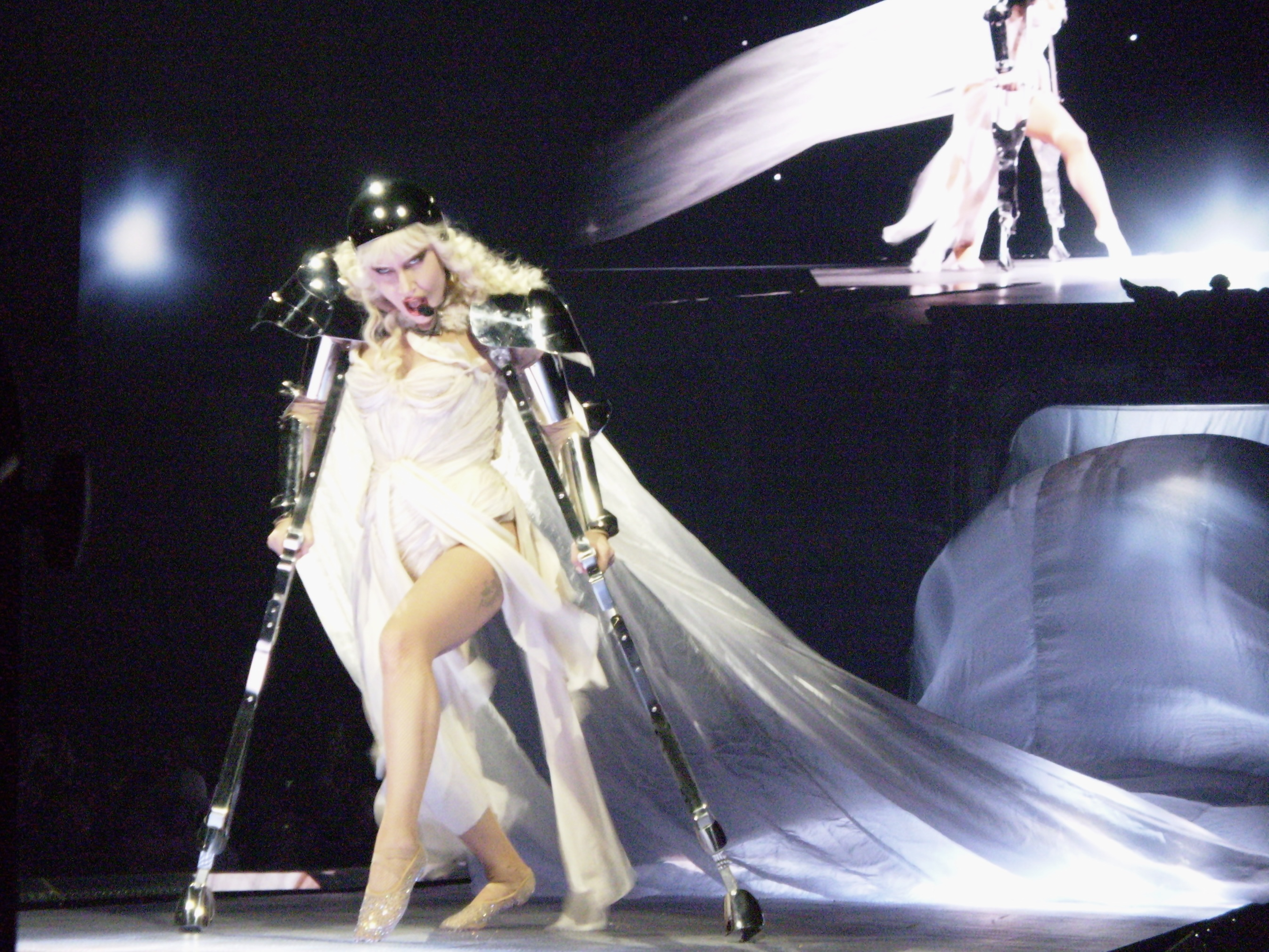
Lady Gaga performing "Paparazzi" during The Mayhem Ball in London; the billowing train of her dress is a reference to the finale of Scanners

A grey chiffon minidress with silver sequins from Scanners, Look 55 from the runway, has been popular with celebrities, especially for red carpet wear. Rapper Eve wore it to the 2003 CFDA Fashion Awards in New York City. Actress Sienna Miller wore it to the December 2003 premiere of Cold Mountain. Model Naomi Campbell wore it to a November 2004 party in London honouring McQueen, and model Lily Donaldson wore it to the 2006 Met Gala, the theme of which was AngloMania. Actress Julia Schlaepfer wore it to the British Academy of Film and Television Arts Tea Party in 2024.

McQueen explored complex black and white prints again in The Horn of Plenty (Fall/Winter 2009).

Look 33 was photographed for Vogue by Thomas Schenk. In 2014, Harper's Bazaar named Scanners one of McQueen's most memorable shows, citing the wind tunnel performances. Vogue interviewed several McQueen models for their February 2020 issue. Fohlin recalled her appearances in Scanners positively, saying that McQueen's "shows were always something more than a regular runway; as a model you had more space to perform."

Two items from Scanners appeared in the retrospective exhibit Alexander McQueen: Savage Beauty: Look 3, a dress covered with metal sequins, and Look 21, a jute dress heavily embroidered with flowers. An essay book released for the 2015 revival of the exhibition includes sketches from Scanners. A cropped kimono-inspired jacket from Scanners appeared in the 2019 exhibition Kimono: Kyoto to Catwalk.

The 2022 exhibition Lee Alexander McQueen: Mind, Mythos, Muse featured several items from Scanners, primarily from the retail collection, as well as Look 24, a checked suit. The checked suit was juxtaposed with a suit by 20th-century costume designer Gilbert Adrian, demonstrating their mutual mastery of advanced tailoring techniques.

For her Mayhem Ball concert tour, Lady Gaga incorporated a look that echoed the finale of Scanners, with a long white dress that billowed down the stage during her performance of "Paparazzi". Livia Caligor of W magazine wrote that while "McQueen’s image symbolized psychic collapse and defiant stillness; Gaga’s echo of it becomes a metaphor for her own fight for survival under the public eye."

== Bibliography ==
- Alexander McQueen | Women's Autumn/Winter 2003 | Runway Show. Alexander McQueen. 12 March 2012 – via YouTube.
- Bolton, Andrew (2011). Alexander McQueen: Savage Beauty. New York City: Metropolitan Museum of Art. ISBN 978-1-58839-412-5. OCLC 687693871.
- Esguerra, Clarissa M.; Hansen, Michaela (2022). Lee Alexander McQueen: Mind, Mythos, Muse. New York City: Delmonico Books. ISBN 978-1-63681-018-8. OCLC 1289986708.
- Fairer, Robert; Wilcox, Claire (2016). Alexander McQueen: Unseen. New Haven, Connecticut: Yale University Press. ISBN 978-0-300-22267-8. OCLC 946216643.
- Fox, Chloe (2012). Vogue On: Alexander McQueen. Vogue on Designers. London: Quadrille Publishing. ISBN 978-1849491136. OCLC 828766756.
- Gleason, Katherine (2012). Alexander McQueen: Evolution. New York City: Race Point Publishing. ISBN 978-1-61058-837-9. OCLC 783147416.
- Homer, Karen (2023). Little Book of Alexander McQueen: The Story of the Iconic Brand. London: Welbeck Publishing Group. ISBN 978-1-80279-270-6.
- Knox, Kristin (2010). Alexander McQueen: Genius of a Generation. London: A&C Black. ISBN 978-1-4081-3223-4. OCLC 794296806.
- Mora, Juliana Luna; Berry, Jess (2 September 2022). "Creative Direction Succession in Luxury Fashion: The Illusion of Immortality at Chanel and Alexander McQueen". Luxury. 9 (2–3): 117–140. doi:10.1080/20511817.2022.2194039.
- Thomas, Dana (2015). Gods and Kings: The Rise and Fall of Alexander McQueen and John Galliano. New York City: Penguin Publishing. ISBN 978-1-101-61795-3. OCLC 951153602.
- Watt, Judith (2012). Alexander McQueen: The Life and the Legacy. New York City: Harper Design. ISBN 978-1-84796-085-6. OCLC 892706946.
- Wilcox, Claire, ed. (2015). Alexander McQueen. New York City: Abrams Books. ISBN 978-1-4197-1723-9. OCLC 891618596.
  - Bethune, Kate. "Encyclopedia of Collections". In Wilcox (2015), pp. 303–326.
  - Jackson, Anna. "Refashioning Japan". In Wilcox (2015), pp. 116–121.
  - Thomas, Abraham. "Drawing a Line". In Wilcox (2015), pp. 60–67.
  - Townsend, Eleanor. "Memento Mori". In Wilcox (2015), pp. 159–163.
- Wilcox, Claire (2020). "Kimono Dreams". In Jackson, Anna (ed.). Kimono: Kyoto to Catwalk. London: Victoria and Albert Museum. pp. 269–286. ISBN 9781851779925. OCLC 1109797332.
- Wilson, Andrew (2015). Alexander McQueen: Blood Beneath the Skin. New York City: Simon and Schuster. ISBN 978-1-4767-7674-3. OCLC 1310585849.
