= Michelle Olley =

British writer, journalist and editor

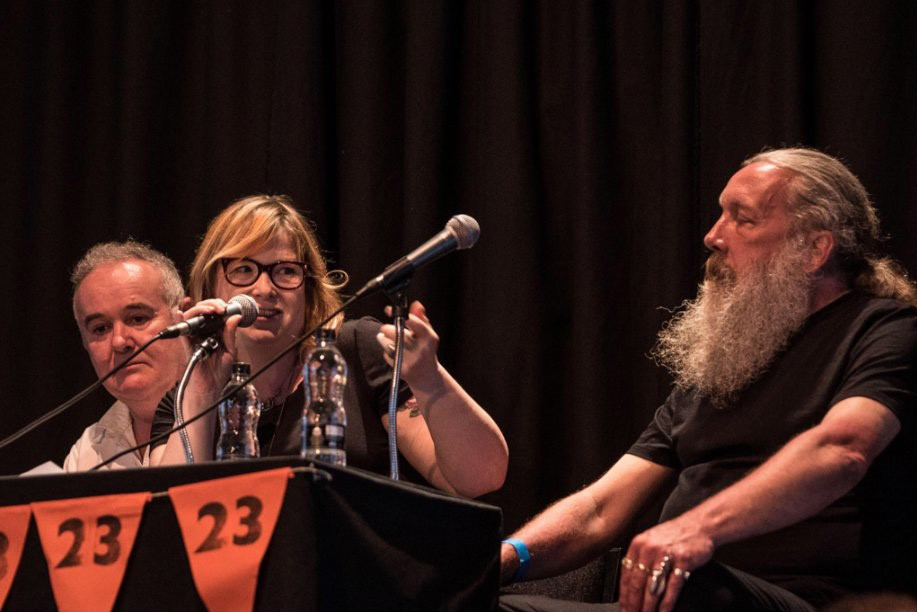
- Michelle Olley, center, hosting talk with Adam Curtis and Alan Moore, at Cosmic Trigger play event, London 2017 (photo: Beccy Strong)

Background information
- Born: Michelle Olley; Warrington, Cheshire, England
- Genres: Journalism, magazines
- Occupations: Writer, journalist, content editor
- Years active: 1984–present
- Website: www.facebook.com/Michelle Olley

Michelle Olley is a British writer, journalist and magazine and book editor.

Olley attended the University of Westminster in London where she attained a BA (Hons) in Media Studies, specialising in print journalism. She began her career in journalism at TW Publishing Ltd when writing and feature-editing Skin Two magazine (along with co-founders and editors Tim Woodward, Tony Mitchell and Grace Lau) – interviewing, amongst others, Jean Paul Gaultier, Tim Burton, Marilyn Manson, The Cramps, Marc Almond, Terence Sellers and Clive Barker – before becoming associate editor and director of TW Publishing Ltd at only 23 years of age.

== Skin Two Rubber Ball ==
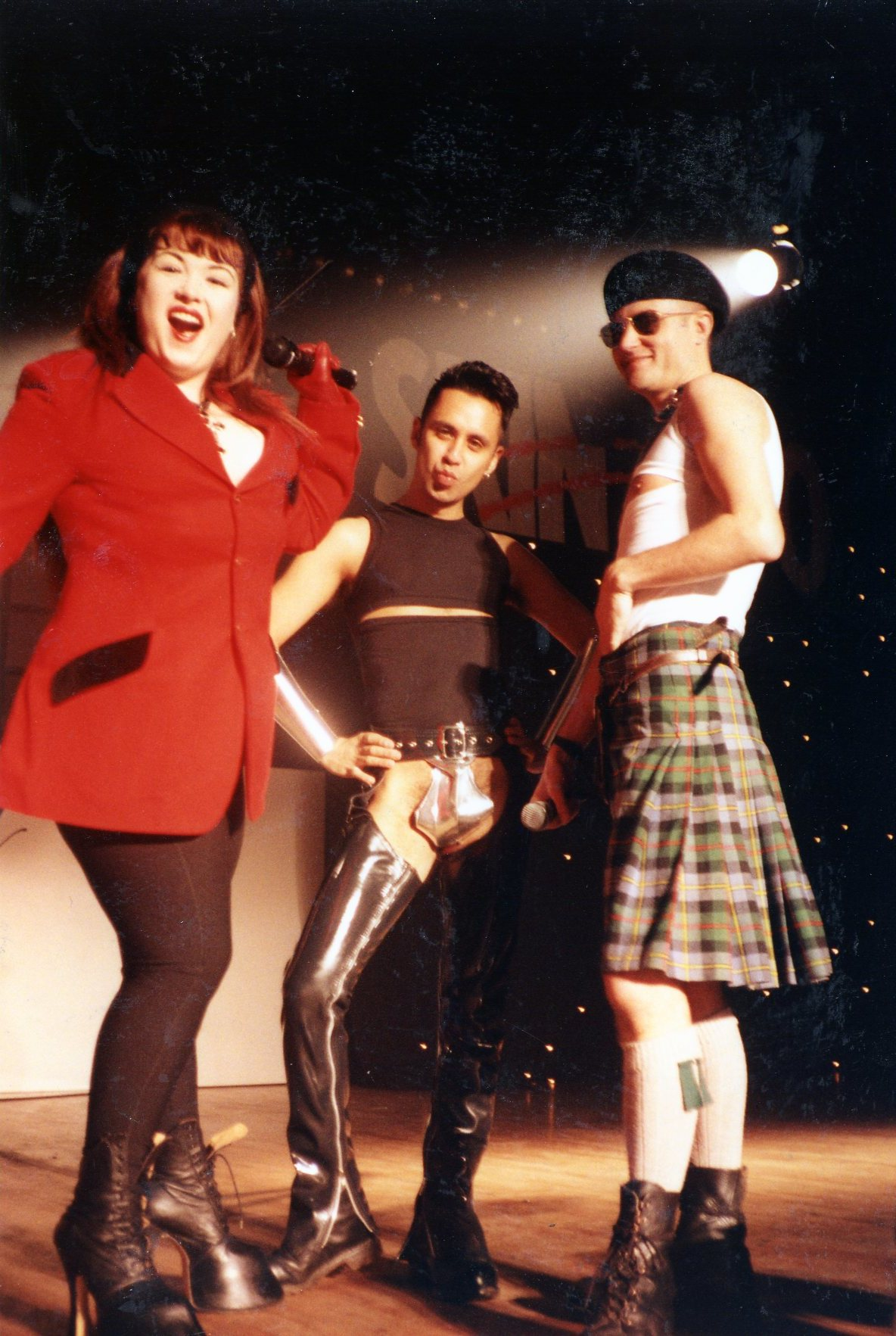
Michelle Olley, Neil Albert and Andrew Mann at the Skin Two Rubber Ball she co-hosted with Chi Chi Valenti

In 1992, Olley instigated the now-famous fetish club night the Skin Two Rubber Ball, which in the 1990s went on to become the largest and most high-profile fetish party in the world. The original Ball was held in aid of the MS Society and Cruisaid (the 1995 Ball alone raised £16,000 for the latter). Guests on the opening night included John Paul Gaultier, Vivienne Westwood, Leigh Bowery and Mick Jagger disguised in a fake moustache and Muir cap. Olley hosted, ran and MC-ed the Ball from 1992 through to 1996. In that time it became an international event with people coming from all over the world to attend and to participate in the increasingly elaborate fashion shows and performances.

== Band ==
From 1992 to 2000, Olley was vocalist with the electronic band Salon Kitty, composed of Olley on vocals, Simon Hoare on guitar, Neil Albert on keyboards/backing vocals, Andrew Mann also on backing vocals, Robert Michael on keyboards and Cliff Hewitt on drums . In 1995, the band released the single, "Freak" (written by Olley/Hoare) on Liquid Gold Records, and in 1996 signed to Epic Records.

The tumultuous history of Salon Kitty was described in their own words as: "9 lives, 8 years, 7 members, 6 near death experiences, 5 Countries (if you include Wales), 4 Managers, 3 record deals, 2 arrests, One hell of a ride."

== Alexander McQueen ==
Whilst at Fable, Olley was chosen by the British designer Alexander McQueen to be the main model for what became one of his most celebrated creations: the centre piece tableaux of his 2001 spring/summer collection, named Voss. The centre piece – which featured Olley within an enormous, moth-filled glass box, the sides of which fell away and smashed – was based on the Joel Peter Witkin image Sanitarium. The show also featured Kate Moss and Erin O'Connor.

Olley also modelled for Nick Knight's Sister Honey series created for Dazed & Confused with British designer Peter Saville. It was the McQueen show that brought Olley to Nick Knight's attention, as he later said of it on his SHOWstudio.com blog:

"The girl in the box was Michelle Olley. She modelled for me in a story I did called Sister Honey ... She was a writer and I remember she wrote a great piece on being the Butterfly Girl in the middle of that (McQueen) Glass Box show. I was sat on the front row, in between Alexandra Schulman and Gwyneth Paltrow. It was probably one of the best pieces of Fashion Theatre I have ever witnessed."

In spring 2011, Olley was asked by the Metropolitan Museum of Art in New York to contribute to their Alexander McQueen exhibition, Savage Beauty. She was interviewed by The Met and the interview included in the audio guide to the show. Also, Olley's detailed diary/journal of modelling for McQueen – written from 18 to 27 September as the show was being planned and staged – was included in the Met Museum website coverage of the Savage Beauty exhibition.

The diary relates details of the show and encounters with McQueen, ending with the account of when Olley returned home after the VOSS show to find "... a MASSIVE bouquet of flowers has arrived, with a note saying, 'Thank you for everything – you were beautiful! – Lee xxx' "

Olley was interviewed for the documentary on the life and work of McQueen, directed by Ian Bonhôte and Peter Ettedgui, released in 2018.

== Magazines ==
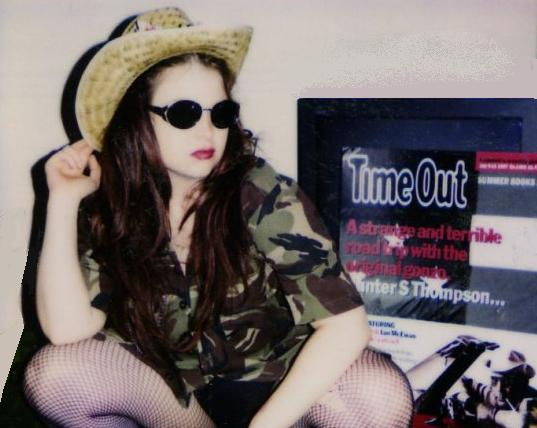
Michelle Olley, PH.UK, circa 1997

In 1997, Olley was brought in as deputy editor to help helm the now rather notorious relaunch of Penthouse UK (or PH.UK, as it was newly christened) as a modern redefinition of the traditional adult magazine, partly via the vision of designers and Face and Vogue fashion photographers such as Corrinne Day, Iain McKell and Ben Westwood garnered from Olley's formidable black book of contacts built through her previous editorships at fashion and fetish publications; and from the sexual politics brought from the same. Olley's vision of empowerment through sexual expression rather than exploitation soon ran into the more trad-view of owner Bob Guccione. The relaunch generated much medias interest but failed to reposition the magazine. The resultant implosion was recorded by a Channel 4 camera crew, making an early reality TV documentary series about the magazine's relaunch, and also featured in The Independent in a feature titled 'From the Penthouse to the Street', which opened with the line 'If anyone could have done it, it should have been Michelle Olley.'

Olley worked as deputy editor of So magazine, features editor at gay lifestyle magazine Attitude, in 1999 became editor of P.U.R.E magazine, followed by the deputy editorship at Fable and contributing editor of the Arts Council quarterly, Upstart magazine. As editor at Carlton Books, Olley has edited and written for several photographic anthologies, including the work of Herb Ritts, Derek Ridgers, Tracey Emin, Jeff Koons and Nick Knight.

As a freelance writer, Olley has contributed to The Sunday Times (cover feature, 'More Is More'), NOW, The Independent on Sunday, The Guardian, i-D, The Fashion, Minx, Looks, DJ and Attitude.

After being appointed content editor of The-Hotel.com, in 2003 Olley became website editor and media consultant at Faith Inc, before moving to Turner Classic Movies at Turner Broadcasting, London.

Olley is a contributor to Bonafide magazine, which covers hip-hop, electronic music and street art.

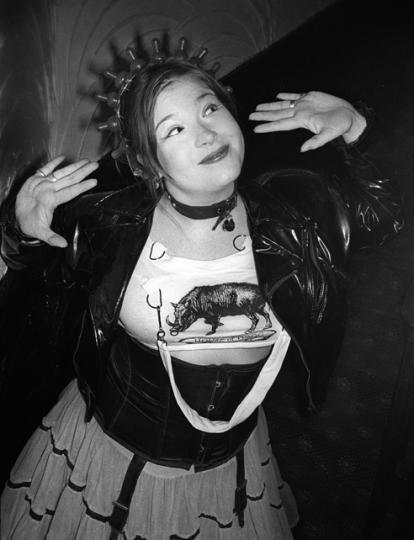
Michelle Olley, Rubber Ball, London, by Derek Ridgers

== Robert Anton Wilson and Cosmic Trigger Play ==
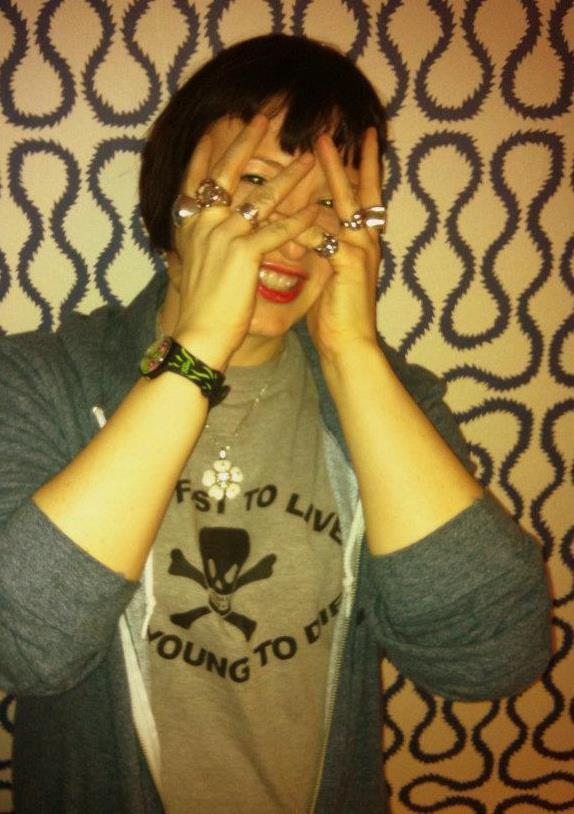
Michelle Olley, London, 2012

Olley became involved with bringing Robert Anton Wilson’s popular counter-culture work, Cosmic Trigger, to the stage in 2014. After volunteering to help with the initial crowdfunding phase of the production, Olley handle the press and curated the art gallery at the show's debut and 'Find The Others' event in Liverpool in November 2014. She was also the co-producers and director of marketing for the 2017 London run of the production. The play, written and directed by Daisy Campbell, ran for 23 performances, and also hosted special events with speakers including John Higgs, Ru and Claire Callendar from the Green Funeral Company, poet Salena Godden, Shardcore, David Bramwell and Adam Curtis with Alan Moore – a discussion event which Olley hosted.

In 2024 Olley wrote an introduction for the Hilaritas Press edition of Wilson's 1973 erotic fiction debut, The Sex Magicians.

== Journey to Nutopia ==
Shortly after the Cosmic Trigger run, author, musician and DJ Richard Norris partnered with Olley to launch the Journey To Nutopia project. Named after the conceptual country founded by John Lennon and Yoko Ono in New York on April Fool's Day 1973, Journey to Nutopia began with a three-day programme of talks, spoken word and acid house music as part of Birmingham's Lunar Festival in 2018. Inspired by Daisy Campbell’s Cosmic Trigger project, Greg Wilson’s Super Weird Happenings, Festival 23 and Alan Moore’s call for the re-emergence of local Arts Labs, the event aimed to sustain the community built up around the Cosmic Trigger and other works of Robert Anton Wilson. Guests included author John Higgs, artist and curator Eric Drass (aka Shardcore), academic and author Sadie Plant, psychedelic researchers Dr Rosalind Watts] and Midge BJ, DJ musicians A Guy Called Gerald and DiY Sound System and activist Jamie Kelsey. Since 2018 Journey to Nutopia has appeared at the Moseley Folk Festival, 2022's Delliaphonic Festival in Coventry and an ongoing series of evenings at The Cockpit in Marylebone, London.

== Personal life ==
Olley is married to Howard Gray, the British musician, music producer, composer, re-mixer and founder member of dance rock outfit Apollo 440.

Olley appeared in the video for The Spice Girls debut single "Wannabe" dressed as Nico of the Velvet Underground with her bandmates from Salon Kitty.
