= Jade Parfitt =

British model and presenter

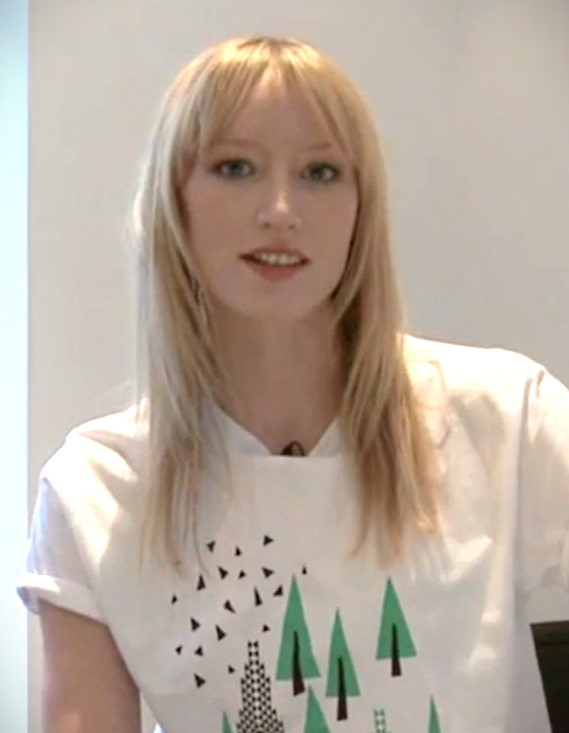
- Parfitt in 2011
- Born: 1 June 1978 (age 48); Hammersmith, London, England
- Occupations: Model; Vogue presenter
- Modelling information
- Height: 1.92 m (6 ft 3 1/2 in)
- Hair colour: Blonde
- Eye colour: Blue
- Agency: Storm, London. Women Model Management, New York. Viva, Paris

Jade Parfitt (born 1 June 1978) is a British model,presenter, founder of Bath Fashion Festival and event host. She was born in Hammersmith, London, England but she and her family moved to Devonshire, Southern England when she was 14.

== Career ==
When she was 15, Jade's mother entered her into a modeling competition on the UK TV show 'This Morning', in which she won and was awarded with a contract with MODELS1. Jade's runway debut was for the Prada Spring 1995 show in Milan in October 1994. The show featured many of the industry's top models of the time including Naomi Campbell, Linda Evangelista, Nadja Auermann, Brandi Quinones and Kirsty Hume. She was also booked for shows in Paris including Helmut Lang, Christian Dior, John Galliano and Ann Demeulemeester.

Jade was among the crop of British models that stormed onto the scene at the tail-end of the Kate Moss/waif debacle in the mid-1990s, along with Carolyn Park, Stella Tennant, Jacquetta Wheeler and Jodie Kidd, another 6-foot-plus Brit. Designers took advantage of her tall, exaggerated frame and soon, she was walking the runways for the elite of designers and fashion houses, such as Karl Lagerfeld, for both his line and later Chanel, Jean-Paul Gaultier, John Galliano and also Galliano for Christian Dior, Thierry Mugler and the late Alexander McQueen, for both McQueen's own line and when he was under the helm at Givenchy. Jade became a show staple for Galliano, McQueen, Chanel and Jean-Paul Gaultier, even later into her runway career in the 2000s. Jade starred in campaigns for Givenchy, Versace, Ferre, Moschino, Blumarine, and shot advertisements for Clinique and HSBC. Jade has interviewed countless fashion celebrities whilst presenting for Vogue. Jade has done a lot of charity work over the years, with model Jasmine Guinness she hosted ‘Clothesline’ charity fashion shows and exhibitions raising money for Aidlink, a charity that supports those affected by HIV/AIDS in sub Saharan Africa, in April 2022 alongside her colleague Alice Temperley she hosted and produced an event at Bath’s iconic museum The Holburne and raised thousands of pounds for charity “Bath welcomes refugees’.

== Personal life ==
Jade has three children, Jackson who was born in 2007, Tabitha who was born in 2015 and Silver who was born in 2017. Jade married Jack Dyson in 2018 and the family live between Devon and London.
