= Mac Suibhne =

The Gaelic surname Mac Suibhne is a patronymic form of Suibhne and means "son of Suibhne". The personal name Suibhne means "pleasant".

Anglicised forms of Mac Suibhne include: McSeveney, McSeveny, McSween, McSweeney, McSweeny, McSwiney, Sweaney, Sween, Sweeney, Sweenie, Sweeny, Sweney, Swiney, Swinney, A lenited variant form of Mac Suibhne is Mac Shuibhne. Anglicised forms of the latter Gaelic name include: (possibly) Mawhinney, McQueen, McQueeney, McQueenie, (possibly) McWhinney, Queen, Queeney, Wheen.

One particular family that has borne the surname Mac Suibhne is Clann Suibhne (see Clan Sweeney). Members of this Scottish family settled in Ulster as gallowglass warriors in the Middle Ages.

== People ==
=== mac Suibhne ===
- Dubhghall mac Suibhne, 13th-century Argyllian magnate

=== Mac Suibhne ===
- Aodán Mac Suibhne, 21st-century hurling referee
- Aodh Mac Suibhne, 16th-century Irish gallowglass
- Eóin Mac Suibhne, 14th-century Scottish nobleman
- Micheál Mac Suibhne, 18th-century poet
- Murchadh Mac Suibhne, 13th-century Argyllian magnate
