= McSween =

MacSween and McSween are surnames of Gaelic origin. People with those surnames include:

- Alexander McSween (c.1843–1878), Canadian-American participant in the Lincoln County War of 1878
- Donald McSween (born 1964), American ice hockey player
- Harold B. McSween (1926–2002), U.S. Representative from Louisiana.
- Harry McSween (born 1945), American geologist and planetologist
- John MacSween (fl. 1310), Scottish nobleman
- John Macsween (entrepreneur) (1939–2006), Scottish butcher and entrepreneur
- Roderick MacSween (born 1935), Scottish pathologist
- Susan McSween (1845–1931), American rancher

== See also ==
- Macsween (butcher), Scottish food company known for haggis
- Clan MacQueen, a Scottish clan also known as Clan MacSween
- Mac Suibhne (surname)
- 5223 McSween, an asteroid named after Harry McSween
- Barry MacSweeney (1948–2000), English poet and journalist
- McSweeney (surname)
- Castle Sween, a Scottish castle associated with Clan Sweeney
- Sweeney (name)
- Clan Sweeney (also known as Clan MacSweeney), an Irish clan of Scottish origin
- Mary MacSwiney (1872–1942), Irish politician and educationalist
