= McQueen (surname) =

McQueen, Mcqueen, and MacQueen, Macqueen are English-language surnames derived from Scottish Gaelic. There have been several differing etymologies given for the surnames; as well as several differing ways to represent the surname in modern Scottish Gaelic. The surnames are not among the most common surnames in the United Kingdom, Australia, nor the United States.

== Etymology ==
There have been several differing etymologies given for the surname. One view is that it is an anglicised form of the Gaelic MacShuibhne, which means 'son of Suibhne'. The Gaelic name Suibhne is a byname, which means 'pleasant'. This Gaelic name was also used as a Gaelic equivalent of the Old Norse byname Sveinn, which means 'boy'. Another view is that the anglicised surname is derived from the Gaelic MacCuinn, meaning 'son of Conn'. The Gaelic personal name Conn is derived from an Old Irish word meaning 'chief, head'. Another suggested origin of the anglicised surname is from the Gaelic MacCuithein.

A similarly spelt surname, Macquien, is considered to be often confused with, and wrongly represented by, Macqueen. This name is considered to be derived from the Gaelic personal name Aoidhean which means 'little Aodh'. The Gaelic personal name Aodh is a modern form of Áed, which means 'fire'. Macquien can be presented in Scottish Gaelic as MacAoidhein; and in the north of Scotland as MacCuithein.

== Historical forms of the name ==
The surname has undergone changes over the years. Mackquean (1502); M'Queyn (1543); M'Queen (1609).

== Representation in modern Scottish Gaelic ==
The Anglicised surnames can be represented in Scottish Gaelic in several different ways. MacCuinn is the form for the surname of Galloway. MacCuithein is the form for the surname in the north of Scotland; MacCuain is a name found in Argyll around the islands of Easdale, Luing, and Seil; and MacShuibhne is the form in the south of Scotland..

== Similar surnames ==
Similar surnames are McKeen (from Ian); McQuinn (from Conn); McSwain, McSween (from Suibhne, or possibly Sveinn); McSweeney, McQueeney (from Suibhne); Macquien (from Aoidhean); Queen (a reduced form of the surname McQueen, also from Quena).

== Statistics ==
Neither surname ranked within the top 300 recorded in Scotland, within the United Kingdom Census 1901.

McQueen, Mcqueen

In the United Kingdom, the surname was ranked in the United Kingdom Census 1881 as the 17,664th most common surname; with 125 recorded, equalling less than 0.001% of the population. Currently, the surname is ranked as the 1,950th most common; with 3,204 recorded, equalling 0.007% of the population. This census shows that the county where the surname occurred the most was Lancashire (in England); with 22 of the name recorded, equalling 0.0006% of the population there. The town where the surname occurred the most, and was most frequent, was Newcastle upon Tyne All Sts (in Northumberland, England); with 11 of the name recorded, equalling 0.0424% of the population there.

In Australia, the surname is ranked 1,531st most common name; with 1,078 recorded equalling 0.007% of the total population.

The surname was ranked as the 1,322nd most common surname in the 1990 United States census; accounting for 0.009% of the population. It was ranked 1,757th most common surname in the 2000 United States census; with 18,701 recorded. Of these this number, 60.16% were recorded as being (non-Hispanic) white; 36.12% (non-Hispanic) black; 0.29% (non-Hispanic) Asian and Pacific Islander; 0.44% (non-Hispanic) American Indian and Native Alaskan; 1.59% (non-Hispanic) of two or more races; 1.4% Hispanic origin.

Currently worldwide, the surname is most frequently found in Australia, with a frequency of 117.79 per million people (fpm); New Zealand with 113.22 fpm; the United Kingdom with 75.78 fpm; the United States with 57.84 fpm; Canada with 55.47 fpm. The top region where it is located is Rangitikei District (in New Zealand); with 550.36 fpm. The top city is Glasgow (in Scotland). The top forenames with the surname are James, John, David, Robert, and William.

MacQueen, Macqueen

In the United Kingdom, the surname was ranked in the United Kingdom Census 1881 as the 8,913th most common surname; with 347 recorded, equalling 0.001% of the population. Currently, the surname is ranked as the 6,817th most common; with 714 recorded, equalling 0.002% of the population. This census shows that the county where the surname occurred the most, and was most frequent, was Inverness-shire (in Scotland); with 86 of the name recorded, equalling 0.0986% of the population there. The town where the surname occurred the most, and was most frequent, was Kilmuir (in Inverness-shire, Scotland); with 26 of the name recorded, equalling 1.0136% of the population there.

In Australia, the surname is ranked 4,770th most common name; with 331 recorded equalling 0.002% of the total population.

The surname was ranked as the 27,425th most common surname in the 1990 United States census; accounting for less than 0.001% of the population. It was ranked 24,115th most common surname in the 2000 United States census; with 976 recorded. Of this number, 96.21% were recorded as being (non-Hispanic) white; 1.02% (non-Hispanic) black; 0.92% (non-Hispanic) of two or more races; 1.43% Hispanic origin.

Currently worldwide, the surname is most frequently found in Australia, with a frequency of 33.91 per million people (fpm); Canada with 18.11 fpm; the United Kingdom with 16.89 fpm; New Zealand with 8.46 fpm; the United States with 4.54 fpm. The top region where it is located is the Marlborough district (in New Zealand); with 550.36 fpm. The top city is Glasgow (in Scotland). The top forenames with the surname are John, Donald, David, Andrew, and James.

=== Distribution maps ===
The following maps show the distribution of families with the surname McQueen and MacQueen.

McQueen, per 1920 United States census

MacQueen, per 1920 United States census

McQueen, per Canada 1911 Census

MacQueen, per Canada 1911 Census

== Persons with the surname ==
=== McQueen or Mcqueen ===
- Adolph McQueen, U.S. Army major general
- Alexander McQueen (1969–2010), British fashion designer
- Andy McQueen (born 1991), Canadian actor
- Armelia McQueen (1952–2020), American actress
- Butterfly McQueen (1911–1995), American actress
- Catherine McQueen (born 1978), Scottish model, actress, TV presenter and DJ
- Chad McQueen (1960–2024), American actor
- Chris McQueen (born 1987), Australian rugby league footballer
- Cilla McQueen (born 1949), English poet
- Cozell McQueen (1962–2026), American basketball player
- Delroy McQueen, British weightlifter
- Diana McQueen (born 1961), Canadian politician
- Elizabeth Lippincott McQueen (1878–1958), American aviation pioneer
- Ewen McQueen, religious leader
- Geoff McQueen (1947–1994), television screenwriter
- George McQueen (1895–1951), Scottish football player
- Geraldine McQueen (born 1976), Grenadian middle-distance runner
- Glenn McQueen (1960–2002), computer character animator at Pixar Animation Studios
- Gordon McQueen (1952–2023), Scottish football player
- Harold McQueen Jr. (1952–1997), American who was the first criminal executed by the State of Kentucky
- Hayley McQueen (born 1979), British TV presenter and reporter, daughter of Gordon
- Humphrey McQueen (born 1952), Australian public intellectual
- Jim McQueen, American freelance sports illustrator
- Joe McQueen (1919–2019), American musician
- John McQueen (1804–1867), American member of the Confederate States Congress during the American Civil War
- John C. McQueen (1899–1985), U.S. Marine Corps lieutenant general
- Keith McQueen (1923–2000), British Army major general
- Laila McQueen (born 1993), American drag queen and make-up artist
- Lauren McQueen (born 1996), English actress
- Lee McQueen, participant on the UK television show The Apprentice
- Mark McQueen (born 1980), British BAFTA-nominated film and TV director
- Matt McQueen (1863–1944), Scottish football player
- Mekyah McQueen, American politician
- Mike McQueen (1950–2017), former baseball pitcher
- Natalie McQueen (born 1989), English musical theatre actress
- Peter McQueen (c. 1780 – 1820), American Indian leader
- Roger McQueen (born 2006), Canadian ice hockey player
- Ronald McQueen, musician
- Sam McQueen (born 1995), English football player
- Steve McQueen (1930–1980), American actor
- Steve McQueen (director) (born 1969) English artist and film director
- Steven R. McQueen (born 1988), American actor
- Tanya McQueen (born 1972), American television personality
- Timoria McQueen Saba, American politician
- Wini McQueen (born 1943), American quilter

=== MacQueen or Macqueen ===
- MacQueen of Pall à Chrocain, Highland deer stalker
- Alex MacQueen (born 1974), English actor
- Edith MacQueen (1900–1977), Scottish historian
- Eilidh Macqueen (born 1986), Scottish actress
- Hector MacQueen (born 1956), Scottish academic
- John Macqueen Ward (born 1940), Scottish businessman
- Kenneth Macqueen (1897–1960), Australian farmer and watercolorist
- Mary Macqueen (1912–1994), Australian artist
- Norman Macqueen (1920–1942), British flying ace
- Robert Macqueen, Lord Braxfield (1722–1799), Scottish lawyer and judge
- Rod MacQueen (born 1949), Scottish rugby coach
- Thomas MacQueen (1792–1840), British army officer
- W. J. MacQueen-Pope (1888–1960), English theatre historian and publicist

== Fictional characters ==
- Duke McQueen, main character in the comic, Starlight
- Geraldine McQueen, a fictional singer-songwriter from Britain's Got the Pop Factor...
- McQueen family, in the television soap opera Hollyoaks
- Lightning McQueen, the main character of the Cars franchise

== See also ==
- Clan Macqueen, Scottish clan
- McQueen (disambiguation)
