= The Widows of Culloden =

2006 fashion collection by Alexander McQueen

Look 47, colloquially known as the Widow's Weeds, a full-length ivory gown in silk tulle and lace with an antlered headdress, worn here by model Raquel Zimmermann in the original runway show

The Widows of Culloden (Scottish Gaelic: Bantraich de cuil lodair) is the twenty-eighth collection by British fashion designer Alexander McQueen, released for the Autumn/Winter 2006 season of his eponymous fashion house. It was inspired by his Scottish ancestry and is regarded as one of his most autobiographical collections. It is named for the women widowed by the Battle of Culloden (1746), often seen as a major conflict between Scotland and England. Widows makes extensive use of the McQueen family tartan and traditional gamekeeper's tweeds, as well as other elements taken from Highland dress. Historical elements reflected the fashion of the late Victorian era and the 1950s.

The collection's runway show was staged on 3 March 2006 during Paris Fashion Week. It was dedicated to Isabella Blow, McQueen's friend and muse. The show marked a return to theatricality for McQueen, whose shows in the preceding two seasons had been comparatively conventional. Widows was presented on a square stage with a glass pyramid at its centre. Fifty-one ensembles were presented across roughly three phases, ending with a Pepper's ghost illusion of English model Kate Moss projected within the glass pyramid.

Critical response was positive, especially towards McQueen's tailoring and the collection's balance of artistry and commercial practicality. The show is regarded as one of McQueen's best, with the illusion of Kate Moss viewed as its highlight. Ensembles from Widows are held by various museums and have appeared in exhibitions such as the McQueen retrospective Alexander McQueen: Savage Beauty. The Widows of Culloden collection and show, especially the Kate Moss illusion, have been extensively analysed, especially as an exploration of gothic literature in fashion. Widows is frequently discussed with McQueen's first Scottish-themed collection, Highland Rape (Autumn/Winter 1995), whose runway show was highly debated in the fashion world.

== Background ==
McQueen family tartan

British fashion designer Alexander McQueen was known for his imaginative, sometimes controversial designs, and dramatic fashion shows. Over the course of his career, which lasted from 1992 until his death in 2010, he explored a broad range of ideas and themes, particularly sexuality, death, violence, romanticism, and historicism. He began as an apprentice on Savile Row, earning a reputation as an expert tailor; later he learned dressmaking as head designer for French fashion house Givenchy. (Note: From October 1996 to October 2001, McQueen was simultaneously head designer at Givenchy and at his own label.)

Although he was born in England, McQueen's father was of Scottish descent. His mother was fascinated with this family history, an interest she passed on to McQueen early in his childhood. McQueen maintained an interest in contentious periods of Scottish history, especially instances of Scottish–English conflict such as the Jacobite risings and the Highland Clearances. He resented the romanticisation of Scotland (sometimes called tartanry), particularly by other British fashion designers such as Vivienne Westwood, and drew inspiration from Scottish resistance to English domination.

McQueen's first Scotland-inspired collection was the controversial Highland Rape (Autumn/Winter 1995), which marked his first use of the red, black, and yellow McQueen clan tartan. The collection became known for its runway show, which featured models walking unsteadily down the runway in torn and bloody clothing. Intended as a reference to what McQueen described as "England's rape of Scotland", the collection was described by many British fashion critics as misogynistic, a characterisation to which McQueen consistently objected. American journalists tended to be more positive about the collection: Amy Spindler of The New York Times called it "a collection packed with restless, rousing ideas, by far the best of the London season." In retrospect, Highland Rape is considered to be the launching point of McQueen's fame, and has been credited with leading to his appointment as at Givenchy. Shortly before his contract there ended, he sold 51% of his own label to the Gucci Group, retaining creative control.

== Concept and collection ==
[This] collection is . . . romantic but melancholic and austere at the same time. It was gentle but you could still feel the bite of cold, the nip of the ice on the end of your nose. . . . With bustles and nipped waists, I was interested in the idea that there are no constraints on the silhouette. I wanted to exaggerate a woman's form, almost along the lines of a classical statue.

— Alexander McQueen, Another Magazine, Autumn/Winter 2006

The Widows of Culloden (Autumn/Winter 2006) is the twenty-eighth womenswear collection designed by McQueen for his eponymous fashion house. McQueen spoke of wanting to "show a more poetic side" of his work with the collection. The collection was inspired by McQueen's Scottish ancestry, his love for the natural world, and Shakespeare's Scottish play Macbeth. Its name comes from the women who were widowed following the Battle of Culloden (1746). This engagement marked the defeat of the Jacobite rising of 1745, in which Charles Edward Stuart raised a Scots Jacobite army and attempted to regain the British throne. The battle led to British efforts to dismantle the Scottish clan system and ban the wearing of tartan, and has historically been mythologized as a conflict between Scotland and England.

Widows features the return of many of McQueen's signature elements: sharp tailoring, altered silhouettes, and a dark yet romantic atmosphere; he personally created most patterns for the collection. Multiple authors described it as something of a greatest hits collection for the designer. Soft dresses and flowing evening gowns accompanied McQueen's typical tailored suits and dresses. The light, ethereal aspect of many of the dresses is credited to McQueen's time at Givenchy, where he learned le flou, the dressmaking side of haute couture.

Many elements from the collection were taken directly from or referred to traditional Highland dress, both upper- and lower-class. The primary fabrics used were tartan and tweed; Aran knit, brocade, black velvet, organza, and chiffon also featured in several ensembles. Some garments, especially those made with chiffon, were torn or left with unfinished seams. Other items were artificially aged to create the appearance of having been worn. As in Highland Rape, the tartan used in the collection is the red, yellow, and black McQueen family tartan, woven in a historic mill in Lochcarron, Scotland. Several of the tartan garments included aspects of the traditional féileadh-mór, a large piece of fabric which is wrapped around the body and held by a belt, and the kilt, a knee-length wraparound skirt. Other uses of tartan were non-traditional, such as tailored jackets and suits.

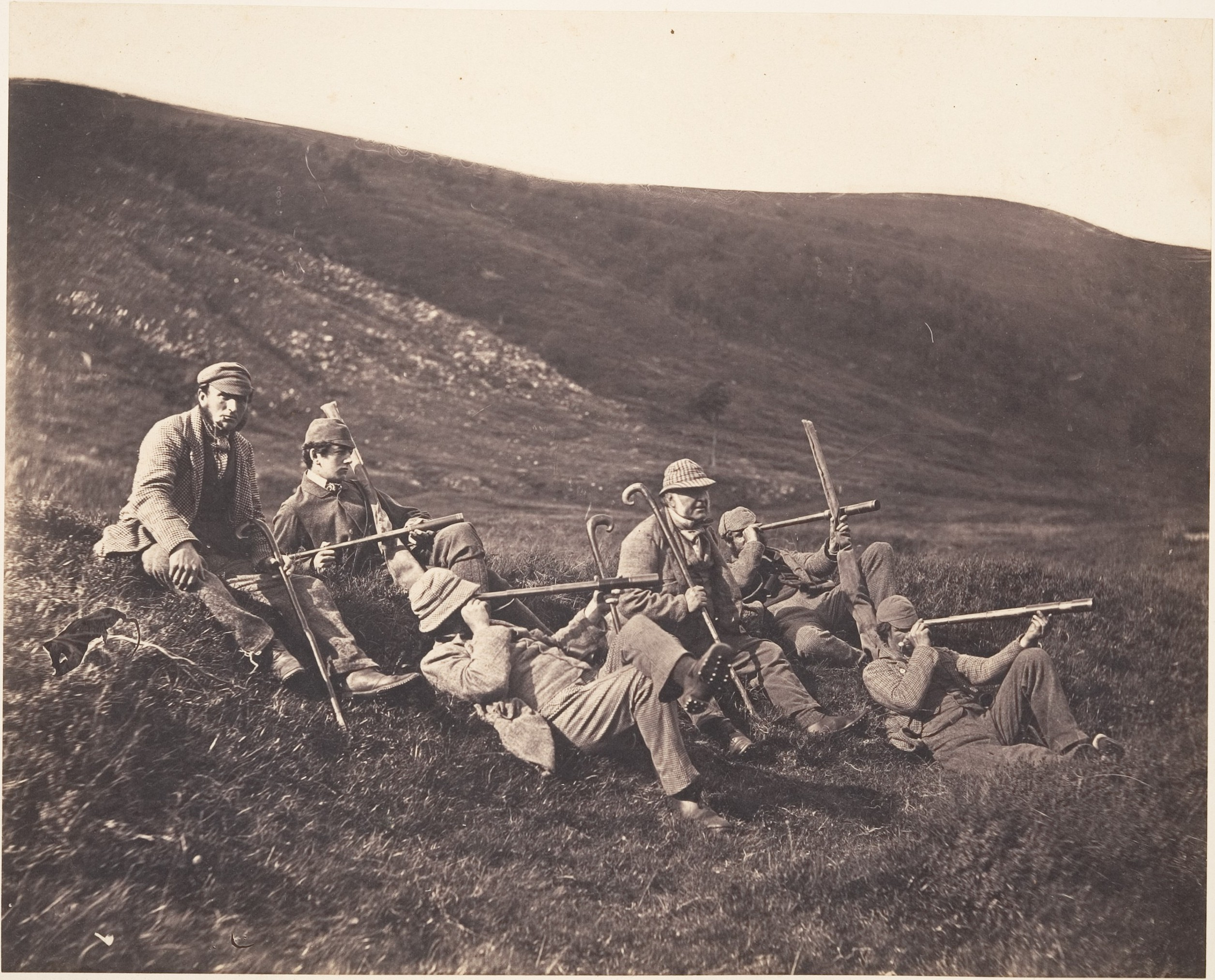
Deer stalkers on Glenfeshie Estate in Scotland, c. 1858

The extensive use of tweed references the garb of traditional Scottish gamekeepers. Tweed production is indigenous to Scotland, especially in the Scottish Isles. In the 1840s, the fabric acquired an association with high-class leisure, after the British nobility began taking hunting trips to Scottish estates and adopting the tweed worn by locals and estate staff. The tweed also plays on McQueen's Autumn/Winter 2005 collection, which made similarly heavy use of the fabric.

Hunting and gamekeeping is also referenced in the use of animal fur and items made from the feathers and wings of game birds. Usage of animal parts, both natural and imitation, was typical for McQueen; he was especially partial to the symbolism associated with birds. The show's headpieces made particular use of avian elements. They were created by Irish-born milliner Philip Treacy, a frequent collaborator of McQueen's; they had been introduced by McQueen's friend and muse Isabella Blow. Some authors interpreted their complexity and emphasis on birds as a gesture toward Blow, who loved elaborate headwear and the sport of falconry. Other authors read them as an allusion to bird-women in mythology; author Katharine Gleason wrote that the headdresses imparted a "mythic quality" to the models.

Many ensembles incorporated historical elements and allusions to other designers. Fashion historian Judith Watt noted references to the Arts and Crafts movement, as well as the S-bend silhouette common in the fashion of the 1870s and 1880s. The use of wasp waists, bustles, close tailoring, and belted jackets can be seen as a reference to Victorian and 1950s fashion. Some designs alluded to the military uniforms of World War II, and model Spitfire planes were repurposed as hair accessories. The winged headpieces referenced a series of winged headdresses made by Italian couturier Elsa Schiaparelli in the 1930s. Several of the evening gowns took inspiration from a dress designed in 1987 by fellow British designer John Galliano, nicknamed the "shellfish dress" for its layers of white organza ruffles that resembled stacked clamshells. McQueen had long admired and sought to emulate the complicated construction of the original.

== Runway show ==
=== Production details ===
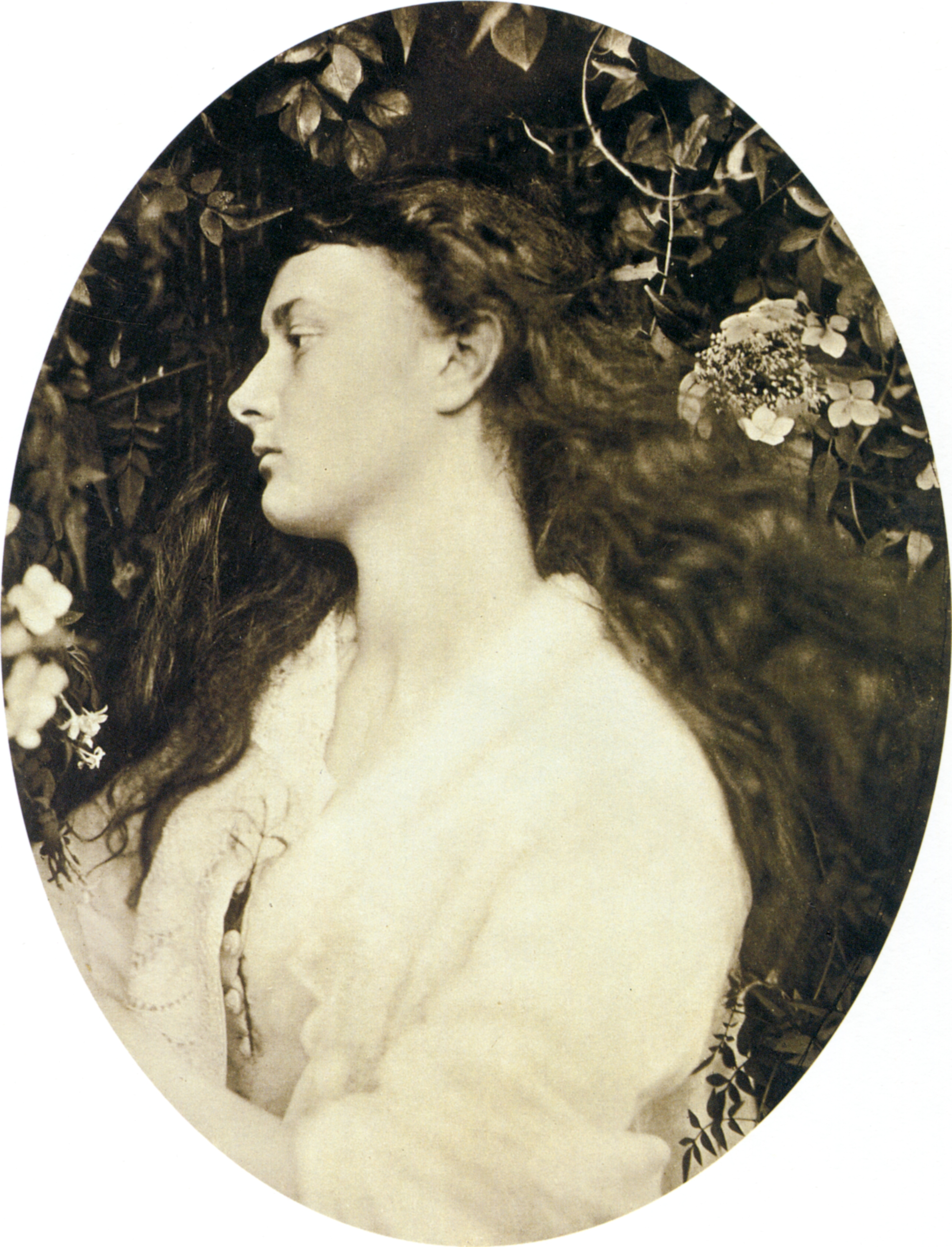
1872 photograph by Julia Margaret Cameron used on the show's invitation

The runway show for The Widows of Culloden was staged on 3 March 2006 at the Palais Omnisports de Paris-Bercy in Paris, and was dedicated to Isabella Blow. The invitations for the Widows show were black and white, with an 1872 photograph by Julia Margaret Cameron and the title of the show rendered in Scottish Gaelic: Bantraich de cuil lodair. Seating was so limited that the show was actually staged twice in one night to accommodate all the guests. Widows marked a return to theatricality for McQueen, whose shows in the preceding two seasons – The Man Who Knew Too Much (Autumn/Winter 2005) and Neptune (Spring/Summer 2006) – had been comparatively conventional.

McQueen typically worked with a consistent creative team for his shows, and Widows was no exception. McQueen's creative director Katy England was responsible for the show's overall styling, Eugene Souleiman styled hair, and Charlotte Tilbury styled make-up, which was kept minimal and neutrally toned. Gainsbury & Whiting oversaw production, and John Gosling was responsible for soundtrack design. Joseph Bennett returned to handle set design.

Gosling's soundtrack incorporates songs from the 1993 film The Piano, scored by Michael Nyman; Scottish bagpipes and drums, various punk rock tracks, and a sound effect of howling wind. McQueen intended to use a track commissioned from Nyman for the finale, but dropped it in favour of a song from the soundtrack of the 1993 film Schindler's List. (Note: The song, called "Lee's Sarabande: Dealing for the Sarabande", went unreleased until it was used in the 2018 documentary film McQueen.) Scottish historian Murray Pittock wrote that the use of the Schindler's List song "suggested an analogy between Culloden and the Holocaust".

=== Catwalk presentation ===
Excerpt of the illusion of Kate Moss

Audience members entered the space through a large glass pyramid. Seats were arranged around a square stage of rough wood, reminiscent of the wooden stage in his collection No. 13 (Spring/Summer 1999). Another glass pyramid was placed in the centre of the square, leaving a catwalk in which the models walked counter-clockwise. In contrast to Highland Rape, when the models staggered or stalked angrily down the runway, the models in Widows moved in a stoic, upright manner which Gleason described as "the attitude of warrior princesses".

Widows of Culloden comprised fifty-one ensembles across three broad phases, each look worn by a different model. The show opened with dresses, sweaters, and tailored suits in tweeds, Aran knits, and brocades of muted neutral shades. The next phase comprised dark-coloured outfits with a focus on tartan and black leather, followed by a series of black evening gowns sometimes taken as mourning dresses. The final looks were a set of lighter-coloured gowns, some of which were worn with frock coats. The show closed with a Pepper's ghost illusion within the glass pyramid, featuring a life-sized projection of Kate Moss, an English model and friend of McQueen's, wearing a billowing chiffon dress. It was the first fashion show to employ this kind of illusory effect. After the illusion ended, as a curtain call, all the models walked the runway in a parade to the Donna Summer song "Last Dance" (1978), followed by McQueen.

== Significant ensembles ==
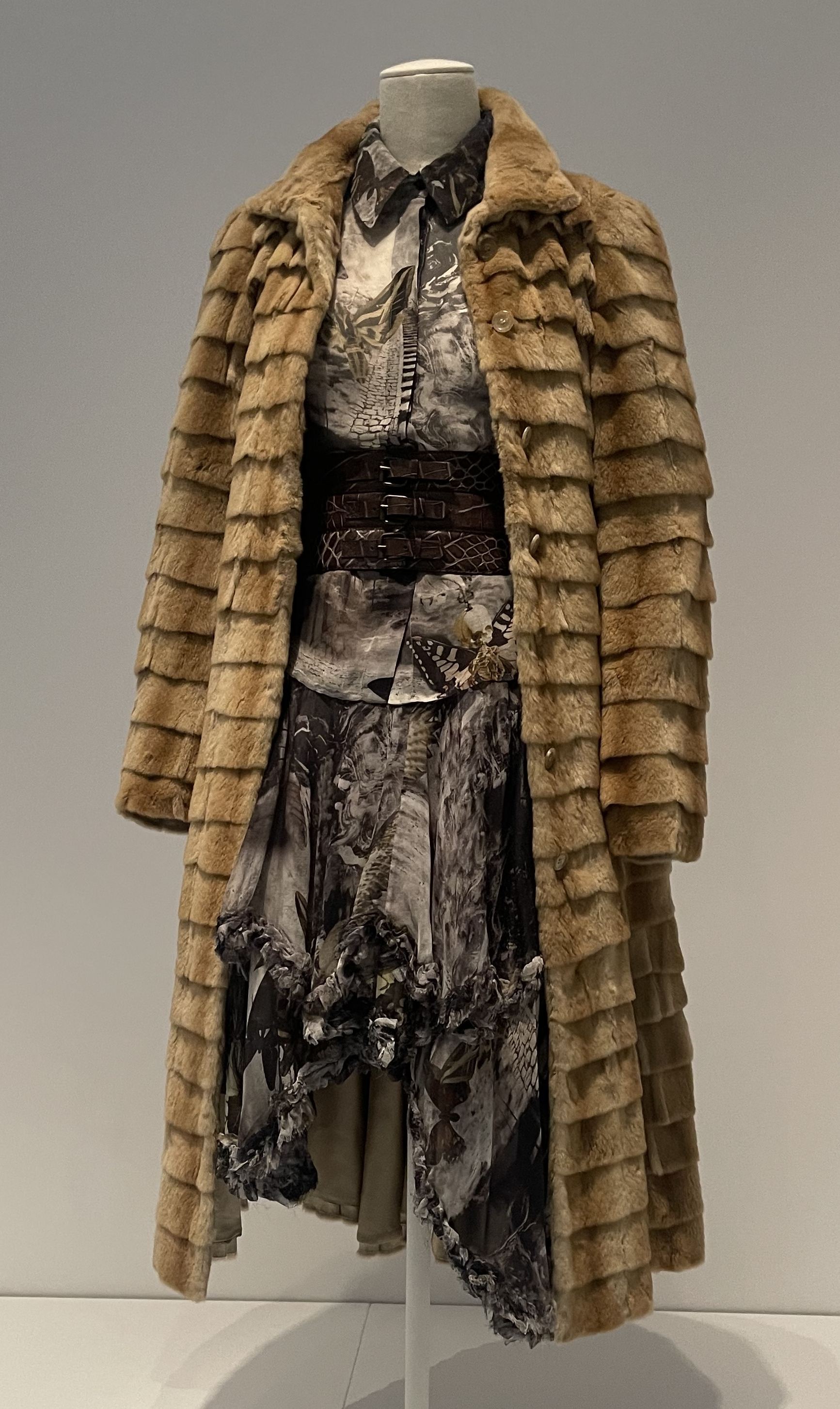
Look 14

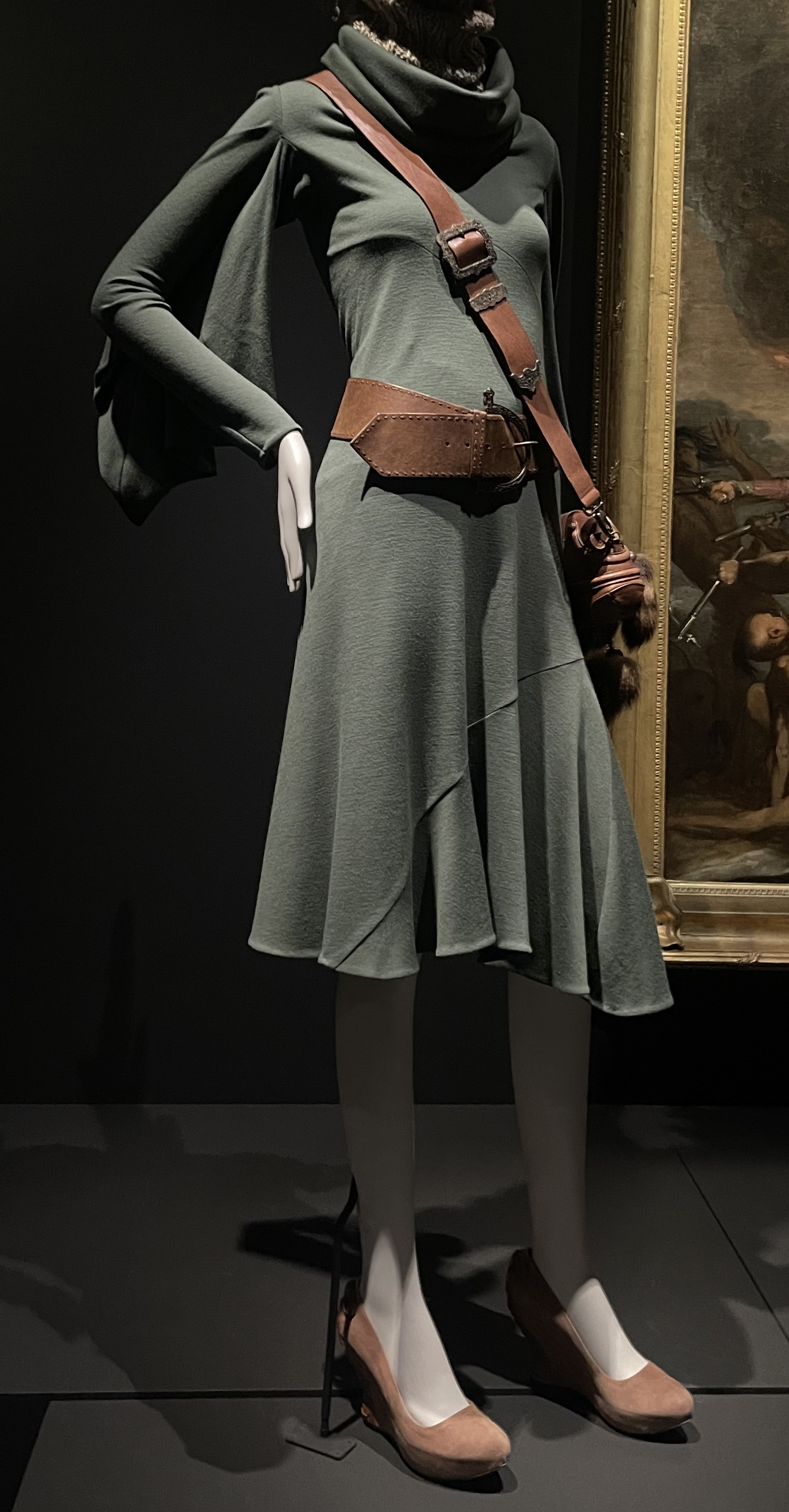
Look 26

Looks from the collection as presented at the exhibition Lee Alexander McQueen: Mind, Mythos, Muse

The show opened with Ukrainian model Snejana Onopka wearing a tweed suit with a fur collar, cream shirt with ruffled front, and tan-coloured leather boots. The look was styled with the "Bird's Nest" headdress, made from a pair of mallard duck wings surrounding a silver bird's nest with blue eggs made from quartz Swarovski crystals, speckled to look like duck eggs. The nest and eggs were created by British jeweller Shaun Leane, while the headpiece was made by Treacy; both of whom were long-time McQueen collaborators.

Look 12 was a full-length dress covered entirely in pheasant feathers. Its long torso and flared lower portion reference the style of gowns from the 1890s. Researcher Kate Bethune described the unique construction of the dress: "each of the feathers has been individually hand-stitched onto a length of ribbon, and then these lengths of ribbon have been stitched onto a net ground". Jess Cartner-Morley of The Guardian called it "meticulously engineered" and likened it to a full-length dress made of razor clam shells from Voss (Spring/Summer 2001). Fashion theorist Jonathan Faiers wrote that the lavish use of game bird feathers evoked Scotland's transformation into a "sports arena for absentee English landlords" in the late Victorian era.

Look 14 was a blouse and midi skirt ensemble of a light material, printed with a collage of realistic images of birds, moths, and skulls. It was paired with a tan fur coat that matched the skirt's hemline, and a wide belt of dark leather at the waist. According to textile curators Clarissa M. Esguerra and Michaela Hansen, the print represented "the collection's themes of nature, metamorphosis, and memento mori".

Look 33 was a one-shouldered tartan dress with tulle underskirt, styled with an undershirt of sheer fabric with rose designs in black, creating an illusion of arm and chest tattoos. The model's waist was cinched by a large belt in dark leather with a Celtic buckle. Roses paired with plaid was a combination used on some Jacobite clothing. On the runway, it was styled with the "Bird Skull" headpiece, which featured black feathers and a silver-case eagle skull set with dark Swarovski crystals.

Brazilian model Raquel Zimmermann wore Look 47, one of the collection's most-discussed ensembles, a full-length ivory gown in silk tulle and lace with an antlered headdress. The flowers from the lace were individually cut and hand-sewn to the tulle. The dress ended in a fishtail hem with a tumble of lace ruffles set on the bias; Watt noted a similarity to dresses in the paintings of French artist James Tissot. For the headpiece, a £2,000 piece of hand-embroidered lace was draped over and pierced by a pair of translucent white Perspex antlers to form a veil. The gown was based in part on the wedding dress of Sarah Burton, a designer with McQueen's label. Some sources refer to it as a wedding dress, but it has also been called the Widow's Weeds, after the Victorian term for women's mourning clothing. McQueen previously employed a similar headpiece using antlers and black lace in Dante (Autumn/Winter 1996), which reappeared in his 2004 retrospective show Black.

Look 48 was a flowing gown in off-white chiffon, worn by Australian model Gemma Ward, with butterflies placed in the hair as accessories. Both Judith Watt and fashion journalist Dana Thomas described it as an evolution of the oyster dress from Irere (Spring/Summer 2003), which was inspired by Galliano's shellfish dress. Cartner-Morley connected the use of butterflies to the final showpiece of Voss, in which artist Michelle Olley was "besieged by giant moths".

== Reception ==
=== Contemporary ===
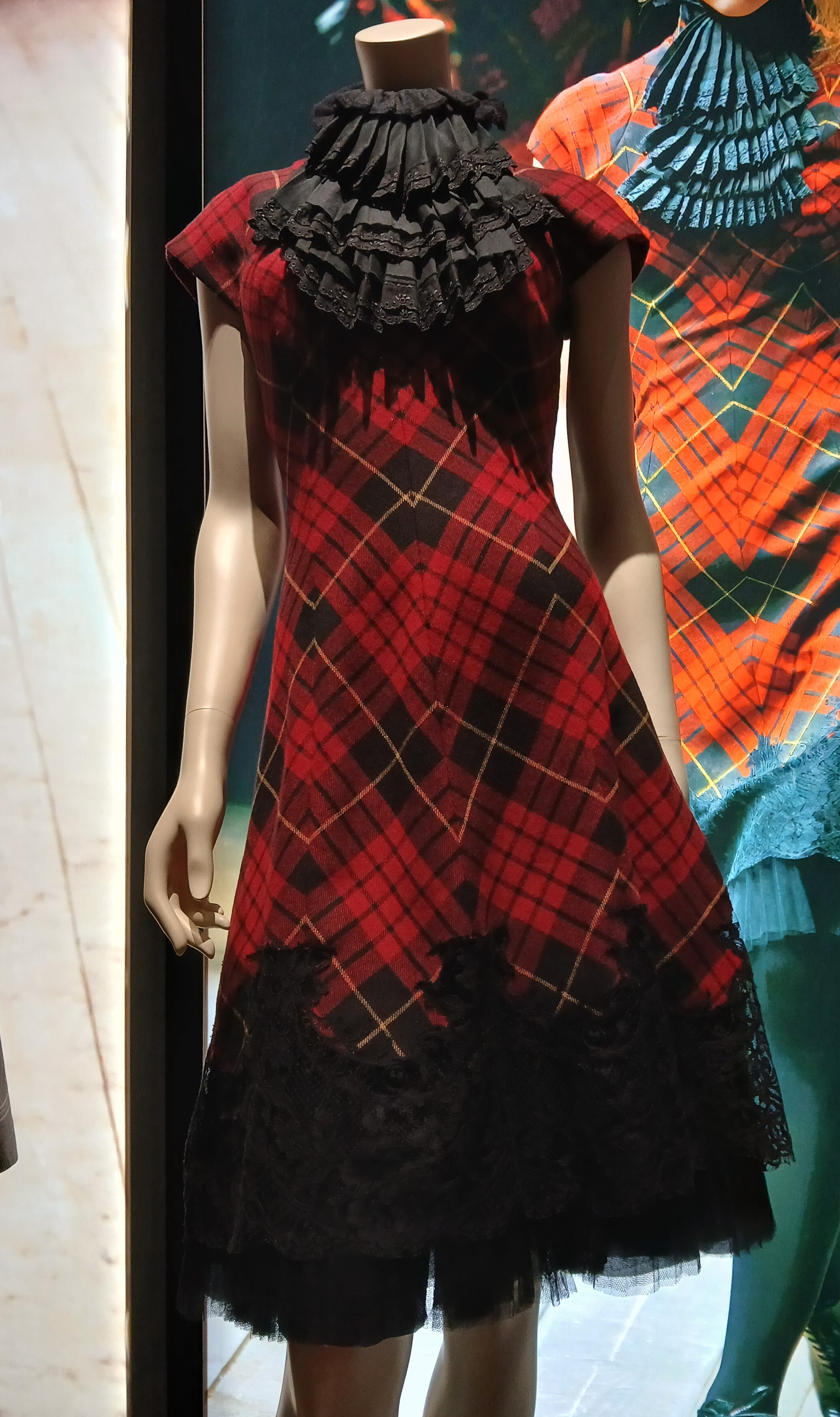
Look 30 at the exhibit accompanying the House of McQueen play, 2025

Contemporary reviews were highly positive. McQueen received a standing ovation at the runway show, a rarity in fashion. Reviewers identified McQueen's tailoring as one of the collection's strongest features. The illusion of Kate Moss dress was regarded as the highlight of the runway show. Women's Wear Daily named Widows one of their top ten collections for the Fall 2006 season. It had the highest pageviews at Style.com for any major collection that season, with 1.7 million. Robert Polet, then chairman of Gucci Group, the parent company for McQueen's label, reportedly cried "bravo!" upon seeing it and ran backstage to congratulate McQueen. Elizabeth McMeekin of The Glasgow Herald suggested the collection had helped drive a trend for Scottish-inspired fashion that season.

Many reviews noted that the collection was both artistic and commercially viable. McQueen did not always achieve this balance – his designs were notorious for being unwearable – so critics felt this was a positive development for his brand. According to Jonathan Akeroyd, then CEO of the Alexander McQueen brand, the looks chosen for the runway "represented about half of what was available" for sale from the collection. Akeroyd reported that sales were strong for the collection and credited the theatrical runway show for driving brand awareness. Writing in the International Herald Tribune, fashion journalist Suzy Menkes concurred, calling the collection's eveningwear "a brand image-maker". Several of the evening gowns were suitable for ordering as custom bridal gowns.

Writing for Vogue, Sarah Mower called it a "timely reconfirmation of McQueen's unique powers as a showman-designer". For The Daily Telegraph, Hilary Alexander said that it "restored the true spirit of the romantic renegade to the catwalk". Lisa Armstrong at The Times wrote that "almost every item was a showstopper but also eminently wearable", although she called the Moss illusion "unspeakably cheesy". According to Susannah Frankel at The Independent, the show was "a return to the unbridled spectacle and raw power with which he made his name", citing its "juxtaposition of fragility and strength, masculinity and femininity".

=== Retrospective ===
The collection is viewed favourably in retrospect. In a 2011 interview with Vogue, Sarah Burton, who succeeded McQueen as the label's head after he died in 2010, described Widows as one of his most iconic collections. In 2012, Judith Watt called the sculptural aspects of some designs close to the "purist cutting of Cristóbal Balenciaga", a Spanish designer known for technical precision and unique silhouettes. Dana Thomas said that Widows represented a "Best of McQueen in the 1990s" in her 2015 book Gods and Kings, writing that many ensembles appeared to be revisions of McQueen's own earlier designs. That same year, I-D deemed the Widow's Weeds and the Kate Moss illusion as some of the defining moments of McQueen's career. British fashion curator Claire Wilcox described Widows in 2016 as a "masterly, romantic collection". Edinburgh-based journalists Caroline Young and Ann Martin wrote that the collection's slim-fit tailored tartan suits "presented the designer's refined craftsmanship at its very best". Speaking in 2020, author Vixy Rae said "it had a focus of extreme technicality matched with richness of imagery with ideas taken directly from Scottish costume".

== Analysis ==
=== Highland Rape and Scottish culture ===
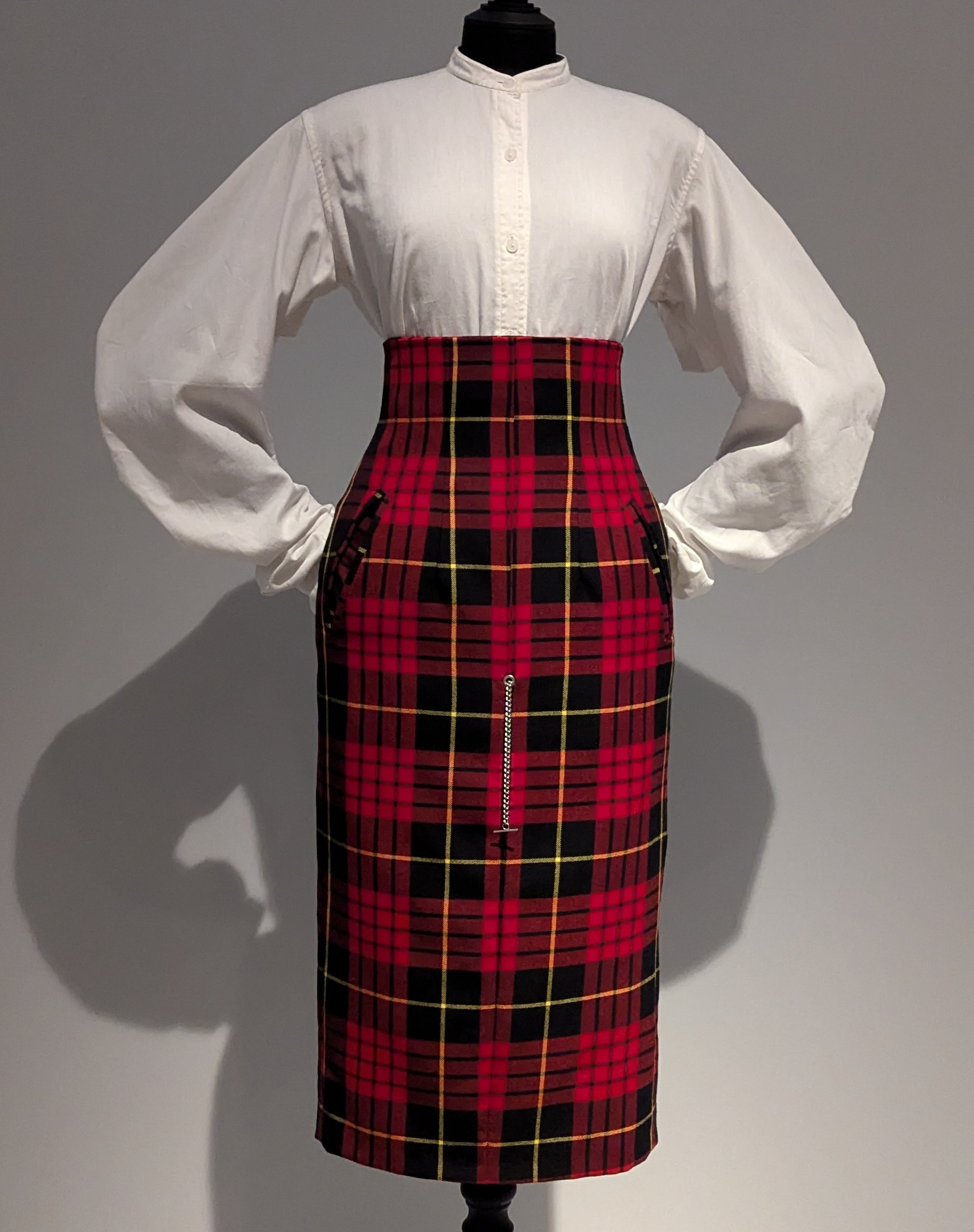
Tartan skirt from Highland Rape; note watch chain detail at crotch level of skirt

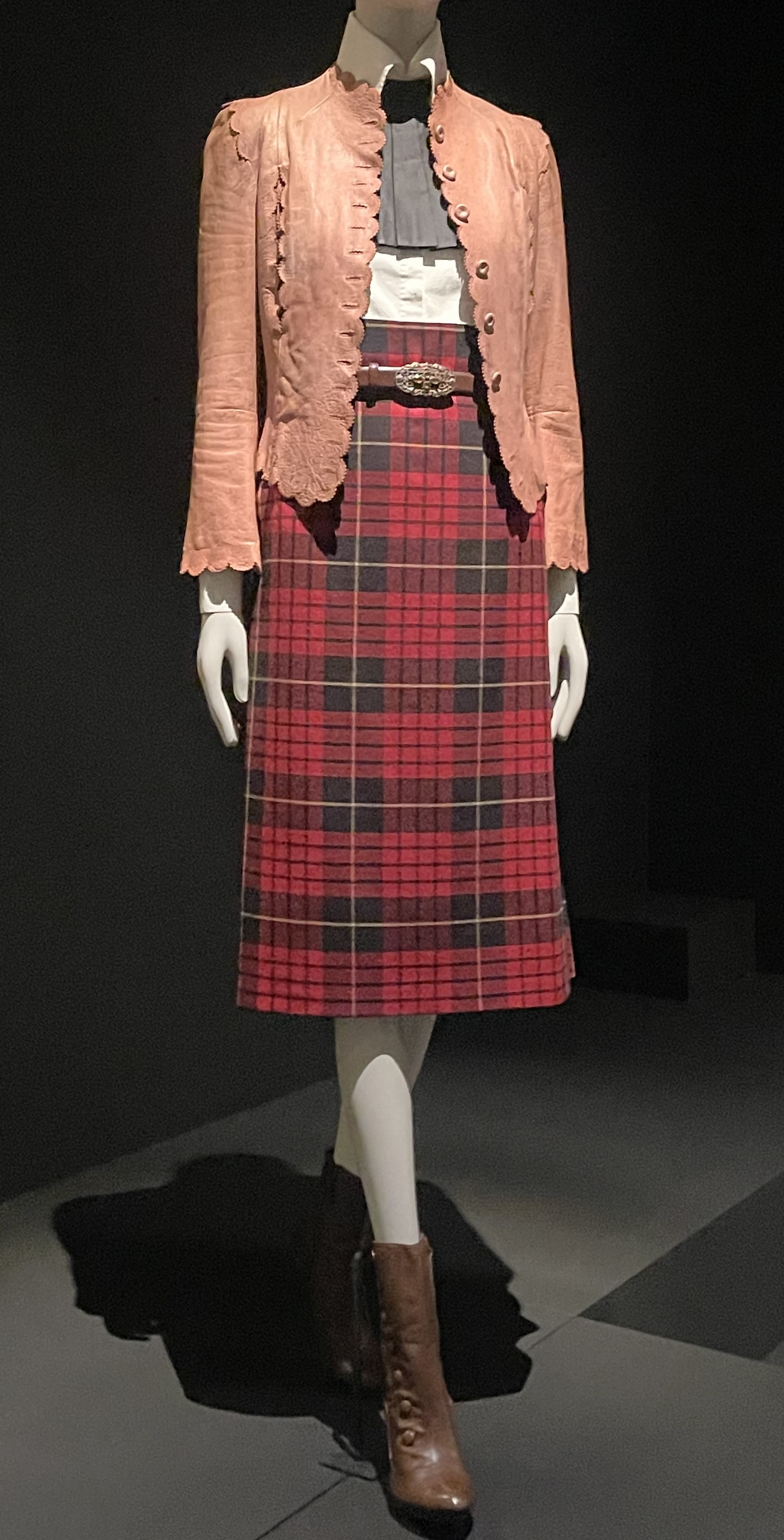
Look 25 from Widows

Comparison of a tartan look from each collection

Widows served as a counterpart to Highland Rape, which was also heavily inspired by Scottish culture. In comparison, Widows has been described as less angry and more reflective. McQueen himself reflected that Widows displayed a more positive view of Scotland, and related the difference to his own mental health, saying "I'm in a much clearer head space now than I was when I did the Highland." The collections were discussed together in a 2014 BBC Alba documentary, McQueen of Scots, which explored McQueen's Scottish heritage and its influence on his designs.

Art historian Ghislaine Wood wrote that the "two collections provided contrasting but cathartic narratives on specific historical events ... and in many ways they reflect the complexity and drama of McQueen's vision". Authors Katherine Gleason and Ana Finel Honigman, writing separately, both felt that the use of tartan in Widows had evolved compared to Highland Rape. Gleason felt that the tartan items in Widows were "more polished, softened with ruffles and embroidery", while Honigman called them "more structured and elegant". To Lisa Armstrong, the restrained nature of Widows, compared to the overt political rage of Highland Rape, was a sign of maturity. Murray Pittock viewed both collections as part of the evolution and worldwide dissemination of tartan since the 1990s.

While softer than Highland Rape, Widows is nonetheless interpreted as a statement about the appropriation of Scottish culture in a wider British context. McQueen's use of tartan in Widows, and the anglicised aspects of the designs, has been viewed as an exploration of the commodification of tartan in high fashion and British culture. Pittock noted that the wide-ranging visual elements of Widows "symbolically commented on the destruction, misprision and exploitative reinterpretation of Scotland for a global audience". For American fashion editor Robin Givhan, the use of tartan "hinted at the rebellion of the punk movement without embracing its anger".

=== Autobiography and historicism ===
McQueen's work was highly autobiographical: he incorporated elements of his memories, feelings, and fixations into his designs and runway shows. Widows, with its emotional focus on both McQueen's and Scotland's history, is generally regarded as one of his most personal collections. Deborah Bell, a professor of costume design, cited curator Andrew Bolton in noting that the "romantic version of historic narrative" from Highland Rape and Widows was "profoundly autobiographical" for McQueen, and suggests this is the reason that it was so impactful. Fashion theorists Paul Jobling, Philippa Nesbitt, and Angelene Wong called the collection "a personal reckoning with [McQueen's] own past", particularly of his relationships with his mother, sister, and Isabella Blow. Women's Wear Daily noted that "the clothes seemed perfectly to describe McQueen's own eccentric point of view".

Historical references are a major component of The Widows of Culloden, resulting in critical discussion over whether the collection is modernist or historicist. Cultural theorist Monika Seidl discussed Widows as a collection in the vein of Romanticism, a 19th-century movement which emphasised emotion and glorification of the past. She cites it as an example of fashion that "self-confidently plays around with time when fragments from the past are blatantly and visibly reactivated as the new look of the moment". Cathy Horyn of The New York Times argues that McQueen was "a storyteller", which positioned him as anti-modernist. She criticised the historical elements in Widows as an unnecessary obstacle between McQueen and his designs. Historian Jack Gann argued that, in effect, it was both: the modern and historical elements combined to show that "perception of our place in time is simultaneously of multiple eras".

Costume curator Lilia Destin noted that the collection subverted typical historical narratives by decentring warriors in favour of their widows, and wrote that it "awards their ghosts a sense of transhistorical agency through memory". Jobling, Nesbitt, and Wong argued that McQueen's description of Widows as more "triumphant" than Highland Rape actually indicates that the widows are celebrating, not mourning, the deaths of their husbands. Historian Timothy Campbell wrote about Highland Rape and Widows in the coda to his 2016 book Historical Style, describing them as counter-arguments to the notion that traumatic events in history must be experienced only in a state of grief. In Campbell's words, "McQueen suggests, Culloden must first be resurrected or remade as something other than tragedy in order to be historically impactful".

=== Gothic elements ===
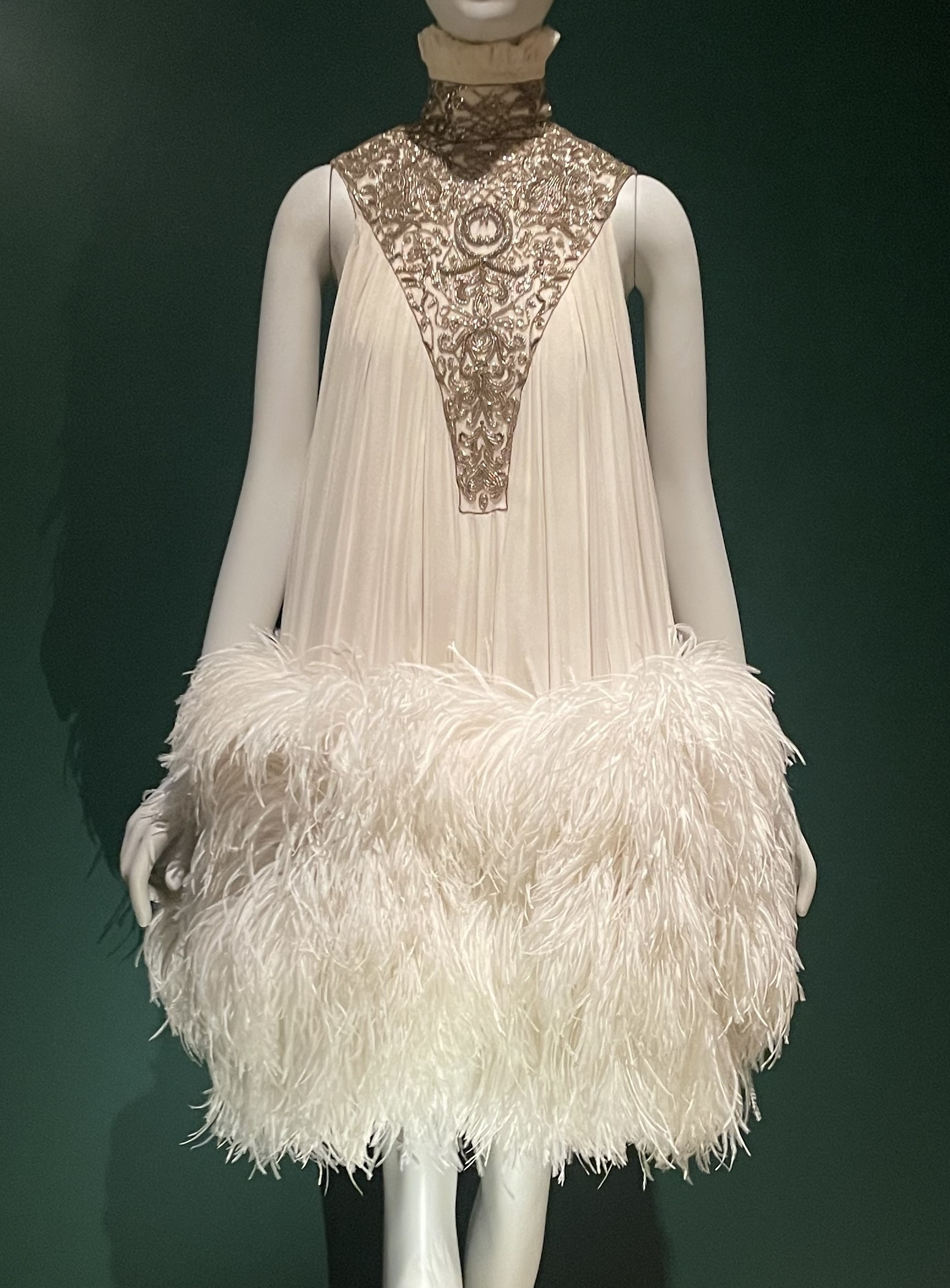
Variation on Look 7 at Mind, Mythos, Muse

Critics have described The Widows of Culloden as an exploration of Gothic literary tropes through fashion, and some have compared it to specific works of classic literature. Gothic fiction, as an offshoot of Romantic literature, emphasises feelings of the sublime and the melancholy, but is set apart by its focus on fear and death. It is distinguished from other supernatural genres by its focus on the present as a state inevitably haunted by the past: literally, in the form of ghosts, as well as metaphorically, through memories and secrets.

In the view of theorist Robert McCaffrey, Widows exemplified melancholy – in the Gothic sense of "tensions between beauty and heartache" – through its visual staging. The stoic performance of the models represented a dignified grief that he likened to "visions of gothic heroines stalking the candle-lit corridors of an ancient castle". McCaffrey called the illusion of Kate Moss an example of highly staged melancholy, with every element contributing to the audience's emotional involvement. Kate Bethune presented a similar analysis, noting that the collection's sense of melancholy was "consolidated in its memorable finale". For Faiers, the models, and especially the Moss illusion, represented "the ghosts of the past unable to contend with the march of fashionable progress". The Bird's Nest headdress and the Bird Skull headpiece from Looks 1 and 33 respectively have been discussed as a set which represents the cycle of life and death, and the fragility of beauty.

Discussing McQueen's proclivity for the gothic more generally, the professor of literature Catherine Spooner highlighted his fascination with dark aspects of history. She noted that in several of his most historical collections, including Highland Rape, Widows, and In Memory of Elizabeth Howe, Salem, 1692 (Autumn/Winter 2007), the "distressed fabric; screen-printed photographs; fragments of historical dress disassembled and reordered" reflect the disturbing aspects of history he drew on for inspiration. Author Chloe Fox wrote that McQueen had "mined the refined sense of an aristocratic past" to produce the collection. Literature professor Fiona Robertson found that McQueen's Scottish collections and the historical novels of Scottish writer Walter Scott epitomised the Scottish style of gothic by focusing on the country's "broken and self-alienated national history".

The mood of Widows may be read as part of a shift toward darkness and melancholy as an aesthetic in fashion, which some authors have argued was a response to global turmoil and increased nihilism following the turn of the century. Art historian Bonnie English noted that McQueen was one of a number of major designers, including Karl Lagerfeld, John Galliano, Yohji Yamamoto, and Marc Jacobs, who produced sombre collections for the Fall/Winter 2006 season. In a 2019 New York Times essay discussing the cultural archetype of the melancholy woman, writer Leslie Jamison described Highland Rape and Widows as emblematic of an "aesthetic of suffering" in fashion.

=== White gowns ===
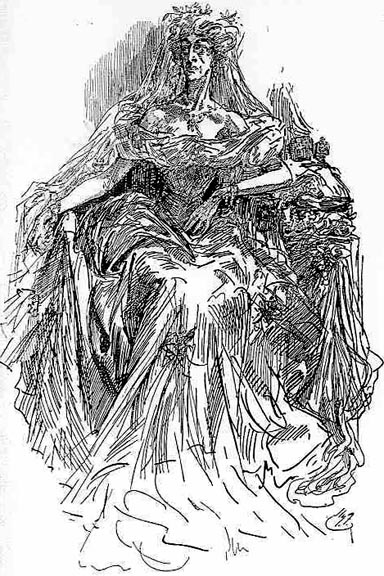
Miss Havisham from Dickens' Great Expectations

The lace gown with veiled antlers – the Widow's Weeds – has provoked significant critical response, much of which focused on the theatrical and animalistic effect created by the headdress. McQueen later said that the look "worked because it looks like she's rammed the piece of lace with her antlers". Lisa Skogh wrote that the veil over the antlers suggested a "dramatic bridal crown". Watt described it as "creating a phantasmagorical hybrid beast-woman". Author Sarah Heaton noted that the antlers "insist on the feminine relationship to the land, nature, and psyche".

Both the antlered gown and the chiffon gown worn by Moss have been analysed as wedding dresses. From this perspective, the antlered gown has been read as especially ambiguous: the veil can be seen as entrapping, protecting, or concealing the bride who wears it. It has drawn comparisons to the wedding dress obsessively worn by the spinster Miss Havisham in the novel Great Expectations (1861).

Heaton, whose work focuses on the intersection between fashion and literature, described these two long white dresses as "revisionist" wedding gowns that evoke the Gothic to subvert its limitations. In her view, the lace veil uplifted on the antlers of McQueen's ensemble is reminiscent of Miss Havisham's wedding veil, but where Miss Havisham's veil is shroud-like and grotesque, the veil of McQueen's design "suggests the strength of femininity". The illusion of Moss, on the other hand, evokes the Gothic trope of the barefoot "mad woman"; normally this figure would be confined to an attic or asylum, but again McQueen subverts the expectation by displaying her to the public, making her ephemeral and uncontained.

Cultural theorist Monika Seidl considered the same pair of gowns from a more critical perspective in 2009, arguing that they framed their wearers "as trophy and ... as victim". For Seidl, far from presenting feminine strength, the antlers in combination with the gamekeepers' clothing referenced earlier in the show evoked an image of the bride as a hunting trophy. She viewed the Moss illusion as presenting a contained "Wiedergänger" or vengeful spirit. However, she described both dresses as persuasive in the way they "destabilise the notion of a bride".

=== Other analyses ===
The look of the feathered outfits has been compared to the Harpy, a bird-woman from Greek mythology.

Post-humanist theorist Justyna Stępień argued that McQueen's use of unusual silhouettes and structures, particularly in Widows and Plato's Atlantis (Spring/Summer 2010), provoked an emotional reaction in the audience and forced them to reconsider their perception of the human body.

Analysing McQueen's tendency to incorporate and reinterpret styles from various cultures, Esguerra and Hansen compared the use of Highland dress in Widows to the interpretation of Islamic dress in Eye (Spring/Summer 2000). They found that Widows succeeded because of McQueen's connection to Scottish culture, enabling him to present a collection with a strong narrative. In contrast, they felt that Eye suffered from a lack of personal knowledge, and came across as insensitive to the diversity of Islamic culture.

In an analysis of fashion as a performative intersection of sex and gender, Paul Jobling, Philippa Nesbitt, and Angelene Wong examined Widows as a "poetic text" relating to McQueen's identity as a gay man, and his ideal of feminine empowerment through fashion. They examined McQueen's use of feathers as a subversion and expansion of typical gender roles which see men as predators and women as prey. In their analysis, the models resemble bird-women in mythology, such as the Greek Harpy and the Russian Gamayun, who are beautiful yet dangerous threats to "phallocentric male power". McQueen's use of animal motifs thus allows women to explore different types of femininity and female power, without being constrained to any particular binary. They further argue that McQueen's combination of "masculine" tartan with "feminine" fabrics like lace is another subversion of the gender binary, allowing the widows to step into a liberated role following the deaths of their husbands.

Writer Cassandra Atherton described using several McQueen collections, including Widows, in a university-level creative writing course to teach a connection between poetry and fashion, particularly how one can inspire the other. Literature professor Mary Beth Tegan described using Highland Rape and Widows together in 2021 as a teaching aid to engage university students in the short story "The Highland Widow" by Walter Scott (1827). She found that the "affective glamour of Gothic tale and fashion spectacle ... roused my students' interest and sustained their reflections" about both the story and the fashion.

== Legacy ==
Discussing being fitted for the dress by McQueen: "He had these gorgeous hands. And he just worked. And he was quiet and unthinkably shy, didn't look in your eyes much, didn't want to, wasn't interested in engaging; it wasn't important for me to be his friend. You know, he was very concerned about his work."

— Sarah Jessica Parker, speaking to Savage Beauty curator Andrew Bolton, undated.

=== Editorials and celebrity wear ===
Dresses from Widows have appeared in magazine photoshoots and editorials. Gemma Ward wore Look 33 for an editorial fashion shoot in the July 2006 issue of Harper's Bazaar, styled with the Spitfire headpiece from Look 44. Moss wore the original dress from the illusion on the cover of the May 2011 issue of Harper's Bazaar UK. Look 47, The Widow's Weeds, and Look 48, the chiffon dress with butterfly accessories, appeared in "Dark Angel", a 2015 retrospective editorial of McQueen's work in British Vogue by fashion photographer Tim Walker.

Actress Sarah Jessica Parker attended the opening of the 2006 AngloMania: Tradition and Transgression in British Fashion exhibition at the New York Metropolitan Museum of Art (The Met) wearing a version of Look 33 from Widows, the one-shouldered tartan dress. McQueen accompanied her wearing a matching tartan great kilt. Elizabeth McMeekin called it a "chic, tremendously of the-moment" choice.

American singer Lana Del Rey attended the 2024 Met Gala in an Alexander McQueen gown which heavily referenced the Widow's Weeds. Designed by the house's creative director Seán McGirr, Del Rey's dress was a beige corseted gown hand-embroidered with branches made from bronze. She wore a matching headpiece made from natural tree branches draped with a sheer veil, echoing the veil-and-antlers headpiece from the Widow's Weeds.

=== Auctions and ownership ===
The Alexander McQueen brand archive in London retains ownership of several looks from the collection, including the Widow's Weeds and the pheasant feather dress. Swarovski owns the Bird's Nest and Bird Skull headdresses. The Met owns the original Look 33 tartan dress ensemble with the sheer undershirt, as well as Look 30, another tartan dress. The Victoria and Albert Museum (the V&A) in London owns a variant of the Kate Moss dress. The Los Angeles County Museum of Art owns several pieces from the collection. The National Gallery of Victoria (NGV) in Australia owns 14 ensembles and mockups from Widows, including Look 33 and Look 50. The majority of these were gifted by philanthropist Krystyna Campbell-Pretty in 2016 as part of a larger collection.

McQueen's friend Alice Smith auctioned a collection of McQueen memorabilia in 2020; an invitation from The Widows of Culloden sold for $425. Fashion collector Jennifer Zuiker auctioned her McQueen collection in 2020, including at least two pieces from Widows. A tartan dress, Look 30 from the runway show, sold for a reported $9,375, and a floral ballgown, Look 50, sold for a reported $68,750.

=== Museum exhibitions ===
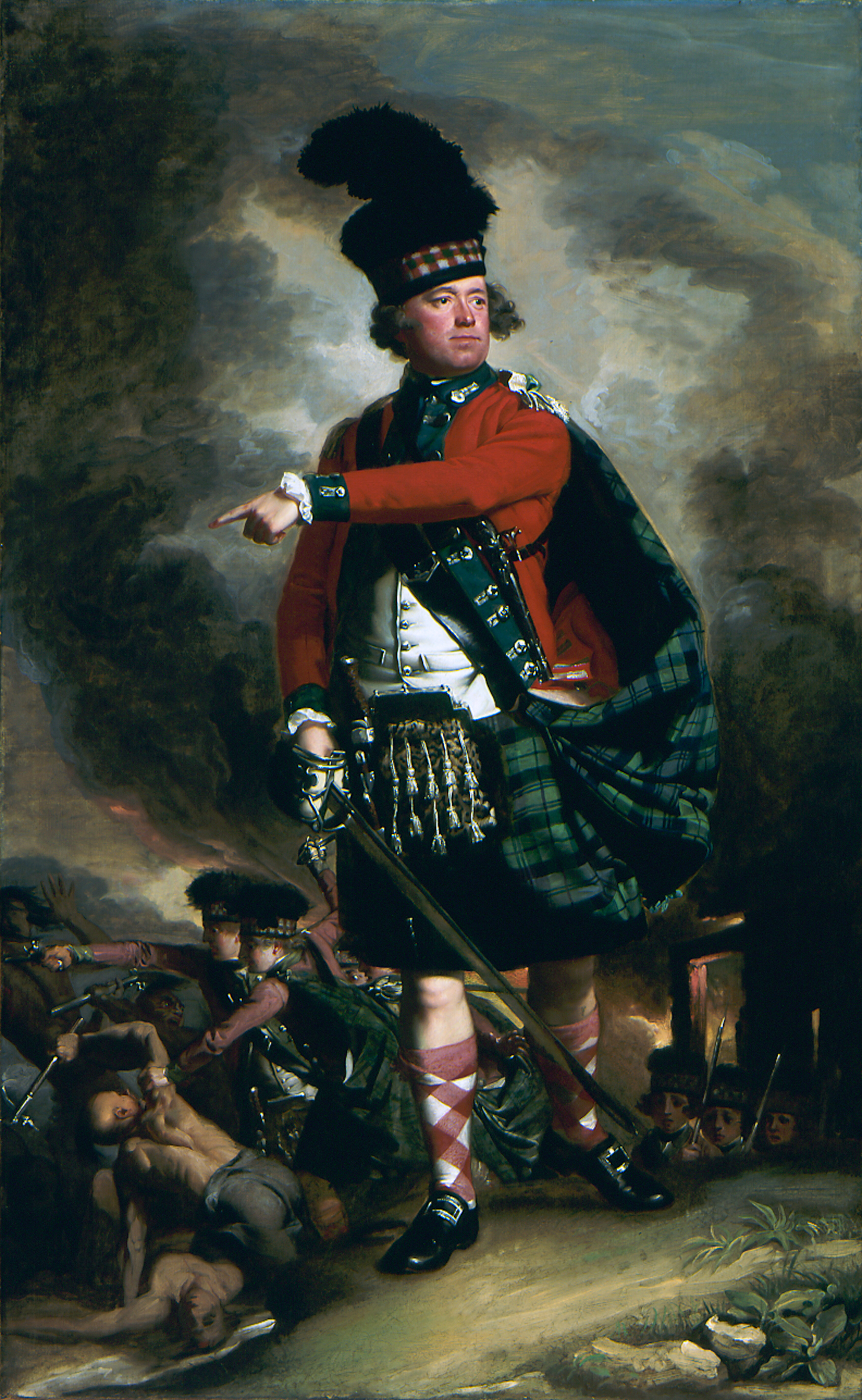
Portrait of Hugh Montgomerie, Later Twelfth Earl of Eglinton, John Singleton Copley (1780)

Several ensembles from Widows – at least five tartan looks, the pheasant feather dress, and the Widow's Weeds – appeared in Alexander McQueen: Savage Beauty, a retrospective exhibition of McQueen's designs shown in 2011 at The Met and in 2015 at the V&A. The Kate Moss illusion made an appearance at both versions of the exhibition. In the original presentation at the Met, the illusion was recreated in miniature, but in the V&A restaging, it was presented in full size in its own room. (Note: In a review of the exhibition, media theorist Johannes Birringer refers to the hologram as "scaled down, in a small dark room", but other sources state that it was full-size compared to the miniature version presented at the Metropolitan Museum.) The NGV displayed the collection donated by Campbell-Pretty in 2019 as the Krystyna Campbell-Pretty Fashion Gift. The exhibition included items from several McQueen collections, including Widows.

Look 50, a floral ballgown, appeared in China: Through the Looking Glass, a 2015 exhibition at The Met. A copy of Look 30 owned by fashion collector Carmen Lomana was the centrepiece of a 2018 exhibition, The Wardrobe of Carmen Lomana, at the Museo del Traje in Madrid. A copy of Look 7 appeared in the 2018 exhibition A Queen Within: Adorned Archetypes at the New Orleans Museum of Art.

Items from the collection appeared in the 2022 exhibition Lee Alexander McQueen: Mind, Mythos, Muse, first shown at the Los Angeles County Museum of Art and later in expanded form at the National Gallery of Victoria. Widows was placed in the Fashioned Narratives section of the exhibition, which highlighted collections focused on original and historical stories.

Mind, Mythos, Muse compared one sleeveless dress with high-necked ruff and gold beading from the Widows collection to the ruffed and embroidered outfit worn by King Louis XIII of France in the painting Portrait of Louis XIII, King of France as a Boy by Flemish painter Frans Pourbus II (c. 1616). Two tartan ensembles from the runway show were compared to a 1780 portrait of Hugh Montgomerie, 12th Earl of Eglinton by John Singleton Copley. During the time the portrait was painted, the wearing of tartan in Scotland was prohibited, except for soldiers and veterans, by the Dress Act 1746. In Copley's painting, Montgomerie, wearing tartan, poses triumphantly over defeated Cherokee warriors. In reality, Montgomerie was not present at the battle being depicted, which occurred during the Anglo-Cherokee War in 1760; nor was it a British victory. The exhibition presents the Widows outfits as a counterpoint to the colonialist narrative in the portrait.

== Bibliography ==
=== Books ===
- Bell, Deborah (2014). "Masquerades of Alexander McQueen and John Galliano". In Bell, Deborah (ed.). Masquerade: Essays on Tradition and Innovation Worldwide. Jefferson, North Carolina: McFarland & Company. pp. 188–195. ISBN 978-0-7864-7646-6. Archived from the original on 14 January 2023.
- Birch, Dinah, ed. (2009). "Gothic fiction". The Oxford Companion to English Literature (7th ed.). Oxford: Oxford University Press. pp. 429–430. ISBN 978-0191735066. Archived from the original on 14 January 2023.
- Bolton, Andrew (2011). Alexander McQueen: Savage Beauty. New York City: Metropolitan Museum of Art. ISBN 978-1-58839-412-5. Archived from the original on 22 April 2023.
- Bolton, Andrew (2015). China: Through the Looking Glass. New York City: Metropolitan Museum of Art. ISBN 9780300211122.
- Bowles, Hamish (2014). Vogue & the Metropolitan Museum of Art Costume Institute: Parties, Exhibitions, People (1st ed.). New York: Condé Nast. ISBN 978-1-4197-1424-5. OCLC 871511830.
- Campbell, Timothy (2016). Historical Style: Fashion and the New Mode of History, 1740–1830. Philadelphia: University of Pennsylvania Press. ISBN 978-0-8122-9304-3. Archived from the original on 14 January 2023.
- Damrosch, Leopold (1985). Adventures in English Literature. Orlando, Florida: Holt McDougal. pp. 405–424. ISBN 0153350458.
- Deniau, Anne (2012). Love Looks Not with the Eyes: Thirteen Years with Lee Alexander McQueen. New York City: Abrams Books. ISBN 978-1-61312-415-4. OCLC 785067241. Archived from the original on 27 April 2023.
- English, Bonnie (2013). A Cultural History of Fashion in the 20th and 21st Centuries: From Catwalk to Sidewalk. London: Bloomsbury Academic. ISBN 978-0-85785-136-9. Archived from the original on 14 January 2023.
- Esguerra, Clarissa M.; Hansen, Michaela (2022). Lee Alexander McQueen: Mind, Mythos, Muse. New York City: Delmonico Books. ISBN 978-1-63681-018-8. OCLC 1289986708.
- Evans, Caroline; Vaccari, Alessandra (2020). "Time in Fashion: An Introductory Essay". Time in Fashion: Industrial, Antilinear and Uchronic Temporalities. London: Bloomsbury Visual Arts. pp. 28–29. ISBN 978-1-350-14696-9. Archived from the original on 14 January 2023.
- Fairer, Robert; Wilcox, Claire (2016). Alexander McQueen: Unseen. New Haven, Connecticut: Yale University Press. ISBN 978-0-300-22267-8. OCLC 946216643.
- Fox, Chloe (2012). Vogue on: Alexander McQueen. Vogue on Designers. London: Quadrille Publishing. ISBN 978-1849491136. OCLC 828766756. Archived from the original on 5 January 2023.
- Franck, Kaja (2020). "The Wilderness". In Bloom, Clive (ed.). The Palgrave Handbook of Contemporary Gothic. London: Springer Nature. ISBN 978-3-030-33136-8. Archived from the original on 14 January 2023.
- Gleason, Katherine (2012). Alexander McQueen: Evolution. New York City: Race Point Publishing. ISBN 978-1-61058-837-9. Archived from the original on 5 January 2023.
- Haye, Amy de la (2020). "The Rose: 'Flowers That Are Looked At'". The Rose in Fashion: Ravishing. New Haven, Connecticut: Yale University Press. ISBN 978-0-300-25008-4. Archived from the original on 14 January 2023.
- Heaton, Sarah (2017). "Wayward Wedding Dresses". In Whitehead, Julia; Petrov, Gudrun D. (eds.). Fashioning Horror. London: Bloomsbury Visual Arts. pp. 83–100. doi:10.5040/9781350036215.ch-004. ISBN 978-1350036215. Archived from the original on 14 January 2023.
- Hogle, Jerrold E., ed. (2002). "Introduction". The Cambridge Companion to Gothic Fiction. Cambridge Companions to Literature. Cambridge University Press. doi:10.1017/ccol0521791243. ISBN 978-0-521-79124-3. Archived from the original on 14 January 2023.
- Honigman, Ana Finel (2021). What Alexander McQueen Can Teach You About Fashion. London: Frances Lincoln. ISBN 978-0-7112-5906-5. Archived from the original on 11 May 2024.
- Jobling, Paul; Nesbitt, Philippa; Wong, Angelene (2022). Fashion, Identity, Image. London: Bloomsbury Visual Arts. ISBN 978-1-350-18323-0. Archived from the original on 12 January 2023.
- Khan, Nathalie (2013). "Fashion as Mythology: Considering the Legacy of Alexander McQueen". In Bruzzi, Stella; Gibson, Pamela Church (eds.). Fashion Cultures Revisited. London: Routledge. pp. 261–271. ISBN 978-0415680059.
- Knox, Kristin (2010). Alexander McQueen: Genius of a Generation. London: A&C Black. ISBN 978-1-4081-3223-4. Archived from the original on 5 January 2023.
- Loschek, Ingrid (2009). When Clothes Become Fashion: Design and Innovation Systems. Oxford: Berg Publishers. ISBN 978-0-85785-144-4. Archived from the original on 5 January 2023.
- Mackrell, Alice (2005). Art and Fashion: the Impact of Art on Fashion and Fashion on Art. London: Sterling Publishing. ISBN 978-0-7134-8873-9. Archived from the original on 14 January 2023.
- Murdoch, Lydia (2013). Daily Life of Victorian Women. Santa Barbara, California: Greenwood Publishing Group. ISBN 978-0-313-38499-8. Archived from the original on 14 January 2023.
- Pittock, Murray (2016). Culloden: Great Battles. Oxford: Oxford University Press. ISBN 978-0-19-164069-8.
- Pittock, Murray (2022). Scotland: The Global History: 1603 to the Present. Yale: Yale University Press. ISBN 978-0-300-26896-6. Archived from the original on 14 January 2023.
- Robertson, Fiona (2017). "Gothic Scott". In Davison, Carol Margaret; Germanà, Monica (eds.). Scottish Gothic: An Edinburgh Companion. Edinburgh: Edinburgh University Press. pp. 102–114. ISBN 978-1-4744-0820-2. Archived from the original on 14 January 2023.
- Royle, Trevor (2017). Culloden. London: Abacus. ISBN 978-0-349-13865-7.
- Seidl, Monika (2009). "British Fashion and Romanticism Today: Where the Present Dreams the Past Future". In Eckstein, Lars (ed.). Romanticism Today: Selected Papers from the Tübingen Conference of the German Society for English Romanticism. Trier, Germany: WVT Wissenschaftlicher Verlag Trier. ISBN 978-3-86821-147-4. OCLC 427321505. Archived from the original on 14 January 2023.
- Snodgrass, Mary Ellen (2014). Encyclopedia of Gothic Literature. New York City: Infobase Publishing. ISBN 978-1-4381-0911-4. Archived from the original on 14 January 2023.
- Stępień, Justyna (2020). "'Savage Beauties'. Alexander McQueen's performance of posthuman bodies". In Ferrero-Regis, Tiziana; Lindquist, Marissa (eds.). Staging Fashion: The Fashion Show and Its Spaces. London: Bloomsbury Publishing. pp. 71–82. ISBN 978-1-350-10184-5. Archived from the original on 14 January 2023.
- Thomas, Dana (2015). Gods and Kings: The Rise and Fall of Alexander McQueen and John Galliano. New York City: Penguin Publishing. ISBN 978-1-101-61795-3. OCLC 951153602.
- Valentine, Genevieve (2019). "Savage Beauty: Alexander McQueen". In Boskovich, Desirina (ed.). Lost Transmissions: The Secret History of Science Fiction and Fantasy. New York City: Abrams Books. pp. 219–220. ISBN 978-1-68335-498-7. Archived from the original on 14 January 2023.
- Watt, Judith (2012). Alexander McQueen: The Life and the Legacy. New York City: Harper Design. ISBN 978-1-84796-085-6. OCLC 892706946.
- Wilcox, Claire, ed. (2015). Alexander McQueen. New York City: Abrams Books. ISBN 978-1-4197-1723-9. OCLC 891618596.
  - Faiers, Jonathan. "Nature Boy". In Wilcox (2015), pp. 123–137.
  - Skogh, Lisa. "Museum of the Mind". In Wilcox (2015), pp. 178–188.
  - Spooner, Catherine. "A Gothic Mind". In Wilcox (2015), pp. 141–158.
  - Wood, Ghislaine. "Clan MacQueen". In Wilcox (2015), pp. 51–56.
- Wilson, Andrew (2015). Alexander McQueen: Blood Beneath the Skin. New York City: Simon and Schuster. ISBN 978-1-4767-7674-3.
- Yeo, Su-Anne (2020). "Summoning the Ghosts of Early Cinema and Victorian Entertainment: Kate Moss and Savage Beauty at the Victoria and Albert Museum". In Menotti, Gabriel; Crisp, Virginia (eds.). Practices of Projection: Histories and Technologies. Oxford: Oxford University Press. pp. 136–154. ISBN 978-0-19-093411-8. Archived from the original on 14 January 2023.
- Young, Caroline; Martin, Ann (2017). Tartan + Tweed. London: Frances Lincoln Limited. ISBN 978-0-7112-3822-0. OCLC 947020251.

=== Journals ===
- Atherton, Cassandra (2012). "The Haunting: Poetry and Fashion in the Creative Writing Workshop". Writing on the Edge. 23 (1): 47–53. ISSN 1064-6051. JSTOR 43157472.
- Birringer, Johannes (2016). "Performance In the Cabinet of Curiosities: Or, The Boy Who Lived in the Tree". PAJ: A Journal of Performance and Art. 38 (3): 27–28. doi:10.1162/PAJJ_a_00331. ISSN 1520-281X. JSTOR 26386804. S2CID 57559845.
- Elenowitz-Hess, Caroline (16 April 2022). "Reckoning with Highland Rape: Sexuality, Violence, and Power on the Runway". Fashion Theory. 26 (3): 399–417. doi:10.1080/1362704X.2020.1846325. ISSN 1362-704X. S2CID 229432510.
- McCaffrey, Robert (24 September 2020). "Alexander McQueen: The Sublime and Melancholy". The Fashion Studies Journal. Archived from the original on 21 September 2022.
- Mora, Juliana Luna; Berry, Jess (2 September 2022). "Creative Direction Succession in Luxury Fashion: The Illusion of Immortality at Chanel and Alexander McQueen". Luxury. 9 (2–3): 117–140. doi:10.1080/20511817.2022.2194039. ISSN 2051-1817.
- Ochiagha, Terri (4 March 2019). "The Wardrobe of Carmen Lomana, Museo del Traje, Madrid, February 21, 2018–May 8, 2018". Fashion Theory. 24 (2): 305–312. doi:10.1080/1362704X.2019.1577645. ISSN 1362-704X.
- Tegan, Mary Beth (1 October 2021). "'The Contagion of Her Wretchedness': Rousing Interest in the Highland Widows of Scott and McQueen". Essays in Romanticism. 28 (2): 95. doi:10.3828/eir.2021.28.2.4. ISSN 2049-6702. S2CID 239506478.
