= Illusion of Kate Moss =

2006 Alexander McQueen fashion show film

Excerpt of the illusion of Kate Moss from the runway show of The Widows of Culloden

The illusion of Kate Moss is an art piece first shown at the conclusion of the Alexander McQueen runway show The Widows of Culloden (Autumn/Winter 2006). It consists of a short film of English model Kate Moss dancing slowly while wearing a long, billowing gown of white chiffon, projected life-size within a glass pyramid in the centre of the show's catwalk. Although sometimes referred to as a hologram, the illusion was made using a 19th‑century theatre technique called Pepper's ghost.

McQueen conceived the illusion as a gesture of support for Moss; she was a close friend of his and was embroiled in a drug-related scandal at the time of the Widows show. It is regarded by many critics as the highlight of the Widows runway show, and it has been the subject of a great deal of academic analysis, particularly as a wedding dress and as a memento mori. The illusion appeared in both versions of Alexander McQueen: Savage Beauty, a retrospective exhibition of McQueen's designs.

== Background ==
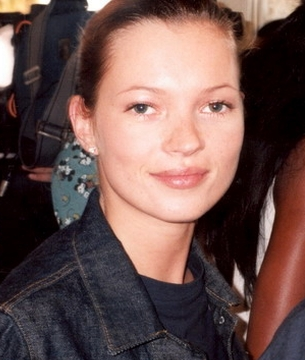
Kate Moss, 2005

British designer Alexander McQueen was known in the fashion industry for dramatic, theatrical fashion shows featuring imaginative, sometimes controversial designs. He was a close friend of English model Kate Moss, who had walked in several of his previous shows, including Bellmer La Poupée (Spring/Summer 1997) and Voss (Spring/Summer 2001). Moss retired from runway modelling in 2004 to focus on advertising contracts and other ventures. In 2005, she became caught up in controversy after images of her allegedly using drugs were leaked to the media, and several companies cancelled lucrative contracts with her.

McQueen actively supported Moss throughout the controversy. He argued that in his opinion, many journalists also regularly used drugs, making their criticism hypocritical. He wore a T-shirt with the words "We love you Kate!" when he appeared at the end of the runway show for Neptune (Spring/Summer 2006). As a further gesture of support, he developed the idea of projecting her into the closing act of upcoming show, The Widows of Culloden (Autumn/Winter 2006), seeking "to show that she was more ethereal, bigger than the situation she was in".

== Illusion ==
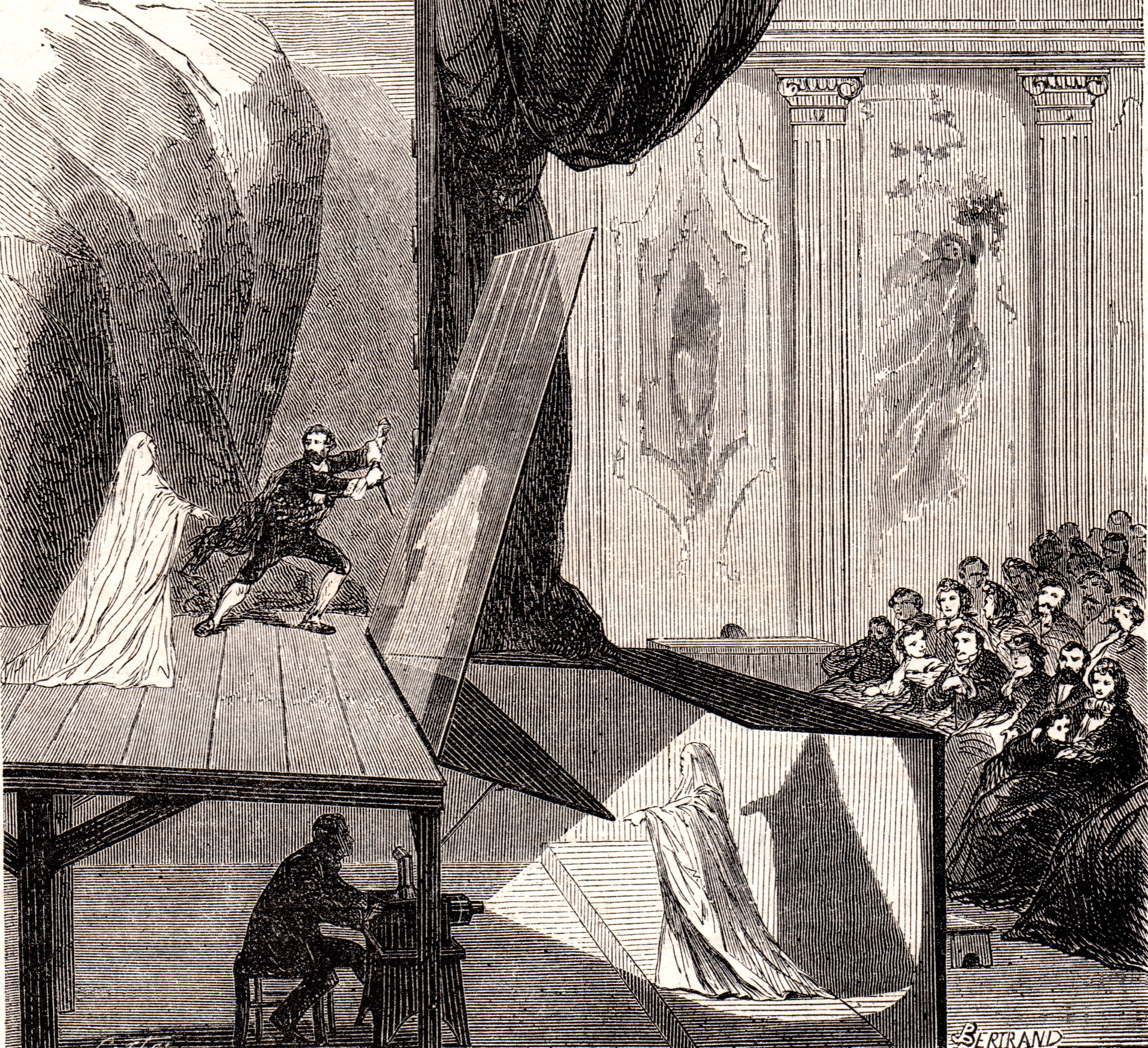
Stage setup for Pepper's ghost. A brightly lit figure out of the audience's sight below the stage is reflected in a pane of glass placed between the performer and the audience. To the audience, it appears as if the ghost is on stage.

The illusion played as the finale of the runway show for The Widows of Culloden on 3 March 2006 at the Palais Omnisports de Paris-Bercy. The stage was formed by a square of rough wood with a large glass pyramid in its centre, leaving a catwalk around the outside for the models to walk. After the final model exited the runway, the lights were dimmed and the illusion was projected within the central pyramid. The illusion, sometimes inaccurately described as a hologram, used a 19th‑century theatre technique called Pepper's ghost to display a life-sized projection of Kate Moss wearing a billowing white chiffon dress. In the Pepper's ghost technique, a brightly lit figure out of sight of the audience is partially reflected on an angled pane of glass, which makes the semi-transparent figure appear to be on the stage.

The illusion was executed as a collaboration between British film director Baillie Walsh, production designer Joseph Bennett, post-production company Glassworks, and production duo Gainsbury & Whiting. Glassworks planned the illusion by creating a computer-generated render of the entire show space, including the seating and the runway. This enabled them to visualise the illusion from multiple viewpoints to confirm that it would look correct no matter where it was viewed from. The performance for Widows was inspired in part by serpentine dance, a type of stage performance from the 1890s that utilised billowing fabric and dramatic lighting, created by dancer Loie Fuller.

Filming the effect was difficult, went over budget and took two hours. Moss was suspended in a harness and wind machines were used to create the movement of her dress. The flowing material made it difficult for the production designers to conceal the edges of the illusion. Because the pyramid was visible to the audience from all angles, it was more challenging to execute than an illusion using only a single field of view. It was the first fashion show to employ this kind of effect; media theorist Jenna Ng speculated that it may have been the first such large-scale 3D projection of a performance.

== Reception and legacy ==
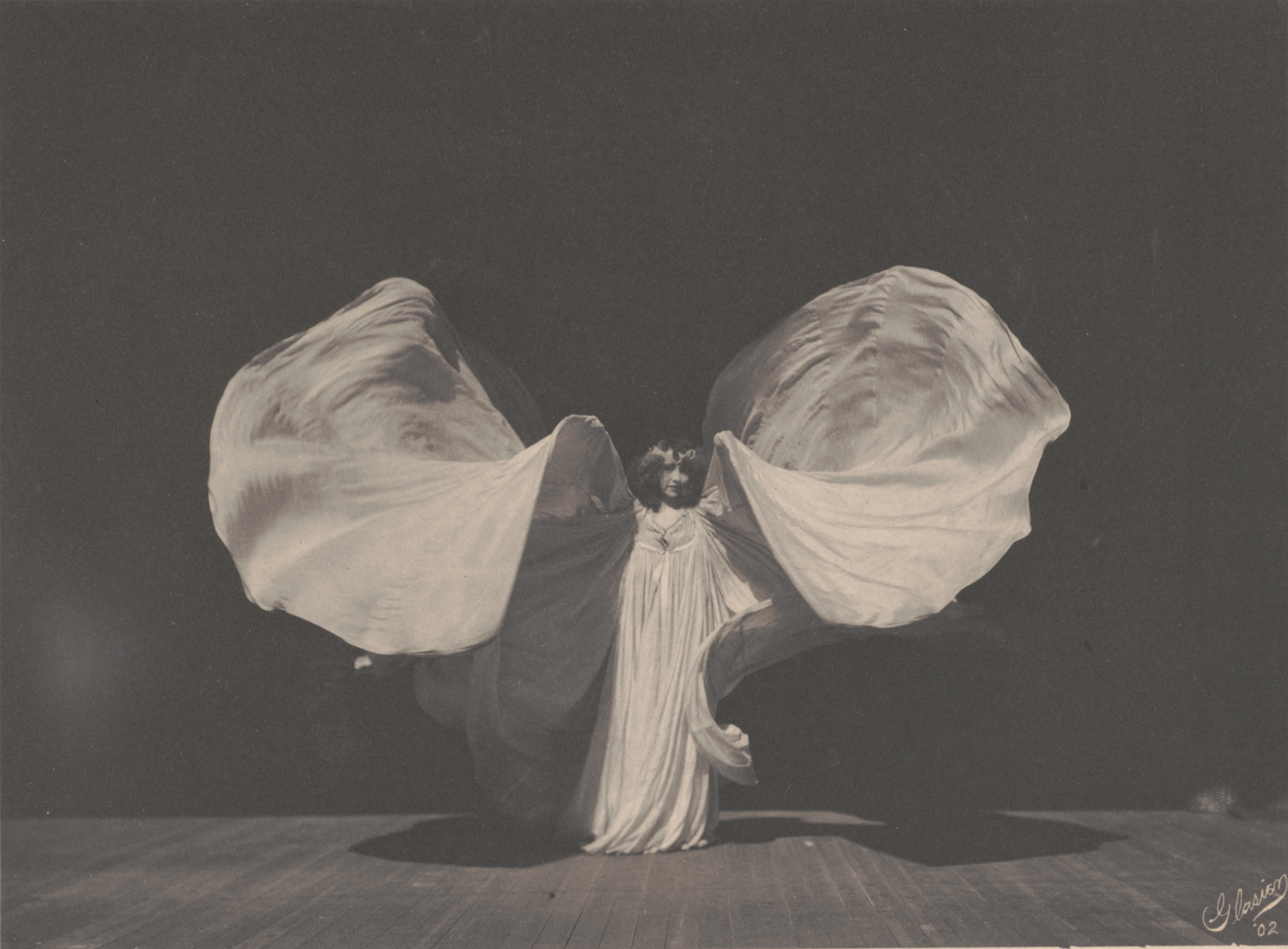
Portrait of Loie Fuller performing a serpentine dance, by Frederick Glasier, 1902

The illusion of Kate Moss is regarded by many critics as the highlight of the Widows runway show. Writing for Vogue, Sarah Mower said that "only Alexander McQueen could provide the astonishing feat of techno-magic that ended his show." Robert McCaffrey, writing in The Fashion Studies Journal, called it "one of McQueen's most enduring and iconic finales". American fashion editor Robin Givhan wrote that "McQueen created a fantasy that made his audience believe in the wizardry of fashion and its ability to move the spirit." Jess Cartner-Morley of The Guardian called it a "suitably haunting finale". Lisa Armstrong at The Times was more critical, calling it "unspeakably cheesy". Kerry Youmans, a publicist for McQueen, recalled seeing audience members crying upon viewing it. Writing after McQueen's death in 2010, Lorraine Candy, editor-in-chief of Elle, said that "The hologram of Moss ... was all we talked about for months afterwards." In 2014, Jessica Andrews of Vanity Fair named it one of the most dramatic runway stunts in history.

The Victoria and Albert Museum (the V&A) in London owns a variant of the Kate Moss dress created by McQueen's assistant Sarah Burton for the 2006 wedding of another McQueen employee. Moss wore the original again on the cover of the May 2011 issue of Harper's Bazaar UK. In 2015, the Spanish 15-M movement staged a massive protest via hologram projection, taking specific inspiration from the Kate Moss illusion.

The Kate Moss illusion appeared in Alexander McQueen: Savage Beauty, a retrospective exhibition of McQueen's designs shown at the Metropolitan Museum of Art in 2011 (the Met) and the V&A in 2015. In the original presentation at the Met, the Moss illusion was recreated in miniature, but in the V&A re-staging, it was presented in full size in its own room. (Note: In a review of the exhibition, media theorist Johannes Birringer refers to the hologram as "scaled down, in a small dark room", but other sources state that it was full-size compared to the miniature version presented at the Metropolitan Museum.) According to Sam Gainsbury, who worked on production for the illusion, McQueen had "always wanted to show [the illusion] independently as a work of art", so the team ensured that it was staged that way for the V&A's version of the exhibit.

== Analysis ==
=== Gothic tropes ===
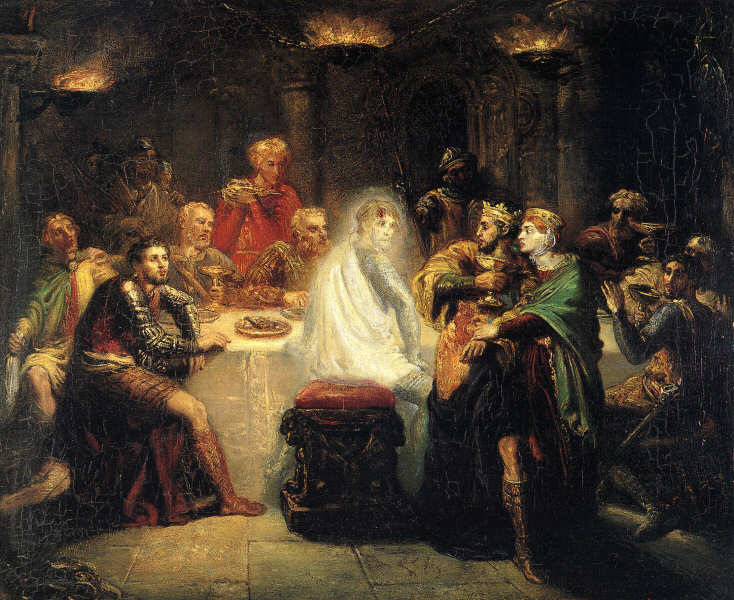
Banquo's Ghost (1855), Théodore Chassériau (1819–1856)

Critics have described The Widows of Culloden as an exploration of Gothic literary tropes – particularly melancholy and haunting – via fashion, and the illusion of Kate Moss plays a significant role in this analysis. According to McQueen, the collection took inspiration from Shakespeare's play Macbeth. Cartner-Morley argued that Moss effectively played the role of Banquo, a character who haunts Macbeth as a ghost throughout the play. Literature professor Catherine Spooner connected the illusion to the visual effects used to portray spirits in the séances of the 19th century, and literary scholar Bill Sherman compared the effect on the audience to the "reverie" inspired by ghost stories of the era. Researcher Kate Bethune wrote that the collection's sense of melancholy was "consolidated in its memorable finale".

McCaffrey presented a similar analysis, writing that the illusion of Kate Moss was an example of highly staged Gothic melancholy, playing on the "tensions between beauty and heartache". He contrasted the illusion with the "spine" corset featured in Untitled (Spring/Summer 1998), viewing both as memento mori – artistic reminders of the inevitability of death. He saw the corset as an example of overt material horror, whereas the illusion functioned as an aesthetic horror that depended on the audience's emotional involvement for effect.

McCaffrey called Moss's appearance in the show a kind of resurrection following the damage done to her career by the drug allegations, which may have been a deliberate allusion: after McQueen's death, Moss recalled that when he suggested the concept to her, he said he wanted her to be "rising like a phoenix from a fire". Film theorist Su-Anne Yeo argued that the illusion was successful in helping to rehabilitate Moss's image. She wrote that the presentation of the illusion at the V&A particularly "helped to transform Moss from an object of tabloid fodder to one of legitimate critical concern". In a 2014 interview with British photographer Nick Knight, Moss confirmed that she had decided not to attend the show in person, even in disguise; she assumed it would be found out eventually and would "take away from all the magic ... the whole thing of me being a ghost".

Sarah Heaton, whose work focuses on the intersection between fashion and literature, described the illusion as evoking the Gothic trope of the barefoot "mad woman"; normally this figure would be confined to an attic or asylum, but McQueen subverts the expectation by displaying her to the public, making her ephemeral and uncontained. Fashion theorists Paul Jobling, Philippa Nesbitt, and Angelene Wong concur, arguing that the presentation demonstrated that Moss's body, as a symbol of female power, was "numinous, untouchable, and evading capture".

Moss's chiffon gown has been critiqued as an unconventional wedding dress. Cultural theorist Monika Seidl was critical of the illusion, arguing that it presented Moss as a contained female "Wiedergänger" or vengeful spirit. She did however find the dress persuasive in the way it "destabilise[s] the notion of a bride". Literary theorist Monica Germanà also took the dress to be a wedding gown, and found it an example of "the morbid coalescence of love and death", a recurring theme for McQueen.

=== Technical analysis ===
Other authors have analysed the illusion of Kate Moss as a form of technologically altered reality, sometimes with supernatural associations. Anthropologist Brian Moeran used the illusion as an example of the runway show as a modern magical ritual, writing that the show's "magic is intimately entwined with technological sophistication". Author Genevieve Valentine described it as a science fiction element. Fashion historian Ingrid Loschek wrote that "the catwalk was transformed into a form of virtual reality" through the projection, which energised the audience. Fashion writer Nathalie Khan contrasted the illusion with a straightforward film projection, saying that unlike a film, the illusion made Moss "no longer a mortal subject, but perception made invisible". Jenna Ng described the projection of Moss, a living person, as a kind of rearrangement of physical distance: "the holographic subject appears to be virtually here amongst the present audience even as they are actually elsewhere at the time". She called it an example of the "post-screen", in which there is no barrier between the audience's space and the image. Timothy Campbell cited the illusion of Kate Moss as a literalisation, through technology, of the "fundamental spectrality of fashion". He felt that its placement at the end of the show, followed by McQueen's appearance to take his bow, was a way of making an "authorial claim to ownership" over the imagery produced in his shows.

Yeo was critical of the V&A's emphasis on the technological aspect of the illusion, arguing that it incorrectly positioned the effect as modern rather than historical. She argued that it would have been more appropriate to emphasise the connection to older forms of performance like the serpentine dance and phantasmagoria, a theatrical form that uses magic lanterns to project images. Performance theorist Johannes Birringer was critical of the entire Savage Beauty exhibit, but particularly so of the apparent reverence given to the illusion by the audience: "There was a hushed silence in that holographic room which I found pathetic."

== Bibliography ==
=== Books ===
- Albright, Ann Cooper (2007). Traces of Light: Absence and Presence in the Work of Loïe Fuller. Middletown, Connecticut: Wesleyan University Press. ISBN 978-0-8195-6843-4. Archived from the original on 14 January 2023.
- Beech, Martin (2011). The Physics of Invisibility: A Story of Light and Deception. New York City: Springer Science+Business Media. ISBN 978-1-4614-0616-7.
- Campbell, Timothy (2020). ""Style Description:/Provenance:/Period:": Martin Margiela, Fashion Authorship, and Romantic Literary History". In Egan, Gerald (ed.). Fashion and Authorship: Literary Production and Cultural Style from the Eighteenth to the Twenty-First Century. Camden: Palgrave Macmillan. pp. 321–340. ISBN 978-3-030-26898-5.
- Fox, Chloe (2012). Vogue on: Alexander McQueen. Vogue on Designers. London: Quadrille Publishing. ISBN 978-1-84949-113-6. OCLC 828766756. Archived from the original on 5 January 2023.
- Germanà, Monica (2020). Bond Girls: Body, Fashion and Gender. London: Bloomsbury Visual Arts. ISBN 978-0-85785-643-2. OCLC 1115002952.
- Gleason, Katherine (2012). Alexander McQueen: Evolution. New York City: Race Point Publishing. ISBN 978-1-61058-837-9. Archived from the original on 5 January 2023.
- Heaton, Sarah (2017). "Wayward Wedding Dresses". In Whitehead, Julia; Petrov, Gudrun D. (eds.). Fashioning Horror. London: Bloomsbury Visual Arts. pp. 83–100. doi:10.5040/9781350036215.ch-004. ISBN 978-1-350-03621-5.
- Jobling, Paul; Nesbitt, Philippa; Wong, Angelene (2022). Fashion, Identity, Image. London: Bloomsbury Visual Arts. ISBN 978-1-350-18323-0. Archived from the original on 12 January 2023.
- Khan, Nathalie (2013). "Fashion as Mythology: Considering the Legacy of Alexander McQueen". In Bruzzi, Stella; Gibson, Pamela Church (eds.). Fashion Cultures Revisited. London: Routledge. pp. 261–271. ISBN 978-0-415-68005-9.
- Knox, Kristin (2010). Alexander McQueen: Genius of a Generation. London: A&C Black. ISBN 978-1-4081-3223-4. Archived from the original on 5 January 2023.
- Loschek, Ingrid (2009). When Clothes Become Fashion: Design and Innovation Systems. Oxford: Berg Publishers. ISBN 978-0-85785-144-4. Archived from the original on 5 January 2023.
- Moeran, Brian (2016). The Magic of Fashion: Ritual, Commodity, Glamour. London: Routledge. ISBN 978-1-315-41796-7. Archived from the original on 14 January 2023.
- Ng, Jenna (2021). "Holograms/Holographic Projections: Ghosts Amongst the Living; Ghosts of the Living". The Post-Screen Through Virtual Reality, Holograms and Light Projections: Where Screen Boundaries Lie. Amsterdam: Amsterdam University Press. pp. 155–188. doi:10.2307/j.ctv23985t6.8. ISBN 978-90-4855-256-6. JSTOR j.ctv23985t6.8. S2CID 244720894.
- Seidl, Monika (2009). "British Fashion and Romanticism Today: Where the Present Dreams the Past Future". In Eckstein, Lars (ed.). Romanticism Today: Selected Papers from the Tübingen Conference of the German Society for English Romanticism. Trier: WVT Wissenschaftlicher Verlag Trier. pp. 215–226. ISBN 978-3-86821-147-4. OCLC 427321505. Archived from the original on 14 January 2023.
- Valentine, Genevieve (2019). "Savage Beauty: Alexander McQueen". In Boskovich, Desirina (ed.). Lost Transmissions: The Secret History of Science Fiction and Fantasy. New York City: Abrams Image. pp. 218–219. ISBN 978-1-68335-498-7. Archived from the original on 14 January 2023.
- Watt, Judith (2012). Alexander McQueen: The Life and the Legacy. New York City: Harper Design. ISBN 978-1-84796-085-6. OCLC 892706946.
- Wilcox, Claire, ed. (2015). Alexander McQueen. New York City: Abrams Books. ISBN 978-1-4197-1723-9. OCLC 891618596.
  - Sherman, Bill. "Ghosts". In Wilcox (2015), pp. 243–246.
  - Spooner, Catherine. "A Gothic Mind". In Wilcox (2015), pp. 141–158.
- Wilson, Andrew (2015). Alexander McQueen: Blood Beneath the Skin. New York City: Simon and Schuster. ISBN 978-1-4767-7674-3.
- Yeo, Su-Anne (2020). "Summoning the Ghosts of Early Cinema and Victorian Entertainment: Kate Moss and Savage Beauty at the Victoria and Albert Museum". In Menotti, Gabriel; Crisp, Virginia (eds.). Practices of Projection: Histories and Technologies. Oxford: Oxford University Press. ISBN 978-0-19-093411-8. Archived from the original on 14 January 2023.
- Young, Caroline; Martin, Ann (2017). Tartan + Tweed. London: Frances Lincoln Limited. ISBN 978-0-7112-3822-0. OCLC 947020251.

=== Journals ===
- Birringer, Johannes (2016). "Performance In the Cabinet of Curiosities: Or, The Boy Who Lived in the Tree". PAJ: A Journal of Performance and Art. 38 (3): 27–28. doi:10.1162/PAJJ_a_00331. ISSN 1520-281X. JSTOR 26386804. S2CID 57559845.
- McCaffrey, Robert (24 September 2020). "Alexander McQueen: The Sublime and Melancholy". The Fashion Studies Journal. Archived from the original on 21 September 2022.
- Sheean, Jacqueline (2 October 2018). "A (New) Specter Haunts Europe: the Political Legibility of Spain's Hologram Protests". Journal of Spanish Cultural Studies. 19 (4): 469. doi:10.1080/14636204.2018.1524995. ISSN 1463-6204. S2CID 149971456.
- Tegan, Mary Beth (1 October 2021). ""The Contagion of Her Wretchedness": Rousing Interest in the Highland Widows of Scott and McQueen". Essays in Romanticism. 28 (2): 95. doi:10.3828/eir.2021.28.2.4. ISSN 2049-6702. S2CID 239506478. Archived from the original on 7 October 2022.
