= McQueeney =

McQueeney is a surname. Notable people with the surname include:

- John McQueeney, American politician
- Robert McQueeney (1919–2002), American actor
- Patricia McQueeney (1927–2005), American actress

== See also ==
- McQueeney, Texas, census-designated place (CDP) in Guadalupe County, Texas, USA
- Lake McQueeney, reservoir on the Guadalupe River in the USA
