= McQueen =

McQueen, Mcqueen, MacQueen or Macqueen may refer to:

== People ==
- Clan Macqueen, a Scottish clan
- McQueen (surname), including a list of people named McQueen, Mcqueen, MacQueen or Macqueen
- McQueen McIntosh (1822–1868), United States and Confederate judge

== Entertainment ==
- McQueen (band), all-female rock band from Brighton, England
- McQueen (film), a 2018 British documentary film about designer Alexander McQueen
- McQueen (TV series), Canadian series in 1969–70
- McQueen (play), a 2015 play by James Phillips and directed by John Caird
- Lightning McQueen, the main character of the Cars franchise

== Places ==
- McQueen, Edmonton, a neighbourhood of the city of Edmonton, Alberta, Canada
- McQueen, Oklahoma, an unincorporated settlement
