= Patricia McQueeney =

American talent agent (1927–2005)

Patricia Noonan McQueeney
- Born: September 16, 1927; Bridgeport, Connecticut, USA
- Died: September 4, 2005 (aged 77); Santa Monica, California, USA
- Occupation: Talent agent
- Spouse: Robert McQueeney (annulment)
- Children: Three children

Patricia Noonan McQueeney (September 16, 1927 in Bridgeport, Connecticut – September 4, 2005 in Santa Monica, California) was an American actress, television personality, and talent agent perhaps best known as Harrison Ford's manager.

== Career ==
After early work as a model and actress in television commercials under the name "Patricia Scott", McQueeney was hired for The Today Show by first host Dave Garroway and appeared frequently on the show until 1964.

In 1970, McQueeney met Harrison Ford and began to work for him, first as his agent and later also as his personal manager. In 1973, she launched her own agency, which represented many rising Hollywood stars, including Teri Garr, Mackenzie Phillips, Cindy Williams, and Candy Clark. She continued to represent Ford until her death in 2005. She served on a California state commission tasked with recommending changes in the laws governing talent representation. She has been memorialized by the Talent Manager's Association with a service award in her name.

== Personal life ==
At the age of seventeen, she married fellow Bridgeport native and actor Robert McQueeney, and they had three children together. Their marriage was annulled in the mid-1950s, and Robert later became a Roman Catholic priest; he died in 2002. Patricia never remarried.
