= McSwain =

McSwain may refer to:

- Bill McSwain (born 1969), American lawyer
- Charlie McSwain (1901–1976), Australian football player
- Chuck McSwain (born 1961), American football player
- Ginny McSwain, American voice actor and voice director
- John J. McSwain (1875–1936), U.S. Representative
- John Stephen McSwain (1915–1991), better known by his stage name Dude Martin, American country singer, bandleader, radio and television host
- Rod McSwain (born 1962), American football player
- McSwain, California, United States, a census-designated place
