= John Macsween (entrepreneur) =

John Angus Macsween (17 October 1939 – 12 July 2006) was a Scottish butcher and entrepreneur who helped popularise haggis as an international dish.

== Business ==
Macsween came from a family of butchers in Edinburgh, where he noted the popularity of haggis among English rugby fans attending international matches at Murrayfield Stadium. After taking over the family business in 1975, the subsequent popularity of their haggis led to his opening the world's first purpose-built haggis factory, and the sale of the butchers company. In the 1970s Macsween took samples to London, and soon received orders for Macsween haggis from major buyers including Selfridges, Harrods, and Fortnum & Mason.

Macsween started to produce what was described as a vegetarian haggis in 1984, after a request from the Burns Supper at the Scottish Poetry Library. It is stated that this was the first vegetarian haggis produced and available commercially.

== Personal life ==
Macsween was the eldest of three siblings and attended James Gillespie's High School and George Heriot's School.

Macsween married Kate Mackay, the daughter of James Wilson McKay, who became Lord Provost of Edinburgh, in 1964. His wife and his four children survived him at this death, and Macsween haggis continued to be produced, sold under both the Macsween name and as supermarkets' own brands.

He also had an interest in horticulture.
