= Aodh Mac Suibhne =

Aodh Mac Suibhne, a.k.a. Hugh McSweeney, Gallowglass of Clanricarde, died 1586.

Mac Suibhne was a Gallowglass who fought for the Earl of Clanricarde in south Connacht. The family resided at Rath Glas, and were descendants of Domnall na Madhmann Mac Suibhne (fl. 1419). According to the 1585 Composition of Connacht, the only castles held in Clanricarde by members of the Mac Suibhne were at Kiltullagh and Cloughereavane, some six miles north of Loughrea.

The Annals of the Four Masters give his obituary under the year 1586:

Hugh, the son of Owen, son of Donnell, son of Owen, son of Donnell-naMadhmann Mac Sweeny, Chief Constable of Clanrickard, died; and the person who then departed was a soldier in stature, and a hero in valour.

== See also ==
- Clan Sweeney
