= Clan Macqueen =

Highland Scottish clan

Clan MacQueen / Clan Revan
- MacShuibhne
- Crest: An heraldic wolf rampant Ermine holding an arrow, point downwards Argent pheoned Gules
- Motto: Constant and faithful

Profile
- Region: Highland
- Plant badge: boxwood or red whortleberry
- Clan MacQueen / Clan Revan no longer has a chief, and is an armigerous clan
- Last Chief: The MacQueen of Corrybrough
Allied clans
Chattan Confederation
Clan MacDonald of Clan Ranald

Clan Macqueen is a Highland Scottish clan and a member of the Chattan Confederation. The clan does not currently have a chief and is therefore considered an armigerous clan.

== History ==
=== Origins ===
The name MacQueen is sometimes also given as MacSween which means son of Sweyn. The MacQueens are allegedly of the same descent as the Clan Donald, having kinship with the High Kings of Ireland. The MacQueens are said to have provided a guard for a daughter of the chief of Clan MacDonald of Clanranald, who married a chief of the Clan Mackintosh. The Mackintosh clan were also chiefs of the Chattan Confederation and so the MacQueens settled around upperFindhorn valley and became part of the confederation of Clan Chattan.

The Clan MacQueen was then known as the Clan Revan. The chiefs became the Lairds of Corrieborough and were highly regarded amongst the supporters of the MacDonalds.

=== 18th century ===
The chief of the Clan MacDonald of Sleat said in 1778: "it does me great honour to have the sons of the Chieftains in the Regiment and as the MacQueens have been invariably attached to our family, to whom we believe we owe our existence, I am proud of the nomination".

The MacQueens or MacSweens were numerous in the Hebrides. The Reverend of Snizort, Donald MacQueen was of such intellect that he even impressed the doctor Samuel Johnson when he visited the Hebrides. The name MacQueen was not always highly regarded as Robert McQueen, Lord Braxfield, a notorious 18th-century judge was feared for his savage sentences and use of the death penalty.

The chief's family is believed to have moved to New Zealand and the clan became scattered throughout Scotland and the rest of the English-speaking world.

== Modern clan symbolism ==
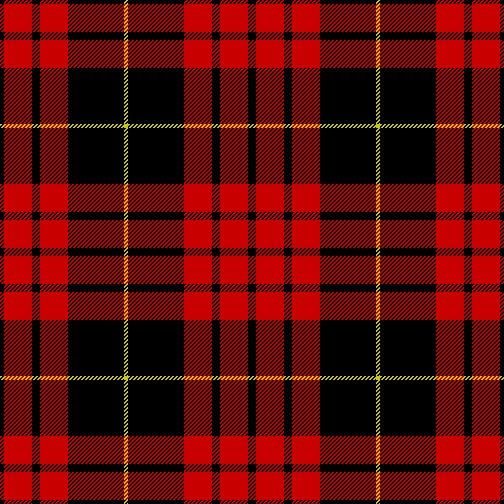
The MacQueen tartan, as published in the Vestiarium Scoticum in 1842. Today the Vestiarium is considered a Victorian era hoax.

Today members of Scottish clans show their clan allegiance by wearing Scottish crest badges, clan tartans and sometimes clan badges (plant badges). The crest badge suitable for members of Clan MacQueen contains the heraldic crest of an heraldic tyger rampant Ermine holding an arrow, point downwards Argent pheoned Gules. The heraldic motto that appears upon the crest badge is CONSTANT AND FAITHFUL. Another badge sometimes used by clan members is a clan badge (or plant badge). Several different clan badges have been attributed to various MacQueens. The MacQueens associated with Clan Chattan are attributed boxwood and red whortleberry as a clan badge. Many other Scottish clans which are closely associated with Clan Chattan have been attributed the same plants. The MacQueen's of Skye, on the other hand, have common heath attributed as their clan badge. Common heath is the clan badge of many of the clans associated with Clan Donald.

The MacQueen tartan was first published in 1842, in the Vestiarium Scoticum. The Vestiarium was the work of the dubious "Sobieski Stuarts" and is today considered a Victorian era hoax. The tartan is supposedly that of Clan Revan, being named after Revan MacMulmor MacAngus MacQueen who led a MacDonald bride to be married to a chief of Clan Mackintosh. The Scottish Tartans World Register (STWR) notes that the MacQueen tartan is similar to the Fraser and Gunn tartans, which both have four bold stripes. However, the STWR considers it to be a combination of the MacDonald and Mackintosh tartans. The tartan scholar D. C. Stewart noted that the MacQueen tartan is the reverse of the MacKeane tartan, possibly because of the two similar-sounding names, even though both names have a different history.

== Associated Names and Septs ==
The following Scottish and Irish names are spelling variants of the Clan name MacQueen:

- M'Quain
- McQuain
- McSwain
- MacQuien
- MacCuinn
- MacCunn
- MacShuain
- MacSuain
- MacSwan
- MacSween
- McSweeney
- MacSwen
- MacSwyde
- Mhic Cuithain
- Mhic Cuithein
- Mhic Suibne
- McQueen
- Queen
- Swain
- Swan
- Swann
- Sween
- Sweeney
- Swyne

== See also ==
- Clan Chattan
- Clan Sweeney
- MacQueen of Findhorn
- McQueen (disambiguation), things named McQueen, MacQueen.
- McQueen (surname), the surnames McQueen, MacQueen.
