= Wheen =

Wheen is a surname. Notable people with the surname include:

- Arthur Wesley Wheen (1897–1971), Australian soldier, translator, and museum librarian
- Francis Wheen (born 1957), British journalist, writer, and broadcaster
- John Gladwell Wheen (died 1929), Methodist minister
- Natalie Wheen (born 1947), English writer and radio presenter
