= Robert McQueeney =

American actor

- Born: March 5, 1919; Bridgeport, Connecticut, U.S.
- Died: April 24, 2002 (aged 83)
- Occupations: Actor; Roman Catholic priest
- Spouse: Patricia McQueeney (annulment)
- Children: 3

Robert McQueeney (March 5, 1919 – April 24, 2002) was an American actor, best known for television roles during the 1950s and 1960s. During and after his acting career, he also worked as a golf pro and instructor.

== Acting career ==
A versatile character actor, McQueeney appeared on Broadway in Billy Budd (1951) and Fragile Fox (1954). In 1959, he portrayed the 19th century actor, Edwin Booth, brother of John Wilkes Booth, the assassin of U.S. President Abraham Lincoln, in the episode "The Man Who Loved Lincoln" on the ABC/Warner Brothers western television series, Colt .45, starring Wayde Preston as the fictitious undercover agent Christopher Colt, who in the story line is assigned to protect Booth following a death threat. That year he also played the role of murderer Michael Dwight in the Perry Mason episode, "The Case of the Lost Last Act".

He appeared in guest roles on such television series as Bonanza, Gunsmoke and Decoy, as well as Warner Bros. Television's Lawman, 77 Sunset Strip, Bronco and the short-lived The Alaskans.

His one shot at a leading role in a series was his portrayal of newspaper reporter Conley Wright on Warner Bros./ABC's short-lived World War II series, The Gallant Men (1962–63). He played supporting roles in such films as Portrait of a Mobster (1961) and The Glory Guys (1965).

== Personal life ==
He had three children with his former wife, Patricia McQueeney. She was a model and an actress in television commercials who appeared regularly in the 1950s on NBC's The Today Show. She operated a talent agency, McQueeney Management, that for years handled the career of Harrison Ford.

After the annulment of his marriage, he was ordained as a Roman Catholic priest. For twenty years until his death, he was the spiritual director for the Padre Pio Foundation of America in Cromwell, Connecticut.

Somewhat coincidentally, considering his one leading role in a television series as a reporter, McQueeney wrote many articles for the Padre Pio Foundation after his ordination. Much of his work is still available on the Internet.
