= Jim McQueen =

American freelance sports illustrator

Jim McQueen is an American freelance sports illustrator. A photo-realist, McQueen has illustrated over 50 books and written syndicated columns for the likes of Jack Nicklaus, Billy Casper, Dave Hill and Stan Smith. In addition, Jim served as the senior illustrator for Golf Digest for 30 years, Golf Magazine for 10 years, Tennis Magazine for 13 years and The Majors of Golf magazine for 8 years.

He is the illustrator for Jack Nicklaus's My Golden Lessons and Golf My Way.
