= Macsween (butcher) =

Scottish food company

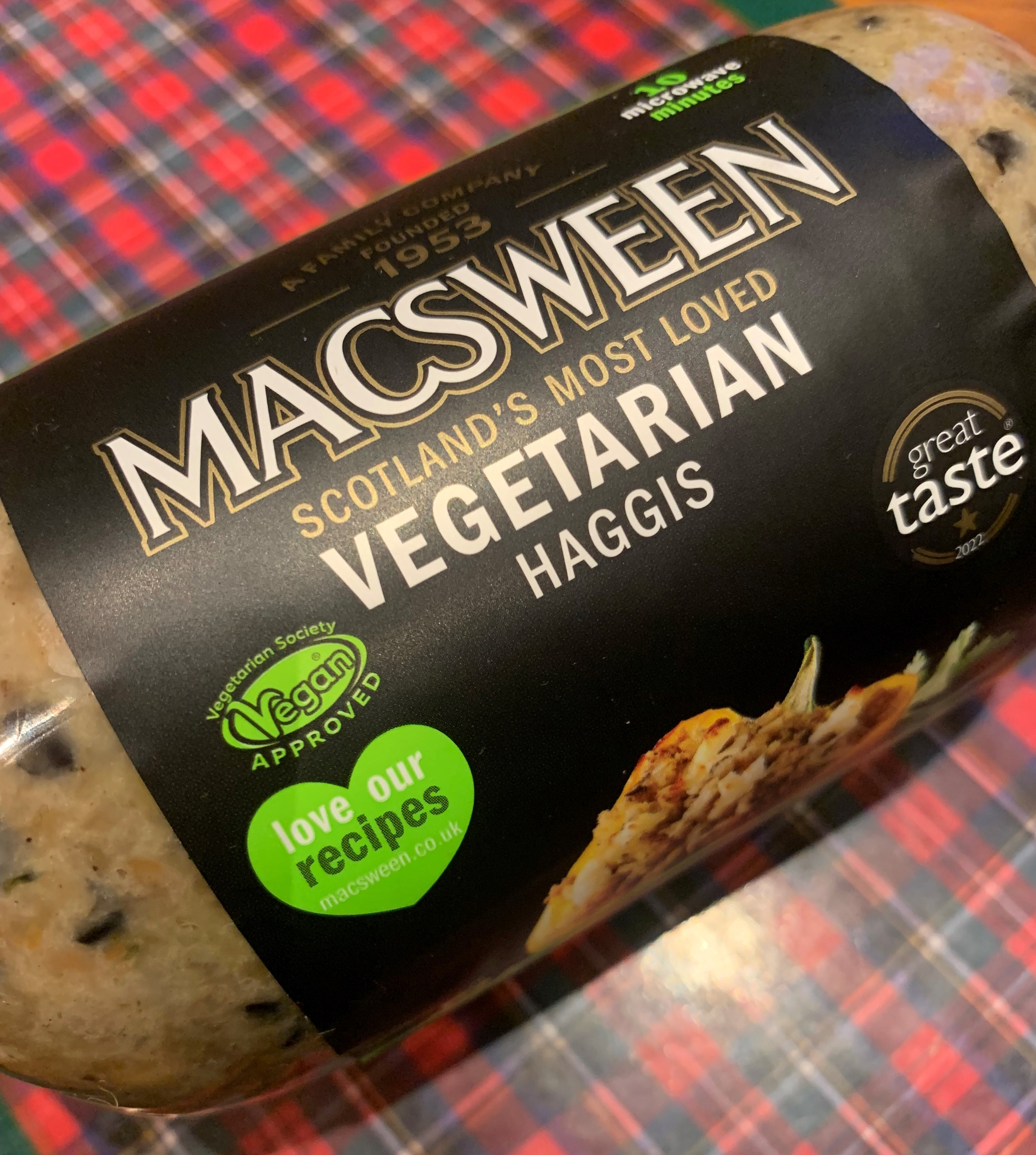
MacSween's vegetarian haggis brand.

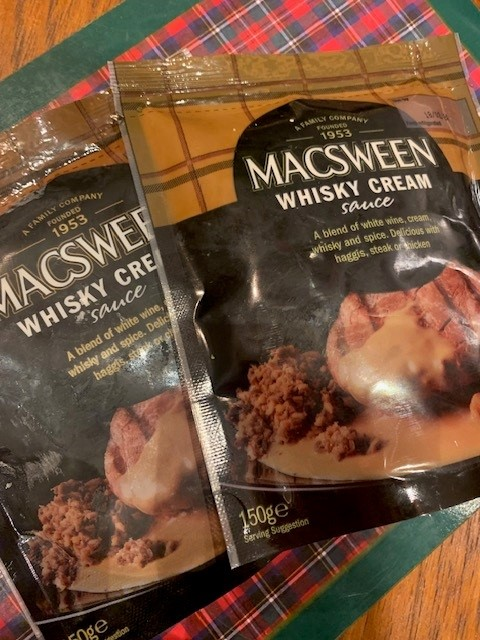
Whisky Cream Sauce

Macsween of Edinburgh is a Scottish company, known for making haggis. Macsween is a family company established as a butchers shop in Bruntsfield in Edinburgh, opened by Charlie and Jean Macsween in the 1950s. Their eldest son John Macsween took over and expanded the business with his wife Kate after Charlie died in 1975. In 1989, it was producing 1,000 pounds (450 kg) of haggis a day. In 1990, John and Kate's children, Jo and James, joined the business and their factory was opened in Loanhead.

== International impact ==
In 2017, Macsween became the first Scottish haggis manufacturer to export to Canada after developing a new recipe that met Canadian regulations, using lamb heart instead of lung. Canada is Macsween's biggest foreign export market. Macsweens is also popular in Singapore, the Middle East and Asia, United Arab Emirates and Taiwan. Haggis imports to the USA have been banned since 1971.

James Macsween, highlights that "Macsween now exports haggis to 7 international markets, and we expect to see that demand continue to grow as more people around the world come to love our traditional Scottish delicacy.

Exports to Europe were at risk following Brexit, but the company made plans to survive.

Haggis is a popular Scottish food associated with Burns Night celebrations around the World.

== Vegetarian Haggis ==
Macsween are well known for developing a vegetarian version of the traditional meat and offal based haggis. The first vegetarian haggis was developed by John in the 1980s for the opening of the Scottish Poetry Library. It was approved by the Vegetarian Society in 1984. Macsween's vegetarian haggis is made using vegetables, pulses, oatmeal, seeds and spices.

== Haggis Variations ==
Haggis variations produced by Macsween include wild boar, venison, gluten-free and Three Birds.

Jo Macsween has published recipe books to encourage and support people to use haggis as an ingredient in a range of ways.
