= Donald MacQueen =

Donald MacQueen (c.1712 – 1 February 1785) was a Church of Scotland minister in the Isle of Skye and a notable scholar, who made a favourable impression on Dr Johnson and James Boswell on their tour of the Hebrides in 1773.

== Family ==
MacQueen was born in Trotternish, in the Isle of Skye, the son of the Reverend Archibald MacQueen and Isabella (née Mackenzie). He married, first, Betsy Martin and, secondly, Anne Macdonald and had a number of notable descendants, including his grandson, Thomas Potter MacQueen, MP for East Looe (1816-1826) and Bedfordshire (1826-1830).

== Life and work ==
MacQueen was ordained in 1740 and was appointed minister of Kilmuir and of Kilmaluag. He was the author of a number of works including Reflections on Clanship (1763) and a Dissertation of the Government of the People of the Western Isles (1774). He was also employed by the General Assembly of the Church of Scotland to revise (with other selected ministers) the translation of the Pentateuch into Gaelic.

On 13 February 1781 he was admitted as a corresponding member of the Society of Antiquaries of Scotland, which published some of his writings.

MacQueen featured prominently in the accounts written by Dr Johnson and James Boswell of their tour of the Hebrides after he met them and accompanied them to Raasay. Boswell described him as "a decent minister, an elderly man with his own black hair, courteous and rather slow of speech, but candid, sensible and well-informed, nay, learned." Johnson was also impressed, saying to Boswell, "This is a critical man, sir. There must be great vigour of mind to make him cultivate learning so much in the Isle of Skye, where he might do without it. It is wonderful how many of the new publications he has. There must be a snatch of every opportunity."

MacQueen died in Raasay in 1785 and is buried in Kilmuir churchyard.
