= McSweeney =

McSweeney is a surname. Notable people with the surname include:

- Ailis McSweeney (born 1983), Irish sprinter specialising in the 100 metre event
- Alex McSweeney, British actor who appeared on the TV show EastEnders (2003–2004)
- Alf McSweeney, printer who founded the magazine Race Walking Record in 1941, and edited the magazine for 16 years
- Barry McSweeney, Irish scientist and the first Chief Science Advisor to the Government of Ireland
- Dave McSweeney (born 1981), English footballer, senior career began in 2000
- David McSweeney (politician) (born 1965), Investment banker who was the Republican candidate in Illinois's 8th congressional district election, 2006
- Ella McSweeney (born 1978), Irish radio and television presenter and producer
- Ervin McSweeney (born 1957), New Zealand cricketer who played 16 One Day Internationals in the 1980s
- James McSweeney (born 1980), English mixed martial arts fighter and former Muay Thai kickboxer
- John M. McSweeney, the first American ambassador to Bulgaria
- John McSweeney, known as John Zewizz (born 1955), English-born American industrial music performer
- John McSweeney (Ohio politician) (1890–1969), United States congressman representing Ohio
- Joyelle McSweeney (born 1976), poet, critic, and professor at the University of Notre Dame
- Leah McSweeney (born 1982), founder and CEO of the "Married to the MOB" clothing line
- Leon McSweeney (born 1983), Irish footballer, senior career began in 2000
- Miles Benjamin McSweeney (1855–1909), 87th Governor of South Carolina (1899–1903)
- Morgan McSweeney (born 1977), Irish-born British political strategist, Downing Street Chief of Staff (2024–2026)
- Neil McSweeney (born 1976) Songwriter and musician based in Sheffield, England
- Peter McSweeney (1842–1921), merchant and politician who represented the Northumberland division in Canadian Senate (1899–1921)
- Robyn McSweeney (born 1957), Australian politician, member of the Legislative Council in the state of Western Australia
- Siobhán McSweeney (born 1977), Irish actress
- Trash McSweeney, Australian musician and lead singer for the band The Red Paintings

== See also ==
- McSween (surname)
- McSweeney's, an American publishing house
- Timothy McSweeney's Quarterly Concern, a literary journal published by the McSweeney's publishing house
- Naoíse Mac Sweeney, British archaeologist, historian, writer, and academic.
- Sweeney (name), surname list
