= Johannes Birringer =

German choreographer

Johannes Birringer is a German independent media choreographer and artistic director of AlienNation Co., a multimedia ensemble that has collaborated on various site-specific and cross-cultural performance and installation projects since 1993. He lives and works in Houston and London.

== Biography ==
Johannes Birringer's artistic training was in theatre and dance; he studied dance-theatre forms that emerged in Germany in the 1970s (Pina Bausch) as well as contemporary dance and movement in the U.S. (with Deborah Hay). After several years of performing, composing his own work in collaboration with dancers, actors, musicians and visual artists, he began to design and direct choreography that included film/video and live acoustic and electronic sound. Increasingly, his performances involve interactive environments and programming of interfaces for real-time performances and installations.

After his first large-scale exhibition-performances in Houston in the late 1980s (Description of a Landscape, Invisible Cities), he founded an ensemble, AlienNation Co.. which has toured internationally and presented work at festivals, theatres, cultural centers and conferences. He has also created an opera (Orpheus and Eurydike, 1992) and a site-specific installation of Wagner's Parsifal, several documentary films and dance videos, and produced public art projects with artists or cultural workers in Houston, Chicago, Havana, Ljubljana, Eisenhüttenstadt, Dresden, and Göttelborn. In the mid 1990s he began directing workshops on performance technologies in many locations of the world. He has received numerous arts grants, awards, and fellowships for his work and the concepts for his intercultural productions, and in the late 1990s was invited to create the new dance and technology Masters Program at The Ohio State University (1999–2003). While teaching at Ohio State University's Dance Department, he created a new MFA in dance-technology and conducted the "Environments Laboratory." In 2003 he founded the Interaktionslabor Göttelborn, Germany, a summer laboratory located in a former coal mine and focused on research in new media performance and interactive systems. He was a Principal Research Fellow in Live Art at the School of Art and Design, Nottingham Trent University, where he directed a telematic performance lab (LATela) from 2003 to 2006. Since 1998 he has been a Research Fellow with the Anthropology Department at Rice University, Houston.

He has created numerous stage works, video and film installations, and interactive and online collaborative performance work since 1986. He has also published widely on the visual and performing arts, new media and technology.

Since 2006 he has been chair and professor of Performance Technologies at Brunel University, West London, where he created a research group (Design and Performance Lab) dedicated to investigations of wearable technology in cross-over fields of performance, music, design, digital art and fashion. The "DAP-Lab", co-directed by Birringer and Michèle Danjoux, includes artists and researchers, and its production company has produced several new works, Suna no Onna (2007); Ukiyo (2009) - Ukiyo was created in partnership with Japanese artists and began to tour in 2010 - and "for the time being (Victory over the Sun)"(2012-14). A new series of immersive dance installations, 'metakimospheres,' began touring in Europe in 2015-18 as part of a Europe-wide project called METABODY.

Birringer has been contributing editor with PAJ Performing Arts Journal and a contributor to numerous theatre/performance and art journals as well as the newsletter for the Baháʼí Association For the Arts from 1994 (Review: Witnesses of existence - Report on a presentation of art out of Sarajevo in New York City Kunsthalle). Sonja van Kerkhoff created a performance which was reviewed in this newsletter and Birringer contributed an interview responding to the sculpture with some autobiographical responses. He has also been co-editor of the catalogues (Wechselwirkungen, 2004, Spielsysteme, 2006, Manifest der Interaktionskunst, 2014) published by Interaktionslabor, and the editor of Reflexiones sobre Performance, Cultura y Tecnología/ Reflexions on Performance, Culture & Technology.

== Works ==
- [1986]Hamletmachine, dance-theatre production, premiered at UTD Theatre, Dallas.
- [1987] Description of a Landscape, performance-exhibition, premiered at UTD Theatre, Dallas, and exhibited at Lawndale Art Center, Houston in 1988.
- [1988] Translations, theatre production directed at Satellite Theatre, Houston.
- [1989] Invisible Cities, dance theatre performance, premiered at Lawndale Art Center, Houston.
- [1990] Borderland, documentary film, premiered at Rice Media Center, Houston, and exhibited widely, including Greenway 3 Plaza Theatre, Houston; Studio 71, New York; Hallwalls Gallery, Buffalo; Houston International Film Festival; Universidad Nacional, Madrid; Chicago Filmmakers, Chicago; Saarländisches Künstlerhaus, Saarbrücken, Grenzland-Festival, Kultur Zentrum, Eisenhüttenstadt.
- [1990] Ad Mortem, film-dance-music concert, premiered at Lawndale Art Center and Diverse Works, Houston.
- [1992] Orpheus and Eurydike, opera, premiered at Josephine Louis Theatre, Evanston-Chicago.
- [1993] AlienNation, dance-theatre production, premiered at Josephine Louis Theatre, Evanston-Chicago. This signature work was widely performed and traveled to Germany, France, the Netherlands, Slovenia, and well as to the Cleveland Performance Art Festival, Cleveland and Gran Teatro de Habana, Cuba.
- [1993] From the Border, cross-cultural performance festival produced at Northwestern University.
- [1995] Lovers Fragment's, dance-theatre and film performance, premiered at Barber Theatre, Evanston-Chicago and toured to Cleveland and Dresden.
- [1995] Parsifal, collaborative site-specific opera installation, premiered at Festspielhaus Hellerau, Dresden.
- [1995] La lógica que se cumple, film project, Alamar, Cuba, with International Premiere at Habana Film Festival 1996; U.S. premiere: Chicago Latino Film Festival 1997, and further showings at Latin American Theatre Conference, Univ. of California-Irvine, and other conferences.
- [1995] Closed Spaces, collaborative public art project, staged in Eisenhüttenstadt, Germany.
- [1998] Parachute, performance and installation project, International FotoFest Houston.
- [1998 North by South, dance-theatre production, premiered at Diverse Works, Houston.
- [1999] Vespucci, film installation, premiered at Winter Street Art Center; exhibited at ACA Gallery, Austin, Texas; Performance Studies International Conference, Tempe, Arizona; Performance Platform, Dartington College, England; University of Brasília Art Gallery, Brasília; Media Center, Graduate School of Semiotics and Communication-PUC-University, São Paulo.
- [1999] Mirak, sci-fi dance opera, premiered at Diverse Works, Houston, and performed as recital for Houston Composers Forum, Shepherd School of Music.
- [2002] Embers, telepresence dance, premiered at American College Dance Festival, Ann Arbor, Michigan.
- [2002] Here I come again (Flying Birdman), a polysite telepresence performance linking five sites in the USA and two sites in Brazil, collaboratively produced by ADaPT and directed by the Environments Lab.
- [2003] Sueño, multi-media theatre play (written by Angeles Romero), directed and premiered at Mount Hall, Columbus.
- [2004 Ensaio sobre a cegueira, interactive opera installation premiered at Interaktionslabor Göttelborn.
- [2004] Xu, dance film, Beijing, China.
- [2005] Canções dos olhos/Augenlieder, intermedia song cycle premiered at Interaktionslabor Göttelborn.
- [2006] See you in Walhalla, a live game performance collaboratively created with Interaktionslabor and amorphy.org, premiered at IME Industrial Performing Arts Complex, Athens, Greece.
- [2007] Suna no Onna, interactive dance performance created collaboratively with the DAP-Lab, premiered at Laban Centre, London, and reproduced at Watermans Art Center in 2008.
- [2008] Corpo, Carne e Espírito, digital oratorio (with music composed by Paulo Chagas), premiered at FIT-BH Festival, Klauss Vianna Theatre, Belo Horizonte, Brasil.
- [2009-10] Ukiyo (Moveable World), choreographic installation created collaboratively with the DAP Lab and InetDance Japan/Maison/Keio University d'Artaud, Tokyo. First shown at Artaud Performance Center, Brunel University（2009) and Sadler's Wells(2010), UK; additionally new versions of the installation were performed in Maribor, Slovenia, and London.
- [2012] "for the time being (Victory over the Sun)", choreosonic dance work, Watermans, London, International Festival of Digital Art.
- [2014] "for the time being (Victory over the Sun)", dance opera, Lilian Baylis Studio-Sadler's Wells, London.
- [2015] "Metakimosphere no. 2," immersive installation-performance at METATOPE, International Metabody Platform, MediaLab Prado, Madrid, Spain.
- [2016] "Metakimosphere no. 3," immersive kinetic installation, METABODY FORUM, Artaud Performance Center, Brunel, London.
- [2017] "Metakimosphere no.4/Horlà," immersive mixed reality installation, Artaud Performance Center, Brunel, London.
- [2018] "Ephemeral Edgespace (metakimosphre no. 6)," dance performance-installation, with Haein Song and Claudia Robles Angel, ISEA 2018, Durban City Hall, Durban, South Africa.
- [2019] "Mourning for a dead moon," multimedia dance, Artaud Performance Center, Brunel, London.
- [2022] "The river of no one," telematic dance/music performance, The Telepresence Stage/Third Space Network

== Publications ==
Johannes Birringer's books include:

- 1991 Theatre, Theory, Postmodernism (Bloomington: Indiana UP).
- 1998 Media and Performance: along the border (Baltimore: Johns Hopkins UP).
- 2000 Performance on the Edge: Transformations of Culture (London: Continuum).
- 2008 Performance, Technology, and Science (New York: PAJ Publications).
- 2021 Kinetic Atmospheres: Performance and Immersion. Abingdon: Routledge.

He has co-edited the anthology Tanz im Kopf/Dance and Cognition (2005), published by the German Dance Association (GTF), and Die Welt als virtuelles Environment (2007, TMA Hellerau). He edited (with Josephine Fenger) the 2011 GTF volume Tanz und WahnSinn/Choreomania, and also Tanz der Dinge / Things that Dance, Yearbook of the German Dance Association 2019, vol. 29. Bielfeld: transcript Verlag. His extensive output of articles includes:

- 2020 "From Literature to Dance, Choreography, Digital Architectures, and Deep Underground." Podcast, u(bqt)lab
- 2020 A wop bop a loo bop a lop bam boom, Alienist Magazine # 8, 134-141.
- 2019 "Sensory hallucinations in the extended choreographic," Theatre and Performance Design, Bauhaus 100 special issue, 5:1/2, 96-113.
- 2019 "Low End Resilience Theory," PAJ: A Journal of Performance and Art, 123, 28-43.
- 2016 Atmospheres of Dividual Performance Critical Stages 14.
- 2016 Kimospheres, or Shamans in the Blind Country Performance Paradigm 12
- 2016 "Savage Cabinet of Curiosities PAJ: A Journal of Performance and Art, 114, pp. 19–30.
- 2015 / Dance Or We Are Lost: In memoriam Pina Bausch: in Reading Contemporary Performance: Theatricality across Genres, ed. Meiling Cheng/Gabrielle Cody, London: Routledge, 189-93.
- 2015 “Gestural Materialties and the Worn Dispositif,” chapter in Digital Movement: Essays in Motion Technology and Performance, ed. Nicolas Salazar Sutil/Sita Popat, Palgrave Macmillan, pp. 162–85.
- 2013 "“The Sound of Costumes/Audible Choreography”, Artistic Innovation Salon, curated by Caridad Svich for TCG.
- 2013 Bauhaus, Constructivism, Performance, PAJ: A Journal of Performance and Art, 104, 39-52.
- 2013 The Sound of Movement Wearables, with Michèle Danjoux, Leonardo 46:3, 233-40.
- 2012 The Un-seeing Eyes of the Foot (In memoriam Kazuo Ohno), Performance Research 17:2, 132-38.
- 2011 After Dance: Dissolutions and Re-Traces,” corpus. Magazin für Tanz, Choreografie, Performance.
- 2010 Moveable Worlds/Digital Scenographies, International Journal of Performance Arts and Digital Media 6:1, 89-107.
- 2010 Corpo, Carne e Espírito: Musical Visuality of the Body in Blood, Sweat & Theory: Research through Practice in Performance, ed John Freeman. Faringdon: Libri Publishing, pp. 246–61.
- 2009 Wearable Performance, with Michèle Danjoux, Digital Creativity 20:1-2, 95-113.
- 2008 After Choreography, Performance Research 13:1, 118-22.
- 2007 Performance and Technology, in: Dança em foco, ed. Maria Arlete Gonçalves, Rio de Janeiro: Oi Futuro, pp. 34–43.
- 2007 Bodies of Color, Performing Arts Journal 87, 35-46
- 2007 Data Art and Imaginary Landscapes, in: SWAN QUAKE: the user manual, ed. Scott deLahunta, Plymouth: Liquid Press/I-DAT, pp. 37–52.
- 2006 The Emergent Dress: Transformation and Intimacy in Streaming Media and Fashion Performance, with Michèle Danjoux, Performance Research, 11:4, 41-52.
- 2006 Interacting: Performance and Transmediality, in Monologues: Theatre, Performance, Subjectivity, ed. Clare Wallace, Prague: Litteraria Pragensia, pp. 297–325.
- 2006 Performance and Science, Performing Arts Journal 85, 22-35.
- 2006 Interacting, Contemporary Theatre Review 16:4, 389-405.
- 2005 User Testing for Participatory Artworks, International Journal of Performance Arts and Digital Media 1:2,147-73.
- 2005 Dance and Not Dance, Performing Arts Journal 80, 10-27.
- 2004 La Danse et la perception interactives, Nouvelles de Danse 52, 99-115.
- 2004 Der transmediale Tanz, in: Tanz Anders Wo: Tanz intra- und interkulturell, hg. Krassimira Kruschkova, Nele Lipp. Hamburg: LIT Verlag, pp. 23–56.
- 2003 A New Europe, Performing Arts Journal 75, 26-41.
- 2002 Dance and Telepresence, in Arte e Tecnologia na Cultura Contemporânea, ed. Maria Beatriz de Medeiros, Brasília: Universidade de Brasília, pp. 171–79.
- 2002 Experimentelle Tanzmedien, Interaktive Systeme, in Tanz, Theorie, Text. Jahrbuch der Gesellschaft für Tanzforschung, ed. Christa Zipprich/Gabriele Klein, Hamburg: LIT Verlag, pp. 477–98.
- 2001 Muoversi attraverso le tecnologie, in La scena digitale: nuovi media per la danza ed. Armando Menicacci and Emanuele Quinz . Bolzano, Italy: Marsilio, pp. 231–36.
- 1999 Contemporary Performance/Technology, Theatre Journal 61:4, 361-81.
- 1998 Art in America: A Conversation with Tania Bruguera, Performance Research 3:1, 24-31
- 1998 The Movement of Memory: The Physicality of Digital Performance, Leonardo 31:3, 165-72.
- 1997 Postmodernism and Theatrical Performance." In Hans Bertens and Douwe Fokkema, eds., International Postmodernism, vol.XI. Amsterdam: John Benjamins Publishing Co., pp, 129-40.
- 1996 This is the theatre that was to be expected and foreseen, Performance Research 1:1, 32-46
- 1996 La melancolía de la jaula, Performing Arts Journal 52, 103-28
- 1991 Video Art/Performance: A Border Theory, Performing Arts Journal 39, 54-84.
- 1987 Texts, Plays, and Instabilities, South African Theatre Journal 1, 4-17.
- 1986 Pina Bausch: Dancing Across Borders, The Drama Review 30:2, 85-97.
