= Sarabande (collection) =

2007 fashion collection by Alexander McQueen

Tanya Dziahileva wearing the final look from Sarabande on the runway. The fresh flowers attached to the dress began to fall off during her walk, creating a moment of serendipitous beauty.

Sarabande is the twenty-ninth collection by British fashion designer Alexander McQueen, released for the Spring/Summer 2007 season of his eponymous fashion house. Sarabande was an exploration of fragility and decaying grandeur expressed through floral motifs. It was primarily inspired by Barry Lyndon (1975), a film set in the eighteenth century and known for its themes of fatalism and romanticism. Elements of the traditional clothing of Mexico and Spain appeared alongside an exaggerated hourglass silhouette updated from the Edwardian era. The palette was muted, with washed-out dark colours, off whites, and muted pinks and purples, reflecting traditional English mourning colours.

The runway show was staged on 6 October 2006 at the Cirque d'Hiver in Paris. The set was designed to resemble an abandoned wood-floored theatre with a round stage. A chamber orchestra was seated on the stage in two groups facing one another, with a large glass chandelier hung between them. The orchestra played a new version of a sarabande by George Frideric Handel known for appearing in Barry Lyndon; the collection takes its name from the musical style. Forty-six looks were presented. The last dress was covered with silk and fresh flowers, which, having been hastily sewn on, began falling off on the runway, creating what critics regarded as a moment of serendipitous beauty.

Response to Sarabande was positive, with reviewers feeling that it was a successful follow-up to McQueen's previous season. It is recalled as one of his defining collections. Academic analysis has considered the collection's influences and the floral finale dresses. Items from the collection have appeared in exhibitions like the retrospective Alexander McQueen: Savage Beauty.

== Background ==
British fashion designer Alexander McQueen was known for his imaginative, sometimes controversial designs, and dramatic fashion shows. Over the course of his career, which lasted from 1992 until his death in 2010, he explored a broad range of ideas and themes, particularly sexuality, death, violence, romanticism, and historicism. He learned tailoring as an apprentice on Savile Row and dressmaking as head designer at French fashion house Givenchy. (Note: From October 1996 to October 2001, McQueen was simultaneously head designer at Givenchy and at his own label.) Although he worked in ready-to-wear – clothing produced for retail sale – his showpiece designs featured a degree of craftsmanship that verged on haute couture. In 2000, McQueen sold 51 per cent of his company to Italian fashion house Gucci but retained creative control.

McQueen's personal fixations and interests were a throughline in his career, and he returned to certain ideas and visual motifs repeatedly. His collections were historicist, in that he adapted historical designs and narratives, and self-referential, in that he revisited and reworked ideas between collections. He looked to the arts for inspiration, drawing on photographs, paintings, and films. He incorporated his love of the natural world throughout his career with organic materials and visual references. Birds and feathers were an ever-present theme. His favourite flowers, roses, recurred in various forms. They appealed to him in part because of their multi-faceted cultural associations: romance and beauty on the one hand, and pain, blood, and violence on the other. McQueen frequently played with similarly contrasting themes in his work.

He was also known for playing with the silhouette by cutting or structuring garments to produce unusual shapes. In Pantheon ad Lucem (Autumn/Winter 2004), for example, he emphasised the hips, but also showed cinched waists and padded jackets. A number of McQueen's collections included variations on a moulded leather bodice that strictly defined and sculpted the torso, all based on life casts of model Laura Morgan. The first of these was in No. 13 (Spring/Summer 1999), followed by It's Only a Game (Spring/Summer 2005) and In Memory of Elizabeth Howe, Salem, 1692 (Autumn/Winter 2007).

In the years preceding Sarabande, McQueen had reached a stage of exhaustion with his career and the fashion industry, at one point saying, "I go in, I do my business, do the parties, and leave." The collections he presented in 2005, The Man Who Knew Too Much (Autumn/Winter 2005) and Neptune (Spring/Summer 2006), were criticised for being dull and commercial. Although the previous season's collection, The Widows of Culloden (Autumn/Winter 2006), had been seen as a return to form, McQueen remained under pressure to make sales. In 2004, the Gucci group, which owns the McQueen brand, had advised their subsidiary fashion houses that they needed to break even by 2007, so producing a collection that could perform commercially was of utmost importance.

== Concept and creative process ==
=== Inspiration ===
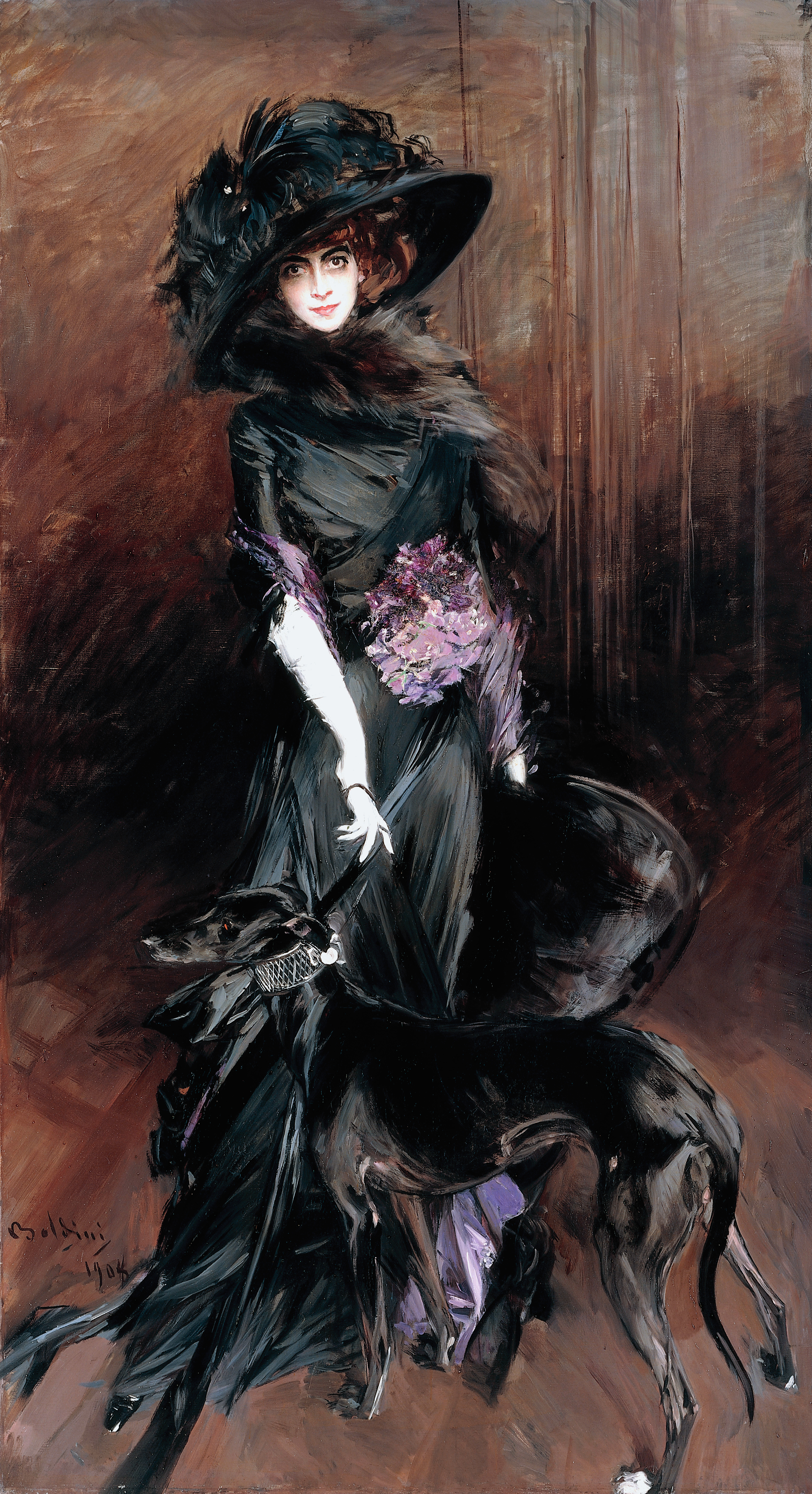
Portrait of Luisa Casati with a greyhound, Giovanni Boldini, 1908

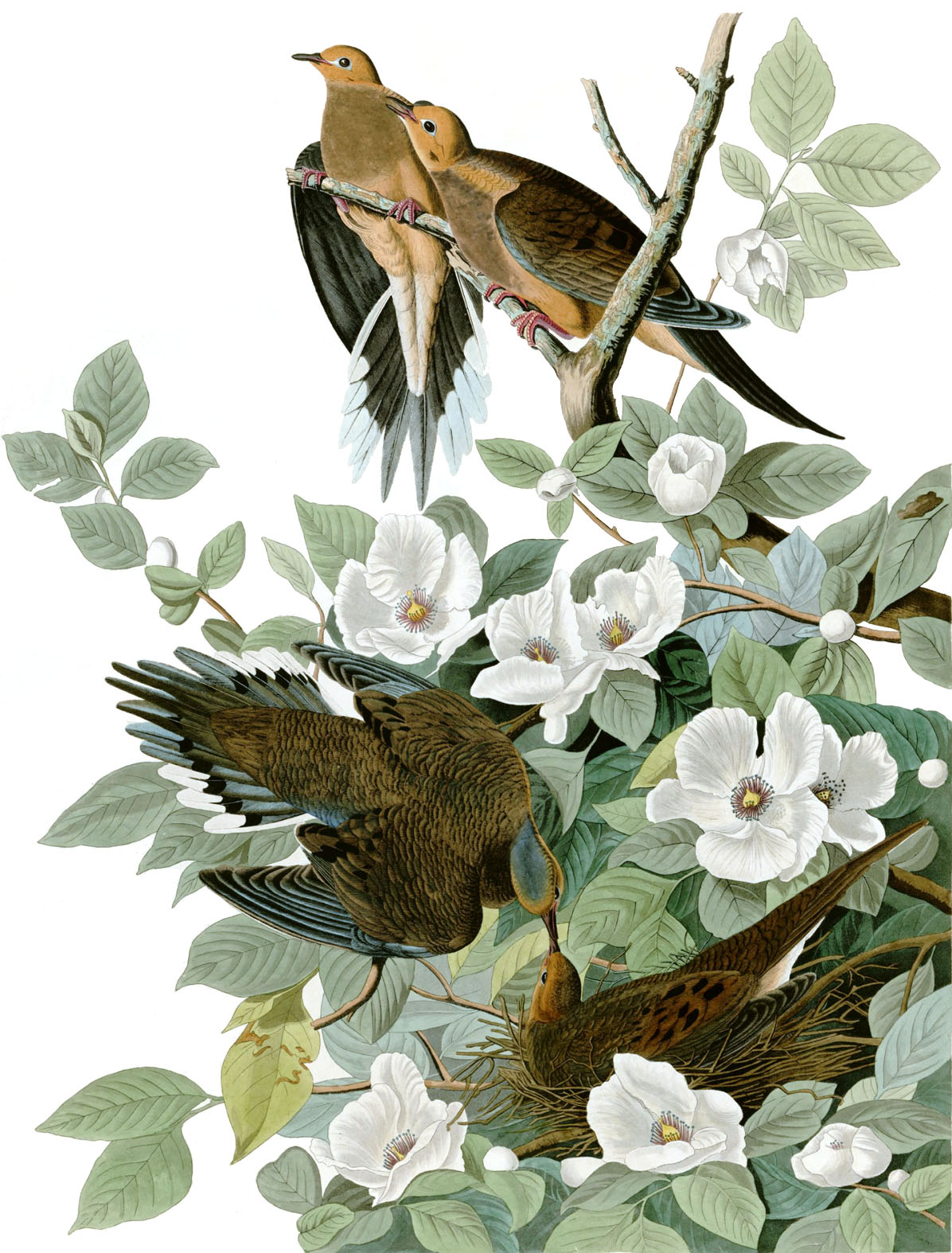
Hand-coloured engraving by John James Audubon, c. 1827–1838

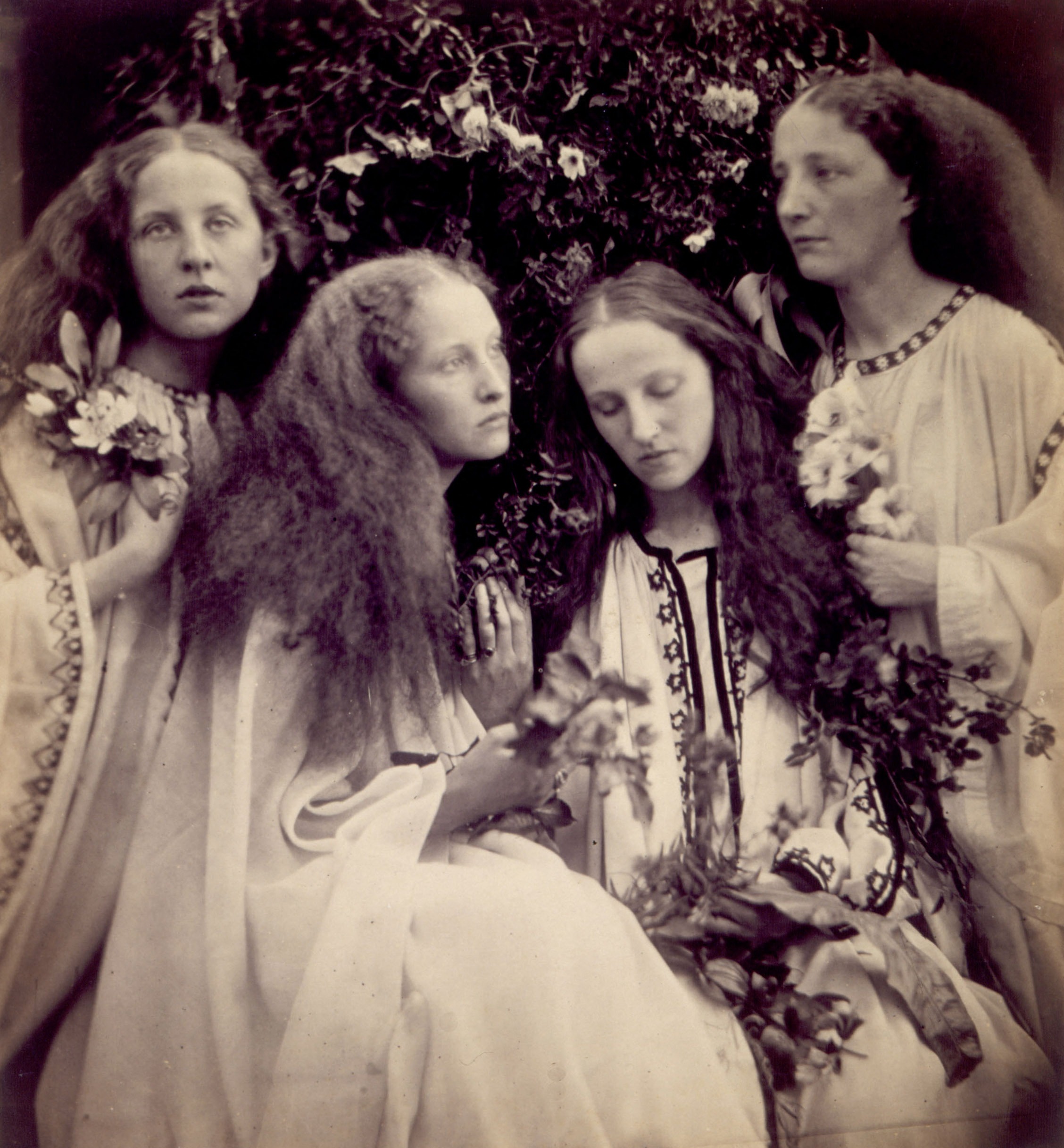
The Rosebud Garden of Girls by Julia Margaret Cameron, 1868

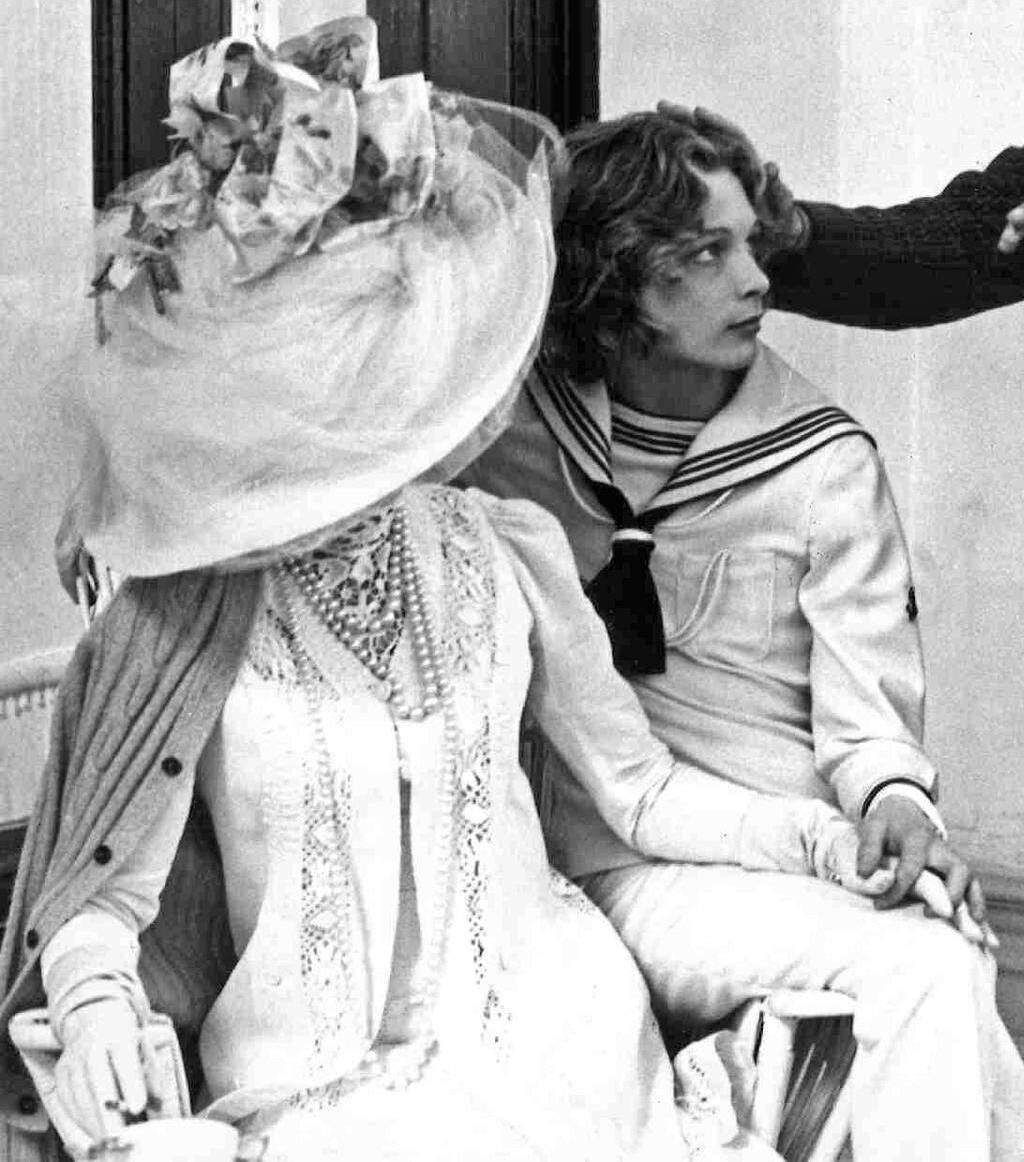
Tadzio in sailor suit with his mother, Death in Venice, 1971

Sarabande (Spring/Summer 2007) is the twenty-ninth collection McQueen designed for his eponymous fashion house. The concept was an exploration of fragility and decaying grandeur expressed through floral motifs. The name was taken from a style of music called the sarabande, which originated in sixteenth century colonial Latin America before being adopted in a slower form in Europe. According to Sarah Burton, McQueen's right-hand woman, the collection changed drastically during the working process, to a degree she considered unusual. Some items were discarded, while others, such as the tailcoats, were reworked. McQueen later described his work on the collection and its predecessor as his "second wind in fashion", saying that he was enjoying the process more than he had been.

Like much of McQueen's work, Sarabande drew on McQueen's favourite art. The collection was primarily inspired by Barry Lyndon, a 1975 film by Stanley Kubrick set in the eighteenth century, known for its themes of fatalism and romanticism. It also drew on the life and aesthetics of Italian socialite Luisa Casati (1881–1957), who was known as a muse for artists, going so far as to declare that she wanted to be "a living work of art." A 1908 portrait of her by Giovanni Boldini, which shows her in a black dress and large matching hat, was especially formative. The designs were also reminiscent of the costumes from the 1971 film Death in Venice, set in the European Belle Époque; it was one of McQueen's favourites. Early looks blended elements of the sailor suit worn by Tadzio, a young boy whose beauty is central to the film, and the black-and-white outfits worn by his mother. Sarabande also drew on Spanish painter Francisco Goya and the traditional clothing of Mexico and Spain.

=== Collection ===
The palette for Sarabande reflected the clothing worn during traditional English phases of mourning: shades of black, grey, and off-white, as well as dusky hues of pink, lavender, and mauve, which the Edwardians called "ashes of roses". This gave the collection an antiquated aesthetic, which McQueen compared to hand-tinted sepia prints by Victorian photographer Julia Margaret Cameron.

McQueen often revisited and refined ideas from earlier shows, and Sarabande was no exception. His characteristic tailoring appeared in slimline tailored suits, fitted riding jackets, and narrow dresses. Other designs showcased his interest in adapting and modernising historical styles. References to clothing of the eighteenth century and the Edwardian era were mediated through McQueen's love of the costume design from Barry Lyndon. The historicist designs were updated with modern flourishes such as asymmetry, especially a suite of high-low skirts with hems cut at calf length in the front and left long in the back.

Sarabande relied heavily on nature imagery for effect, especially English garden flowers, a contrast to McQueen's usual preference for depicting the natural world untouched by humanity. His depiction of florals for this collection was somewhat morbid. A few months after the show, he told Harper's Bazaar that he had been thinking of a series of photographs of dying fruit by his friend Sam Taylor-Wood: "Things rot. It was all about decay. I used flowers because they die." Some garments had embroidery of flowers, while some had full silk or fresh flowers stitched to them. A few dresses had petals trapped beneath chiffon, a style which evoked designs by Koji Tatsuno, a mentor of McQueen's. McQueen referenced Spanish designer Cristóbal Balenciaga in a set of dresses with puff skirts, especially Look 43, which has a three-tiered puff skirt that author Judith Watt described as "resembling an overblown exotic fungi". Birds and feathers appeared in delicate prints and embroidery, reflecting the ornithological art of John James Audubon. One gown was covered entirely in feathers.

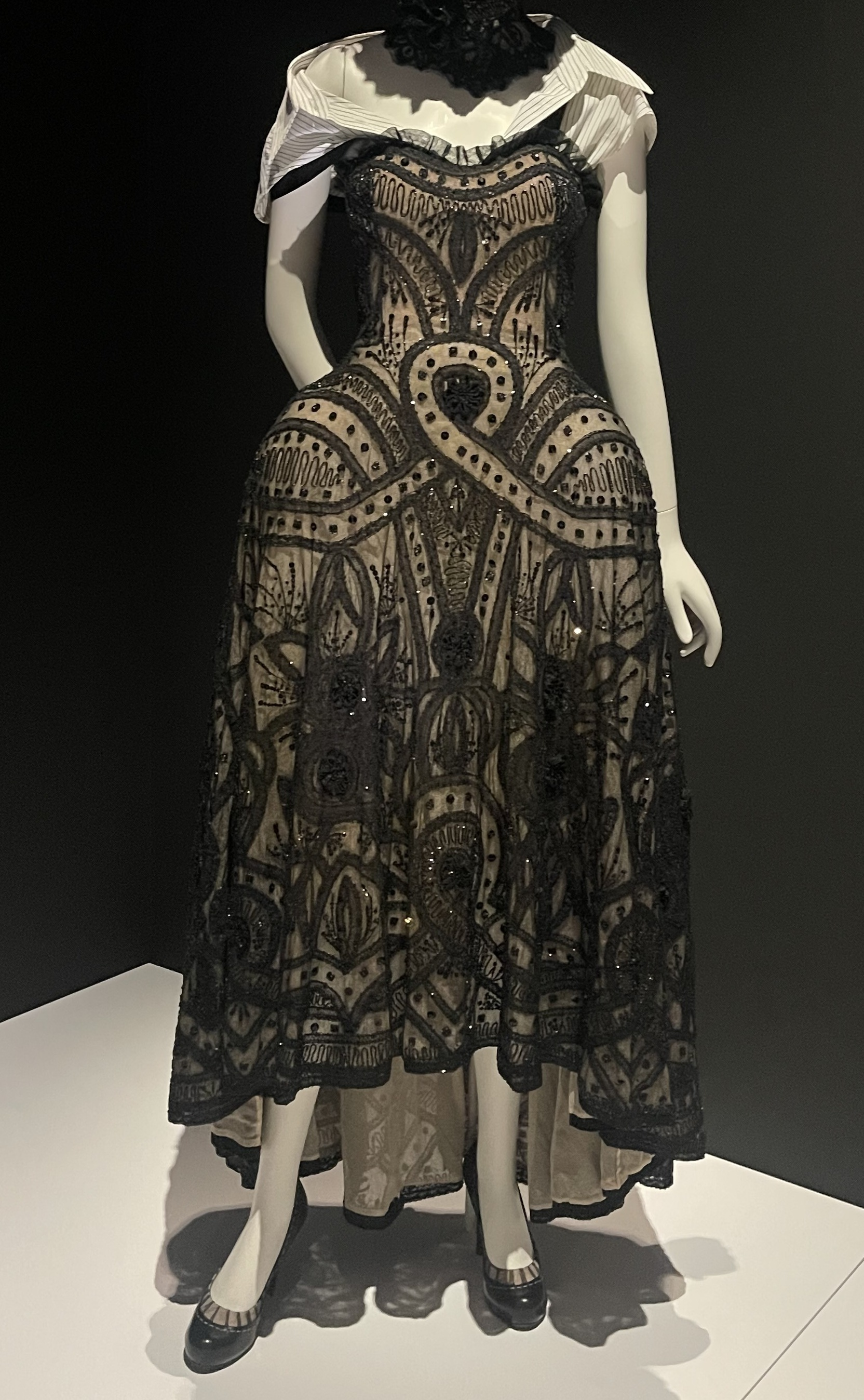
Dress with padded hips from Sarabande at Lee Alexander McQueen: Mind, Mythos, Muse (2023)

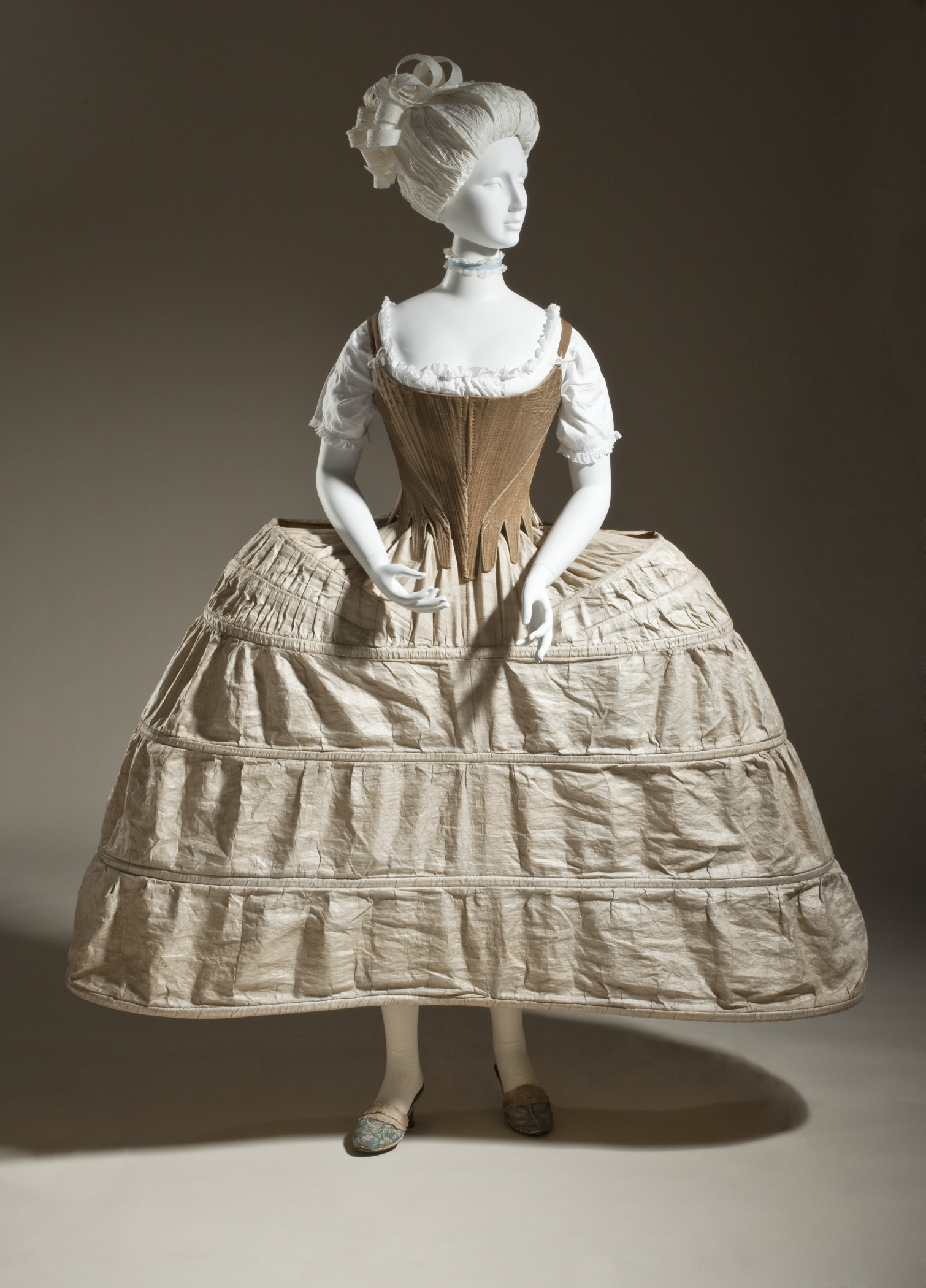
Panniers without an overskirt, English, 1750–80. Plain-woven linen and cane.

The collection focused on an exaggerated Edwardian hourglass silhouette with cinched waists and emphasised hips, which McQueen felt enhanced the natural sensuality of the female body. There were several "infanta" dresses, which have tight bodices and wide-hipped skirts; Balenciaga originated this style, drawing on Spanish court costume of the seventeenth century. For example, Look 18, a black lace dress with broad hips, echoes the wide-hipped silhouette common in the eighteenth century. The historical style was created by panniers, a type of stiff framework worn beneath skirts, but McQueen's version uses soft padding instead. Other historicist flourishes include lace, corsets, and puffed sleeves and shoulders.

Because of its multi-faceted inspiration, many elements can be seen as a reference to more than one source. The collection's ruffled shirts resembled men's shirts of the eighteenth century, as seen in Barry Lyndon, but were also reminiscent of traditional Spanish and Mexican clothing, which often feature ruffles and flounces. Sarabande revisited ideas from McQueen's earlier collection The Dance of the Twisted Bull (Spring/Summer 2002), which had been heavily inspired by Spanish matadors. Sarabande featured a short series of black-and-white ensembles with ruffled shirts and embroidery reminiscent of Spanish blackwork lace. Two of these had tight cropped trousers like the matador's taleguilla, and one had beadwork that visually resembled the matador's traditional braces.

McQueen worked with other creatives to produce things outside his area of expertise for runway shows, relying on longtime collaborators Philip Treacy and Shaun Leane for headpieces and jewellery, respectively. For Sarabande, Treacy created exaggerated hats in black silk, evoking oversized roses or the shape of the chaperon from the Jan van Eyck painting known as Portrait of a Man in a Turban (1433), which was beloved by McQueen's friend and muse Isabella Blow. Jewellery for the collection was fairly minimal. Look 21 featured a silver choker with rose thorns, drawing on similar items he had created for McQueen's Dante (Autumn/Winter 1996). There were also earrings and chokers with cameos and hair, reflecting Victorian mourning jewellery, which often included hair as a memento of the deceased. Early in his career, McQueen had referenced this practice by encasing locks of his own hair in the labels and linings of some garments.

=== Showpiece ensembles ===
I liked the padded hips because they didn’t make the dress look historical, but it made it look more sensual. Like the statue of [the Roman goddess] Diana with breasts and big hips. It’s more maternal, more womanly.

— Alexander McQueen, 2007, interview with Purple

Look 39 was a cream-coloured leather dress, hand-painted with birds and floral designs. Its rigid torso was moulded from Morgan's life casts, complete with breast shapes, abdominal muscles, and navel. Watt described the shape as having a "raw sexuality", tempered by the delicate paintwork.

Look 26, a short white dress, was paired on the runway with a take on a mantilla, a traditional Spanish veil, in grey rhinestone-accented lace. It was draped over a high flower crown and wrapped around the body like a cloak. Curator Kate Bethune found it reminiscent of a 1922 portrait of Casati by Ignacio Zuloaga. Katherine Knox wrote that it was "McQueen's take on a Victorian bride", but with a Gothic undertone that suggested "something sinister lurking beneath the bridal veil".

The last two ensembles, Looks 45 and 46, were companions. Look 45 was a knee-length mauve silk dress with bell sleeves and a wide boat neck, all filled with flowers in muted colours. A tightly cinched waist and padded hips created the collection's signature hourglass silhouette. The structural elements of the skirt were visible beneath the sheer fabric. The final piece, Look 46, was a nude silk organza gown sleeveless gown with a high collar. The body of the dress was covered with silk and fresh flowers, which, like in Look 45, also filled the inside of the neckline and sleeves. Taylor-Wood's dying fruit series was a major inspiration for these items, as was Garden (2000), an art installation by Marc Quinn which involved preserved frozen flowers.

== Runway show ==
The runway show was staged on 6 October 2006 at the Cirque d'Hiver in Paris. McQueen typically worked with a consistent creative team for his shows. His longtime collaborator Katy England was responsible for overall styling. Gainsbury & Whiting oversaw production. Joseph Bennett returned for set design. Eugene Souleiman styled hair, while Charlotte Tilbury handled make-up.

The soundtrack to the show comprised "Sarabande in Black", a new version of the fourth-movement sarabande from "Keyboard suite in D minor" by George Frideric Handel, which was featured in Barry Lyndon. "Sarabande in Black" was composed by Philip Sheppard. Compared to Handel's original, Sheppard's version is musically inverted and concludes with an instrumental arrangement of "Paint it Black" (1966) by The Rolling Stones. It was played live at the runway show by the Academy of St Martin in the Fields chamber orchestra, overlaid with the sound of Lancaster bombers.

Styling for models was melancholy, with funeral veils and unnaturally white faces. The skin tone was created by mixing white pigment with foundation, which was then brushed onto the face and neck, leaving deliberate visible brushstrokes on the neck and collarbone. Hair appeared to be haphazardly pinned up, with wisps coming loose. Some had braids similar to those in the mother-and-child portrait Mexico City (1934) by Henri Cartier-Bresson.

The set was designed to resemble an abandoned theatre, with the audience seated around the wood-floored circular stage in an in-the-round configuration. The orchestra was seated on the stage in two groups facing one another, wearing grey dresses and suits. A large glass chandelier hung at floor level between them, draped with fake cobwebs and torn chiffon to make it appear old and abandoned.

I recall the expression on his face in 2006 when the orchestra played Handel's "Sarabande" as the last dress, made entirely of roses and not quite finished, sewn together at the very last minute, left a trail of loose flowers along the catwalk [...] It could have been a disaster; instead, it was a small miracle, backstage was full of ecstatic joy.

— Photographer Anne Deniau, reflecting on Sarabande in her book Love Looks Not With the Eyes (2012)

The show opened with the lit chandelier rising to the ceiling with the rest of the room in darkness, reminiscent of a scene from Barry Lyndon. The lights went up when it reached its apex, and models began to enter through a draped opening at the rear of the stage. The models walked in a figure eight around the two orchestra groups before exiting. McQueen's usual stage theatrics were kept to a minimum, apart from the chandelier and orchestra.

Forty-six looks were presented, opening with a focus on tailored or slimline looks before turning to designs with exaggerated hips and hourglass silhouettes at Look 18. The collection closed with a strong emphasis on floral motifs and dresses were covered or filled with flowers. Look 46, the last dress, was covered with silk and fresh flowers, which were sewn on just before the model walked out onto the runway. Loosely attached, the flowers began falling off onto the runway while the model was walking. Although many audience members assumed this had been carefully staged, the effect was completely accidental, and has been described as a moment of serendipitous beauty.

After the final model exited, the lights went down briefly, leaving only the chandelier lit while the orchestra continued to play. The lights came back up and the models came out for their final turn, re-ordered to reflect the traditional English sequence of mourning colours: first, black ensembles for full mourning, then mixed grey and off-white looks for secondary mourning, and finally, dusky pink, lavender, and mauve for half-mourning. McQueen came out for his bow while they were walking. The lights dimmed again as they exited for the final time. The orchestra concluded in darkness and exited the stage.

== Reception ==
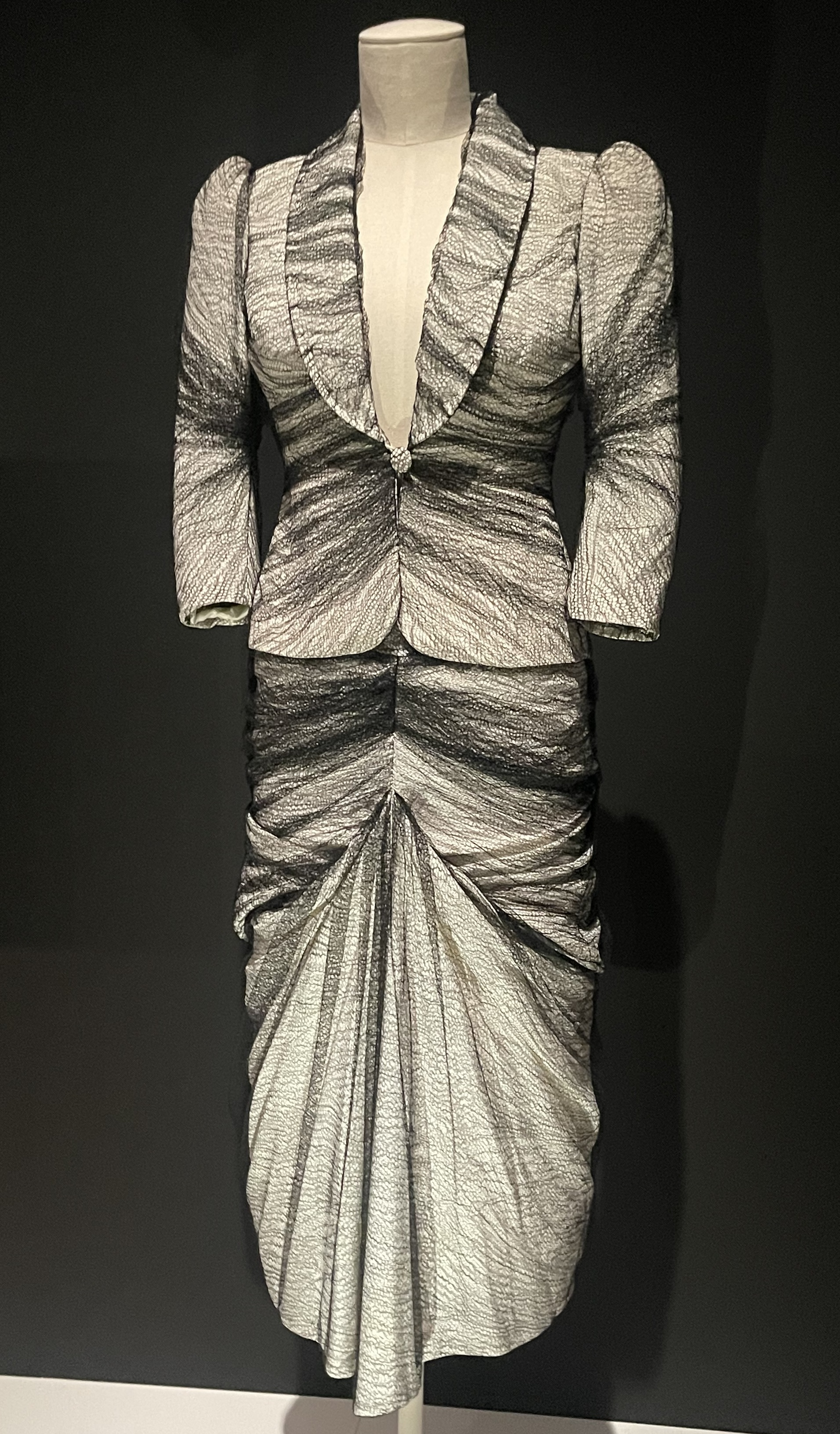
Look 23 at Mind, Mythos, Muse

Sarabande was well received by contemporary reviewers, who saw it as a successful follow-up to the previous season's critically lauded Widows of Culloden. Sarah Mower of Vogue felt that McQueen had balanced artistry with commercial considerations, which he had not always managed in the past. She called the collection "a revision of all the things the designer does best", highlighting wearable, modern items such as an asymmetrical tunic with ruffles of pink lace as standouts. Olivier Zahm of Purple magazine wrote that the clothes in Sarabande "invoke the grace, elegance, and underlying sexuality of bygone eras, as if to mask in fragile beauty the violent masochism of today".

Imogen Fox of The Guardian was more ambivalent. Although she appreciated the show's portrayal of "eerie decaying grandeur", the dresses seemed unrealistic to her, "more like costume" than wearable fashion. Conversely, she felt the tailored jackets were wearable and would continue to be commercially popular.

The flower-filled dresses garnered much attention. Although the flowers falling off the final dress was a serendipitous effect, many critics have taken it as a demonstration of the fragility of life. Knox called the flower-filled dresses "on par with couture sensibilities" in terms of their craftsmanship. Watt wrote that the final look was "one of his most exaggerated and thought-provoking pieces". Ana Finel Honigman identified the final gown as one of McQueen's signature garments.

The collection is well-regarded in retrospect. Curator Claire Wilcox wrote that in the collection, "function and beauty were disdained for a luxurious impracticality and historicist beauty". Sarah Burton recalled it as one of McQueen's most iconic shows. Watt called it "near-perfect". In 2015, I-D magazine deemed the floral finale gown one of the defining looks of McQueen's career.

== Analysis ==
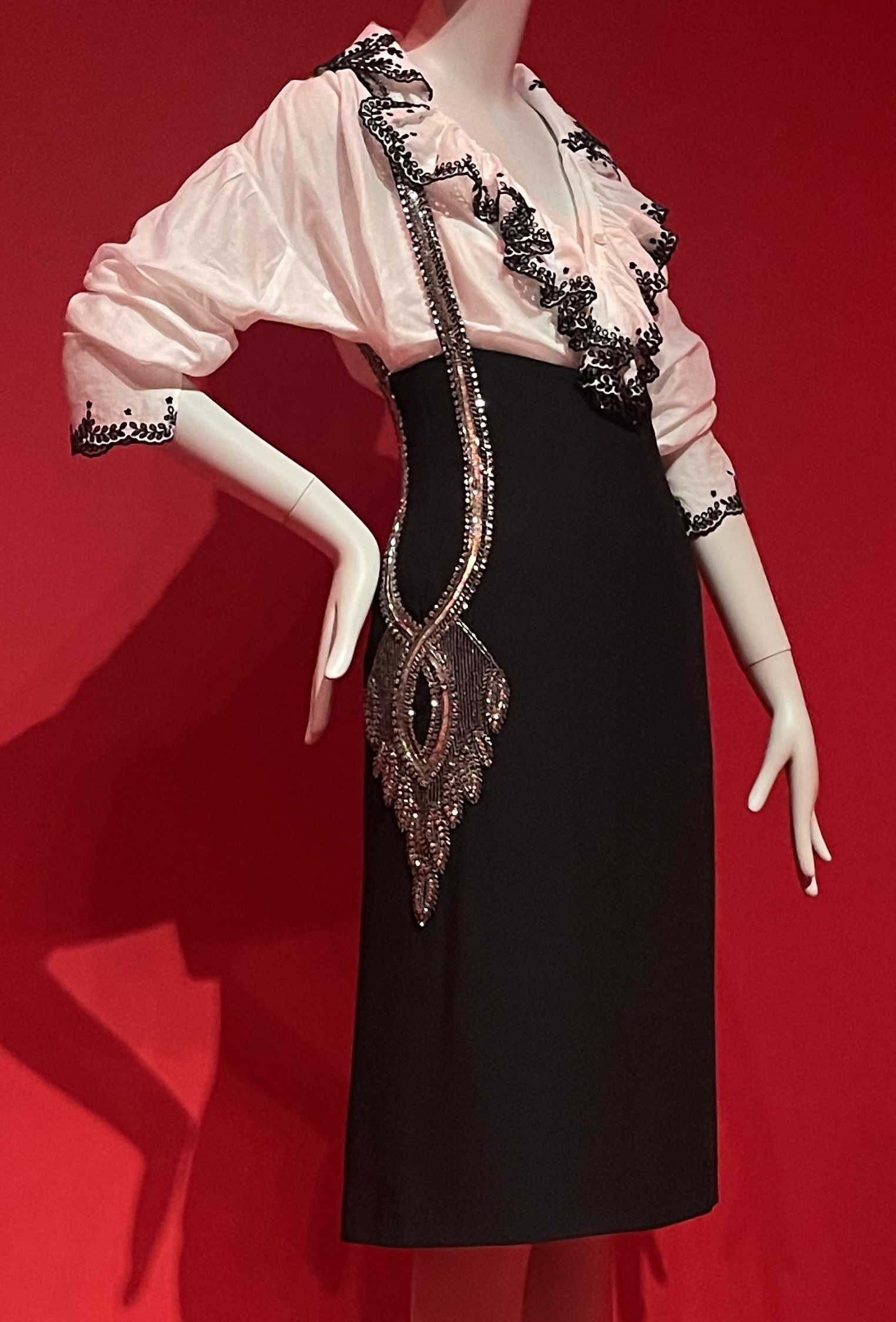
Beadwork resembling matador's braces

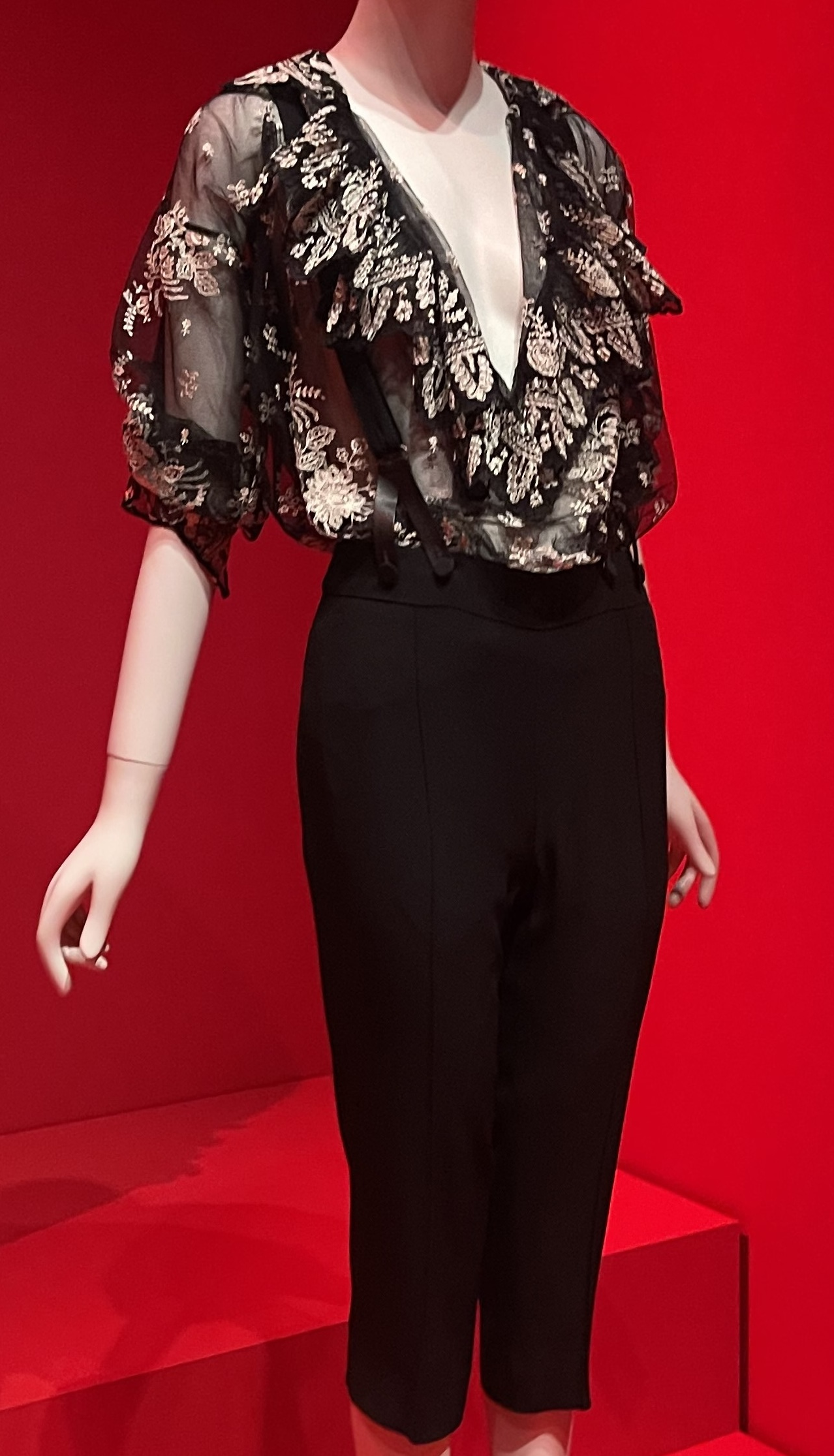
Tightly cropped trousers like the matador's taleguilla

Matador-inspired ensembles at Mind, Mythos, Muse

Most analysis has focused on the collection's historicist and cinematic references. Textile curators Clarissa M. Esguerra and Michaela Hansen wrote that the collection, with its references to Barry Lyndon, "underscores the artistic proficiencies shared by Kubrick and McQueen, including craftsmanship, singular vision, and an exceptional capacity for worldmaking". They felt that McQueen's work also echoed Goya's "honest approach to depicting humanity". Film historian Alastair O'Neill felt that the collection's interpretation of the eighteenth century as mediated through a twentieth century film was typical of how McQueen engaged in historicism. For him, this was most clear in the use of "Paint it Black" for the finale; the song had appeared in another Kubrick film, Full Metal Jacket (1987) and in McQueen's Autumn/Winter 1996 show, Dante. He thought McQueen was commenting on the use of music in film and in his own shows by reusing a song that referenced both.

The floral finale dresses have also drawn comment. According to Watt, the abundant flowers in these dresses served as a metaphor for "female fecundity". Honigman felt the muted colours of the flowers gave these looks a "melancholic" look, representing the slow process of ageing and decay rather than a sudden death. She argued that the flowers in the finale dress "appeared to overtake the model", giving it a "sense of uncontrollable, wild growth" that was "beyond humanity's control".

Watt felt the hourglass silhouette from Sarabande was the first sign of the rounded "carapace" silhouette McQueen would bring to his final collections, especially Plato's Atlantis (Spring/Summer 2010). Writer Cassandra Atherton described using several McQueen collections, including Sarabande, in a university-level creative writing course to teach a connection between poetry and fashion, particularly how one can inspire the other.

== Legacy ==
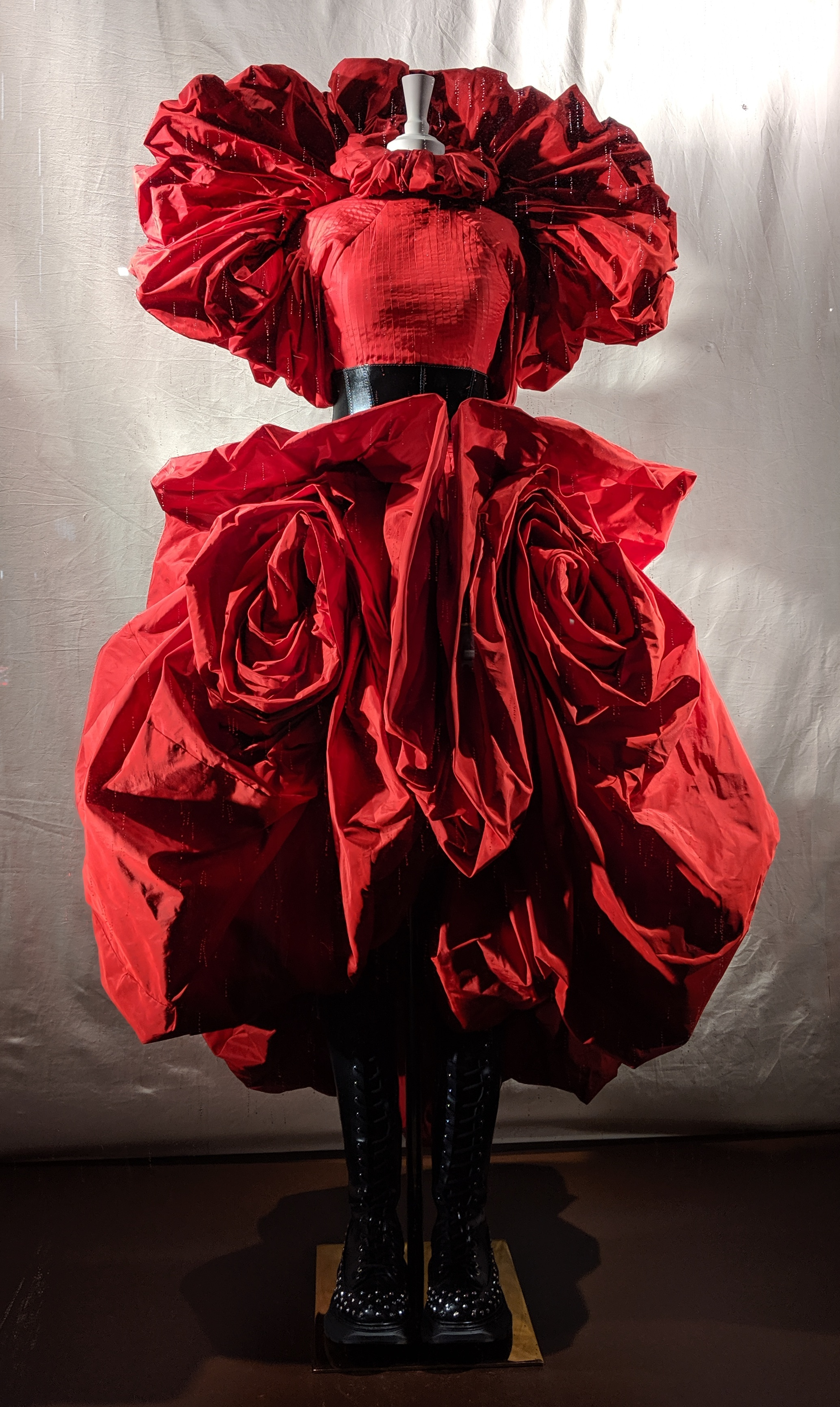
Red Rose dress by Sarah Burton for Alexander McQueen, Autumn/Winter 2019

The final gown was reconstructed after the show, the fresh flowers replaced by silk reconstructions by Blumen. The Sarabande Foundation, a charity established by McQueen and funded by his estate, takes its name from this collection. Following McQueen's suicide in 2010, Burton succeeded him as creative director of the brand. Roses continued to be a recurring motif for the brand under her leadership; they reminded Burton of young women being chosen as the Rose Queen at spring festivals during her childhood.

The Metropolitan Museum of Art (the Met) in New York City owns Look 22, a white cocktail dress with black tulle overlay. The Victoria and Albert Museum of London owns a grey pinstriped wool pantsuit from the collection. The National Gallery of Victoria owns Look 12, an ensemble comprising a blouse and a skirt with bird print, and Look 20, a black evening dress. The Los Angeles County Museum of Art (LACMA) owns several items from the collection: a jacket, two dresses, three blouses, two skirts, a pair of trousers, and three pairs of shoes.

Socialite Daphne Guinness was photographed by Sølve Sundsbø wearing Look 41, a full-length gown in lilac tulle with padded hips. Tim Walker photographed Look 43 for a Vogue editorial, while Paolo Roversi photographed Look 9 for another. Annabelle Neilson, a model and friend of McQueen's, posed for Lee Jenkins wearing Look 42 for the magazine's March 2007 issue. Paris Jackson wore a copy of Look 20, a black lace off-the-shoulder dress, in the music video for her song "Let Down" (2020).

Neilson died in 2018; in 2020, her collection of McQueen designs was auctioned, including several items from Sarabande. Her copy of Look 20 sold for £15,600, a jacket with veil from Look 21 sold for £1,820, and the rose thorn choker from the same look sold for £10,400. Fashion dealer Steven Philip auctioned his collection in 2023, including a number of archival McQueen pieces. A black and ivory ruffled gown from Sarabande, a variation of Look 10 from the runway, sold for £7,800.

=== Exhibitions ===
Look 21, a hooded black suit paired with a Shaun Leane thorn necklace, appeared in Gothic: Dark Glamour, a 2008 exhibition at the Museum at FIT in New York.

The 2011 exhibition Alexander McQueen: Savage Beauty, originally at the Metropolitan Museum of Art, featured four ensembles from Sarabande: Look 25, a white knee-length dress with black lace overlay and vertically puffed sleeves; Look 39, the white leather moulded dress hand-painted with birds; and looks 45 and 46, the final two gowns filled with flowers. The accessories section of the exhibit featured a pair of earrings with cameos, with matching locket on black ribbon, and the white and tan pony-skin corset from Look 8.

The final gown was a centrepiece of a 2019 exhibition called Roses at the Alexander McQueen Old Bond Street store. It was displayed alongside the Red Rose dress by Burton from the brand's Autumn/Winter 2019 collection. The items owned by the LACMA appeared in the exhibition Lee Alexander McQueen: Mind, Mythos, Muse, originally staged in 2022.

== Bibliography ==
- Alexander McQueen | Women's Spring/Summer 2007 | Runway Show. Alexander McQueen. 15 March 2012 – via YouTube.
- Arnold, Catharine (2007). Necropolis: London and Its Dead. London: Pocket Books. ISBN 978-1-4165-0248-7.
- Atherton, Cassandra (2012). "The Haunting: Poetry and Fashion in the Creative Writing Workshop". Writing on the Edge. 23 (1): 47–53. ISSN 1064-6051. JSTOR 43157472.
- Bolton, Andrew (2011). Alexander McQueen: Savage Beauty. New York City: Metropolitan Museum of Art. ISBN 978-1-58839-412-5.
- Bowles, Hamish (2014). Vogue & the Metropolitan Museum of Art Costume Institute: Parties, Exhibitions, People (1st ed.). New York: Condé Nast. ISBN 978-1-4197-1424-5.
- Deniau, Anne (2012). Love Looks Not with the Eyes: Thirteen Years with Lee Alexander McQueen. Abrams. ISBN 978-1-61312-415-4. Archived from the original on 27 April 2023.
- Esguerra, Clarissa M.; Hansen, Michaela (2022). Lee Alexander McQueen: Mind, Mythos, Muse. New York City: Delmonico Books. ISBN 978-1-63681-018-8.
- Fairer, Robert; Wilcox, Claire (2016). Alexander McQueen: Unseen. New Haven, Connecticut: Yale University Press. ISBN 978-0-300-22267-8.
- Fennetaux, Ariane (Autumn 2018). "Birds of a Feather: Alexander McQueen's Victorian Bestiary". Cahiers victoriens et édouardiens (in French) (88). doi:10.4000/cve.4328. ISSN 0220-5610.
- Fox, Chloe (2012). Vogue On: Alexander McQueen. Vogue on Designers. London: Quadrille Publishing. ISBN 978-1849491136.
- Gleason, Katherine (2012). Alexander McQueen: Evolution. New York City: Race Point Publishing. ISBN 978-1-61058-837-9.
- Haye, Amy de la (2020). The Rose in Fashion: Ravishing. New Haven, Connecticut: Yale University Press. ISBN 978-0-300-25008-4. Archived from the original on 14 January 2023.
- Homer, Karen (2023). Little Book of Alexander McQueen: The Story of the Iconic Brand. London: Welbeck Publishing Group. ISBN 978-1-80279-270-6.
- Honigman, Ana Finel (2021). What Alexander McQueen Can Teach You About Fashion. London: Frances Lincoln. ISBN 978-0-7112-5906-5.
- Knox, Kristin (2010). Alexander McQueen: Genius of a Generation. London: A&C Black. ISBN 978-1-4081-3223-4.
- Mora, Juliana Luna; Berry, Jess (September 2022). "Creative Direction Succession in Luxury Fashion: The Illusion of Immortality at Chanel and Alexander McQueen". Luxury. 9 (2–3): 117–140. doi:10.1080/20511817.2022.2194039. ISSN 2051-1817.
- Thomas, Dana (2015). Gods and Kings: The Rise and Fall of Alexander McQueen and John Galliano. New York City: Penguin Publishing. ISBN 978-1-101-61795-3. OCLC 951153602.
- Watt, Judith (2012). Alexander McQueen: The Life and the Legacy. New York City: Harper Design. ISBN 978-1-84796-085-6.
- Wilcox, Claire, ed. (2015). Alexander McQueen. New York City: Abrams Books. ISBN 978-1-4197-1723-9.
  - Bethune, Kate. "Encyclopedia of Collections". In Wilcox (2015), pp. 303–326.
  - Bolton, Andrew. "In Search of the Sublime". In Wilcox (2015), pp. 15–21.
  - Evans, Caroline. "Modelling McQueen: Hard Grace". In Wilcox (2015), pp. 189–201.
  - Miller, Janice. "Making-Up". In Wilcox (2015), pp. 234–241.
  - O'Neill, Alistair. "The Shining and Chic". In Wilcox (2015), pp. 261–280.
  - Townsend, Eleanor. "Memento Mori". In Wilcox (2015), pp. 159–163.
  - Wilcox, Claire. "Edward Scissorhands". In Wilcox (2015), pp. 25–33.
- Wilson, Andrew (2015). Alexander McQueen: Blood Beneath the Skin. New York City: Simon and Schuster. ISBN 978-1-4767-7674-3.
- Worsley, Harriet (2009). The White Dress. London: Laurence King Publishing. ISBN 978-1-85669-560-2.
