= Let Down =

Let Down may refer to:

== Music ==
- "Let Down" (Bif Naked song)
- "Let Down" (Dead by Sunrise song)
- "Let Down" (Paris Jackson song)
- "Let Down" (Radiohead song)

== Medicine ==
- Let-down reflex, a release of milk from a lactating woman's nipples
