= Wilted (album) =

Studio album by Paris Jackson
- Released: November 13, 2020
- Recorded: 2020
- Genres: Alternative folk; folk rock
- Length: 44:45
- Label: Republic
- Producers: Andy Hull; Jamie Martens; Robert McDowell

Paris Jackson chronology
Wilted (2020)	The Lost EP (2022)

Singles from wilted
- 1. "Let Down" Released: October 30, 2020

wilted (stylized in all lowercase) is the debut studio album by American singer-songwriter Paris Jackson. The album has received positive reviews from critics for Jackson's collaboration with producer Andy Hull and the strength of the release as a debut album, but also received criticism for inconsistent quality and poor lyrics.

== Recording and release ==
“I feel like that’s something that everybody can relate to in their own way. I love the idea that love is a flower that blooms, and if it’s not taken care of, as anything, it will wilt, it will die. And sometimes that’s just a part of life. I love metaphors and the flower was the perfect metaphor for this.”

— Jackson on the album title

Wilted is Jackson's first solo album, although she also released an extended play with the group The Soundflowers earlier in 2020. This release is a concept album centered on “heartbreak, betrayal, grief and rebirth” that tells Jackson's life story and the songwriting process was motivated by pain. To capture those emotions on record, she collaborated with Andy Hull of Manchester Orchestra, whose music helped her during the mourning period following the death of her father Michael. The duo co-wrote most songs on the album, with songwriting happening between January and July 2020, with the concept album theme emerging as the songs were recorded during a break in Hull's usual touring schedule due to the COVID-19 pandemic.

Jackson began by writing the songs on guitar and recording demos that she brought to Hull to complete. In terms of genre and mood, Jackson sought out several distinct sounds, textures, and influences, looking to emulate her musical favorites, particularly Manchester Orchestra and Radiohead, particularly the latter's vocalist Thom Yorke. She has also suggested that the songs have a folk basis that recalls 2000s rock bands, such as Cage the Elephant and Grandaddy for instrumentation and folk singers Ray LaMontagne and Damien Rice for lyrical inspiration. She has classified the music as alternative folk.

The album was only announced two weeks before release and was preceded by the single "let down", written by Jackson and the song has an accompanying music video. "Eyelids" also had a music video in March 2021. She also promoted the release with an appearance on Jimmy Kimmel Live! in late November 2020, but had to delay a full tour due to the pandemic.

== Reception ==
Editors at AllMusic Guide scored this release four out of five stars, with critic Neil Z. Yeung noting the strength of several tracks and concluding that while the release "brims with the grief of a devastated spirit, it's a fully immersive experience that ends up being extremely cathartic, a remarkable first solo statement from a promising young voice with a depth beyond her years". Writing in Rolling Stone, Keith Harris gave this release 3.5 out of five stars, comparing the songs to the Cranberries and noting Hull's "expansive and echoey production, dominated by electric guitars that chime then reverberate into infinity" that leads to "a cozily wistful melancholy", but criticizes Jackson's lyrics as uneven.

Hannah Mylrea of NME rated Wilted three out of five stars, characterizing it as "a collection of 11 intimate songs that’ll fit like your favorite sweater" that is "intriguing" due to the singer's collaborators that create "haunting layered vocals, gleaming electric guitar licks and weird chord progressions", but she also notes the weakness of some lyrics, summing up that it's "enthralling, inconsistent and, at times, excellent. Ultimately, this is a glimpse of the artist that Jackson could be." The Times' Will Hodgkinson also gave this three out of five stars calling the music "meandering, hippie-friendly, acoustic folk rock" paired with Jackson's "nicely languid voice" and opining "although it isn’t dynamic or original enough to make an impact, there’s something sweet and sincere about it all"; he looks forward to future releases from Jackson.

== Track listing ==
All songs written by Andy Hull and Paris Jackson, except where noted. All song and album titles are styled in lowercase.

1. "Collide" – 2:54
2. "Undone" – 4:41
3. "Repair" – 4:16
4. "Cosmic (Wait for Me)" – 4:10
5. "Dead Sea" – 4:21
6. "Let Down" (Jackson) – 4:16
7. "Eyelids" – 3:25
8. "Scorpio Rising" – 4:07
9. "Freight Train" – 3:11
10. "Wilted" – 4:26
11. "Another Spring" (Jackson) – 4:50

== Personnel ==
- Paris Jackson – vocals
- Paul Blakemore – mastering
- Dan Hannon – acoustic and electric guitar, bass guitar, drums, piano, spoken word, engineering
- Andy Hull – acoustic bass guitar, bass guitar, drums, electric and acoustic guitar, keyboards, backing vocals, production
- Catherine Marks – mixing
- Jamie Martens – assistant engineering, production, assistant mastering
- Robert McDowell – guitar, keyboards, piano, production

== See also ==
- List of 2020 albums
