= Elizabeth Howe =

Accused in the Salem witch trials (c. 1637–1692)

- Born: Elizabeth Jackson c. 1637; Yorkshire, England
- Died: July 19, 1692 (aged 56–57); Salem, Massachusetts Bay Colony
- Cause of death: Executed by hanging
- Known for: Salem witch trials
- Spouse: James Howe II (m. 1658)
- Children: 6

Elizabeth Howe (née Jackson; c. 1637 – July 19, 1692) was one of the accused in the Salem witch trials. She was found guilty and executed on July 19, 1692.

== Early life ==
Elizabeth Jackson was born around 1637 near Rowley, Yorkshire, the daughter of William and Joanne Jackson. Elizabeth married James Howe II in 1658 in Ipswich, Massachusetts. The couple lived in Topsfield, Massachusetts and had six children:

- James Howe III (born 1659)
- Elizabeth Howe Jr. (born 1661)
- Mary Howe (born 1664)
- Deborah Howe (born 1667)
- John Howe (born 1671)
- Abigail Howe (born 1673)

Topsfield was a Puritan community. They were a deeply pious society, with an extreme religious focus not only as a community but also on an individual basis. They believed firmly in the devil, and felt that he was not only an enemy to mankind, but to the Puritans specifically. "The devil, as envisioned by the people of Salem, was a short, black man with cloven feet who stood about as high as a walking stick". The fight against the devil was viewed as an individual religious responsibility.

== Accused of witchcraft ==
The Perley (also spelled Pearly) family of Ipswich, Massachusetts, were among the chief accusers of Elizabeth Howe. They had a ten-year-old daughter they claimed was being afflicted by Howe. The child complained of being pricked by pins and sometimes fell into fits. In their testimony against Howe, on June 1, 1692, they quoted their daughter as saying, "I could never afflict a dog as Good Howe afflicts me." At first the parents did not believe their daughter's accusations. They took the child to several doctors who told them she was "under an evil hand". Her condition continued for two or three years, until "she pined away to skin and bones and ended her sorrowful life". Howe was accused of afflicting several other girls within Salem Village. The identities of the girls Elizabeth Howe was accused of afflicting are recorded in the transcript of her examination:

- Mercy Lewis was nineteen years old during the Salem trials. When her entire family was killed in an Indian attack she was sent to be a servant in the house of Thomas Putnam. Mercy Lewis acted as key player in the accusation of Elizabeth Howe, as well as many other individuals in Salem Village. Mercy Lewis was a major contributor of spectral evidence in the examination of Elizabeth Howe. She threw herself to the floor in a fit as soon as Howe entered the meeting house.
- Mary Walcott played a significant role in the Salem trials, being one of the original girls to become "afflicted". Her name not only appeared on the arrest warrant served to Elizabeth Howe but appeared in one of two indictments. Her cousin, Ann Putnam, Jr., was one of the most active accusers.
- Ann Putnam, Jr. was one of the "afflicted" girls. She was one of the most aggressive accusers, her name appearing over 400 times in court documents. Ann was twelve years old at the start of the trials. She accused nineteen people and saw eleven of them hanged. This is a significant amount when one considers the fact that only nineteen people total hanged because of the accusations against them. In 1706, Ann Putnam, Jr. apologized for her actions; she was the only "afflictee" to do so publicly.

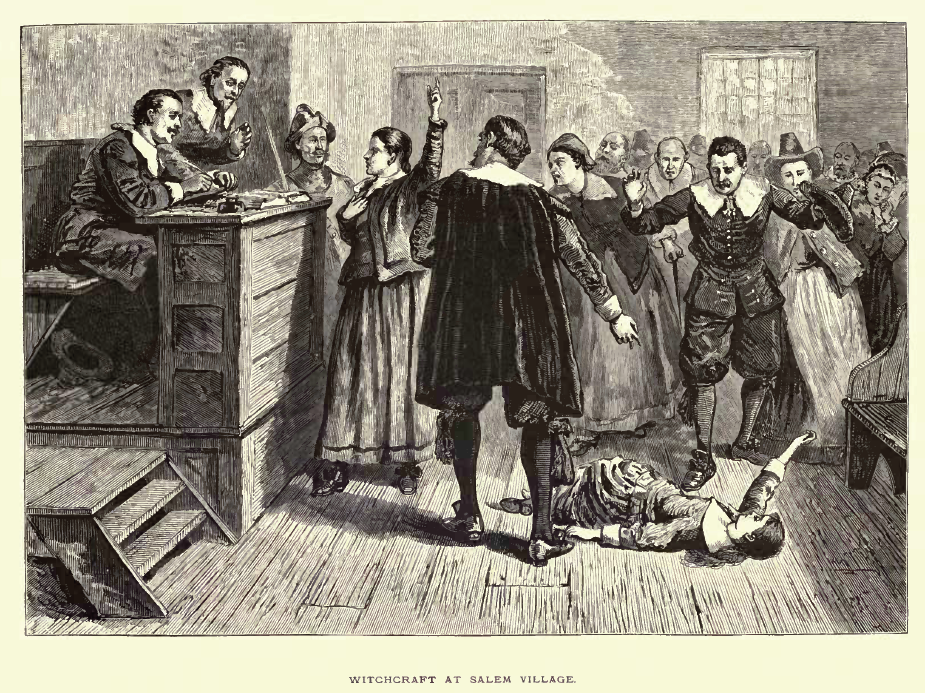
Ann Putnam

- Abigail Williams was 11 at the time of Elizabeth Howe's trial in 1692. She was one of the most well-known "afflicted" girls in the Salem witch trials. Her name appeared on the arrest warrant for Elizabeth Howe. She was the niece of Reverend Samuel Parris, reverend of Salem Village and was one of the first two girls to become "afflicted".
- Mary Warren was 21 when the trials began. She was employed as a servant in the house of John Proctor of Salem Village. Warren participated in some of the "afflicted girls" accusations before confessing that the other girls were lying. However, they turned on her and Warren herself was eventually tried for being a witch. She escaped conviction by changing sides again, accusing her employer and his wife of "certain deeds, although she hesitated to call them a witch and a wizard".

== Warrant for arrest ==
On May 28, 1692, a warrant was released for the arrest of Elizabeth Howe by John Hathorne and Jonathan Corwin. She was to be apprehended and taken to the home of Lieutenant Nathaniel Ingersolls. She stood charged with "Sundry Acts of Witch-craft done or [committed] on the [bodies] of Mary Walcott, Abigail Williams, and others of Salem Village." She was apprehended by Ephraim Wildes, constable of Tops-field, on May 29, 1692. A copy of her original warrant can be read below. This transcript was taken from The Salem Witchcraft Papers.

To the Constable of Topsfield
Your are in they're Majestyes Names hereby Required to Apprehend & bring before us Elizabeth Howe the wife of James Howe if Topsfeild Husbandman on Tuesday next being the thirty first day of may about Ten of the Clock forenoone att the house: of Leut Nathaniell Ingersolls of Salem Village, Whoe stande Charged w'th Sundry Acts of Witch-craft done or Committed on the bodyes of Mary Walcott, Abigaill Williams & others of Salem Village, to theyr great hurt, in order to hir examination, Relating to the above s'd premises. & hereof you are nott to fayle.
Dat'd. Salem. May. 28th. 1692/
In obedience to this warrant I have appreend [r] ed Elizabeth Howe the wife of Jems how on the 29th of may 1692 and have brought har unto the house of leftenant nathaniell engleson according too to the warrant as attested by me Ephraim Wildes constabell
For the town of Topsfelld.

Dated May 31st 1692

== Imprisonment ==
The accused "witches" were, "bound with cords and irons for months, subjected to insulting, unending examinations and excommunication from the church". In Marion L. Starkey's The Devil in Massachusetts it says, "... they were periodically subjected by prison officials, especially by the juries assigned to search them for witch marks". While Elizabeth Howe was imprisoned in these conditions she was able to rely on the support of her family. Her daughters, and occasionally her blind husband, would take turns in making regular trips to Boston. Starkey said they would bring her "country butter, clean linen, and comfort".

== Trial ==
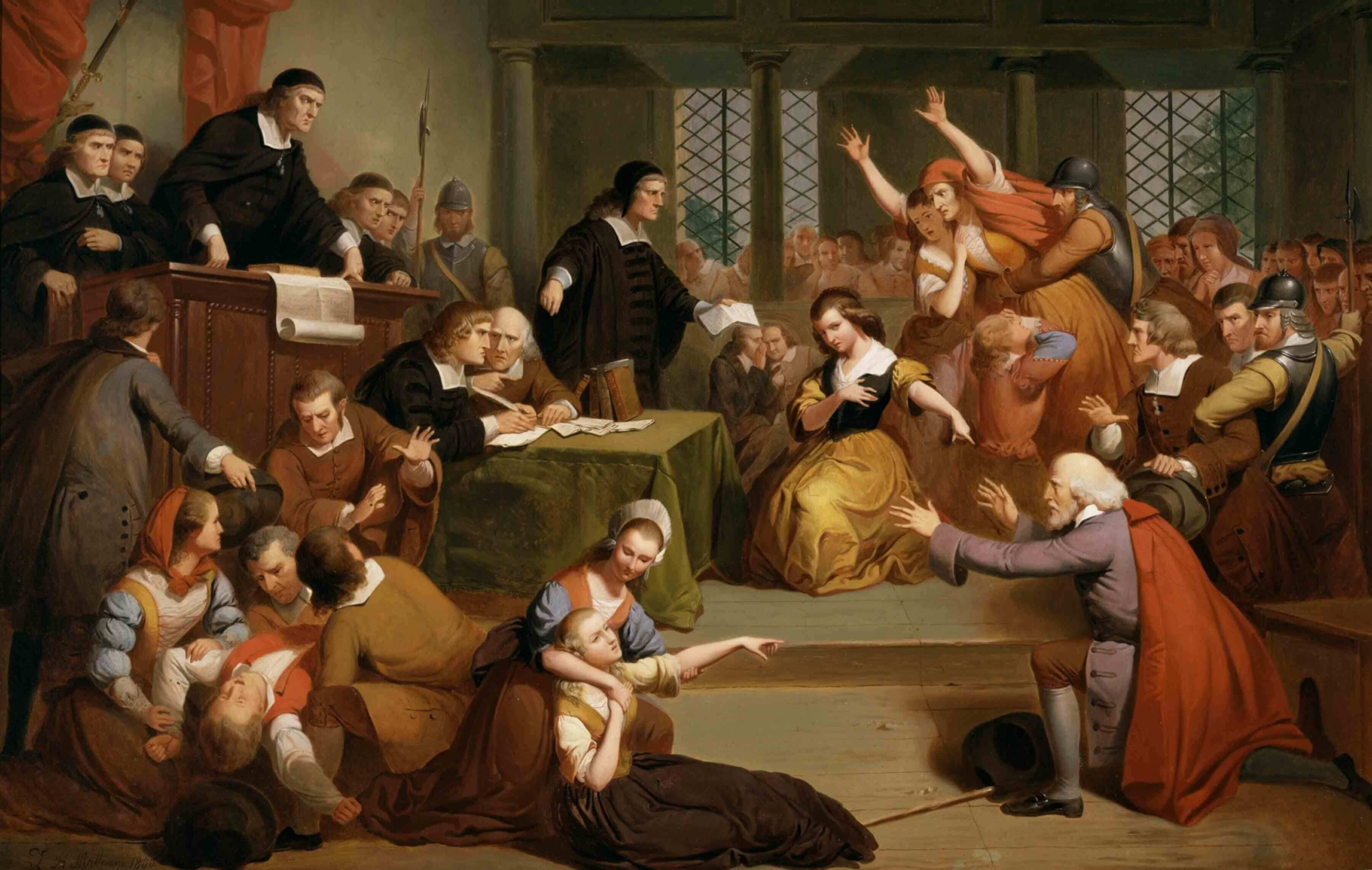
Chaos in the Courtroom

Court conditions verged on the point of ridiculous during the Salem witch trials. There are many pauses in court records because of the chaos that surrounded trials of the supposed witches. For instance, "afflicted" girls would throw themselves on the ground in hysterical fits, and when the examinant moved their body the afflicted individuals would cry out in pain. Magistrate Samuel Sewall of Boston recorded his observation about the conditions he found in the meeting house. His diary reads, "Went to Salem, where in the meeting house, the persons accused of witchcraft were examined ... 'twas awful to see how the afflicted persons were agitated".

Such was the case of Elizabeth Howe's trial which began on May 31, 1692. The following is a true account of the examination of Elizabeth Howe as witnessed by Samuel Parris. This account is taken from The Salem Witchcraft Papers, Transcripts of the Legal Documents from the Salem Witch Trials. When Howe was brought in for examination Mercy Lewis and Mary Walcott, two of her main accusers, fell into a fit. She was accused by Mary of pinching and choking her in the month of May. Ann Putnam, Jr. added her accusations to these by saying she had been hurt three times by Howe. When asked how she pleaded to the charges made against her, Elizabeth Howe boldly responded, "If it was the last moment I was to live, God knows I am innocent of any thing of this nature."

Actual examination:

The examination of Eliz: 31. May. 1692

Mercy Lewis & Mary Walcot fell in a fit quickly after the examinant came in
Mary Walcot said that this woman the examinant had pincht her & choakt this month.
Ann Putnam said she had hurt her three times.
What say you to this charge? Here are them that charge you with witchcraft
If it was the last moment I was to live, God knows I am innocent of any thing in this nature
Did not you take notice that now when you lookt upon Mercy Lewis she was struck down?
I cannot help it.
You are charged here; what doe you say?
I am innocent of any thing of this nature.
Is this the first time that ever you were accused?
Yes S'r.
Do not you know that one at Ipswitch hath accused you?
This is the first time that ever I heard of it
You say that you never heard of these folks before
Mercy Lewis at length spake & charged this woman with hurting & pinching her: And then Abigail Williams cryed she hath hurt me a great many times, a great while & she hath brought me the book.
Ann Putnam had a pin stuck in her hand
What do you say to this?
I cannot help it.
What consent have you given?
Mary Warren cryed out she was prickt
Abig: Williams cryed out that she was pincht, & great printes were seen in her arm.
Have not you seen some apparition—
No, never in all my life
Those that have confessed, they tell us they used images & pins, now tell us what you have used.
You would not have me confess that which I know not
She lookt upon Mary Warren, & said Warren violently fell down.
Look upon this maid viz: Mary Walcot, her back being towards the examinant Mary Warren & Ann Putnam said they saw this woman upon her. Susan: Sheldon saith this was the woman that carryed her yesterday to the Pond Sus: Sheldon carried to the Examinant in a fit & was well upon grasping her arm.
You said you never heard before of these people
Not before the warrant was served upon me last Sabbath day
John Indian cryed out O she bites, & fell into a grevious fit, & so carried to her in his fir & was well upon her grasping him.
What do you say to these things, they cannot come to you?
S'r. I am not able to give account of it
Cannot you tell what keeps them off from your body?
I cannot tell, I know not what it is?
That is strange that you should do these things & not be able to tell how.
This is a true account of the examination of Eliz: How taken from my characters written at the time thereof. Witness my hand

Sam. Parris.

(Reverse) Eliza. How Exam.Adjour't. June 30 92 How

(witnesses v. Elizabeth Howe)

== Indictments against Elizabeth Howe ==
These indictments are transcripts of the legal documents taken from The Salem Witchcraft Papers (3).Anno Regis et Reginae

Anno Regis et Reginae Willm et Mariae:
nunc Angliae &c: Quarto

Essex ss The Jurors for our Sovereigne Lord and Lady the King & Queen presents that Elizabeth Howe Wife of James How of Ipswich — the 29th day of May in the forth Year of the Reigne of our Sovereigne Lord and Lady William and Mary by the Grace of God [of God] of England Scottland France and Ireland King and Queen defend'rs of the faith &c: and divers other dayes and times as well before as after certaine detestable Arts called witchcraft & Sorceries wickedly & felloniously hath Used Practised and Exercised at and within the Towne ship of Salem in the County of Essex aforesaid in upon and against one: Marcy Lewis of Salem Villiage Single woman — by which said wicked Acts the said Marcy Lewis — the 29th day of May in the forth Year aboves'd: and divers other dayes & times as well before as after was and is Tortured. Afflicted: Pined Consumed & Tormented and also for sundrey other Acts of witchcraft by the Said Elizabeth Howe Committed & done before and since that Time ag't. the Peace of our Sovereigne Lord and Lady the King & Queen, and ag't the forme of the Statute in that case made and Provided (7)
Witnesses.

Mercy Lewis. Jurat
Mary Wolcott Jurat
Abigall Williams
Ann Putnam Jurat
Sam'll. Pearly & wife Jurat
Sam'll. Pearly & wife Ruth Jurat
Joseph Andrews & wife Sarah Jurat
Jno. Sherrin Jurat
Jos. Safford Jurat
francis Leane Jurat
Abraham fosters wife Lydia J[urat]
Isack Cumins Jun'r

the thirty first day of May in the forth Year of the Reigne of our Sovereigne Lord and Lady William and Mary by the Grace of God of England Scottland. France, and Ireland King and Queen defenders of the faith &c: and divers other dayes and times. as well before as after Certaine Detestable Arts called witchcraft, and Sorceries wickedly and felloniously. hath used Practised and Exercised at and within the Towneship of Salem in the County of Essex afores'd: in upon and against one Mary Wolcott of Salem Villiage Singlewoman by which said wicked arts the said Mary Walcott the 31st day of May in the forth Year as abovesaid, and divers other dayes and times as well before as after was and is Tortured Afflicted Pined Consumed wasted & Tormented and also for sundrey other Acts of witchcraft by said Elizabeth Howe Committed and Done before and since that time, ag't. the Peace. of our Sovereigne Lord & Lady the King and Queen, and against the forme of the Statute in that Case made & Provided. (7)

Mary Wolcott Jurat
Ann Putnam Jurat
Abigall Williams.
Sam'll. Pearly & wife
Ruth Jurat
Joseph Andrews & wife.
Sarah Jurat
Jno. Sherrin Jurat
Jos: Safford. Jurat.
francis Leane. Jurant
Abraham fosters wife Lydia Jurat
Isack Cumins Jun'r. Jurat

== Evidence in the court and witnesses against Howe ==
There were many different types of evidence that were used to convict a supposed witch. These were confession, supernatural attributes, the witch's teat or witch's mark (any small skin growth or abnormality found on the body of the accused), anger followed by mischief, and probably most importantly spectral evidence defined by The Witches of Early America as "the supernatural phenomena thought to occur when a vision or 'spectre' of an accused witch appeared to a witness".

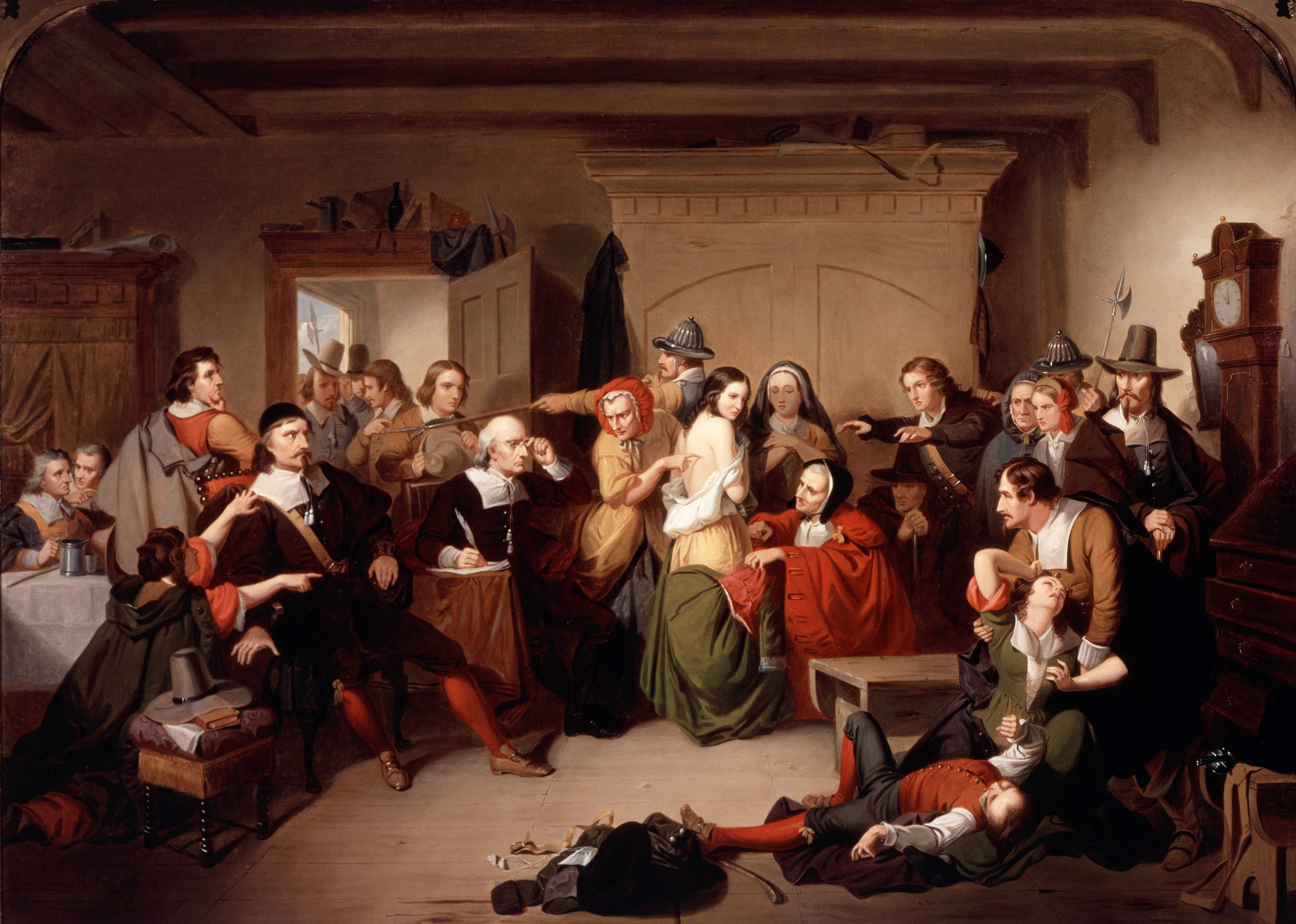
Witch examination

Anger followed by mischief is one form of evidence that was brought against Elizabeth Howe. The Perley (sometimes spelled Pearly) family, who had also accused her of afflicting their ten-year-old daughter, blamed the sudden illness of the family's cow upon her. This was due, they claimed, to the fact that they had thwarted Elizabeth Howe's chance of becoming a member of the Ipswich Church. Samuel Perley (or Pearly) stated: "the above said goode how had a mind to joyn to Ipswich Church thai being unsatisfied sent to us to bring in what we had against her and when we had decleared to them what we knew thai se cause to put a stop to her coming into the Church". Samuel went on to explain a few days afterwards his cow suddenly went mad and ran into a pond drowning herself.

Spectral evidence played a key role in the Salem Witch Trials. The Witches of Early America defines spectral evidence as, "the supernatural phenomena thought to occur when a vision or 'spectre' of an accused witch appeared to a witness". The accusation of the Perley family (also spelled Pearly) is not a direct example of when "an accused witch appeared to a witness". However, they did bring forth spectral evidence with the story of their daughter. Apparently she told her parents that when she went near fire or water, "this witch [pulled her] in".

Another accusation of anger before mischief was raised against Elizabeth Howe by her own brother-in-law. From his account we learn that she asked John Howe to go with her to "Salem farmes". He told her that had she been accused of any other thing he would go with her, but because the accusation was witchcraft he "would not for ten pounds", he continued, "If you are a witch tell me how long you have ben [sic] a witch and what mischeve you have done and then I will go with you". His report explains that she "semed to be aingry with me". John owned a sow with six small piglets. Around sunset he recounted the sow "leaped up about [three or four feet high] and [turned about] and gave one [squeak] and fell [down dead]". He went on to say that he cut off the ear of the sow and the hand he used to do this became numb and full of pain for several days after. All of this he blamed upon his sister-in-law Elizabeth How [sic].

== Witnesses on behalf of Howe ==
Having witnessed a conversation between Samuel Perley (also spelled Pearly)'s little girl and Elizabeth Howe. Reverend Phillips of Rowley was able to testify in her defense on June 3, 1692. This testimony is taken from the Salem Witchcraft Papers.

The testimony of Samuel Phillips aged about 67, minister of the word of God in Rowly, who sayth, that mr payson (minister of gods word alsoe in Rowley) and my self went, being desired, to Samuel pearly of ipswich to se their young daughter who was viseted with strang fitts & in her fitts (as her father & mother affirmed) did mention good wife How the wife of James Howe Junior of Ipswich, as if she was in the house & did afflict her: when we were in the house the child had one of her fitts but made noe mention of goodwife how; & when the fitt was over & she come to herself, goodwife How, went to the child and took her by the hand & askt her whether she had ever done her any hurt And she answered no never and if I did complain of you in my fitts I know not that I did soe: I further can affirm upon oath that young Samuel Pearly, Brother to the afflicted girle looking out of a chamber window (I and the afflicted child being without dores together) and say to his sister say goodwife Howe is a witch, say she is a witch & the child spake not a word that way, but I lookt up to the window where the youth stood & rebuked him for his boldness to stirr up his sister to accuse the said goodw: How where as she had cleared her from doing any hurt to his sister in both our hearing, & I added noo wonder that the child in har fitts did mention Goodwife Howe, when her nearest relations were soe frequent in expressing theire suspicions in the childs hearing when she was out of her fitts, that the sayd Goodwif How, was an Instrument of mischief to the child.

A colleague of Phillips, Payson of Rowley, was also present at this "encounter" between Elizabeth Howe and the Perley (also spelled Pearly)'s daughter. He added his testimony as a second witness stating, "their afflicted daughter, upon something that her mother spake to her with tartness, presently fell into one of her usuall strange fitts, during which, she made no mention(as I observed)of the above s'd How her name, or any thing relating to her some time after, the s'd how came in."

In her defense, Elizabeth Howe's father-in-law testified to her good nature. He said that she, "[set] a side humain infurmitys as [become] a Christion with Respact to [himself] as a father very dutifully & a wifife to [his] son very carfull loveing obedient and kind Considering his want of eye sight." He concluded his witness by saying, "now desiering god may guide your honours to se a difference between predigous and Consentes I rest yours to Sarve."

== Execution ==
Public execution was considered the most severe punishment of the time in Puritan Massachusetts. Convicted witches were hanged on Gallows Hill. Elizabeth Howe was hanged on July 19, 1692, along with Rebecca Nurse, Sarah Good, Sarah Wildes and Susanna Martin.

The execution methods in New England were very similar to those used in England. The condemned would ride to the execution spot with a minister. He would then elaborate on the saving grace of Jesus Christ and repentance. The minister would also preach a sermon to the crowd that had gathered to watch the execution. Historian Louis P. Masur wrote, "The ritual of execution day required that condemned prisoners demonstrate publicly that they were penitent, and the execution sermons repeatedly pounded the chord of penitence." In an ideal situation the convicted would confess to their crime, alleviating worry from the community that they were sending an unprepared soul to the next life.

== Conclusion ==
Elizabeth Howe, Rebecca Nurse, Sarah Good, Sarah Wildes and Susanna Martin were hanged on July 19, 1692, and buried in a crevice on Gallows hill.

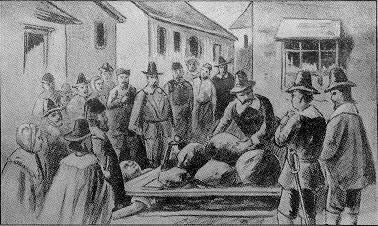
Giles Corey (image)

Nineteen people were hanged for witchcraft during the Salem witch trials, and one man, Giles Corey, was pressed to death because he refused to attest to the indictment against him.

In 1709, many were encouraged to join in a petition with Phillip English; they began with approximately twenty-one accused witches and children of the accused; although, later many others added their sentiments. Among these were the daughters of Elizabeth Howe. They requested that their good names be restored and also wanted financial compensation for their losses during the trials. It was not until 1711 that a sum of approximately £598 was distributed among the survivors.

== See also ==
- List of people of the Salem witch trials
- In Memory of Elizabeth Howe, Salem, 1692, a fashion collection inspired by the designer's genealogical relationship to Howe
