= In Memory of Elizabeth Howe, Salem, 1692 =

2008 fashion collection by Alexander McQueen

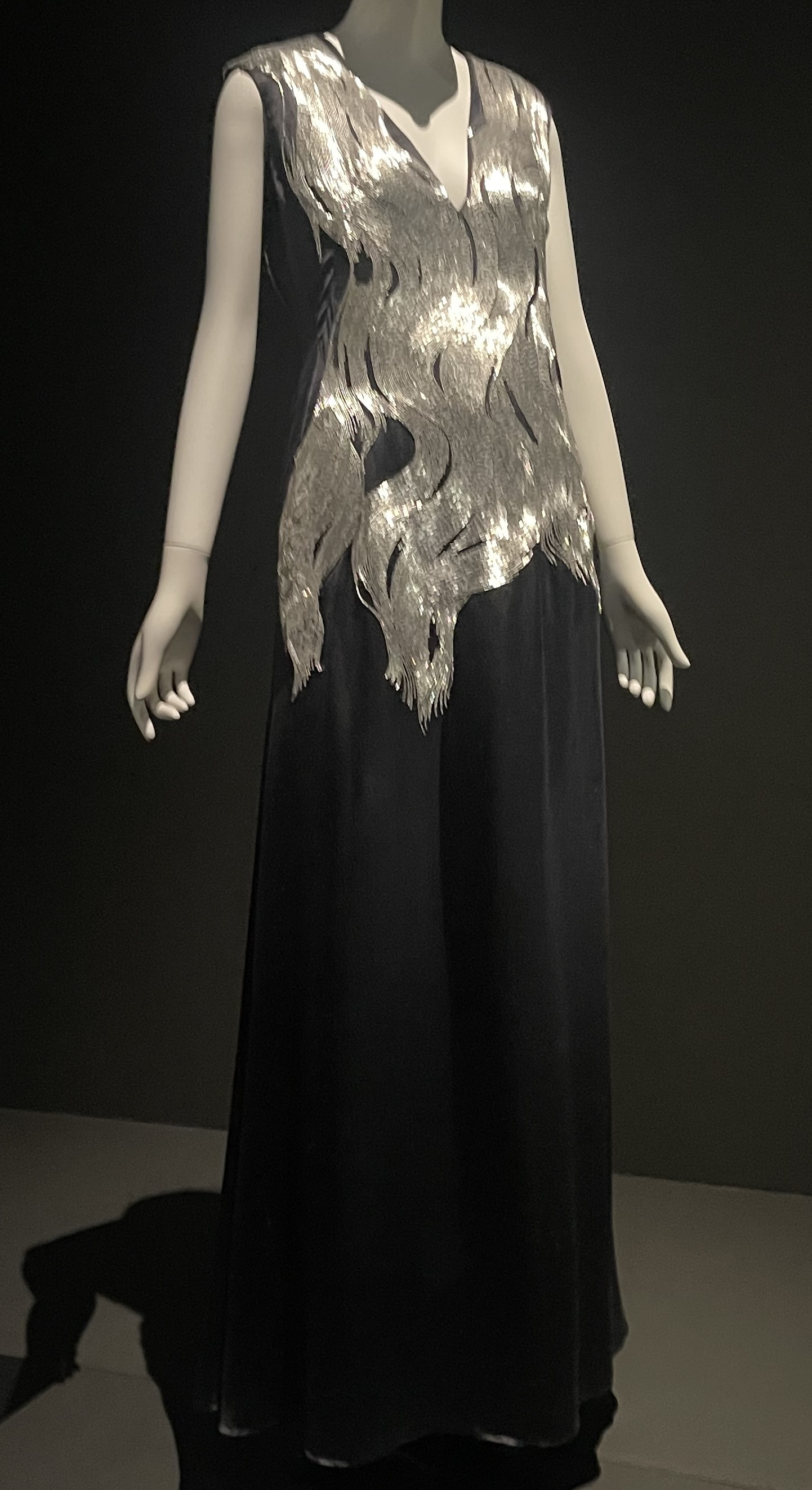
Look 43 presented at Lee Alexander McQueen: Mind, Mythos, Muse at Musée national des beaux-arts du Québec

In Memory of Elizabeth Howe, Salem, 1692 is the thirtieth collection by British fashion designer Alexander McQueen, released for the Autumn/Winter 2007 season of his eponymous fashion house. Elizabeth Howe was inspired by the Salem witch trials, and also incorporated elements from occult symbolism and the ancient Egyptian religion. McQueen was distantly related to Elizabeth Howe, one of the women hanged during the trials, and he travelled to Salem, Massachusetts, to do research for the collection. Compared to his previous two collections, which were melancholy and romantic, the narrative was noticeably more Gothic, with themes of persecution and desire. The palette was composed largely of dark shades, with jewel tones and gold for contrast.

The runway show was staged on 2 March 2007 at Le Zénith Arena in Paris during Paris Fashion Week. The collection was presented in a dimly-lit room. A 45-foot (14 m) screen in the shape of an inverted pyramid was suspended above the dark circular stage, where models walked along the lines of a red pentagram. A film directed by McQueen accompanied the show, depicting occult and macabre imagery. Forty-nine looks were presented. The most notable are a series of long dresses with beading which resembles hair, and a gold bodysuit evoking gilded Egyptian statues.

The collection received a mixed to negative reception. Reviewers complained about the staging, with a broad consensus that the dim lighting made it difficult to see the designs and the macabre theatrics had overshadowed the clothes. Some critics identified the evening gowns and moulded bodices as a highlight. It is not better remembered in retrospect. Academic analysis has focused on interpreting McQueen's narrative and references. Items from the collection have appeared in exhibitions like the retrospective Alexander McQueen: Savage Beauty.

== Background ==
British fashion designer Alexander McQueen was known for his imaginative, sometimes controversial designs, and dramatic fashion shows. Over the course of his career, which lasted from 1992 until his death in 2010, he explored a broad range of ideas and themes, particularly sexuality, death, violence, romanticism, and historicism. He learned tailoring as an apprentice on Savile Row, and dressmaking as head designer at French fashion house Givenchy. (Note: From October 1996 to October 2001, McQueen was simultaneously head designer at Givenchy and at his own label.) Although he worked in ready-to-wear – clothing produced for retail sale – his showpiece designs featured a degree of craftsmanship that verged on haute couture.

McQueen's work was highly autobiographical: he incorporated elements of his memories, feelings, and personal fixations into his designs and runway shows. He had a difficult upbringing, which led him to identify with the persecuted and the vulnerable all his life. McQueen's mother Joyce was interested in genealogy, and she passed this interest to her son, who became fascinated by his heritage. Several of his collections, including Joan (Autumn/Winter 1998) and Eye (Spring/Summer 2000), examined the persecution and oppression of women. McQueen's earlier shows Highland Rape (Autumn/Winter 1995) and The Widows of Culloden (Autumn/Winter 2006) drew on his feelings about his Scottish ancestry and English violence toward Scotland.

Variations on a hard moulded bodice appeared in a number of McQueen's collections, beginning with Banshee (Autumn/Winter 1994). For No. 13 (Spring/Summer 1999), McQueen commissioned plaster of Paris life casts of model Laura Morgan, which were used to create leather bodices. The casts were re-used for future collections, including The Overlook (Autumn/Winter 1999) and It's Only a Game (Spring/Summer 2005).

== Concept and collection ==
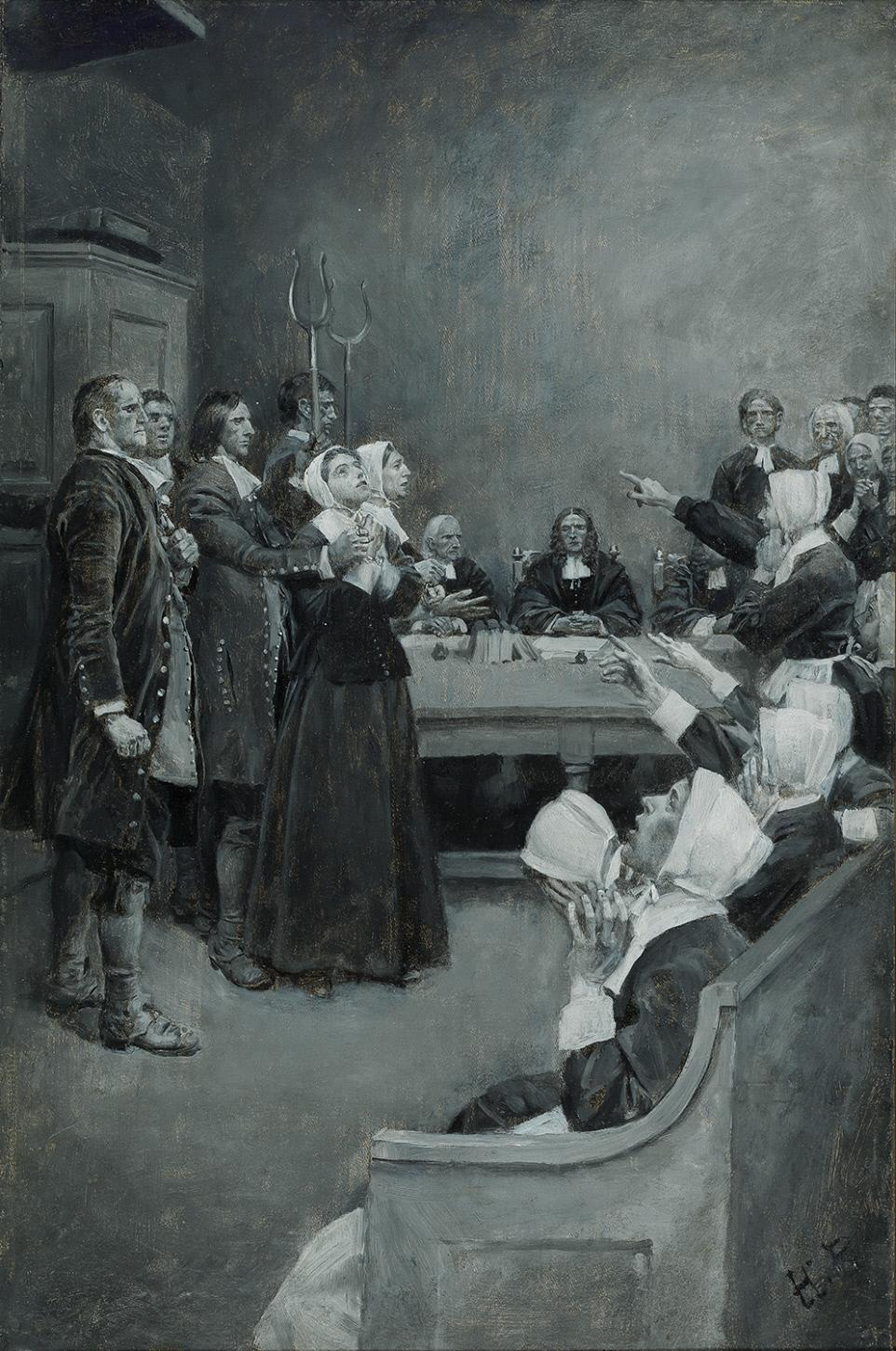
1892 painting of witch trial during the Salem witch hunts

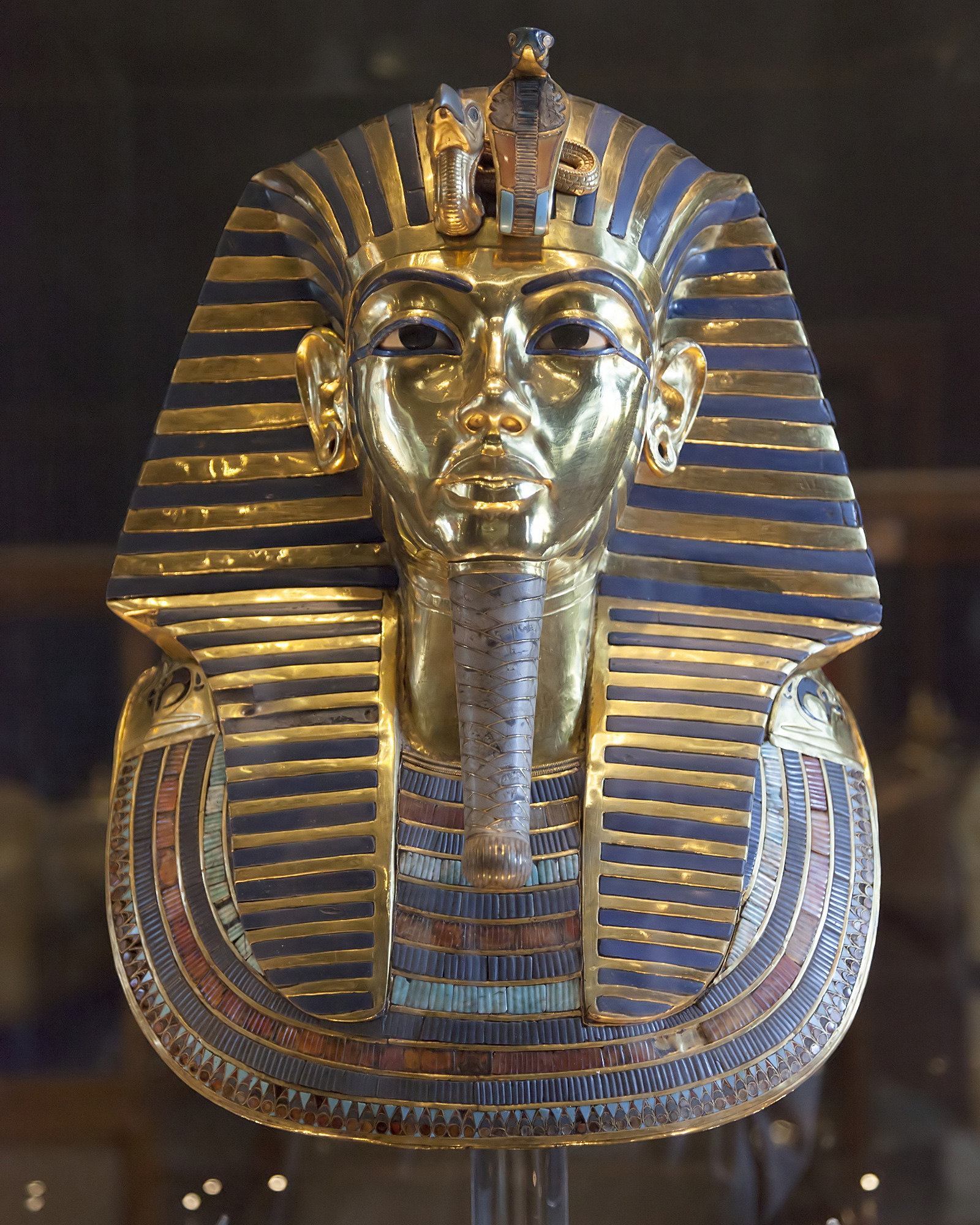
Gold funerary mask of Tutankhamun with blue glass paste stripes

In Memory of Elizabeth Howe, Salem, 1692 (Note: Some sources use the spelling "Elizabeth How".) (Autumn/Winter 2007) is the thirtieth collection McQueen designed for his eponymous fashion house. His previous two collections, Widows and Sarabande (Spring/Summer 2007), had been melancholy but softly romantic. Elizabeth Howe took a noticeably darker, more Gothic tone, with themes of persecution, revenge, and desire. The collection's primary inspiration was the Salem witch trials, a series of religiously motivated prosecutions of people accused of witchcraft in colonial Massachusetts between February 1692 and April 1693; nineteen of the accused were hanged. McQueen also drew on The Crucible, a 1953 play by Arthur Miller which dramatises the Salem events, as well as the 1996 film version. Commercial items such as sweaters and parkas accompanied showpiece items like long beaded gowns.

McQueen became interested in the trials toward the end of 2006. According to his mother's genealogy research, they were distant relatives of Elizabeth Howe, one of the women hanged. (Note: Some sources inaccurately refer to Howe as an ancestor of McQueen's. She was a distant relative on his mother's side.) That December, he took a research trip to Salem, Massachusetts, an exception from his usual reluctance to travel for work. He was accompanied by his right-hand woman Sarah Burton, (Note: Burton's official title was Head of Womenswear.) McQueen's friend Kerry Youmas, and fashion journalist Sarah Mower; Mower had been commissioned by Vogue to write a feature article about the research process for the collection. While in Salem, the group undertook research at local libraries and the Salem Witch Museum, and visited historical locations such as Howe's grave.

The overall palette was sombre, with mostly dark shades like black, brown, and maroon. For contrast, there were rich green, purple, and blue jewel tones, including in dip-dyed fox furs and iridescent greens said to resemble insect wings. Gold saw heavy use as a main colour and an accent. The collection's saturated colours would have violated the sumptuary laws in place in Salem during the time of the witch trials, because of the amount of dye required to achieve them.

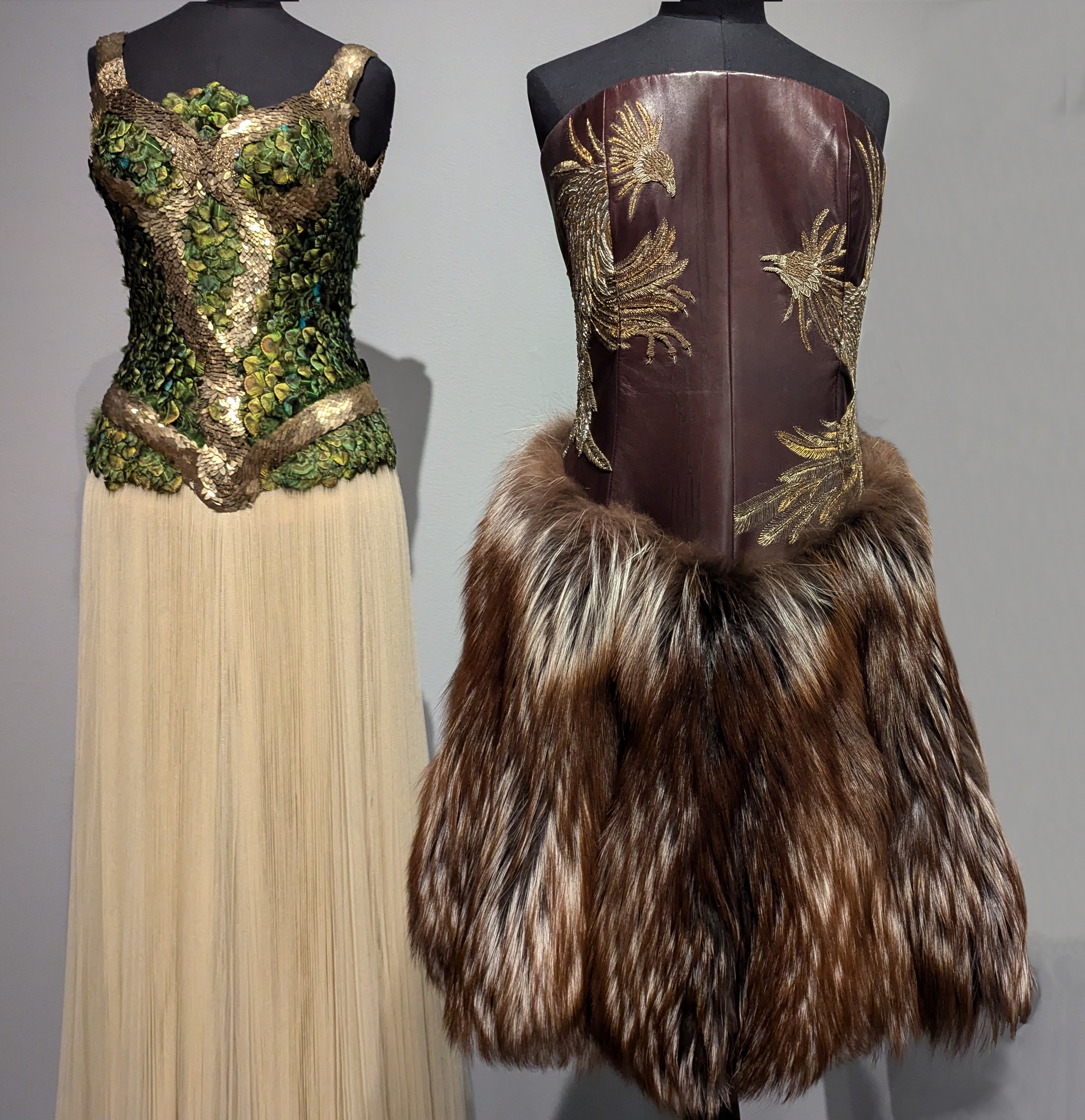
Look 19 and Look 29 pictured at Lee Alexander McQueen & Ann Ray – Rendez-Vous

Elizabeth Howe also incorporated elements from occult symbolism and the ancient Egyptian religion. Two long black dresses, Looks 43 and 44, were adorned with beading that appeared to resemble locks of hair, which can be associated with witchcraft and femininity. Jeweller Shaun Leane, a frequent McQueen collaborator, created a pair of headpieces that drew on moon goddess symbolism from neopaganism: a crescent moon and a large star, each covered with Swarovski crystals. Look 42, a sheer black dress paired with the moon headpiece, was covered in what author Karen Homer took as "pagan symbols". Critics have described a series of blue-and-gold and all-gold looks in the middle of the collection as evocative of gilded ancient Egyptian statues and sarcophagi. The patterns on some of these items resembled stylised ibis wings; the bird was sacred to the Egyptians.

Leather and other stiff materials appeared in several items. There were bustiers in brown leather and what curator Claire Wilcox described as "scarab-shaped leather carapaces", paired with thigh-high boots. Morgan's torso cast from No. 13 was used again to create moulded leather bodices, including one in chocolate-brown leather. The design extended downward past the hips and upward to cover the entire face, save the eyes. Look 45 juxtaposed hard and soft with a stiff exterior and a fuzzy inner layer.

The designs looked back to McQueen's previous collections in other ways. The hourglass silhouette found in Look 45 was a McQueen standard, heavily present in Sarabande; and wide necklines recalled similar designs from Pantheon ad Lucem (Autumn/Winter 2004). There were multiple apparent callbacks to Irere (Spring/Summer 2003). Author Katherine Gleason suggested that a gem-covered cross on Look 40 recalled that collection's religious elements, while McQueen's biographer Judith Watt identified the final four looks from Elizabeth Howe as drawing on a nude bodysuit with elaborate black patterning from Irere. McQueen had experimented with hair in Eshu (Fall/Winter 2000), which featured a coat made entirely from large loops of synthetic hair.

Other garments evoked the work of designers McQueen admired. The gown with hair-like beading reminded curator Kate Bethune of designs made by Jean Cocteau for Elsa Schiaparelli. Gleason thought that Look 17, a blue and gold cocktail dress with origami-like pointed folds, was evocative of a 1989 Issey Miyake design. Some concepts were more novel. Several items had rounded or bulging silhouettes which departed heavily from both McQueen's typical style and the fashionable norm. Some authors felt they resembled the ovum – the female egg cell.

== Runway show ==
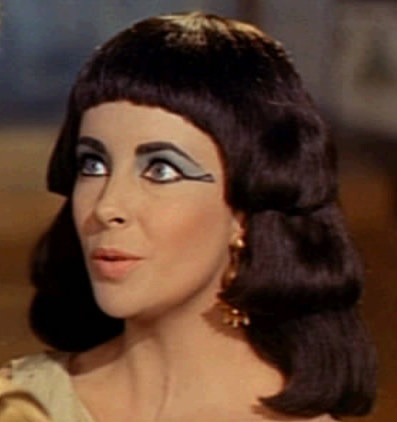
Elizabeth Taylor portraying the lead character in Cleopatra (1963)

Close-up of Magdalena Frąckowiak on the runway

Comparison of make-up looks from Cleopatra and Elizabeth Howe

The runway show was staged on 2 March 2007 at Le Zénith Arena in Paris. The invitation featured a Joel-Peter Witkin photograph called "Woman Masturbating on the Moon". Guests were provided with a copy of a genealogy chart documenting McQueen's relation to Howe. The show opened with the song "Red Tape" (1995) by Agent Provocateur. Other tracks included a hard rock cover of the Screamin' Jay Hawkins song "I Put a Spell on You" (1956).

McQueen typically worked with a consistent creative team for his shows. His longtime collaborator Katy England was responsible for overall styling; it was her last show with McQueen. Gainsbury & Whiting oversaw production. Joseph Bennett took care of set design. Eugene Souleiman styled hair, while Charlotte Tilbury handled make-up. (Note: Judith Watt reports the hairstylist as Guido Palau. Backstage photographer Robert Fairer reports the make-up artists as Terry Barber and Val Garland in collaboration with MAC Cosmetics. A contemporary Elle article quotes Souleiman and Tilbury discussing their respective work backstage.)

Styling for the collection was dramatic. McQueen was heavily involved in determining the details of the final look. During the final development phase, days before the show, he told Elle magazine he felt there was no point doing shows without elaborate hair and make-up: "We already know what we really look like in clothes. We want the fantasy." Years later, Sarah Burton recalled how McQueen's philosophy on runway styling, which downplayed models' identities in favour of emphasising the designs, was expressed in extreme fashion in Elizabeth Howe. One model was sent down the runway in a leather bodice that extended upward to cover her entire face, save the eyes.

Hair was styled in buns that were elongated behind the head. Souleiman described the look as "Alien meets Predator, a really bizarre silhouette, with a kind of Cleopatra-slash-Joan of Arc-y front". Make-up for the collection was dramatic, evoking the colourful styles worn in the 1960s. Models wore heavy matte green and blue eye shadow with thick black winged eye liner, inspired by the looks worn by Elizabeth Taylor in the 1963 film Cleopatra and the popular conception of Egyptian glamour. MAC Cosmetics later released a limited-edition "MAC for McQueen" collection featuring eye shadow inspired by the runway make-up.

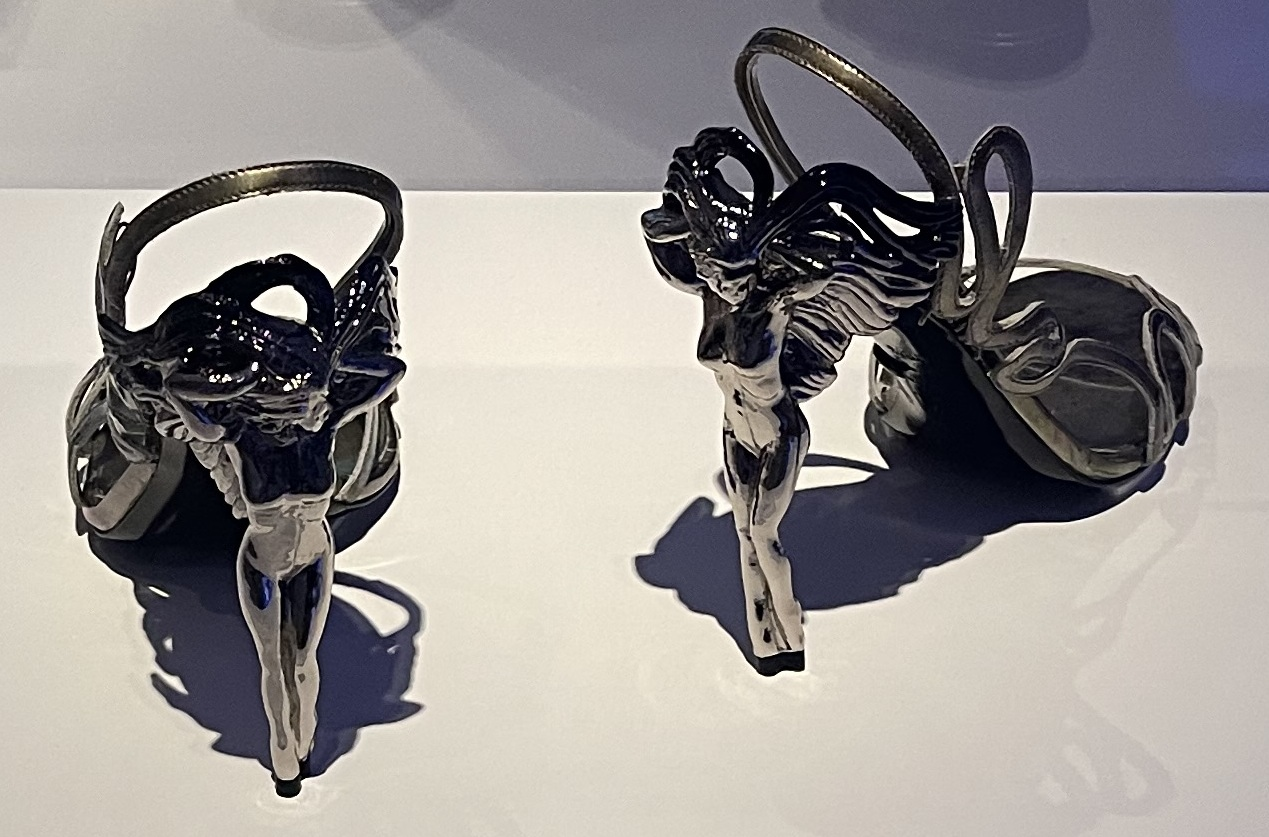
Shoes from the collection at Mind, Mythos, Muse

The collection was presented in a dimly lit room with a circular stage covered with dark gravel. A red pentagram, a symbol commonly associated with witchcraft and paganism, was laid into the rocks while a 45-foot screen in the shape of an inverted pyramid was suspended above. The show opened with the faces of three women projected on the screen, while a voice whispered "I open my heart to you, I open my spirit to you, I open my body to you." Throughout the show, a film played on the screen depicting macabre imagery of flames, blood, insects, owls, decaying human heads, and naked women. Models walked along the outline of the pentagram rather than in the traditional straight line. Author Andrew Wilson described the overall effect as reminiscent of a Satanic ritual.

Forty-nine looks were presented in total. The first series of ensembles focused on a soft look, with rounded silhouettes, padded hips, and quilted fabric. The show then moved to blue and gold Egyptian-inspired items, followed by a series of more commercial skirts, wrap jackets, and denim items, interspersed with leather bustiers. The final phase comprised mostly black or very dark dresses with various embellishments, including the long beaded gowns. The last four ensembles had elaborate patterns rendered in black beading; the closing look featured a model dusted with gold pigment.

== Reception ==
=== Contemporary ===
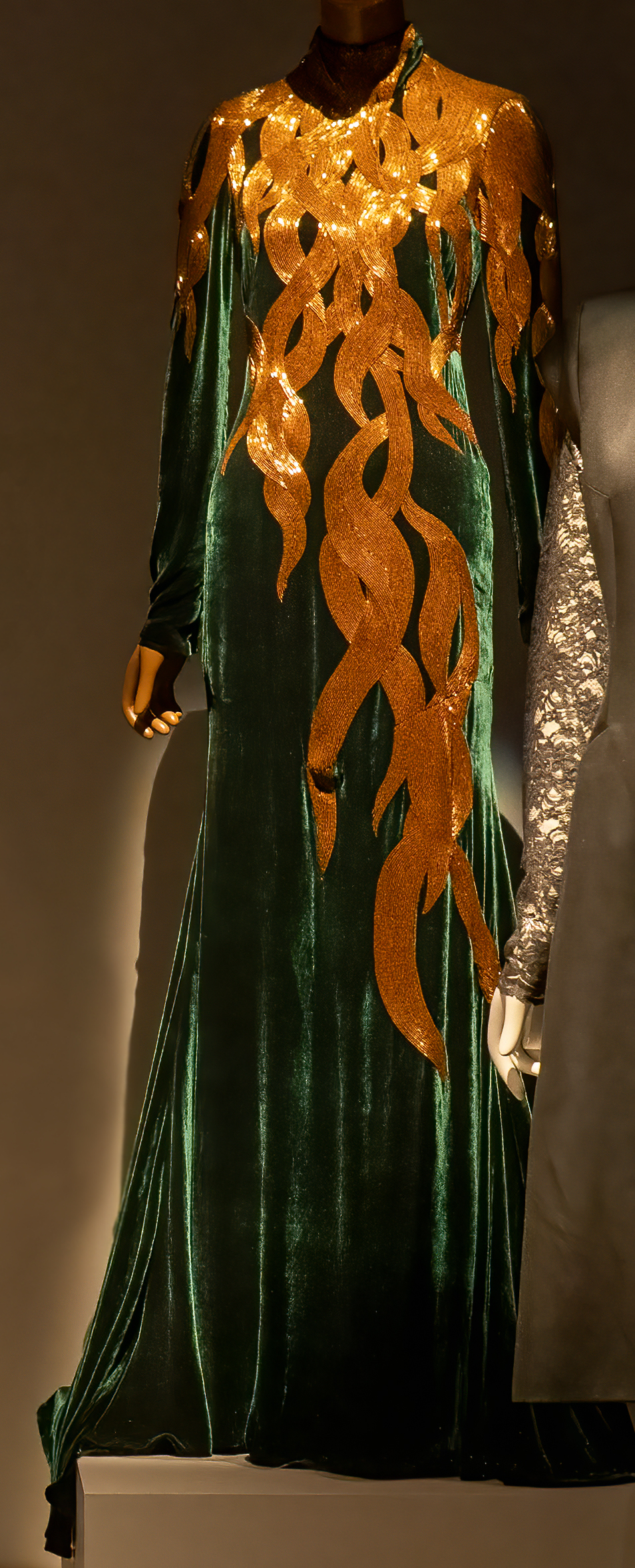
Look 44 at Dress, Dreams and Desire exhibit at The Museum at FIT, 2025

The collection received a mixed to negative reception. The show was held late at night at a venue far from the heart of Paris. Traffic was heavy, the weather was badly inclement, and the audience was forced to wait in the dark for the show to start. As a result, critics were already irritated by the time the show began, and were not inclined to judge it kindly. Many thought McQueen had put macabre theatrics over the practicalities of design and presentation. The music was loud and jarring, and it was difficult to see the designs due to the dim lighting and the distance between the audience and the stage. A few reviewers were more positive, describing the show as a challenging but intriguing mix of theatre, romance, and narrative.

The show's narrative was felt to be unacceptably dark, especially when compared to the more subdued Widows and Sarabande. McQueen's intended statement about persecution did not have the desired impact. The reviewer for Women's Wear Daily (WWD) respected the late-career creative risk, but felt that in the absence of any counterbalance to the rage, it had not paid off. Sarah Mower thought McQueen's statement about persecution had been lost in the noise, and called the show "one of the season's most deleterious cases of concept overwhelming clothes". Robin Givhan of The Washington Post thought the presentation "reeked of anger and violence", undercutting McQueen's intended theme of female empowerment. Suzy Menkes of the International Herald Tribune felt it was an unpleasant return to his aggressive early years.

The designs were polarising. Many critics appreciated the evening gowns and the moulded bodices. Curator Kate Bethune reported praise for designs that "connoted fertility and protection". Some thought there was a reasonable balance between showpieces and commercial items. Hilary Alexander, writing in The Daily Telegraph, deemed it one of McQueen's sexiest collections and highlighted the occult aesthetics. For The Times, Lisa Armstrong appreciated the historicist aspect and the face masks, which she felt made the collection "modern and menacing". Florence Evin for Le Monde highlighted the rich colour palette. Dolly Jones of British Vogue anticipated commercial success for a green satin parka with a fur hood.

Others were more critical. There was a broad consensus that the gory visuals overwhelmed the designs, especially the more restrained or elegant items. Other reviewers felt there was little of interest for a typical retail customer. Some dismissed the evening gowns as uninspired. Givhan criticised the hard bodices and tight corsets, suggesting the models looked as though they were suffering. Booth Moore of the Los Angeles Times felt these items, in addition to the headpieces and masks, verged on "bad heavy metal video territory". Derick Chetty of the Toronto Star argued that the denim garments did not fit the dramatic concept. Eric Wilson of The New York Times compared an outfit with a green tunic sweater to Muppet character Kermit the Frog.

=== Aftermath and retrospective ===
Alexander McQueen's equally elaborate, Salem witch trial-inspired experience [...] fell resoundingly flat. He has produced some of fashion's great spectacles but here sartorial creativity seemed to have been sacrificed on the altar of shock creativity a la rebellious teenager.

— Vanessa Friedman, Financial Times review

Miles Socha of WWD reported that Mower and McQueen had fallen out over the show. Mower was displeased by the show's logistical difficulties including backstage access, and McQueen was unhappy with her negative review as well as his belief that she had been rude to his staff. Vogue cancelled the feature article that Mower had been planning for a fall issue, but told WWD that it was part of the typical editorial process and not to do with any dispute.

In a 2008 article, Bridget Foley of W described Elizabeth Howe as a "study in vitriol expressed via fashion". She reported that McQueen himself by then considered the execution of the collection, in her words, "at least partly a mistake". In her 2012 biography of McQueen, Watt explicitly argued against Foley's remark, saying that McQueen was responding to the "outrage of what had happened to innocent women". She felt the rounded silhouettes were an interesting development of McQueen's effort to create designs that did not focus on the waist, as Western fashion traditionally had.

Archie Reed, McQueen's on-again, off-again boyfriend, described the collection in a 2013 interview as "the start of [McQueen] saying goodbye"; McQueen committed suicide in February 2010. Writing that April, essayist Ingrid Sischy recalled the many complaints about the show and reflected that, in light of the suicide, long wait times and high prices seemed less important.

== Analysis ==
While fashion journalists found the show's visuals macabre, later authors have provided other interpretations. Claire Wilcox assessed them as a "contemplation of the powers of feminine enchantment". Textile curators Clarissa M. Esguerra and Michaela Hansen suggested that the image of three women which opened the show represented three women from the Salem trials who are portrayed in The Crucible – Elizabeth Proctor, Abigail Williams, and Ann Putnam.

Some theorists place Elizabeth Howe in the context of fashion history. Textile theorist Petra Krpan noted that McQueen was following a long tradition of making Cleopatra – both the actual woman and the cinematic portrayal – an inspiration for fashion and art. Academic Kristen J. Sollée positioned it as one of many collections that draw on what she termed "witch fashion": styles which invoke the dark feminine power associated with the folkloric figure of the witch. Isobel Van Dyke in Dazed magazine recalled it as one of the "witchiest" collections in fashion history.

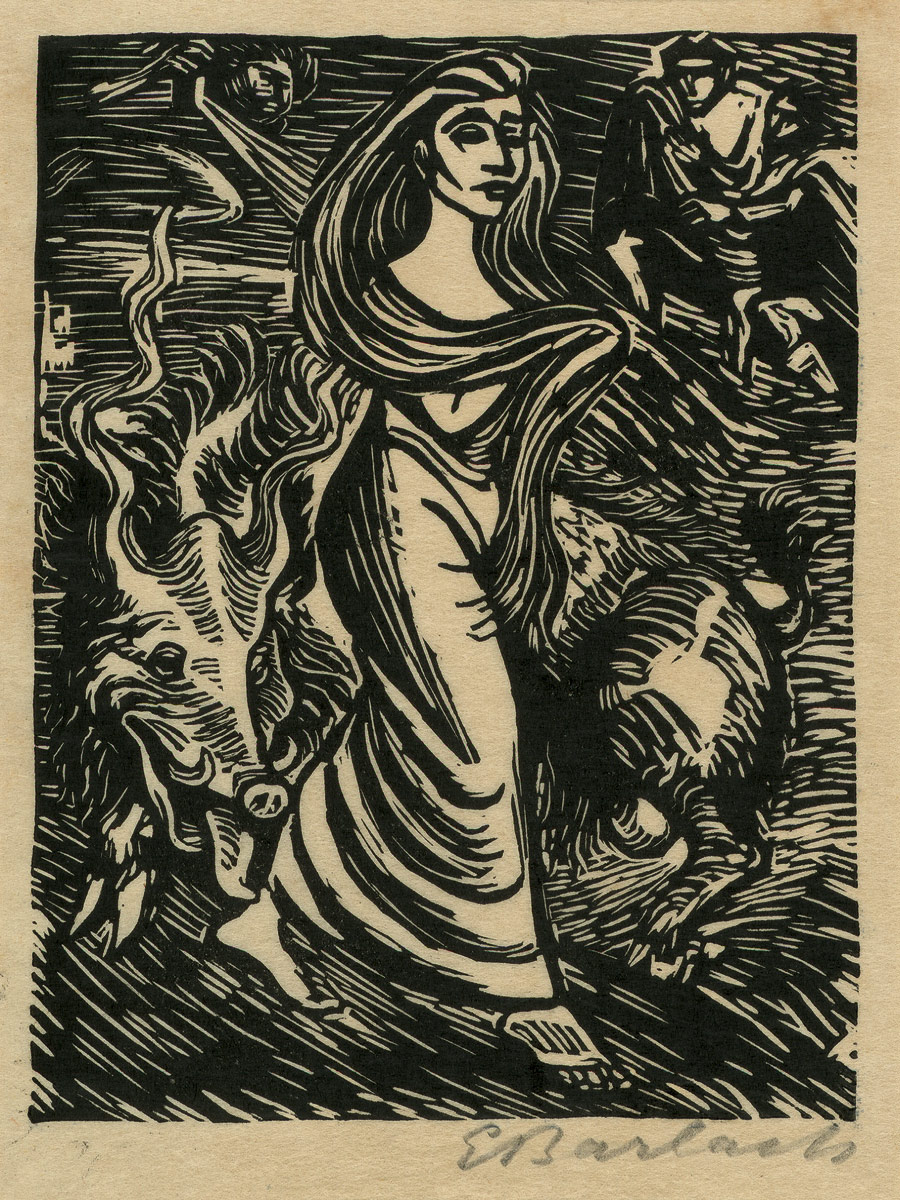
Lilith, Adam's First Wife, woodblock print by Ernst Barlach, 1922

Knox felt that Look 20, the gold bodysuit, epitomised the collection's Egyptian elements. She suggested it resembled a "golden statuette of some ancient divinity" or perhaps a stereotypical gilded Egyptian sarcophagus. Gleason thought it "glowed like the sun", which she noted was revered in both ancient Egyptian and pagan practice. Bethune read Leane's headpieces as pagan symbols, while Wilson called them a "reminder of nocturnal sorcery".

Authors have compared the collection to Widows in terms of its basis in McQueen's ancestry. Katherine Gleason considered it another instance of McQueen exploring the concept of persecution and stigmatisation. Caroline Spooner interpreted the show's aesthetic as using occult symbolism to present the "persecuted witches" as "exotic femmes fatales" instead of as victims.

Esguerra and Hansen interpreted the dresses with beading resembling hair as symbolising freedom, feminine power, and temptation. For them, the image was a subversion of the practice of shaving or cutting the hair of suspected witches; conversely they also felt it resembled fire, invoking the European practice of burning witches at the stake. (Note: They note that this was a European practice; in America, witches were executed by hanging.) They compared these dresses to a series of woodblock prints by German expressionist Ernst Barlach, in which hair and witchcraft are visually linked. One depicts the mythological figure of Lilith. Traditionally portrayed as demonic, modern re-imaginings often consider her a "symbol of feminine strength"; Esguerra and Hansen felt McQueen was making a similar re-interpretation of witches with Elizabeth Howe. Although she acknowledged that McQueen was probably not thinking along these lines, Colleen Hill felt these dresses evoked the long-haired fairy tale character Rapunzel.

Bethune found meaning in the leather items, especially the bustiers and moulded bodice. She felt the bustiers indicated "defiance against persecution", while the full-length bodice conversely "hinted at the suppression of religious freedoms". Fashion theorist Catherine Evans described the leather bodice as an "object with agency" – a thing that, by its design, makes something happen in a particular way. In this case, the bodice's length and rigidity forces the wearer to walk in a restricted way. Author Ana Honigman described it as a way of reframing victimhood into a warrior state, with elements of "high-end BDSM kink"; her mouth both "silenced and ominously missing".

== Legacy ==
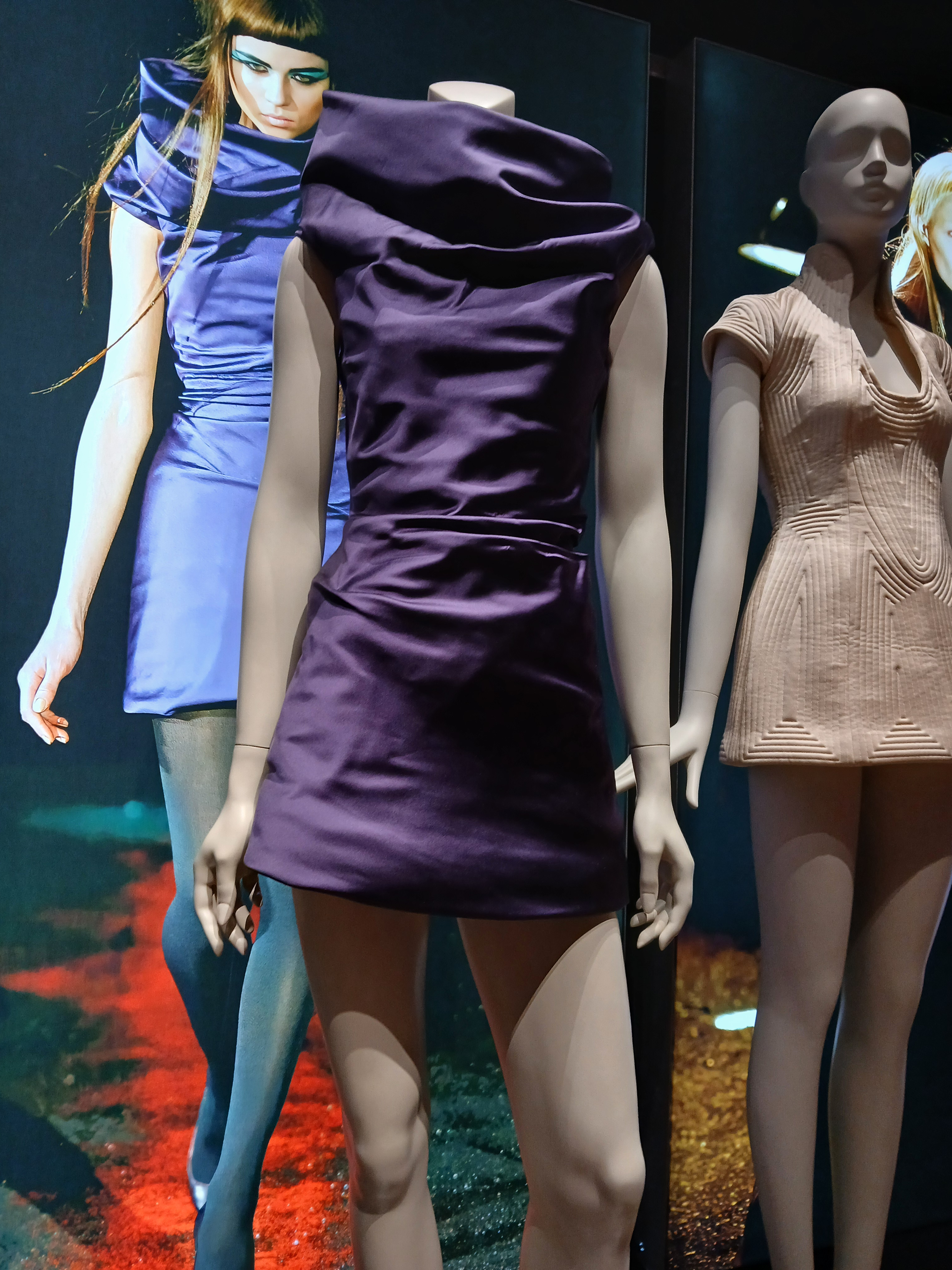
Two looks from Elizabeth Howe at the exhibit accompanying the House of McQueen play, 2025

Several items from Elizabeth Howe, particularly the dresses beaded to resemble hair, have appeared in museum exhibitions. Three items from Elizabeth Howe appeared in the 2011 exhibition Alexander McQueen: Savage Beauty, originally at the Metropolitan Museum of Art: the gold bodysuit from Look 20, the leather face-covering bodice from Look 22, and a handbag made from silver-plated metal and brown leather.

The Museum at FIT owns a copy of Look 44, a bronze-beaded green gown, which has appeared in several of their exhibits, including Fairy Tale Fashion (2016) and Dress, Dreams, and Desire (2025). The Peabody Essex Museum of Salem owns a copy of Look 45, another of the beaded evening gowns; it was the centrepiece of their 2021 exhibition The Salem Witch Trials: Reckoning and Reclaiming.

The 2022 exhibition Lee Alexander McQueen: Mind, Mythos, Muse, originally at the Los Angeles County Museum of Art, featured several items from Elizabeth Howe. There were two black dresses with silver beading: Look 43 as presented on the runway as well as a variant of Look 44. There were also two pairs of shoes and two pairs of boots. The National Gallery of Victoria owns copies of a gold quilted coat from Look 9, the gold beaded dress from Look 18, and the black velvet dress from Look 45; these appeared in their staging of Mind, Mythos, Muse.

Look 18, a long gold sequined gown, has made two red carpet appearances, although it is not clear if it was the same dress or two identical copies. Cameron Diaz wore the gold dress from Look 18 to the Tokyo premiere of Shrek the Third in May 2007. It was auctioned in 2010 at Bonhams, and again in December 2024 at Sotheby's, where it sold for $114,000. Amal Clooney wore the look to the King's Trust 50th Anniversary Celebration in May 2026.

Fashion dealer Steven Philip auctioned his collection in 2023, including a number of archival McQueen pieces. A pair of gold snakeskin heels with dragonfly detailing, produced for Elizabeth Howe, sold for £1,000. According to the auction description, they were based on Dragonfly Woman, a brooch by René Lalique c. 1897, but were never released commercially. (Note: The auction description page incorrectly lists the collection as The Widows of Culloden, but gives the year for Elizabeth Howe.) The auctioned heels were acquired by Alexander McQueen archivist John Matheson.

== Bibliography ==
- Bolton, Andrew (2011). Alexander McQueen: Savage Beauty. New York City: Metropolitan Museum of Art. ISBN 978-1-58839-412-5. OCLC 687693871.
- Esguerra, Clarissa M.; Hansen, Michaela (2022). Lee Alexander McQueen: Mind, Mythos, Muse. New York City: Delmonico Books. ISBN 978-1-63681-018-8. OCLC 1289986708.
- Fairer, Robert; Wilcox, Claire (2016). Alexander McQueen: Unseen. New Haven, Connecticut: Yale University Press. ISBN 978-0-300-22267-8. OCLC 946216643.
- Gleason, Katherine (2012). Alexander McQueen: Evolution. New York City: Race Point Publishing. ISBN 978-1-61058-837-9. OCLC 783147416.
- Hill, Colleen (2016). Fairy Tale Fashion. New Haven: Yale University Press. ISBN 978-0-300-21802-2. OCLC 920017513.
- Homer, Karen (2023). Little Book of Alexander McQueen: The Story of the Iconic Brand. London: Welbeck Publishing Group. ISBN 978-1-80279-270-6. OCLC 1378624107.
- Honigman, Ana Finel (2021). What Alexander McQueen Can Teach You About Fashion. London: Frances Lincoln. ISBN 978-0-7112-5906-5. OCLC 1445054493.
- Knox, Kristin (2010). Alexander McQueen: Genius of a Generation. London: A&C Black. ISBN 978-1-4081-3223-4. OCLC 794296806.
- Krpan, Petra (2022). "Fashioning the Cinematic Screen: Body Transmediality, Appearance, and the 'Event'". In Paić, Žarko (ed.). Fashion Theory and the Visual Semiotics of the Body. Newcastle Upon Tyne: Cambridge Scholars Publishing. pp. 169–198. ISBN 978-1-5275-8583-6. OCLC 1369666736.
- Mora, Juliana Luna; Berry, Jess (2 September 2022). "Creative Direction Succession in Luxury Fashion: The Illusion of Immortality at Chanel and Alexander McQueen". Luxury. 9 (2–3): 117–140. doi:10.1080/20511817.2022.2194039. ISSN 2051-1817.
- Sischy, Ingrid (2018). "A Man of Darkness and Dreams". Nothing Is Lost: Selected Essays. New York City: Alfred A. Knopf. ISBN 978-1-5247-3203-5. OCLC 1065537852.
- Sollée, Kristen J. (2022). "Fashioning a Glamour: Magical Embodiment in Contemporary Witchcraft". In Busch, Otto Von; Viau, Jeanine (eds.). Silhouettes of the Soul: Meditations on Fashion, Religion, and Subjectivity. London: Bloomsbury Visual Arts. pp. 176–187. ISBN 978-1-350-17992-9. OCLC 1261306442.
- Steele, Valerie (2008). Gothic: Dark Glamour. New Haven, Connecticut: Yale University Press. ISBN 978-0-300-13694-4. OCLC 216936076.
- Thomas, Dana (2015). Gods and Kings: The Rise and Fall of Alexander McQueen and John Galliano. New York City: Penguin Publishing. ISBN 978-1-101-61795-3. OCLC 951153602.
- Watt, Judith (2012). Alexander McQueen: The Life and the Legacy. New York City: Harper Design. ISBN 978-1-84796-085-6. OCLC 892706946.
- Wilcox, Claire, ed. (2015). Alexander McQueen. New York City: Abrams Books. ISBN 978-1-4197-1723-9. OCLC 891618596.
  - Bethune, Kate. "Encyclopedia of Collections". In Wilcox (2015), pp. 303–326.
  - Evans, Caroline. "Modelling McQueen: Hard Grace". In Wilcox (2015), pp. 189–201.
  - Spooner, Catherine. "A Gothic Mind". In Wilcox (2015), pp. 141–158.
- Wilson, Andrew (2015). Alexander McQueen: Blood Beneath the Skin. New York City: Simon and Schuster. ISBN 978-1-4767-7674-3. OCLC 1310585849.
