= Let Down (Paris Jackson song) =

2020 Paris Jackson song

Single by Paris Jackson

from the album Wilted
- Released: October 30, 2020
- Recorded: 2020
- Label: Republic
- Songwriter: Paris Jackson
- Producer: Andy Hull

Music video
- "Let Down" on YouTube

"Let Down", stylized as "let down", is the debut single and first published song recorded by American singer-songwriter Paris Jackson. The song was written by Jackson and produced by Manchester Orchestra's Andy Hull. It was released on October 30, 2020 by Republic Records as the lead single from her debut album Wilted.

The track has received positive reviews from critics, including AllMusic and The Guardian, where critic Luke Holland listed it as one of the songs of the week for being a "dreamy, faintly sinister yet wholly beautiful mood-ballad is about as assured a debut single as any artist could ever hope for".
