= Eye (Alexander McQueen collection) =

2000 fashion collection by Alexander McQueen

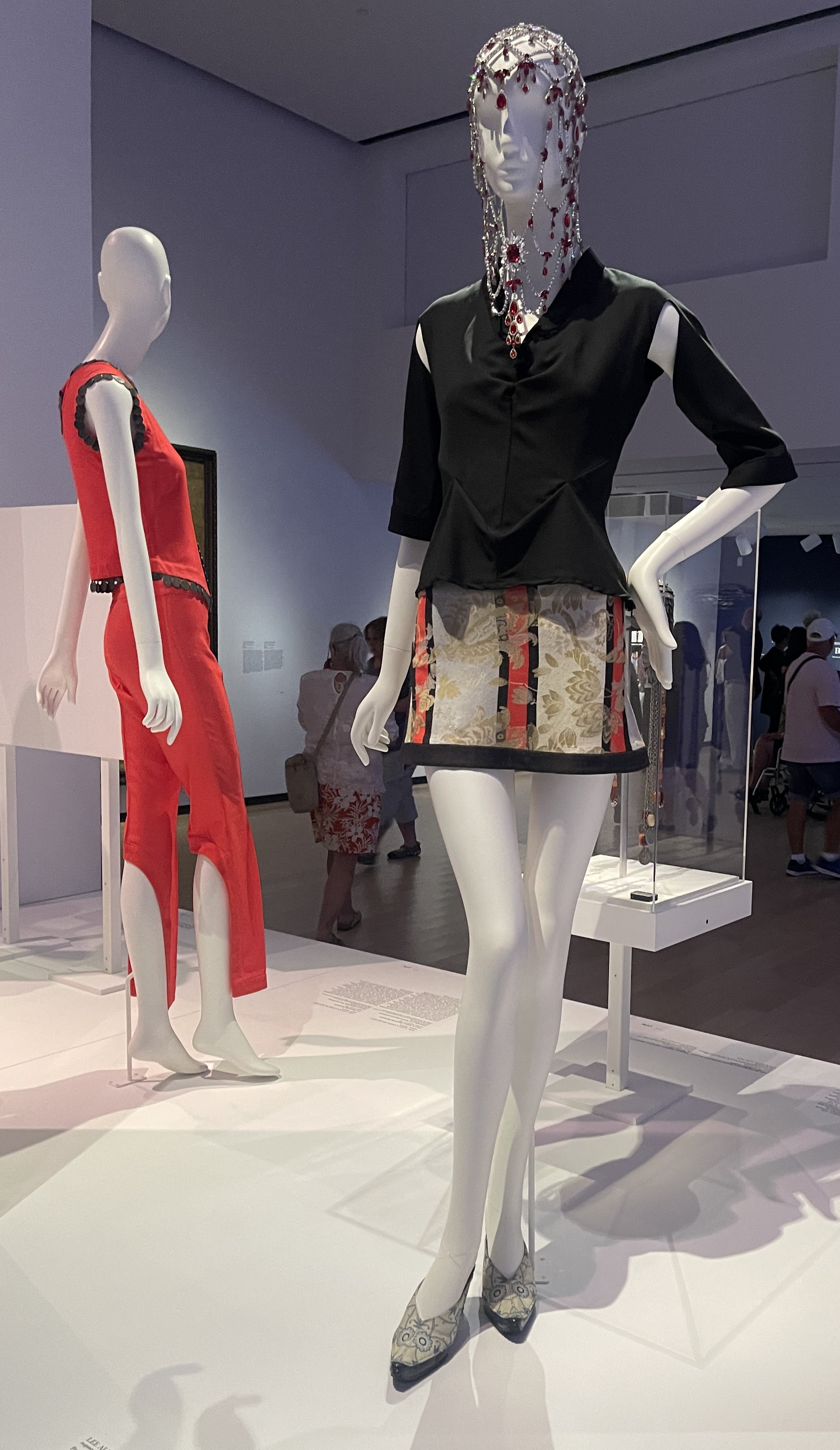
Two ensembles from Eye as presented at the exhibition Lee Alexander McQueen: Mind, Mythos, Muse (2023 staging). The headpiece in the front ensemble is a 2021 creation by Michael Schmidt.

Eye is the fifteenth collection by British fashion designer Alexander McQueen, released for the Spring/Summer 2000 season of his eponymous fashion house. It was inspired by the culture of the Middle East, particularly Islamic clothing, as well as the oppression of women in Islamic culture and their resistance to it. The collection crossed traditional Middle Eastern garments with elements drawn from Western fashion such as sportswear and fetishwear. Jeweller and frequent McQueen collaborator Shaun Leane provided the collection's best-known design: a yashmak made from chainmail.

The runway show for Eye was staged at Pier 94 on 16 September 1999, during New York Fashion Week. In the days leading up to the runway show, Hurricane Floyd was threatening New York City, and although numerous other designers cancelled shows, McQueen decided to go ahead with Eye. Despite the weather, more than 1,000 guests attended. The show was presented on a runway flooded with several inches of water, dyed black to resemble oil. Sixty-eight looks were presented in the main show, after which a bed of nails rose up from the water on the floor for the show's finale. Strobe lighting played while acrobats dressed in robes descended from the ceiling suspended from wires. When McQueen walked out for his final bow, he dropped his trousers to display boxer shorts styled to look like the American flag.

Critical response to Eye was mixed. While some reviewers enjoyed the theatrical approach, others found that it overwhelmed the clothing. Many critics found that the designs lacked innovation. The frock coats and dresses were consistently deemed the strongest part of the collection. Critical analysis has typically interpreted Eye as a statement about the contrast between the sexual and political values of the Western world and the Middle East. Accessories from Eye appeared at both stagings of the retrospective exhibition Alexander McQueen: Savage Beauty, and clothing from the collection appeared in the 2022 exhibition Lee Alexander McQueen: Mind, Mythos, Muse.

== Background ==
British fashion designer Alexander McQueen was known throughout his nearly twenty-year career, spanning 1992–2010, for his imaginative, sometimes controversial designs. Over the course of his career, which lasted from 1992 until his death in 2010, he explored a broad range of ideas and themes, particularly sexuality, death, violence, romanticism, and historicism. His fashion shows were theatrical to the point of verging on performance art. As a British designer, McQueen presented at London Fashion Week for much of his career, although he had reprised his early shows Banshee (Autumn/Winter 1994) and Dante (Autumn/Winter 1996) in New York City at the behest of fashion promoter Derek Anderson.

McQueen drew inspiration for his work from a broad range of sources, including history, world religions, art, and his own life. He often used his work to explore themes of female victimisation, resistance, survival, and empowerment, although his aggressive, sexualised designs sometimes drew accusations of misogyny. He examined religious ideas throughout his career: religious motivations for warfare in Dante (Autumn/Winter 1996); martyrdom in Joan (Autumn/Winter 1998), and religious persecution in In Memory of Elizabeth Howe, Salem, 1692 (Autumn/Winter 2007). He often played with notions of clothing as armour and vice versa.

== Concept and creative process ==
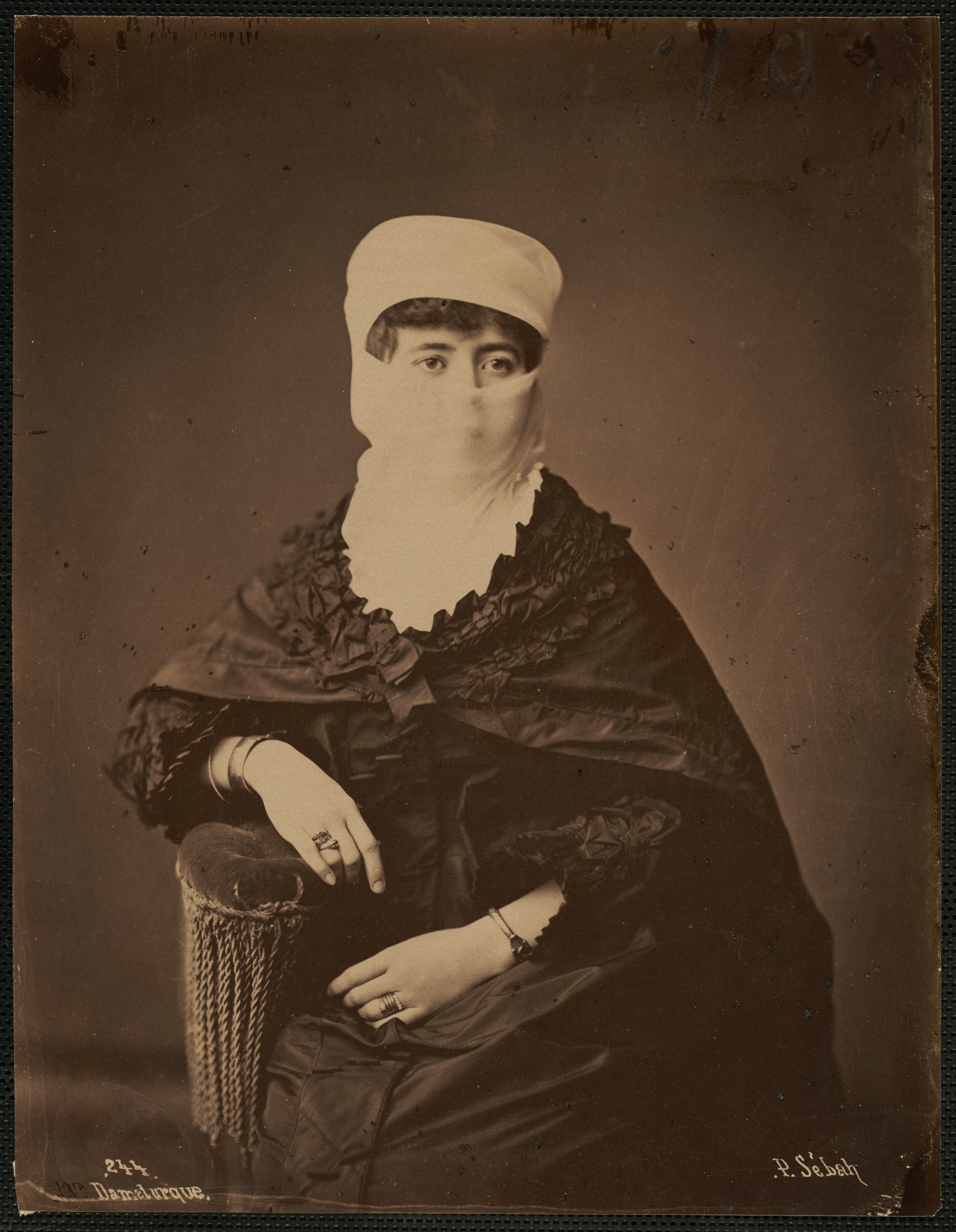
Turkish woman wearing a yashmak, by Pascal Sébah, c. 1857–1888

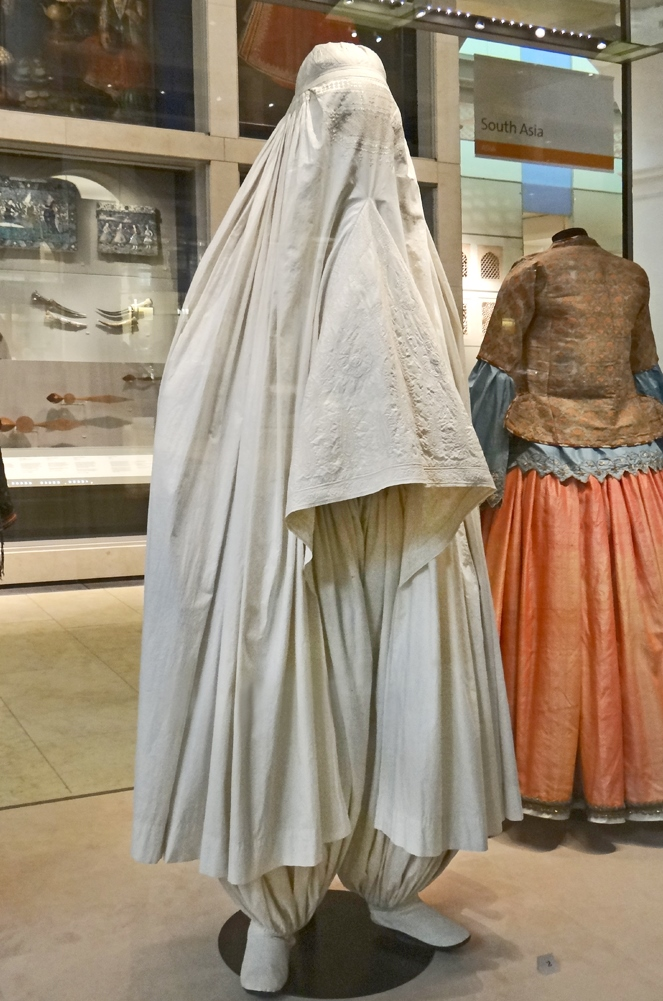
White cotton burqa with trousers, c. 1850, Victoria and Albert Museum

Eye (Spring/Summer 2000) was the fifteenth collection by British designer Alexander McQueen for his eponymous fashion house. Inspired by Turkish music McQueen heard in a taxi as well as the London Arab community, the collection explored the culture of the Middle East, particularly Islamic clothing. McQueen stated that he wished to examine the oppression of women in Islamic culture and their resistance to it.

To this end, the collection took traditional Middle Eastern and Islamic garments such as harem pants, baggy trousers fitted to the ankle; Islamic veils including the yashmak and niqāb; and the burqa, which fully covers the body and the face, and infused them with elements drawn from Western fashion styles such as sportswear and fetishwear. There were also frock coats and low-rise trousers with keyhole cutouts or scooped hems. Fetishwear concepts included face masks, body-conscious silhouettes, and leather harnesses. Sportswear was presented in the form of football jerseys bearing red crescent moons, and boxing shorts with McQueen's name in faux-Arabic script.

The collection's primary palette was red, black, and white, with metallic and embroidered elements. As was typical for McQueen, tailored items featured heavily, including coats and suits. There were also a number of draped dresses in lightweight jersey. Many items were made from brocade fabric and embroidered leather. Some items had prints resembling traditional Islamic art. The designs were cut to either conceal the body, in the Middle Eastern tradition, or reveal it, in a more Western manner. Garments were decorated with sewn-on coins, bells, and ribbons, reminiscent of belly dancing costumes. Accessories included headdresses made from coins, provided by milliner and frequent McQueen collaborator Philip Treacy. Pieces using diamonds were created by winners of an international jewellery competition.

Another longtime associate, jeweller Shaun Leane, created a yashmak made to look like chainmail, consisting of aluminium plates inset with red Swarovski crystal cabochons. According to Leane, McQueen showed him an antique belt made of filigree metalwork, set with red jewels, which Leane has variously recalled as Ottoman or Moghul, and asked him to produce something inspired by the belt which covered the entire torso and head. That was the extent of the creative brief: McQueen trusted Leane to produce something suitable, and McQueen did not see the finished item until three days before the show. The nose and eyebrow pieces for the yashmak were hand-carved by sculptor Annika Hellgren.

== Runway show ==
=== Move to New York City ===
There are an awful lot of American buyers who don't leave America let alone come to London. As a PR activity it'll do him no harm at all. From that point of view he's waving the flag for Britain. Having said that, clearly it's a shame not to have him in London.

— Simon Ward of the British Fashion Council, regarding McQueen's decision to show in New York

Eye was the first show McQueen had premiered outside of London. The decision was somewhat controversial in the British press, as McQueen's departure left London Fashion Week without one of its largest-drawing names. Lisa Armstrong at The Times of London speculated that McQueen might have been feeling spiteful toward the British Fashion Council, as he believed they had "never properly recognised his part in transforming British fashion over the past few years".

McQueen stated the move to New York was a business decision intended to showcase the Alexander McQueen brand to fashion industry personnel who did not attend London Fashion Week. He viewed this as a step toward developing the brand internationally, and was clear from the outset that he intended to return to England the following season. (Note: McQueen spoke to the Evening Standard backstage before the show, and commented "Fuck 'em," when asked if he thought American designers would be jealous of his show, continuing on to say that he was not planning on returning to New York in any case. Judith Watt and Dana Thomas quote these comments in their respective books as if they had been made after the show because McQueen was unhappy with the show's mixed reception.) The move resulted in his show being nearly a week and a half earlier than it would have been in London, prompting a rush for his employees to ensure the collection was ready in time.

=== Production details ===
Chainmail yashmak made by Shaun Leane, 2017 replica, held at the Metropolitan Museum of Art in New York City

The show was staged in a Pier 94 warehouse at 9:00 p.m. on 16 September 1999, during New York Fashion Week. McQueen had initially requested permission to stage the runway show for Eye on the Brooklyn Bridge in New York City, but the New York City Police Department declined for safety reasons. In the days leading up to the runway show, Hurricane Floyd was threatening New York, prompting closure of schools and businesses. Several other designers cancelled shows, but McQueen decided to go ahead with Eye. Announcing McQueen's decision not to cancel, his publicist, Pierre Rougier, reportedly claimed that the storm "will add atmosphere". Some joked that McQueen had arranged for the hurricane to coincide with his show for the effect. Jeanne Beker of the Ottawa Citizen speculated that he had enjoyed the opportunity to inconvenience "snooty" industry figures. Despite the weather, more than 1,000 guests attended, including several major fashion industry figures: Anna Wintour of Vogue, Kim Hastreiter of Paper, Katherine Betts of Harper's Bazaar, Hal Rubenstein of InStyle, and Patrick J. McCarthy, editorial director of Fairchild Publications.

The show was unusually expensive. Estimates of the budget varied widely; pre-show rumours projected that it would cost anywhere from £500,000 (US$800,000) to £1 million (US$1.62 million). McQueen told The Times in January 2000 that it had cost roughly £460,000 (US$750,000), while Harper's Bazaar reported in December 1999 that the show had cost £500,000 (US$800,000). Sponsor American Express, in their third year as McQueen's backer, contributed approximately £600,000 (US$970,000) to the show's budget. De Beers contributed an unspecified amount of funding, and lent a 1,220-diamond necklace and a 407-diamond pin for the runway show. These items were reportedly worth £1.24 million (US$2 million). Other backers included Onward Kashiyama, Swarovski and MAC Cosmetics.

McQueen typically worked with a consistent creative team for his shows. Joseph Bennett returned to handle set design. Overall styling was handled by Katy England, while Gainsbury & Whiting oversaw production. Hair and make-up were handled by Guido Palau and Val Garland, respectively.

=== Catwalk presentation ===
Models walked down a 100-foot (30-metre) catwalk filled with several inches of water, dyed black to resemble crude oil, a major Middle Eastern resource. McQueen had previously used liquid runways in Bellmer La Poupée (Spring/Summer 1997) and Untitled (Spring/Summer 1998). The primary make-up look was heavy black eyeliner. The models had their skin darkened with fake tan lotion. Many of the models were styled with headdresses which covered their whole face except their eyes. Others wore black wigs.

Sixty-eight looks were presented in the main show, with an additional nine looks presented during the finale. The show's soundtrack was described by Alex Kuczynski at The New York Times as "ominous disco"; it also included drums and sounds of screaming. The show opened with a black frock coat with heavy silver embroidery, worn with only black underpants beneath. Look 2 combined a black face covering with a black tailored trouser suit, a classic McQueen ensemble. The chainmail yashmak was presented in Look 13, styled with red and silver underpants. For Look 15, Gisele Bündchen wore a bodysuit covered with metallic paillettes and an embroidered headdress. McQueen referenced the burqa in Look 22, a black robe which concealed the face but was cut short in the front, revealing embellished black underwear.

For the show's finale, a bed of nails rose up from the water on the floor. Strobe lighting played while acrobats dressed in robes resembling burqas descended from the ceiling suspended from wires, floating, gyrating, and dancing. Following this, the lights came back up and the models took their final turn. Finally, "Can You Handle It" by Sharon Redd played while McQueen walked out for his final bow in blue jeans. At the top of the runway, he dropped his pants to display boxer shorts styled to look like the American flag. The show reportedly received a standing ovation.

== Reception ==
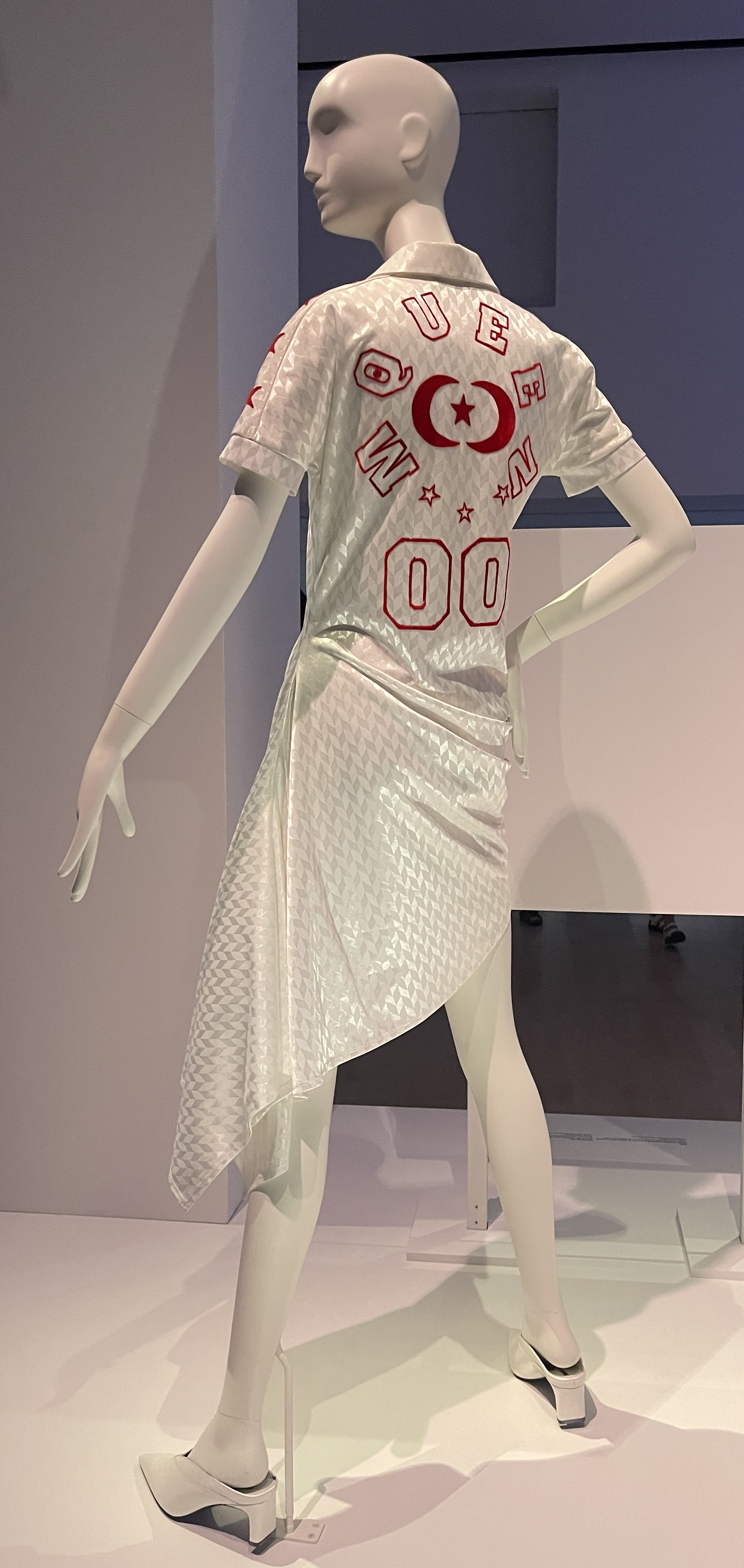
Sportswear-inspired ensemble

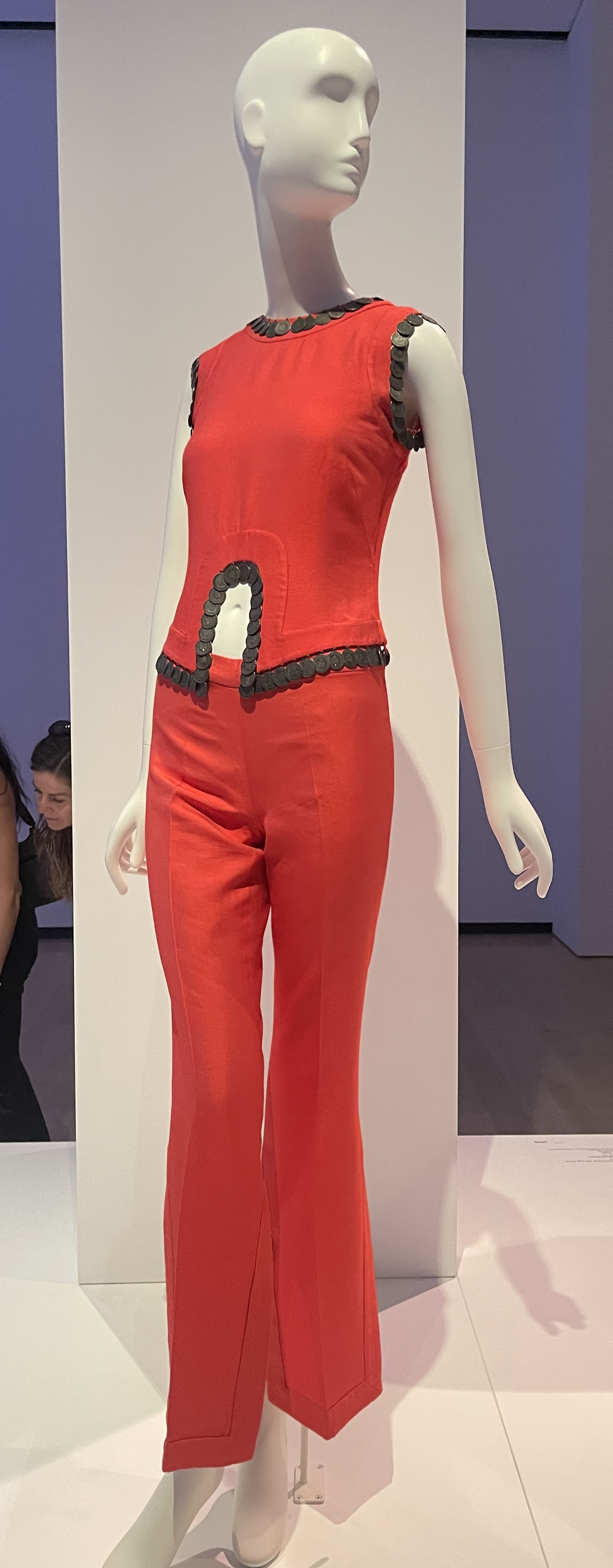
Ensemble with coin details

Outfits from Eye presented at Lee Alexander McQueen: Mind, Mythos, Muse (2023 staging)

Eye drew a varied reception from contemporary critics, and retrospectives differ in their assessment of the critical consensus. Author Andrew Wilson reported that the show earned "rave reviews", albeit more for the performance than for the clothes. In contrast, author Katherine Gleason and curator Kate Bethune each reported that reception was mixed, with Gleason writing that critics felt McQueen had "overdone the theatrics".

=== Presentation ===
A number of reviewers regarded the clothing and show as an overall success. Rebecca Lowthorpe at The Independent called Eye "the highlight of the week" and predicted that it would draw the attention that McQueen was looking for. Michael Quintanilla of the Los Angeles Times wrote that with Eye, "The bad boy did good." Fiona McIntosh, also at The Independent, said that McQueen's theatrical presentation had "managed to upstage Hurricane Floyd".

Lisa Lenoir of the Chicago Sun-Times called it "fashion meets theater". For The New York Times, Cathy Horyn called Eye "a great show, as circus goes", describing it as "art for fashion's sake". Libby Callaway of the New York Post agreed that the show mostly existed for the performance rather than for the fashion, but in a positive way, saying "Let's see Ralph [Lauren] or Donna [Karan] pull that off." Beker, in an article that contended that "fashion is pretty much over", took the finale as a visual metaphor for "ris[ing] above the dangerous inanity of the scene".

On the other hand, many reviewers felt the theatrical presentation had eclipsed the clothing it was intended to display. Several compared the show to a circus. Hilary Alexander at The Daily Telegraph called the show a "war on the senses". The staff writer at Women's Wear Daily (WWD) and Robin Givhan of The Washington Post remarked on the irony of staging a fashion show that involved purposely dragging expensive high-end clothing through water. Marisa Fox of the Chicago Tribune could not decide whether it was "poetic justice" that models had to walk through water during a hurricane or "merely a sensationalist gimmick." Colin McDowell, writing for The Sunday Times, dismissed Eye as a retread of things McQueen had done before. WWD ultimately concluded that they would have preferred to see "more fashion innovation" and less bombast. Similarly, Givhan wrote that McQueen had created not fashion but "a collection of costumes for a fascinating theatrical event".

Suzy Menkes, writing for the International Herald Tribune, gave "high marks for showmanship" but wrote that McQueen had "missed the magical fusion of function and fantasy" that characterised his earlier shows. Writing for The Detroit News, Nicola Volta Avery said that "McQueen pushed it up and over a scary edge". Lowthorpe felt the seizure-like movement of some of the dancers in the finale "had a nasty pointlessness to it", while Givhan found these movements disturbingly like "death throes". McDowell called the finale a "sinister and dreary" attempt to distract from the "mediocre" clothes.

Several reviewers commented on McQueen's stunt at the final bow. Horyn took it as an affectionate gesture, while Lowthorpe regarded it as affectionate but defiant. Lowthorpe thought the gesture might shock the American audience more than the disturbing finale. Fox was not sure whether Americans would appreciate the gesture but noted that it had guaranteed him publicity. Walton Scott of The Atlanta Journal-Constitution felt it indicated that he had "undoubtedly come to conquer". McDowell described it as a "cheap stunt" and said he could not imagine other designers needing to resort to such tactics. Alexander took it to mean that McQueen was suggesting the show was "all in fun".

=== Clothing ===
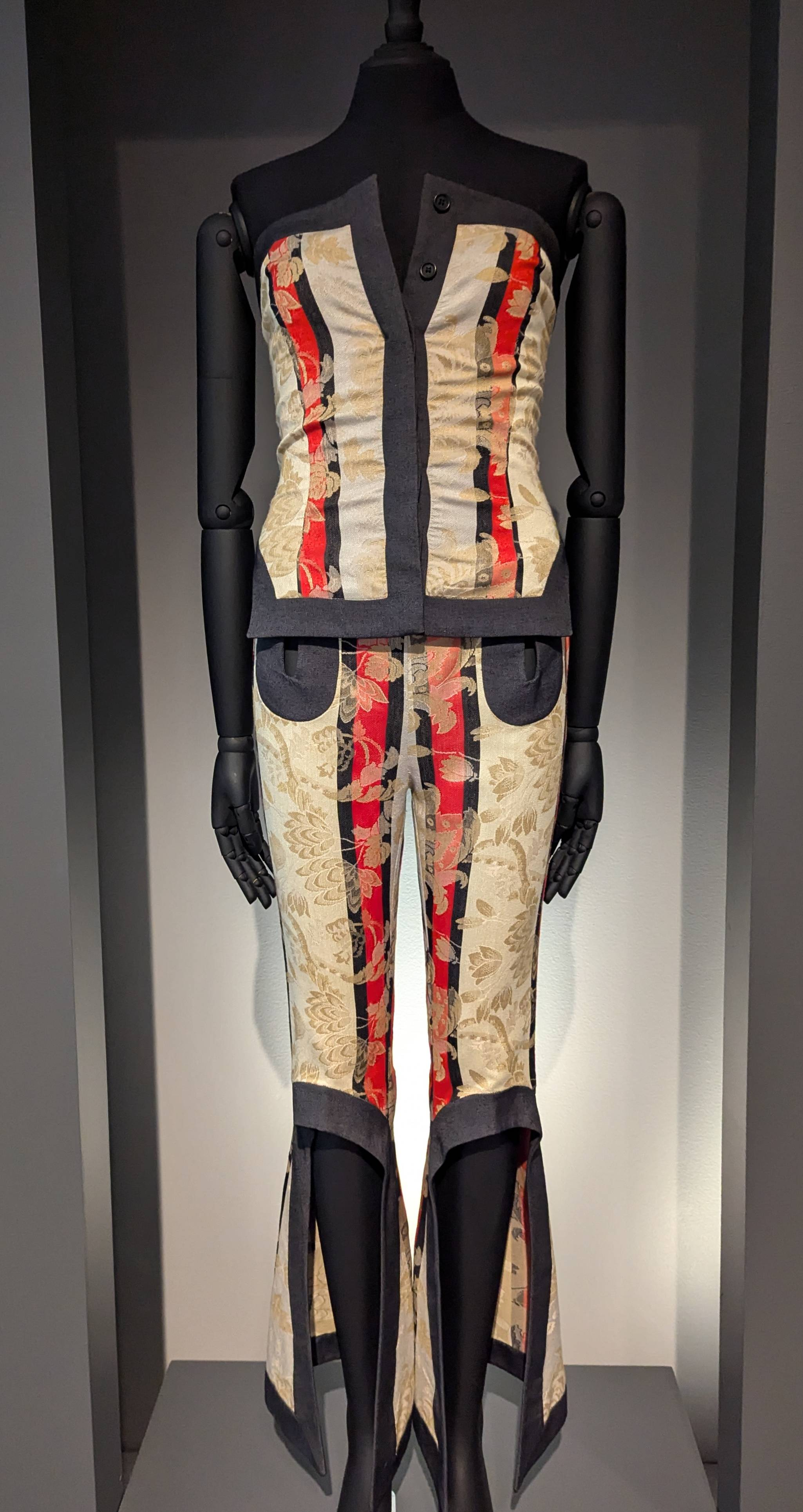
Bottoms from Look 6 paired with matching top not from runway, presented at Lee Alexander McQueen & Ann Ray - Rendez-Vous (2024)

Most reviewers highlighted the frock coats and dresses as the strongest part of Eye. Quintanilla felt that most of the clothes were "pure fantasy" but found the coats and dresses to be "standout pieces". Lisa Armstrong suggested these concepts could be "easily interpreted into store-ready versions" and called the collection overall a "tailoring coup". WWD found the dresses and coats "highlighted the designer's brashness as much as his technical skill". Both Givhan and Menkes appreciated these more commercial pieces, but felt that the more dramatic garments in the collection overwhelmed them. Callaway highlighted the dresses and pantsuits as her favourites. Laura Craik of The Guardian complimented the "witty" sportswear items, which Avery said provided a "hint of Americana". Lenoir highlighted the costumes worn in the finale, saying that they "might not be Academy Award night material, but they rose above anything else seen on the runway".

Not every reviewer was impressed with the designs. Horyn found the clothing less impactful than the runway show, remarking that "the clothes didn't break new ground" but that one had to respect McQueen's vision nonetheless. John Davidson for The Herald of Glasgow was ambivalent, saying that, although the clothing featured "clever cutting and magical decoration", it lacked McQueen's usual "finesse". Armstrong worried that McQueen's interest in increasing sales in the United States might lead him to undercut his creativity in pursuit of commercial gains. Scott found that the runway items "defied description, if not reasoning" but noted that McQueen's retail clothing was usually "more realistically wearable". Alexander appreciated the "precision cutting and elaborate detail", and felt that the loose harem-style trousers and tops "showed his softer side". However, she was strongly opposed to the fetishwear, calling it "grotesque and unnecessary".

Some critics questioned the commercial viability of the designs for Eye, particularly of the fetishwear shown on the runway. Jean Fraser of the Edmonton Journal enjoyed the performance but wrote of the designs: "As fashion that might actually sell, it's dubious." Mimi Spencer of the Evening Standard sarcastically said that "leather restraining hoods are not top of my shopping list for spring". Similarly, David Graham of the Toronto Star remarked that "there was very little to wear to the office".

== Analysis ==
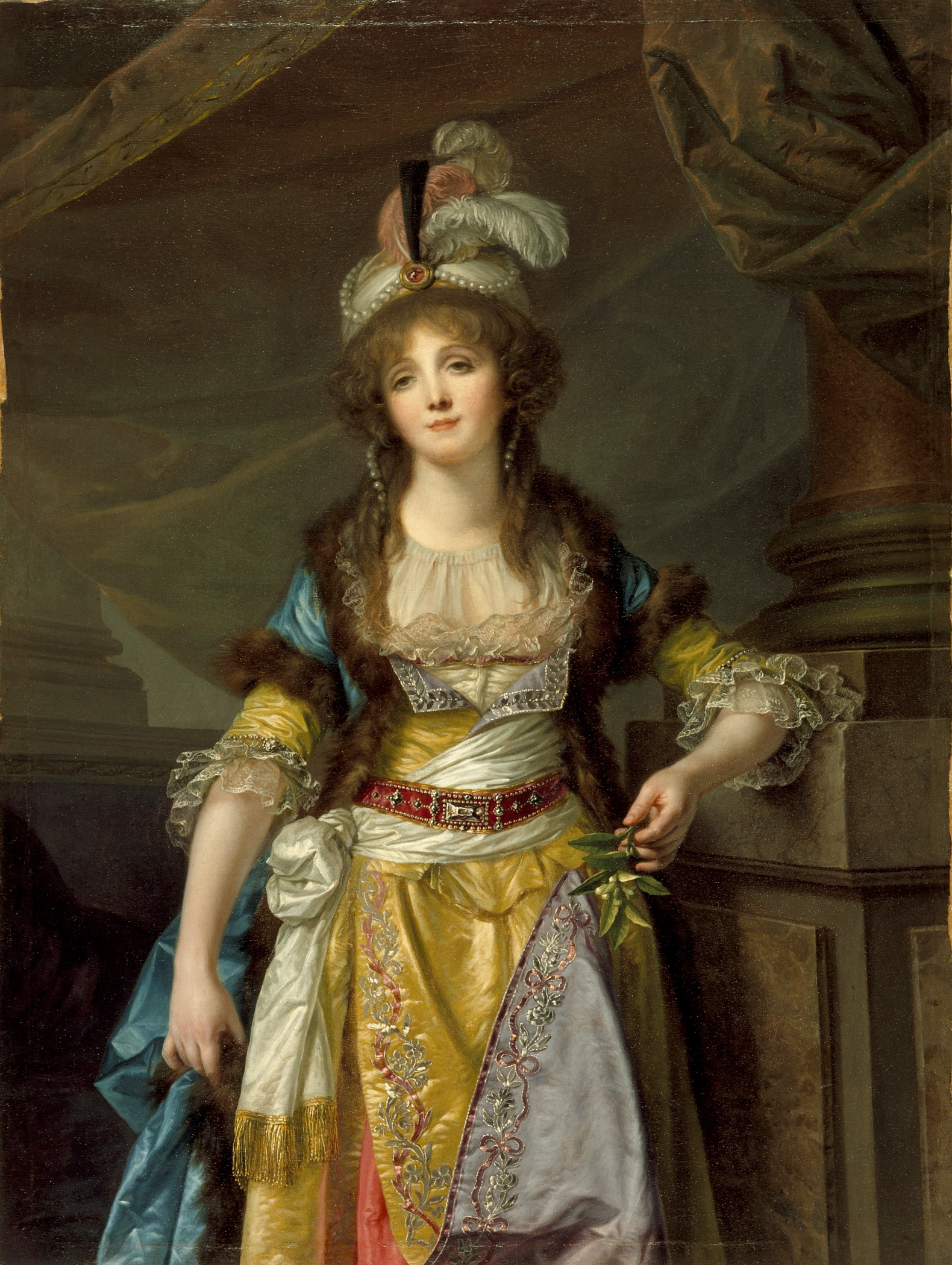
Portrait of a Lady in Turkish Fancy Dress by Jean-Baptiste Greuze (c. 1790); the painting is an example of the fashion for turquerie

Critics have typically interpreted Eye as a statement about the contrast between the values of the Western world and the Middle East. Writing in retrospect, authors Judith Watt and Andrew Wilson both regarded Eye as a commentary on contemporary American foreign policy in the Middle East and the resulting cultural conflict. Others felt it was an exploration of the way Islamic and Western cultures choose to conceal or reveal the female figure, respectively. Kate Bethune wrote that the appearance of traditional-looking tunic tops cut unusually high to reveal the midriff were a "comment on the concealment of the Middle Eastern female body", while the breast-exposing fetish harnesses "attested to Western liberalization".

Most contemporary reviews were unconvinced by McQueen's attempt at social commentary. Givhan's review called it a "tormented and often muddled commentary" on female sexuality. WWD dismissed the collection's narrative as "the defiant self-indulgence of a major talent intent on leaving his audience talking". Speaking of the outfits that concealed the face but exposed the nipples and buttocks, Armstrong wrote: "In every McQueen collection, there's always an element that makes you wonder if he likes women at all." Alexander had similar thoughts, saying "There are times when McQueen reveals more than we need to know about his attitude to women." Fox asked if he was making a point about Islamic oppression or women or "merely going for the jugular?" Conversely, Holly Hanson of the Detroit Free Press argued that McQueen had backed up the shock value of Eye with "an intriguing point of view".

Author Ana Finel Honigman wrote that the collection's sexualised niqāb designs "carried the poisonous sting of cultural appropriation and desecration". She compared Eye with Between (Spring/Summer 1998), a collection by Turkish Cypriot designer Hussein Chalayan which similarly explored women, clothing, and sexuality in Islam, but "from an insider's perspective".

Textile curators Clarissa M. Esguerra and Michaela Hansen criticised the way McQueen mixed and matched ideas from various cultures into one "sensational vision", calling Eye a form of turquerie, an 18th-century European trend for a romanticised version of Turkish culture and fashion. They found that despite McQueen's goal of exploring religious repression of women, the collection "offered no clear commentary on women's agency", in part because the pieces actually sold in stores lacked the religiously provocative stylings included in the runway show. Esguerra and Hansen compared Eye to McQueen's Scottish-inspired Autumn/Winter 2006 collection, The Widows of Culloden, because of the way both collections drew from history. They argued that Widows succeeded where Eye failed because of McQueen's "intimate knowledge of and personal attachment to" the subject matter. They also contrasted Eye with Between, finding that Eye lacked "cultural sensitivity" in comparison to Chalayan's personal experience with the culture he was examining.

Critics have noted the ambiguity of Shaun Leane's chainmail yashmak. It can be viewed as both armour and jewellery; Leane described it as "jewelry covering the body to create this formidable structure". It combines a reference to the armour worn by Christian soldiers of the Crusades – a series of religious wars in which Christians fought against Muslims – but also the traditional dress of Muslim women. Curator Soyoung Lee wrote that the yashmak "signals mystery and forbiddance" by concealing the wearer's body and face yet possesses a "sensuous fluidity" in its movements.

== Legacy ==
The original chainmail yashmak by Shaun Leane was reworked for McQueen's The Horn of Plenty (Autumn/Winter 2009), where it was presented as part of Look 42, underneath a silk gown printed with milk snakes in red, black, and white. The Victoria and Albert Museum (the V&A) in London owns a replica version of the yashmak made in 2015. The Metropolitan Museum of Art (The Met) in New York City commissioned a replica of their own in 2017, which stands in the museum's permanent collection.

Leane's yashmak was one of several items that appeared in the October 2001 Fashion in Motion event at the V&A, which served as a retrospective of their creative relationship. The yashmak also appeared at the 2006 exhibition Love and War: The Weaponized Woman at The Museum at FIT. Three of the coin headdresses from Eye appeared in the exhibition Alexander McQueen: Savage Beauty, originally staged in 2011 at The Met. The V&A's replica yashmak appeared in that museum's 2015 version of Savage Beauty. The Met's replica appeared in their 2018 exhibition Jewelry: The Body Transformed. Several ensembles and coin headdresses appeared in the 2022 exhibition Lee Alexander McQueen: Mind, Mythos, Muse.

When early McQueen employee Ruti Danan auctioned her personal archive in 2020, a pair of embroidered trousers from Eye sold for a reported US$1,875.

The Alexander McQueen brand returned to New York Fashion Week for Autumn/Winter 2022; it was their first show there since Eye.

== Bibliography ==
- Bethune, Kate (2015). "Encyclopedia of Collections". In Wilcox, Claire (ed.). Alexander McQueen. New York City: Abrams Books. pp. 303–326. ISBN 978-1-4197-1723-9. OCLC 891618596.
- Bolton, Andrew (2011). Alexander McQueen: Savage Beauty. New York City: Metropolitan Museum of Art. ISBN 978-1-58839-412-5. OCLC 687693871.
- Esguerra, Clarissa M.; Hansen, Michaela (2022). Lee Alexander McQueen: Mind, Mythos, Muse. New York City: Delmonico Books. ISBN 978-1-63681-018-8. OCLC 1289986708.
- Fairer, Robert; Wilcox, Claire (2016). Alexander McQueen: Unseen. New Haven, Connecticut: Yale University Press. ISBN 978-0-300-22267-8. OCLC 946216643.
- Gleason, Katherine (2012). Alexander McQueen: Evolution. New York City: Race Point Publishing. ISBN 978-1-61058-837-9. OCLC 783147416.
- Honigman, Ana Finel (2021). What Alexander McQueen Can Teach You About Fashion. London: Frances Lincoln. ISBN 978-0-7112-5906-5.
- Lee, Soyoung (2018). "The Alluring Body: Jewelry on the Edge". In Holcomb, Melanie (ed.). Jewelry: The Body Transformed. New York City: Metropolitan Museum of Art. pp. 189–198. ISBN 978-1-58839-650-1.
- Mora, Juliana Luna; Berry, Jess (2 September 2022). "Creative Direction Succession in Luxury Fashion: The Illusion of Immortality at Chanel and Alexander McQueen". Luxury. 9 (2–3): 117–140. doi:10.1080/20511817.2022.2194039. ISSN 2051-1817.
- Thomas, Dana (2015). Gods and Kings: The Rise and Fall of Alexander McQueen and John Galliano. New York City: Penguin Publishing. ISBN 978-1-101-61795-3. OCLC 951153602.
- How was it made? Remaking of the McQueen Yashmak. Victoria and Albert Museum. 22 May 2015 – via YouTube.
- Watt, Judith (2012). Alexander McQueen: The Life and the Legacy. New York City: Harper Design. ISBN 978-1-84796-085-6. OCLC 892706946.
- Wilson, Andrew (2015). Alexander McQueen: Blood Beneath the Skin. New York City: Simon and Schuster. ISBN 978-1-4767-7674-3. OCLC 1310585849.
