= No. 13 Finale =

Performance artwork by Alexander McQueen

No. 13 Finale is a performance artwork by fashion designer Alexander McQueen, presented at the end of the Spring/Summer 1999 show for McQueen's eponymous fashion house. It consists of model Shalom Harlow wearing a white dress, standing on a rotating platform on the show's catwalk and being spray-painted by robots.

The piece is regarded as a highlight of McQueen's career and one of the most iconic moments in fashion history.

== No. 13 ==
No. 13 (Spring/Summer 1999) is McQueen's thirteenth collection. It was inspired by the Arts and Crafts movement, a design movement that focused on traditional craftsmanship over machine-made products. The runway show was staged in Gatliff Warehouse, an unused former bus depot where McQueen held several of his shows, and featured paralympic athlete Aimee Mullins wearing intricately carved prosthetic legs made out of ash wood.

== Background ==
McQueen stated that the piece was inspired by High Moon, a 1991 installation artwork by Rebecca Horn.

Former ballerina Shalom Harlow was chosen to perform the piece, with her ballet experience contributing to the performance of the artwork. Harlow arrived on a red-eye flight the morning of the show, and did not rehearse the performance. Harlow commented that "There was no explanation, there was just a frock," and that "What you see is me responding to stimuli, just a moment of what unfolded when put in that situation."

The robots used in the piece were borrowed from a car manufacturing plant. McQueen noted that it took a week to program their movements. Sam Gainsbury, one of the show's producers, said that "[McQueen] wrote precise instructions to the factory about how he wanted the machines to move, joint by joint, like spitting cobras."

== Description ==
After the main show, the electronic music playing in the venue switched to "The Swan" by Camille Saint-Saëns. Harlow walked alone onto the runway, wearing a strapless white tulle dress with one belt above the bust and another in the back. She stood on a small circular platform, in-between two robotic arms. As the platform began to rotate, the robotic arms slowly started to move as though waking from sleep, then moved closer to Harlow, seeming to investigate her. The robots snapped back, then launched forward, spraying Harlow with black and acid yellow paint. Harlow cowered and flailed her arms in the air in reaction to the robots' movements.

When the robots were finished spraying their paint, they receded backwards. Harlow staggered off the platform and displayed herself to the audience in, according to Harlow, "complete abandon and surrender."

== Reception ==
The immediate audience reaction was loudly celebratory. Harlow said of the response to the piece, "I knew in the moment that it was extraordinary, that something unique had happened. People were brought to tears, so yeah, I knew."

Suzy Menkes reviewed the show for the International Herald Tribune, calling it "the triumph of London's fashion week" and describing the finale as "extraordinary."

Vogue's retrospective review of the show focused exclusively on the finale, calling it "potent stuff" and commenting that "It wasn't a fashion show. It was performance art."

In a review celebrating the piece's twenty-year anniversary, Vogue critic Sarah Mower, who attended the show, described it as "surely up there amongst the top 10 fashion show thrills of all time" and "heart-stoppingly inspirational," noting that McQueen "lulled [the audience] along into a false sense of tranquility" with the relatively long and calm show prior to the finale.

McQueen himself was ecstatic, saying, "It was the most fantastic show I have ever seen in my life. It was just incredible — it was poetry." He stated that the show was "the only one that actually made [him] cry."

== Analysis ==
Much critical, academic, and popular analysis has been devoted to the piece, with themes including technology, sexuality, the role of the artist, patriarchy, and McQueen's own life.

When asked about interpretations of the piece, Shalom Harlow said:

"I don't want to put words on what his intention was, but from the inside there definitely felt like an aggressive, predatory sexualisation of the mechanisation of modern world and interfering with some very raw aspect of femininity, and I don't mean that as women I mean, in terms of our own internal virginal selves. This overlay of what's interjected upon all of us by the external world in this forceful, mechanised modern world that we're meant to interface with. That's what it felt like in the moment, that's what I was expressing."

For the Metropolitan Museum of Art's career retrospective exhibition Alexander McQueen: Savage Beauty, Harlow commented to curator Andrew Bolton:

"It almost became this like aggressive sexual experience in some way. And I think that this moment really encapsulates, in a way, how Alexander related to—at least at this particular moment—related to creation. Is that all of creation? Is that the act of a human being being created, the sexual act? Is it the act of, you know, the Big Bang, if you will, that violence and that chaos and that surrender that takes place?"

Katherine Gleason, author of Alexander McQueen: Evolution, writes that "these robots seem to have emotions. Are they somewhat human? And if they are, then what are we?"

Art historian Robert McCaffrey wrote about the piece's engagement with the philosophical theme of the sublime, arguing that "McQueen unsettles his audience and in so doing creates a gateway to the Sublime—but not the Sublime in nature, rather the Sublime in the uncanny power of the machine age." McCaffrey writes that the piece defies the common understanding of mechanization, as the robots seem to sense, feel, and think, creating an uncanny valley effect. He also connects McQueen's work to Yves Klein's Anthropométries in its emphasis on gender and patriarchy, thus anchoring the machine "to the human tendency to dominate and oppress."

Kate Bethune of the Victoria and Albert Museum connected the work to the show's inspiration, the Arts and Crafts movement, suggesting that the finale may have been "intended as a counterpoint to William Morris's anti-industrial ethic, provoking comment on the interaction between man and machine at the turn of the twenty-first century."

Rachel Tashjian, the fashion news director at Harper's Bazaar, interpreted the moment as autobiographical, saying that it "always read to [her] as a statement about McQueen's tortured creativity, the way that creation is violence inflicted upon the materials (and people) tasked with carrying out the vision. It is a beautiful image but it is also a brutal one."

Many have interpreted the work as a reference to the cultural motif of the dying swan, as this is the theme of the music used in the piece. The dress itself and Harlow's movements have also been described as swan-like.

== Legacy ==
Vogue included the piece on a list of McQueen's most memorable runway moments, noting that it "cemented [his] reputation as the ultimate showman."

Several designs by the Alexander McQueen fashion house in later years, under the creative direction of Sarah Burton following McQueen's death, have drawn comparisons to the No. 13 finale.

The 2012 premiere of season four of RuPaul's Drag Race paid homage to the piece, as contestants stood on a rotating platform while being hosed with neon paint.

For the 2019 opening of the Times Square EDITION hotel, hotelier Ian Schrager commissioned an art installation in reference to McQueen, with notable people in fashion such as Alex Lundqvist in all-white outfits, spinning on a platform and sprayed with paint by robotic arms.

The finale of Coperni's Spring/Summer 2022 show, which featured Bella Hadid being sprayed with Fabrican, was compared to the No. 13 Finale, with several commentators calling Coperni's finale an homage to McQueen's. The brand drew similar comparisons for their Fall/Winter 2023 show, which included robotic dogs interacting with the models.

== See also ==
- Illusion of Kate Moss
