= Rokeby School =

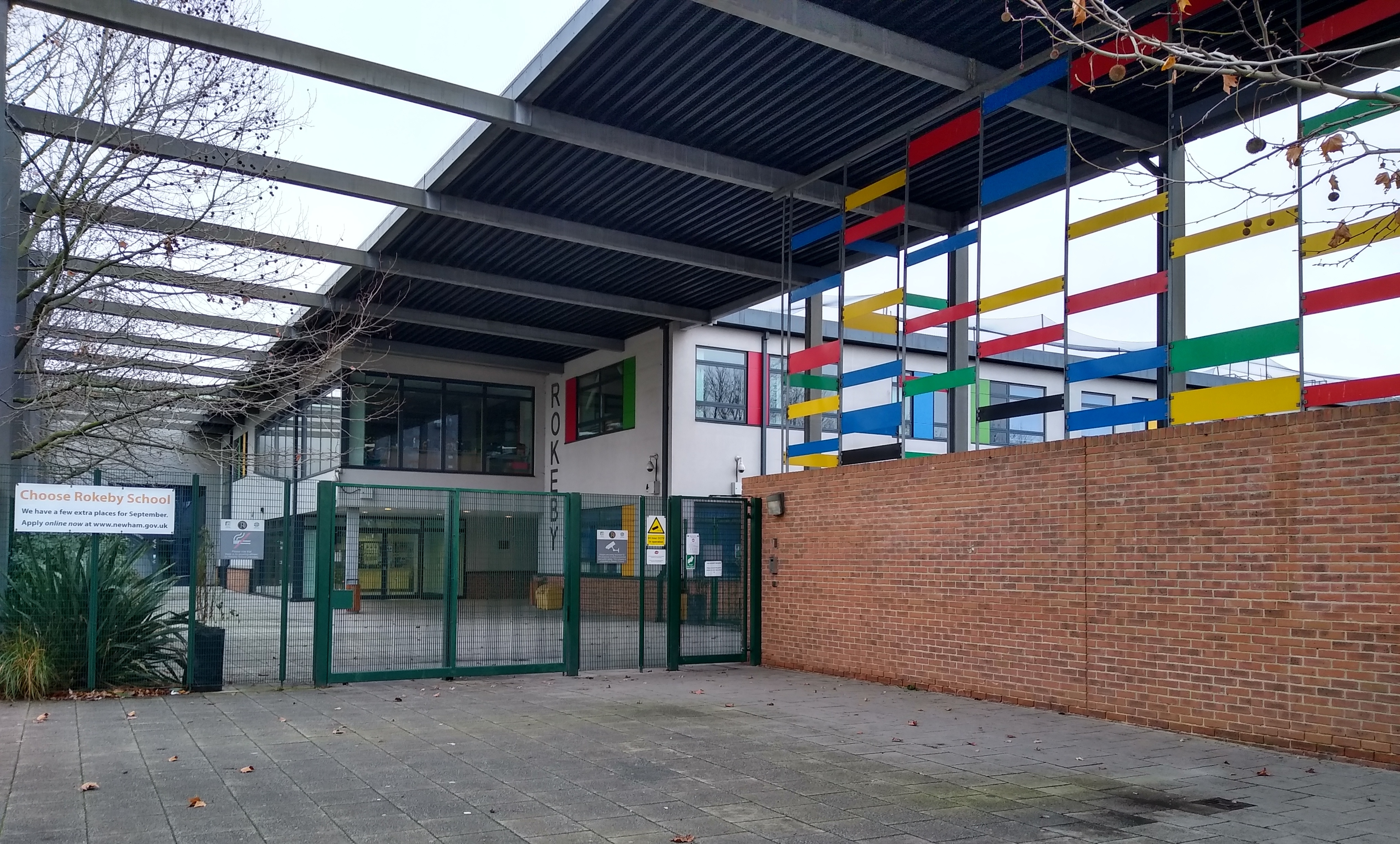

Location
- Barking Road; Canning Town, Greater London, E16 4DD; England; 51.51864°N 0.01558°E

Information
- Type: Academy
- Local authority: Newham London Borough Council
- Trust: Newham Community Schools Trust
- Department for Education URN: 148901 Tables
- Ofsted: Reports
- Head teacher: Bhavesh Galoria
- Gender: Boys
- Age range: 11–16
- Enrolment: 770 (2019)
- Capacity: 900
- Colour: Yellow Black 🟨⬛️
- Website: www.rokeby.newham.sch.uk

Rokeby School is an 11–16 secondary school for boys located in Canning Town, Greater London, England.

In 2010 the school relocated to new building on the Barking Road. Facilities at the school include technology and ICT rooms, a six court indoor sports hall, outdoor cricket/badminton area, creative arts areas, a performance theatre, an all-weather multi-use games pitch and a fitness trail.

Previously a foundation school administered by Newham London Borough Council, in December 2021 Rokeby School converted to academy status. It is now sponsored by the Newham Community Schools Trust.

Rokeby School offers GCSEs and BTECs as programmes of study for pupils.

== Notable former pupils ==
- Vince Hilaire, Retired footballer
- Roger Griffiths, Actor East Enders
- Calvin Bassey, footballer
- Alexander McQueen, fashion designer
- Ricky Norwood, actor
