= Eshu (collection) =

2000 fashion collection by Alexander McQueen

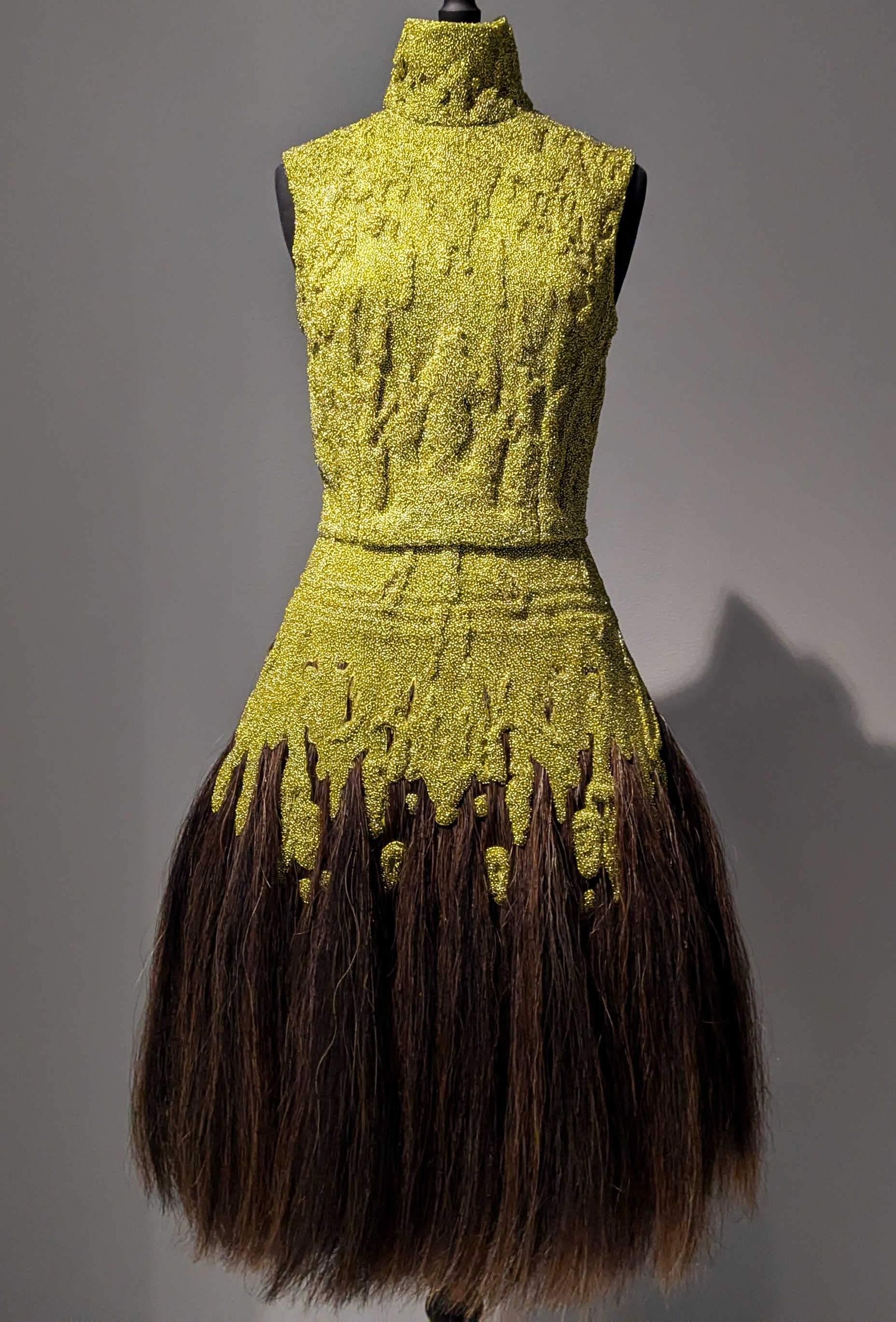
Look 37 from Eshu at Lee Alexander McQueen & Ann Ray: Rendez-Vous (2024)

Eshu is the sixteenth collection by British fashion designer Alexander McQueen, released for the Autumn/Winter 2000 season of his eponymous fashion house. Its name comes from Eshu, a trickster god in the Yoruba religion variously identified with travellers, luck, and death. Drawing on the twentieth century dress of the Yoruba people of West Africa, the collection presents an aesthetic of primitivism that contrasts couture techniques and luxury materials with distressed garments and an emphasis on animal materials. Many garments had silhouettes which were deliberately exaggerated away from Western norms, although others featured more conventional tailoring.

The runway show was staged on 15 February 2000 at the derelict Gainsborough Studios building in London, among mounting opposition to McQueen's use of fur. The day before, anti-fur protesters broke into the venue and vandalised the set, and a small group of protesters harassed guests on the day of, although the show proceeded regardless. Runway theatrics were kept to a minimum, with no special effects or grand finale; the only set dressing was covering the runway with shards of slate. Sixty-three looks were presented, including several showpieces. (Note: For convenience, when referring to individual looks, this article uses the numbering from the Vogue retrospective of the collection. Their overview counts 64 looks, but contains errors that cause the count to be incorrect. Look numbers mentioned in this article have not been adjusted. The Vogue count contains the following errors: the photos for Looks 10 and 11 and Looks 42 and 44 are alternate angles of the same two looks, respectively. The photo for Look 63 also shows Look 64, which was not separately photographed.) Accessories were inspired by African traditions, including neck rings, nose bars, and one mouthpiece that forced the lips wide open.

Contemporary response to the collection was mixed. McQueen had long been subject to accusations that his designs were misogynist, and the aggressive styling in Eshu reignited these criticisms. Later academic analysis reconsidered these accusations and commented on the African inspiration and natural materials. Items from the collection have appeared in exhibitions like the retrospective Alexander McQueen: Savage Beauty.

== Background ==
British fashion designer Alexander McQueen was known for his imaginative, sometimes controversial designs, and dramatic fashion shows. Over the course of his career, which lasted from 1992 until his death in 2010, he explored a broad range of ideas and themes, particularly sexuality, death, violence, romanticism, and historicism. McQueen began his career as an apprentice on Savile Row in the late 1980s, earning a reputation as an expert tailor. From October 1996 to October 2001, McQueen was – in addition to his responsibilities for his own label – head designer at French fashion house Givenchy.

McQueen's personal fixations had a strong influence on his designs. From the earliest years of his career, he experimented with unconventional materials and visual techniques. He was fascinated with nature and often used related motifs and materials, including real animal parts, in his designs. He was also inspired by the work of his favourite photographers, and several collections had garments with photograph prints. He read widely to draw inspiration from world cultures, infusing his collections with concepts borrowed from traditional ethnic dress and jewellery. McQueen's Autumn/Winter 1997 collection It's a Jungle Out There had been African-inspired, featuring neck rings and animal parts. Neck rings reappeared in The Overlook (Autumn/Winter 1999) in the form of a corset that covered the whole torso. By that point, these hard moulded bodices had become a McQueen signature.

The violent, sexualised styling McQueen deployed in his early career often resulted in the press accusing him of misogyny. McQueen consistently objected to this characterisation. In an April 1995 interview following Highland Rape (Autumn/Winter 1995), he had said that he designed with his lesbian friends in mind, and was not attempting to appeal to most straight women. Responding to press accusations that the designs in The Hunger (Spring/Summer 1996) were misogynist, McQueen similarly rebutted that most of the female models who walked in the show were lesbians.

== Concept and collection ==
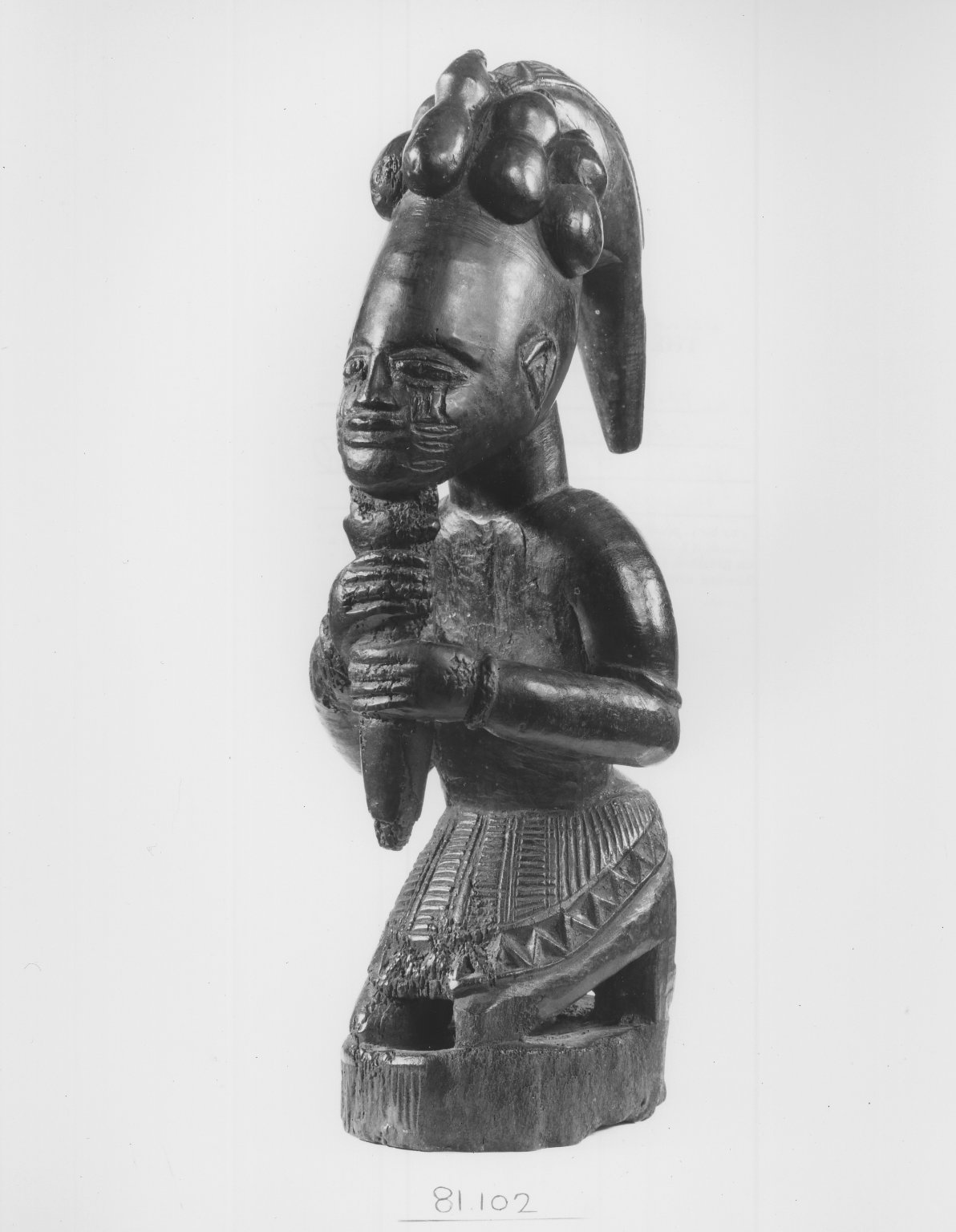
Yoruba figure depicting Eshu, late 19th or early 20th century

Eshu (Spring/Summer 2000) is the sixteenth collection McQueen designed for his eponymous fashion house. McQueen was interested in the styles and rituals associated with traditional African dress, and how these traditions were influenced and changed by colonialism. Drawing on the twentieth century dress of the Yoruba people of West Africa, the collection presents an aesthetic of primitivism using couture techniques and luxury materials. By this period, Yoruba women had incorporated into their day-to-day fashion many elements introduced by European missionaries in the nineteenth century. Silhouettes were inspired by Victorian fashion, such as cinched waists, voluminous skirts, and balloon sleeves, but used traditional African materials and aesthetics. The collection is named for Eshu, a trickster god in the Yoruba religion variously identified with travellers, luck, and death. Eshu was said to delight in creating strife and division, sometimes as a test for humans.

As was common for McQueen, Eshu featured motifs and materials that reflected the beauty and power of nature. Faux roses in fabric and leather appeared on several looks. Others incorporated animal materials including leather, shearling, springbok skin and hair, and rabbit fur. Some items featured wooden beads, a natural material that also referenced traditional African jewellery. The hems of many items were cut roughly and distressed with red clay, reminiscent of the experimental techniques McQueen had employed in his early days. Several garments from his first professional fashion show, Nihilism (Spring/Summer 1994), had been similarly distressed with paint, rust, or mud.

McQueen sought to "push the silhouette" of Western fashion by giving many designs unusually voluminous shapes. To this end, there were exaggerated shoulders, chunky white knits, and dresses with full Victorian skirts. He also included more conventional items such as distressed crop tops and his signature tailored frock coats. Other tailored items included skirt suits with square shoulders, cropped sleeves, and zipped fronts. McQueen's low-rise bumster trousers appeared in denim. For evening-wear, there were black dresses, one embellished with crystals.

Accessories for the collection were aggressive and inspired by traditional African styles. The show's opening look featured a wooden mask by McQueen's preferred milliner, Philip Treacy. As usual, McQueen relied on Shaun Leane for jewellery, which included coiled neck rings, oversized hoop earrings, and nose bars. One model was fitted with a silver mouthpiece that forced her lips wide open into a snarling expression, a look which Dana Thomas thought may have been "inspired by a Yoruba totem".

== Runway show ==
Model from Look 56, fitted with the snarling mouthpiece and large hoop earrings

=== Preceding circumstances ===
McQueen's previous show, Eye (Spring/Summer 2000), had been shown in New York rather than his home city of London. At the time, he stated that the move to New York was a business decision intended to showcase his brand beyond London Fashion Week, and was clear from the outset that he intended to return to England the following season. (Note: McQueen spoke to the Evening Standard backstage before the show. When asked if he thought American designers would be jealous of his show, he commented "Fuck 'em," going on to say that he was not planning on returning to New York in any case. Judith Watt and Dana Thomas quote these comments in their respective books as if they had been made after the show because McQueen was unhappy with the show's mixed reception.) As expected, Eshu marked McQueen's return to London.

McQueen had long used real fur and animal parts in his collections, including farmed fur for his work at Givenchy. Two seasons before Eshu, he had been criticised for featuring these materials in his own-label collection The Overlook. He argued that the rabbit fur and sheepskins his own label used were by-products of the food industry. In any case, Eshu attracted attention from anti-fur activists, some of whom broke into the venue the day before the show and vandalised the set with slogans. It was rumoured that they had placed a bomb or otherwise booby-trapped the stage.

On the day of the show, a small group of anti-fur protesters harassed the waiting journalists and celebrities, blocked by a crowd of police officers. Security was unusually tight because of the bomb threat rumours, and individual bag searches caused long lines. Celebrities in attendance included actors Helen Mirren, Ralph Fiennes, and Francesca Annis, singers Bjork and Sharleen Spiteri, and model Jade Jagger. Tracey Emin covered the collection for the revived Nova magazine.

=== Catwalk presentation ===
The runway show was staged on 15 February 2000 at the derelict Gainsborough Studios building in London. Alfred Hitchcock, McQueen's favorite director, had shot several of his early films there. The invitation featured a close-up detail of red-streaked hair. The presentation was managed by McQueen's usual collaborators, including Gainsbury & Whiting for production and Joseph Bennett for set design. (Note: Gainsbury & Whiting handled production for all of McQueen's professional shows. Bennett had designed all of McQueen's runways since No. 13 (Spring/Summer 1999).) Runway theatrics were kept to a minimum, with no special effects or grand finale. Producer Sam Gainsbury felt that McQueen's intent was to match the presentation to the clothes: "he had found this big empty location that was very raw; the collection was very raw".

The minimal stage dressing consisted of covering the runway with shards of slate. The soundtrack consisted of African drums and techno beats; models also had microphones on their feet so their footsteps could be heard over the sound system as well. They were styled with simple make-up, their hair slicked down and powdered with gold, referencing the wealth generated by gold mining in West Africa.

Sixty-three looks were presented in the runway show. Models entered on a pathway, built by the production team, which led from the top of the building to the runway on the ground floor. The collection included several showpiece looks. The first model wore a full-skirted Victorian-style ivory dress daubed with red mud, paired with an African-styled mask of wood trimmed with horsehair, possibly depicting Eshu. Diana Gärtner wore Look 7, a beige leather one-shouldered ball gown, hand-cut with feather patterns. The hem was roughly and asymmetrically cut away to show the wire-frame crinoline beneath. Karolina Malinowska wore Look 8, a full-length dress in white gauze with a bodice draped in wooden beads and a hem dipped in red mud. Looks 11 and 12 featured leather tops printed on the back with a 1932 Wanda Wulz photograph that superimposes the artist's portrait with her cat. The garments were slashed into narrow strips that were left to hang loosely. McQueen's by-then signature moulded torso appeared in Look 21, paired with a drop-waist skirt covered in handmade fabric roses. Alek Wek wore Look 37, a sleeveless fitted dress whose bodice and upper skirt were beaded in yellow-green, transitioning to a brown skirt of loose natural horsehair. For Look 56, the model was fitted with the snarling mouthpiece and large hoop earrings. Look 58 comprised an oversized black coat made from large coils of hair.

== Reception ==
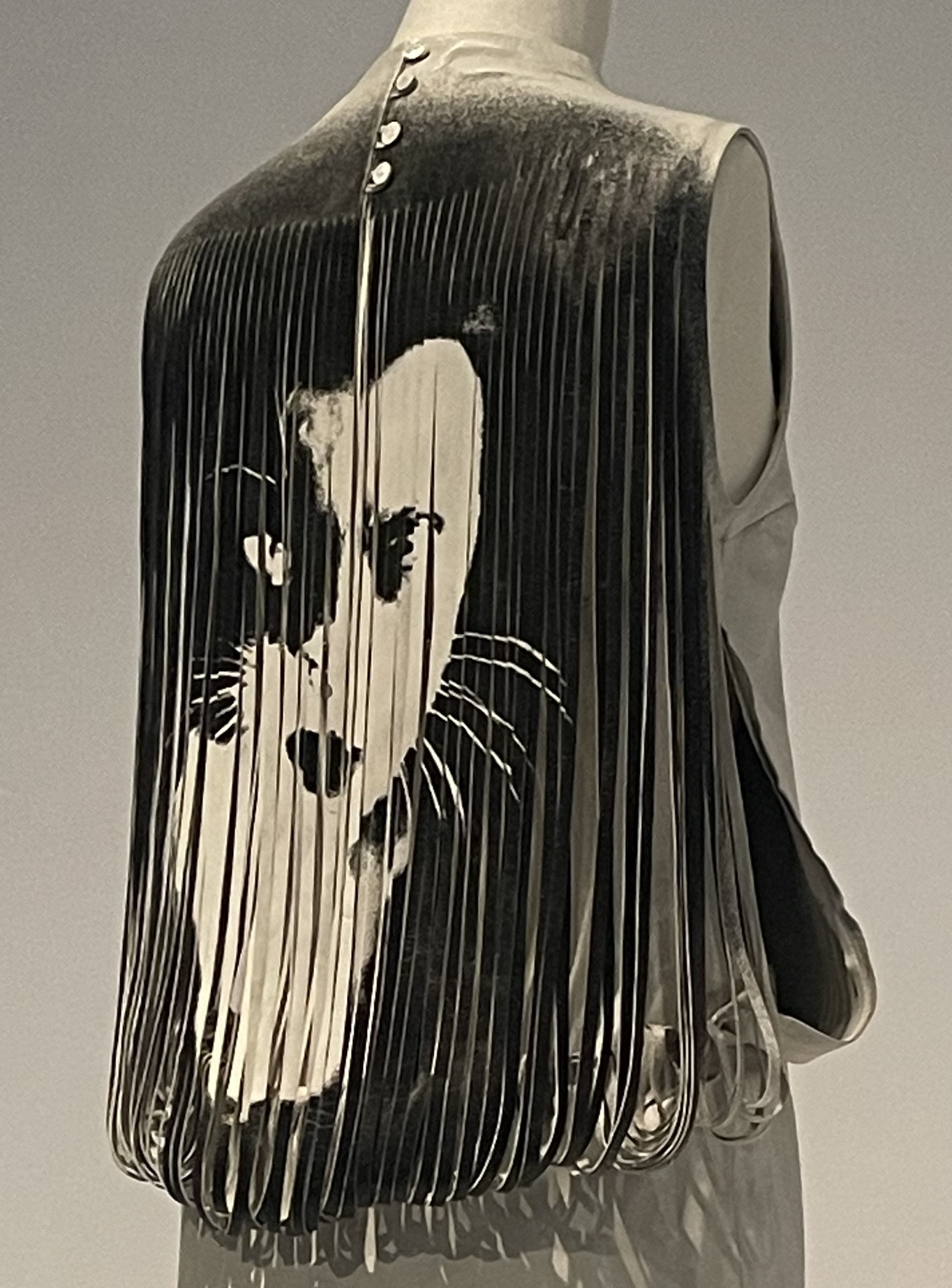
Look 11, printed with a Wanda Wulz photograph

Eshu drew a varied reception from contemporary critics, and retrospectives differ in their assessment of the critical consensus. Author Andrew Wilson called the collection divisive, noting that several female critics, including Joanna Pitman, Joan Smith, and Brenda Polan, had "believed the show to be symbolic of a deep-seated misogyny". In contrast, Katherine Gleason wrote that reception from fashion journalists was mostly positive, although she agreed that the popular press had accused McQueen of misogyny.

One polarised review came from Ginia Bellafante of The New York Times. She wrote that watching the show "felt like eavesdropping on a young man's therapy session, as he tried to work out very complicated feelings about his mother", and further criticised the high heels, heavy clothing, and mouthpiece as cruelty to the models. On the other hand, she found "much that was exceptional" about it, including several wearable pieces, and the hard torso from Look 21, which she thought "achieved the status of art".

Tracey Emin, an artist, was asked to review the collection for the revived Nova magazine. She was unhappy with much of the evening: the crowds outside frightened her, she felt the models were too young and looked unhappy, and she found herself wondering what she was doing there. She summed up her thoughts by writing that there was "nothing to celebrate" in the evening and there "just wasn't any Love [sic]". (Note: Reviewing the Nova relaunch for The Media Leader, Anna Wise complained that sending Emin to review the show was a rehash of a standard fashion magazine technique of sending a celebrity to review a fashion show.)

== Analysis ==
The apparent cruelty to women depicted in Eshu, and the attendant allegations of misogyny, were re-evaluated by critics in the 2010s. Author Andrew Wilson suggested that the true inspiration for the visual brutality in McQueen's work was his childhood experience of seeing his elder sister suffer domestic violence. In an interview with photographer Nick Knight, journalist Susannah Frankel argued that the snarling mouthpiece was not indicative of misogyny, but an example of McQueen's efforts to portray aggressive women who were "meant to scare you". She referenced the mistreatment of women that McQueen had witnessed in his family and felt that he may have been creating an image that he felt was empowering in order to "shore himself up" against his own fears and vulnerabilities. Frankel also noted that the models who wore his more difficult items, including the mouthpiece, were doing so because they were interested in the artistic challenge, rather than being pressured to. Curator Andrew Bolton, in a 2016 interview, recalled disagreeing with the contemporary accusations of misogyny, feeling instead that the jewellery conveyed a sense of "ferocity".

Authors have considered the collection's African inspiration, particularly the decision to draw on Eshu. In her 2012 overview of McQueen's work, Judith Watt compared the collection to It's a Jungle Out There (Autumn/Winter 1997), which was also African-inspired. She felt the previous collection was harsher and more feral, with "a backdrop of urban warfare". In comparison, she saw the models from Eshu as "romantic innocents" dabbling in African rituals. Wilson argued that McQueen may have identified with Eshu in his role as a creator of division and tried to fulfill a similarly provocative role with his own work. Watt thought McQueen, who was fascinated with death, had been interested in Eshu's associations with it. Theorist Anjali Vats critiqued McQueen's African-inspired collections as being more concerned with "appropriating oddities, stereotypes, and wild animals" than grappling with race. She felt they embodied the fashion industry's issues with cultural appropriation.

McQueen's choice of materials has drawn comment from critics. Curator Kate Bethune wrote that where McQueen had previously used imagery of "blood and flesh" to convey meaning, in Eshu, his ideas were "channelled through the material properties of skin, fur and hair." Bolton felt that Look 37 was a successful marriage of opposites, saying "McQueen contrasts the sophistication of the beading with the rawness of the hair." Academics B. F. Pires and R. P. Cidreira commented on the use of hair in McQueen's work. Although he had placed hair inside the lining and labels of certain early items, Look 58 marked the first time he had used it as the primary material. They described it as shocking to the audience because of the powerful and contrasting cultural associations evoked by hair, primarily disgust and beauty.

Jonathan Faiers analysed two garments from Eshu in an essay which examined McQueen's extensive nature references through the analytical lens of "becoming". Developed by the French academics Gilles Deleuze and Félix Guattari, this framework suggests that identity is a constant process of change, and is not bound to fixed ideas. He viewed Look 37, the yellow-green beaded horsehair dress, as an example of how McQueen evoked multi-faceted images of nature with his garments. He saw the irregular border between the beaded torso and the horsehair below as significant. In this transition zone, small lumps of beads detached from the main bodice are visible at the top of the skirt. Faiers began by comparing these clusters to "decorative head lice", visible mainly when the wearer moves; wearing the skirt makes one into a "site of becoming-lice, becoming-infested". He suggested that on second glance, the beads instead resembled algae on stagnant water. For Faiers, McQueen's preference for presenting abstracted, hybridised forms rather than directly imitating nature "set his work apart" and indicated a deeper understanding of natural materials compared to other designers.

Faiers identified Look 58, the black hair coat, as another showpiece with hybrid messaging. When examined closely, there are grey hairs identifiable within the black, and in places, the hair is worn away to reveal the structure beneath. In showing the effects of ageing, he felt that the "coat suggests the inexorable march towards old age and death". A person wearing it would, in his view, experience multiple levels of "becoming" – "becoming-hair, becoming-yeti, becoming unrecognizable". He compared it to an ensemble of dyed-black goat fur from The Horn of Plenty (Autumn/Winter 2009), identifying its origin points as the hair coat from Eshu as well as in experimental monkey fur garments designed by Elsa Schiaparelli in the 1930s. For Faiers, these garments represent "McQueen's ability to combine the natural world [...] with references to fashion history itself".

== Legacy ==
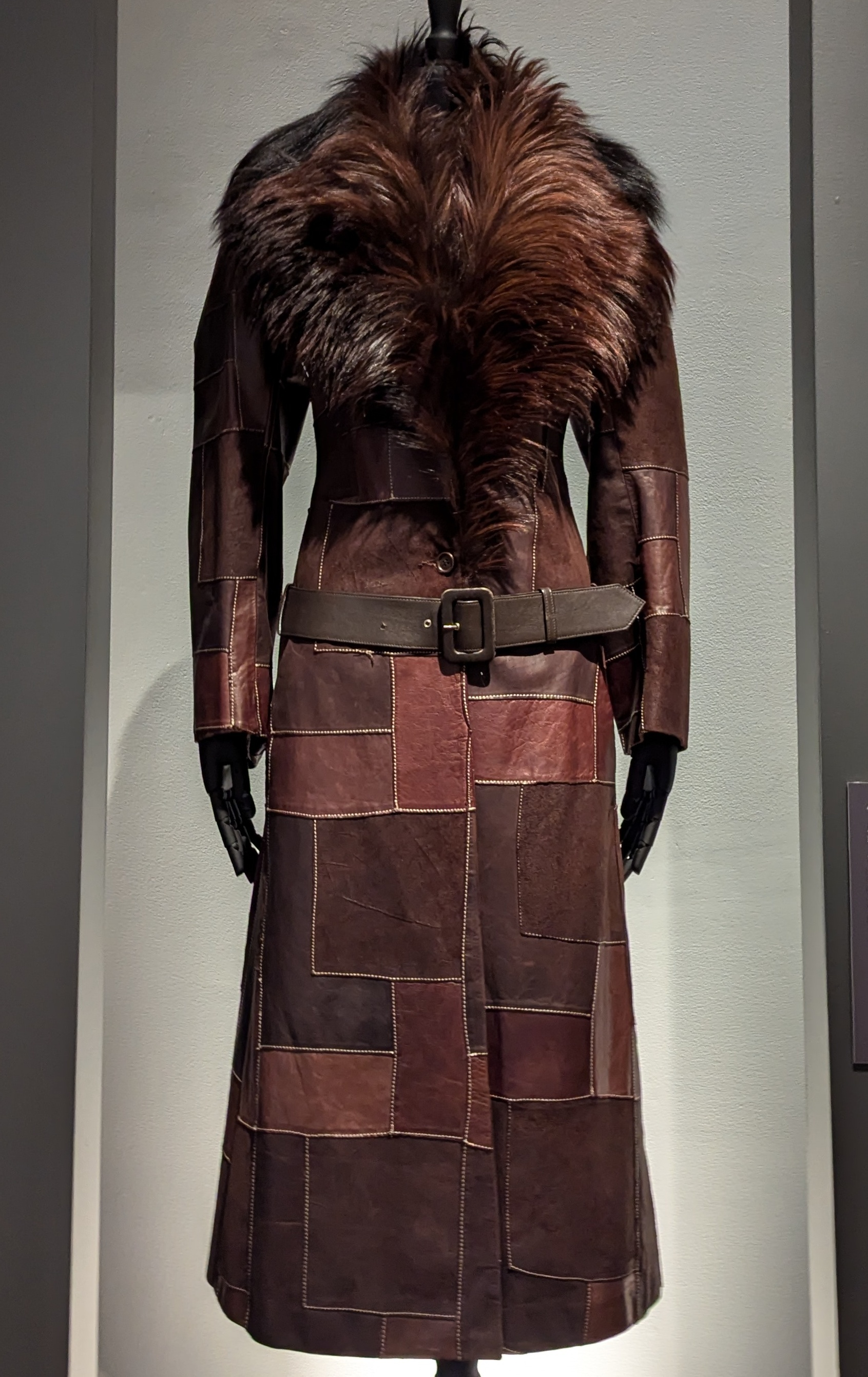
Look 29 at Rendez-Vous

Some celebrities have worn looks from Eshu. Bjork wore the distressed denim ball gown from Look 32 in a photo shoot for the September 2000 issue of Vogue. Model Naomi Campbell wore Look 47 from Eshu, a slate-grey suit with single-breasted jacket and cropped trousers, to the opening luncheon of her 2024 career retrospective exhibition Naomi: In Fashion.

Many designs from What a Merry-Go-Round (Autumn/Winter 2001) were reworked concepts from earlier collections, including Eshu. McQueen revisited the hard moulded bodice in later collections, including It's Only a Game (Spring/Summer 2005) and In Memory of Elizabeth Howe, Salem, 1692 (Autumn/Winter 2007).

=== Museum exhibits ===
When McQueen and Leane participated in the Fashion in Motion series at the Victoria and Albert Museum (V&A) in 2001, they included accessories from Eshu as part of their presentation. Four items from Eshu appeared in the 2011 exhibition Alexander McQueen: Savage Beauty, originally at the Metropolitan Museum of Art: Look 7, the dress of beige leather with metal wire crinoline; Look 8, the nude synthetic dress with mud and wooden beads; Look 37, the dress of yellow glass beads and black horsehair; and Look 58, the coat of black synthetic hair. These were placed in the Romantic Primitivism section of the exhibit. Five accessories from the collection appeared in the Cabinet of Curiosities section: a silver-plated resin neckpiece, craftsperson unspecified, and four pieces of jewellery in silver by Shaun Leane – a nose bar, a tusk mouthpiece, a pair of hooped earrings, and a set of coiled neck rings. The exhibition Lee Alexander McQueen: Mind, Mythos, Muse, originally staged in 2022, featured a copy of Look 11 – the dress printed with the Wanda Wulz photograph – owned by the Los Angeles County Museum of Art.

In 2013, a prototype bodice intended for the collection was sold at auction for £4,500. McQueen had commissioned leatherworker Delia Eccles to make the piece – made from fringed, interwoven red leather – from an original sketch. The design was reworked into the cream moulded bodice of Look 21, and the original red version was never used. Annabelle Neilson, a model and friend of McQueen's, died in 2018; in 2020, her collection of McQueen designs was auctioned, including a shift dress and a rabbit fur skirt from Eshu.

== Bibliography ==
- Bolton, Andrew (2004). Wild: Fashion Untamed. New York City: Metropolitan Museum of Art. ISBN 978-1-58839-135-3.
- Bolton, Andrew (2011). Alexander McQueen: Savage Beauty. New York City: Metropolitan Museum of Art. ISBN 978-1-58839-412-5. OCLC 687693871.
- Bolton, Andrew (2016). Manus × Machina: Fashion in an Age of Technology. New York City: Metropolitan Museum of Art. ISBN 978-1-58839-592-4.
- Breward, Christopher (2003). Fashion. Oxford: Oxford University Press. ISBN 978-0-19-158773-3.
- Elenowitz-Hess, Caroline (16 April 2022). "Reckoning with Highland Rape: Sexuality, Violence, and Power on the Runway". Fashion Theory. 26 (3): 399–417. doi:10.1080/1362704X.2020.1846325. ISSN 1362-704X. S2CID 229432510.
- Esguerra, Clarissa M.; Hansen, Michaela (2022). Lee Alexander McQueen: Mind, Mythos, Muse. New York City: Delmonico Books. ISBN 978-1-63681-018-8. OCLC 1289986708.
- Evans, Caroline (2003). Fashion at the Edge: Spectacle, Modernity and Deathliness. New Haven, Connecticut: Yale University Press. ISBN 978-0-300-10192-8.
- Fairer, Robert; Wilcox, Claire (2016). Alexander McQueen: Unseen. New Haven, Connecticut: Yale University Press. ISBN 978-0-300-22267-8. OCLC 946216643.
- Gleason, Katherine (2012). Alexander McQueen: Evolution. New York City: Race Point Publishing. ISBN 978-1-61058-837-9. OCLC 783147416.
- Homer, Karen (2023). Little Book of Alexander McQueen: The Story of the Iconic Brand. London: Welbeck Publishing Group. ISBN 978-1-80279-270-6.
- Knight, Nick (6 May 2015). Alexander McQueen: Susannah Frankel / Nick Knight Interview: Tusk Mouthpiece, Eshu A/W 00. SHOWstudio (Video).
- Knox, Kristin (2010). Alexander McQueen: Genius of a Generation. London: A&C Black. ISBN 978-1-4081-3223-4. OCLC 794296806.
- Mora, Juliana Luna; Berry, Jess (2 September 2022). "Creative Direction Succession in Luxury Fashion: The Illusion of Immortality at Chanel and Alexander McQueen". Luxury. 9 (2–3): 117–140. doi:10.1080/20511817.2022.2194039. ISSN 2051-1817.
- Oyeniyi, B.A. (2012). Dress and Identity in Yorubaland, 1880–1980 (PhD thesis). Leiden University.
- Pires, B. F.; Cidreira, R. P. (2018). "From hair to cultivated leather—the use of Alexander McQueen's genetic information". In Broega, Ana Cristina; Cunha, Joana; Carvalho, Helder; Blanco, Manuel; García-Badell, Guillermo; Goméz-Chacón, Diana Lucía (eds.). Reverse Design: A Current Scientific Vision From the International Fashion and Design Congress. Boca Raton: CRC Press. pp. 13–20. ISBN 978-1-138-37011-1.
- Thomas, Dana (2015). Gods and Kings: The Rise and Fall of Alexander McQueen and John Galliano. New York City: Penguin Publishing. ISBN 978-1-101-61795-3. OCLC 951153602.
- Vats, Anjali (March 2014). "Racechange is the new black: Racial accessorizing and racial tourism in high fashion as constraints on rhetorical agency". Communication, Culture & Critique. 7 (1): 112–135. doi:10.1111/cccr.12037. ISSN 1753-9129.
- Watt, Judith (2012). Alexander McQueen: The Life and the Legacy. New York City: Harper Design. ISBN 978-1-84796-085-6. OCLC 892706946.
- Wilcox, Claire, ed. (2015). Alexander McQueen. New York City: Abrams Books. ISBN 978-1-4197-1723-9. OCLC 891618596.
  - Bethune, Kate. "Encyclopedia of Collections". In Wilcox (2015), pp. 303–326.
  - Bolton, Andrew. "In Search of the Sublime". In Wilcox (2015), pp. 15–21.
  - Brown, Susanna. "Nightmares and Dreams". In Wilcox (2015), pp. 284–301.
  - Cullen, Oriole. "Crowning Glory". In Wilcox (2015), pp. 210–219.
  - Evans, Caroline. "Modelling McQueen: Hard Grace". In Wilcox (2015), pp. 189–201.
  - Faiers, Jonathan. "Nature Boy". In Wilcox (2015), pp. 123–137.
  - O'Neill, Alistair. "The Shining and Chic". In Wilcox (2015), pp. 261–280.
  - Phillips, Clare. "Armouring the Body". In Wilcox (2015), pp. 202–209.
  - Skogh, Lisa. "Museum of the Mind". In Wilcox (2015), pp. 178–188.
  - Wilcox, Claire. "Edward Scissorhands". In Wilcox (2015), pp. 25–33.
- Wilson, Andrew (2015). Alexander McQueen: Blood Beneath the Skin. New York City: Simon and Schuster. ISBN 978-1-4767-7674-3. OCLC 1310585849.
