= Alexander McQueen: Savage Beauty =

Exhibition at the Metropolitan Museum of Art

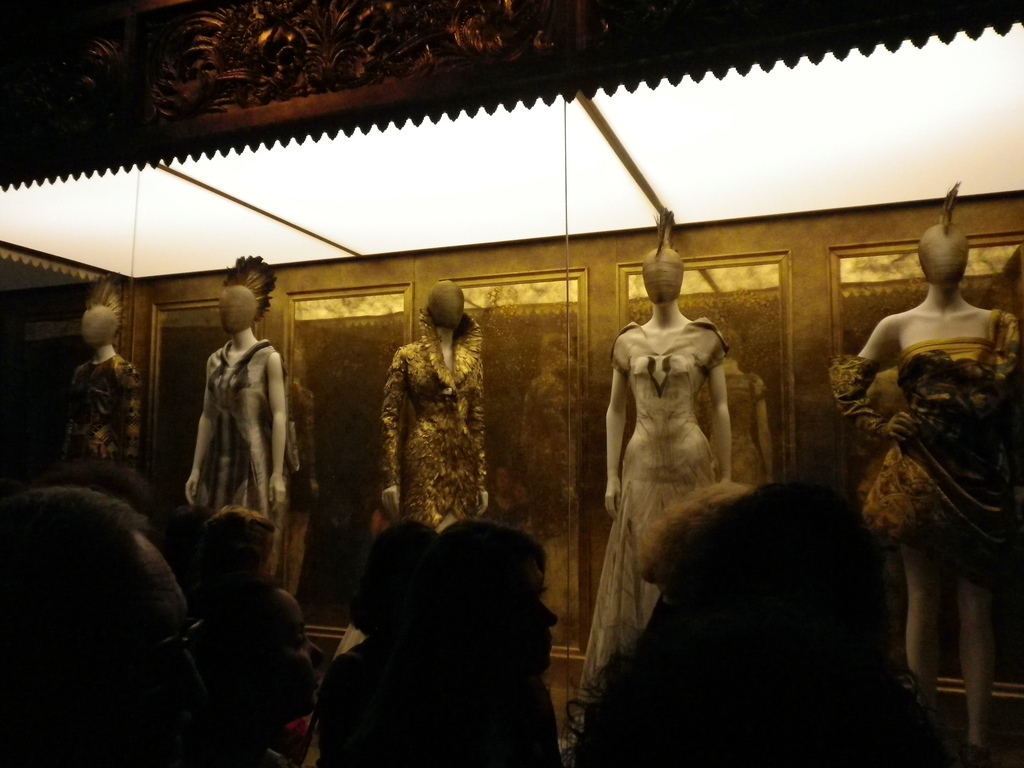
McQueen's last works at the Savage Beauty exhibition

Alexander McQueen: Savage Beauty was an art exhibition held in 2011 at the Metropolitan Museum of Art featuring clothing created by British fashion designer Alexander McQueen, as well as accessories created for his runway shows. The exhibit was extremely popular in New York City and resulted in what was then record attendance for the museum. The curators were Andrew Bolton and Harold Koda.

The show opened on May 4, a little more than one year after McQueen's death, and closed on August 7. Savage Beauty was shown again at the Victoria and Albert Museum in London from March 14, 2015, to August 2, 2015, but with additional items of exhibits.

== Contents ==
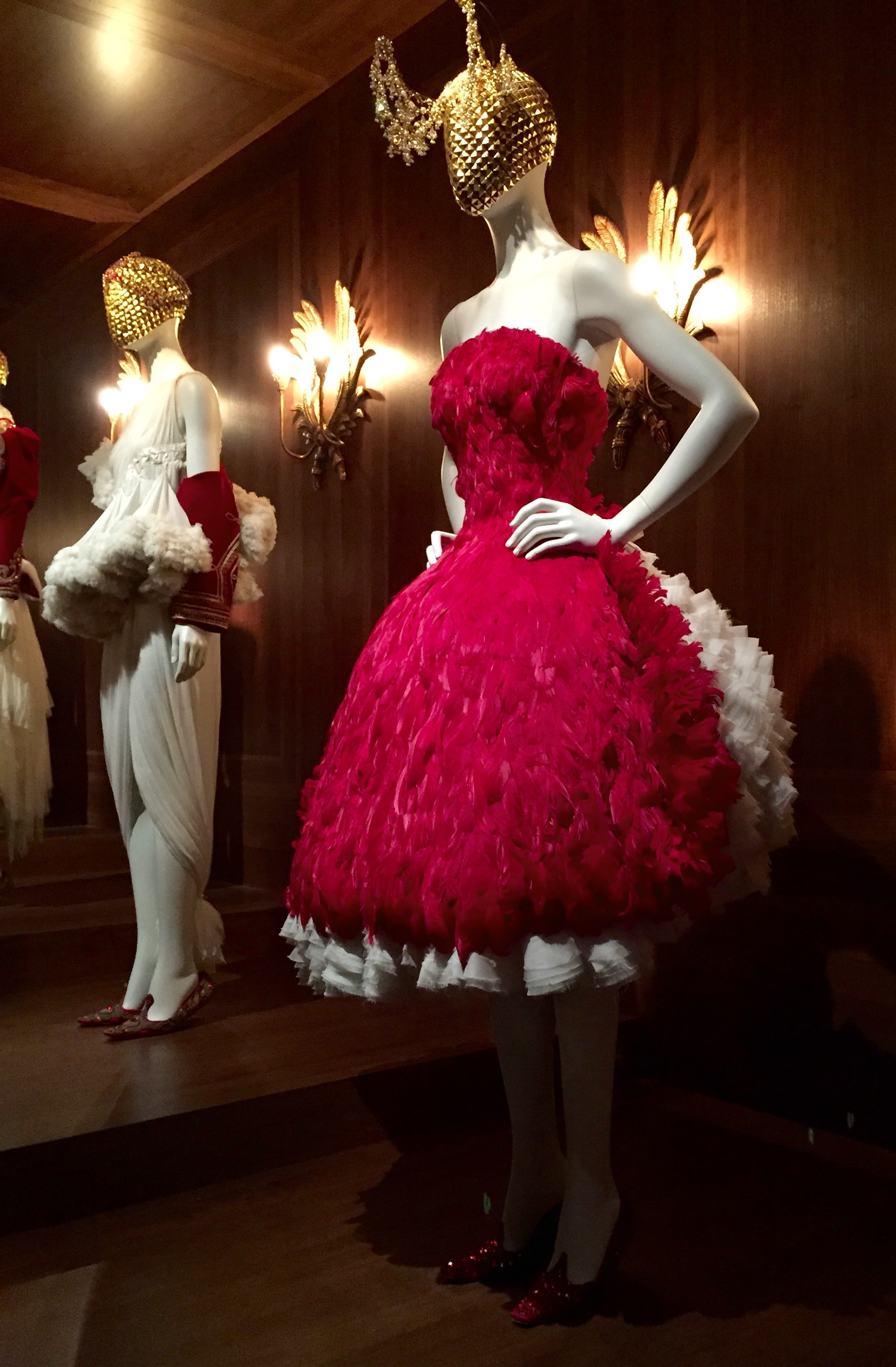
Savage Beauty exhibition at the V&A, clothes from The Girl Who Lived in the Tree (Fall/Winter 2008)

The exhibit was organized by the museum's Anna Wintour Costume Center and curated by Andrew Bolton and Harold Koda. The exhibit featured McQueen's pieces from the archives of his own London fashion house, Alexander McQueen, and of the Parisian couture house Givenchy, as well as pieces held in private collections. The show composed of six separate galleries, arranged by theme: "The Romantic Mind", which featured some of his oldest work in the early 1990s; "Romantic Gothic and the Cabinet of Curiosities", which featured his exploration of Victorian Gothic themes; "Romantic Nationalism", which examined Scottish and British identity; "Romantic Exoticism", which examined non-western influences in his designs; "Romantic Primitivism", which featured natural materials and organic designs; and "Romantic Naturalism", which featured his attempts to integrate themes of the natural world with technology.

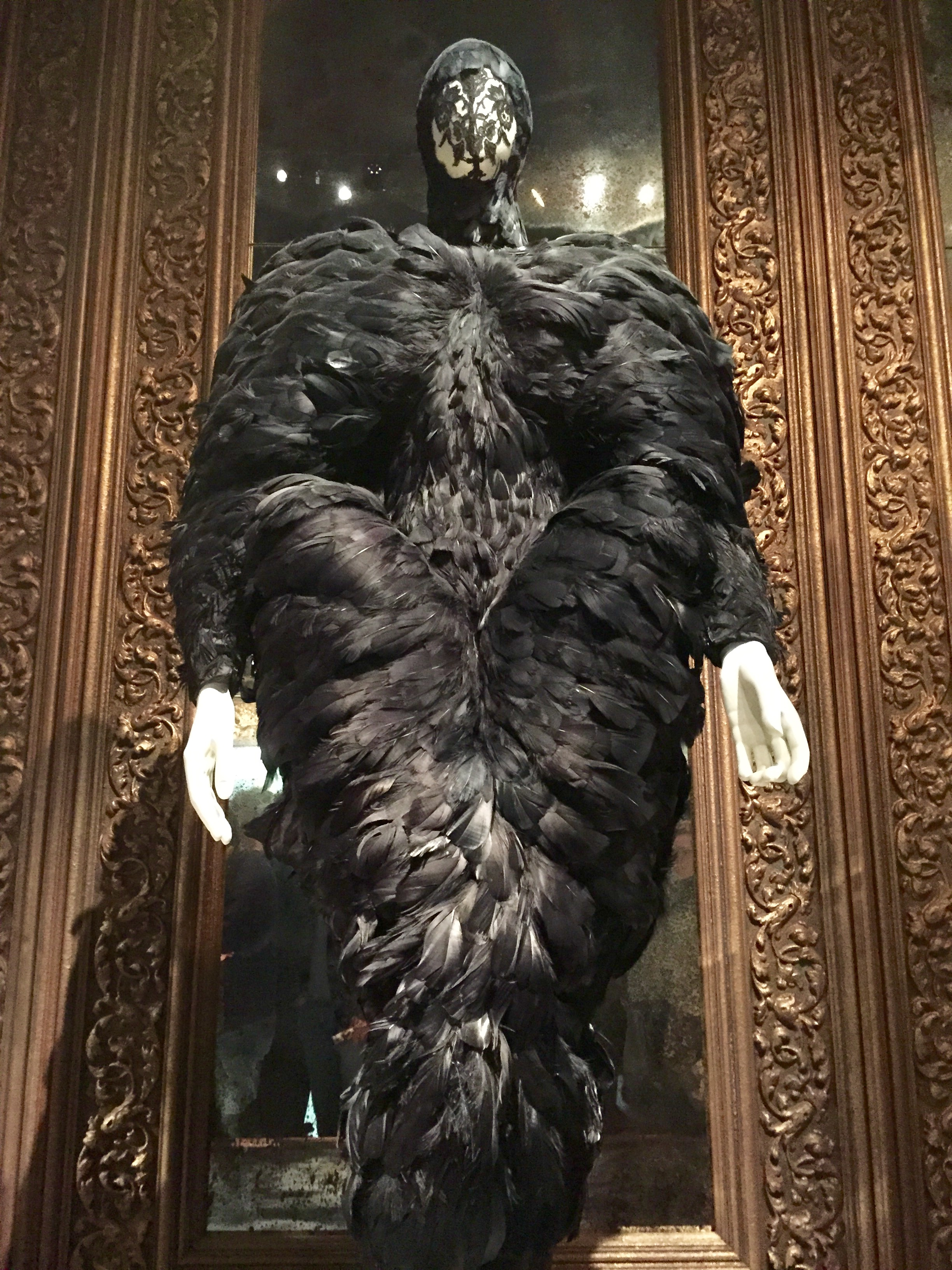
Dress from The Horn of Plenty (Fall/Winter 2009)

The exhibit included pieces from his first major collection, Jack the Ripper Stalks His Victims, created during his graduate studies at Central Saint Martins College of Art and Design. Items from almost all of McQueen's own-label collections were represented in the exhibition. The original life-size illusion of Kate Moss from The Widows of Culloden (Fall/Winter 2006) was featured. Also included in the exhibition were works by McQueen's collaborators such as the milliner Philip Treacy and jeweler Shaun Leane who produced designs used in his runway shows.

== Reception ==
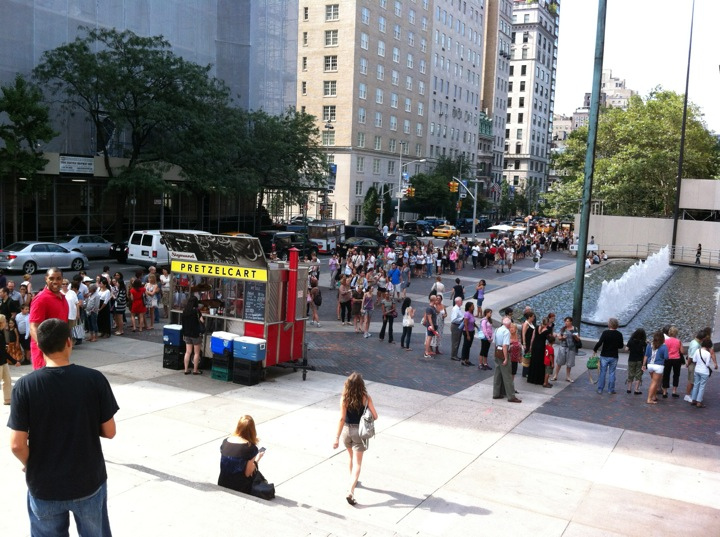
Queues outside the exhibition, August 3, 2011

The exhibit was widely praised by critics in the international press. Hilary Alexander of The Daily Telegraph called it "an absorbing, astounding walk through the extraordinary convolutions of his mind, and the technical virtuosity he could summon up in order to turn his ideas and thoughts into reality". Holland Cotter of The New York Times wrote that the show "is a button-pushing marvel: ethereal and gross, graceful and utterly manipulative, and poised on a line where fashion turns into something else", but also noted that the exhibit steers clear of addressing questions about the contradictions in his work. Suzy Menkes of The International Herald Tribune also had some issues with the presentation, "Mr. Bolton might have discussed the designer's place in the British art scene, alongside the Chapman brothers, or compared his fascination with nature's decadence with that of Damien Hirst. Instead, we get Sarah Jessica Parker's breathless and witless take on the McQueen style." Overall, though, she said the exhibit "is exciting, stimulating and thought-provoking – and a raw vision of the wild McQueen imagination." Judith Thurman of The New Yorker advised that "even if you never bother with fashion shows, go to this one. Andrew Bolton ... has assembled a hundred ensembles and seventy accessories ... and he gives their history and psychology an astute reading."

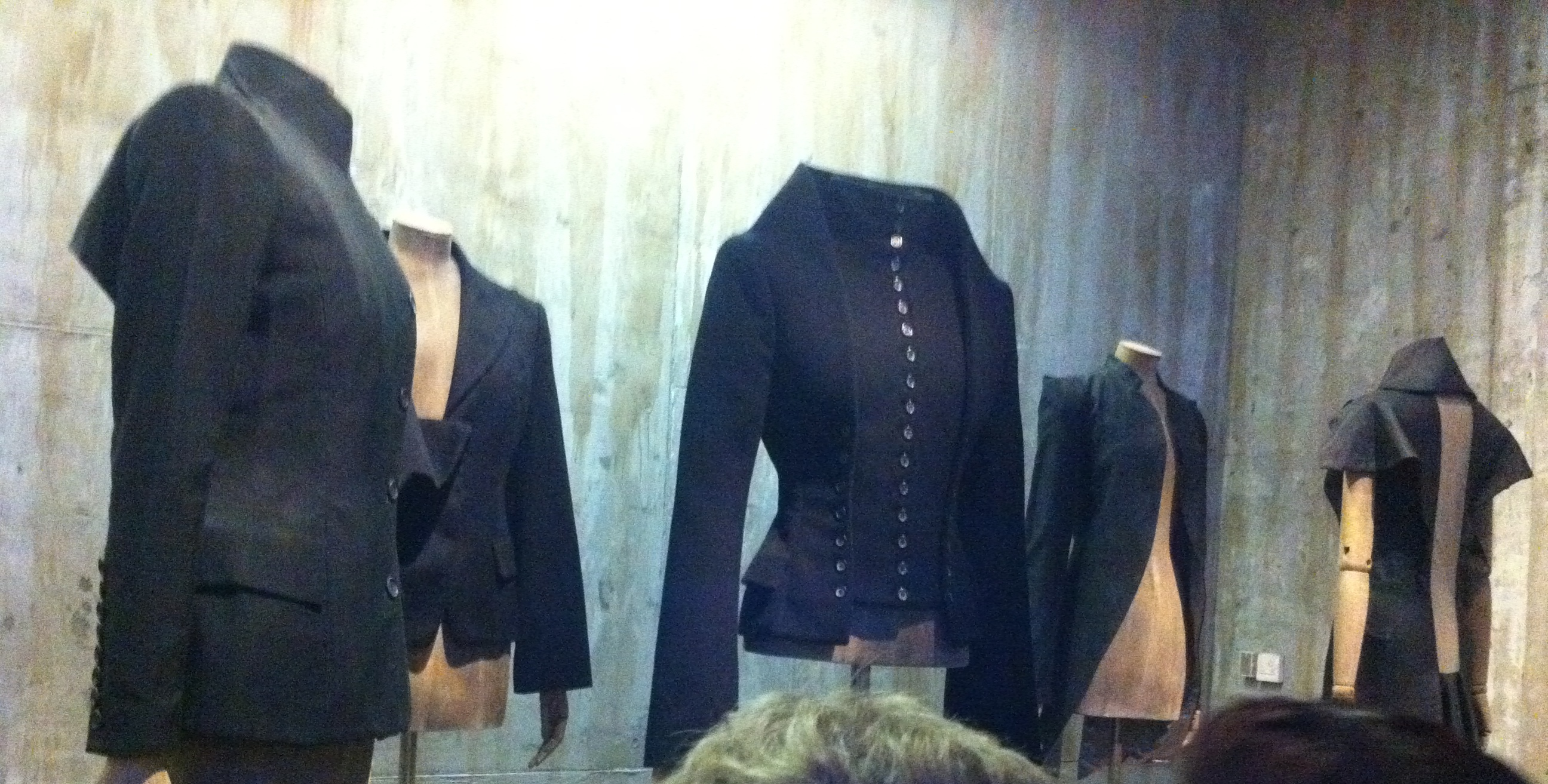
Various jackets

The show was also extremely popular with the public, leading the museum to take extraordinary measures to meet demand. Originally scheduled to run only until July 31 that year, it was extended through August 7. Patrons waited in lines of up to two hours to see the exhibit. To accommodate the large crowds, the Met offered a special $50 ticket to view the exhibit on Mondays, when the museum was usually closed. Over 17,000 of these tickets were sold. The Met also allowed its members to skip the line; museum membership increased 15%, with 20,000 new memberships sold during the show. During the final weekend of the exhibition, lines stretched to over four hours, and the museum stayed open until midnight for the first time in its history. By the time the exhibit closed, over 650,000 people had seen it, making it one of the most popular exhibits in the museum's history, and its most popular fashion exhibit ever.

== Subsequent showings ==
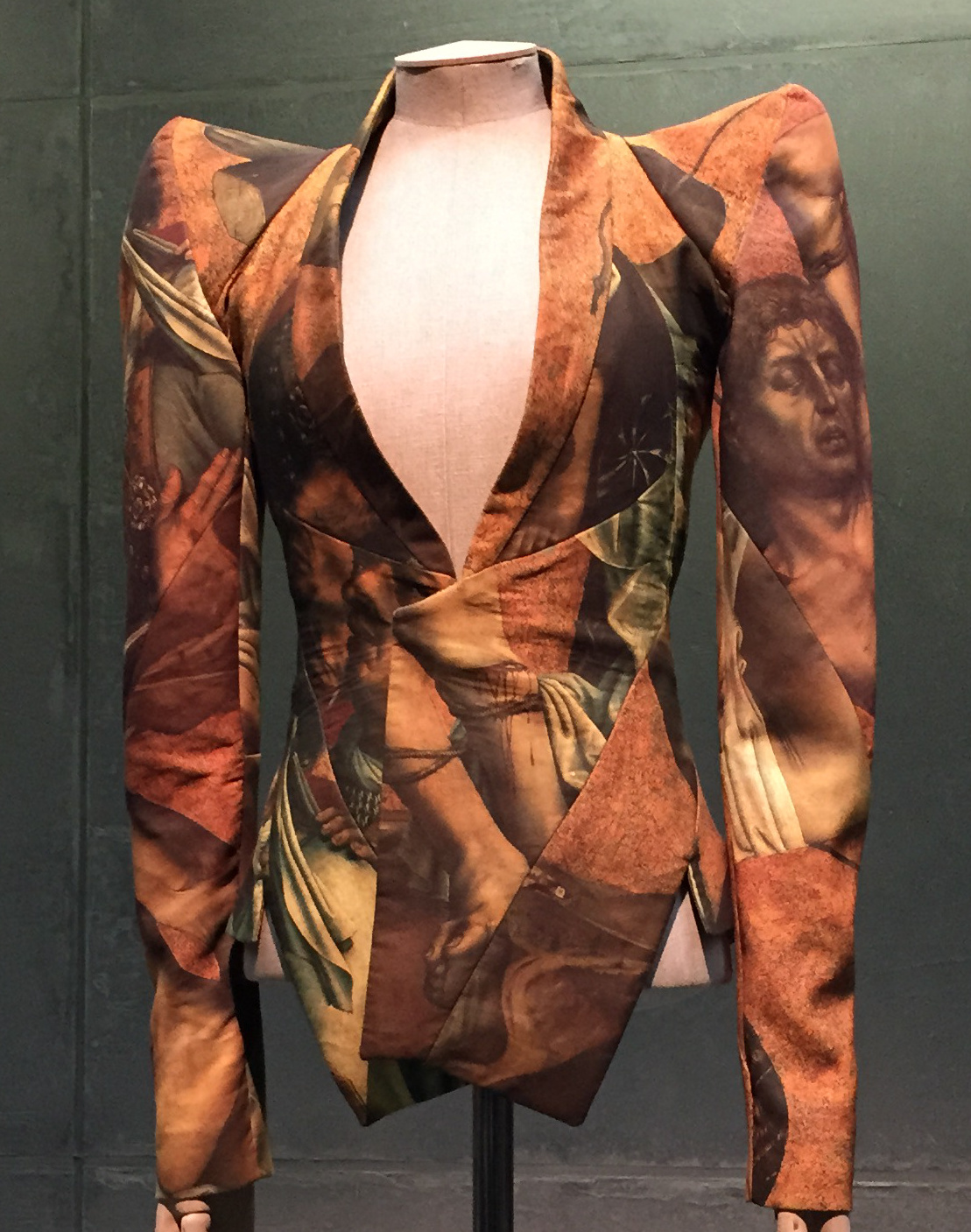
Jacket from the It's a Jungle out There collection displayed at the V&A Savage Beauty exhibition

From March 14, 2015, to August 2, 2015, the exhibition was housed in the Victoria and Albert Museum in London, where it was similarly well-received. The core of the exhibition remained the same as the one in the Metropolitan Museum, but 66 additional items of clothing and accessories were added, including rarely seen early works by McQueen. A new section was added focusing on pieces from his early career. The exhibition was the largest collection of works by McQueen and his collaborators ever assembled. Ticket sales exceeding 480,000 prompted museum management to implement overnight hours during the show's final two weekends in order to meet demand. This was the first time the museum had ever extended its hours this way to accommodate interest in an exhibition.

== Gallery ==
McQueen's fascination with the elemental—earth, wind, fire and water—imbued his collections with primordial drama. Nature and its materials were a constant in McQueen's work.

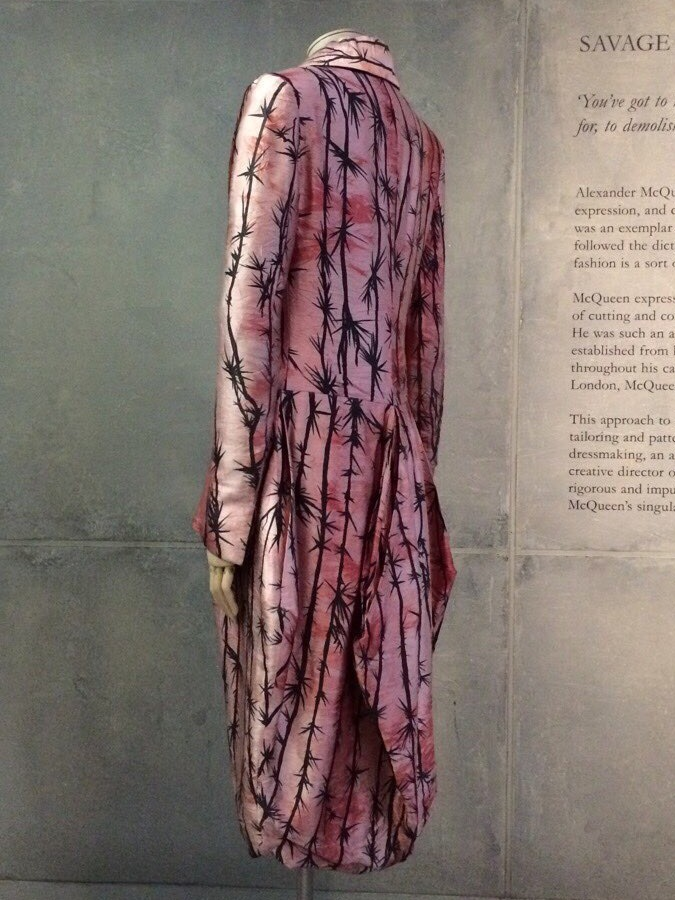
Thorn print jacket from Jack the Ripper Stalks His Victims, 1992 graduation collection

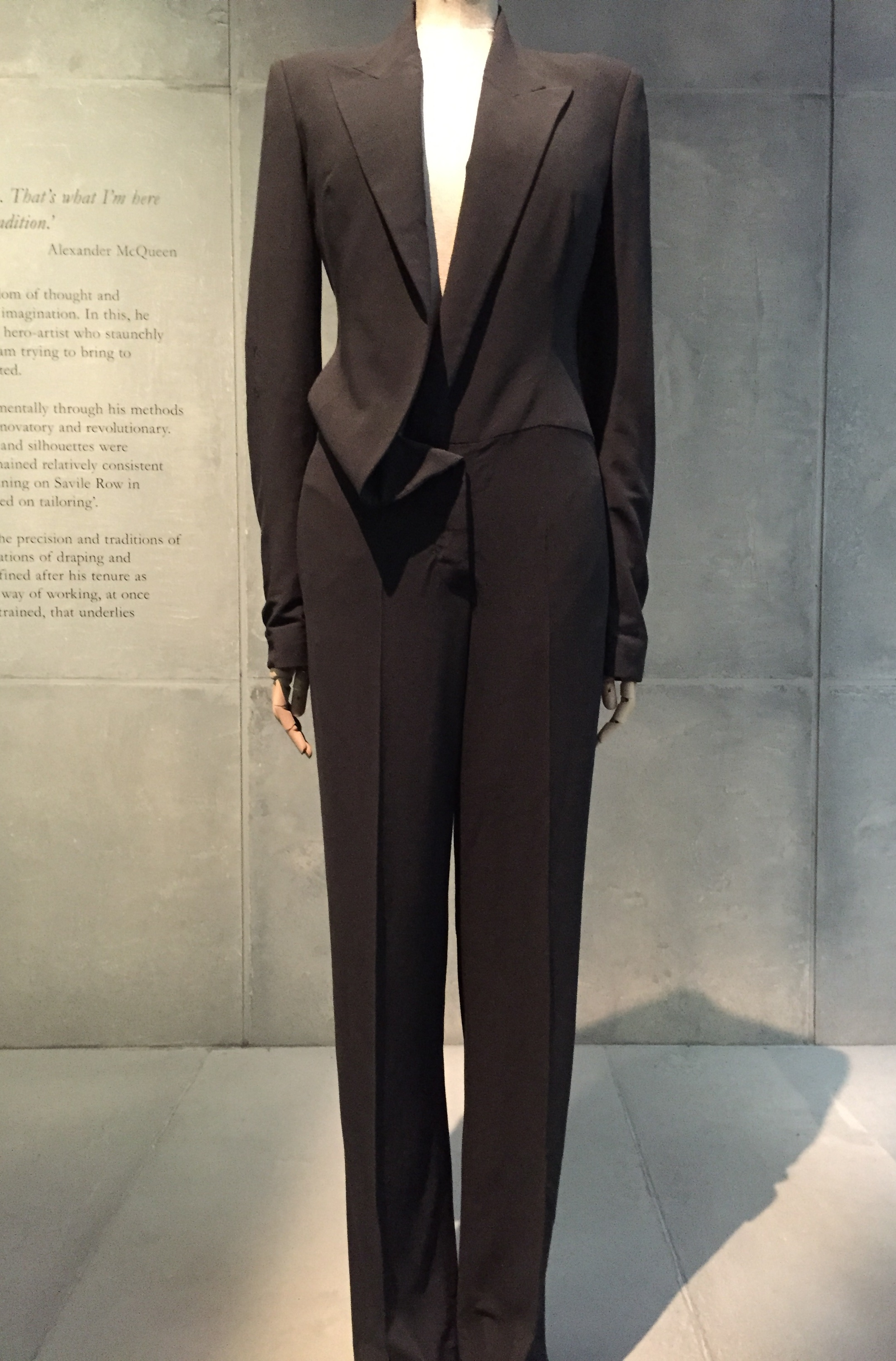
Black suit from Bellmer La Poupée (Spring/Summer 1997)

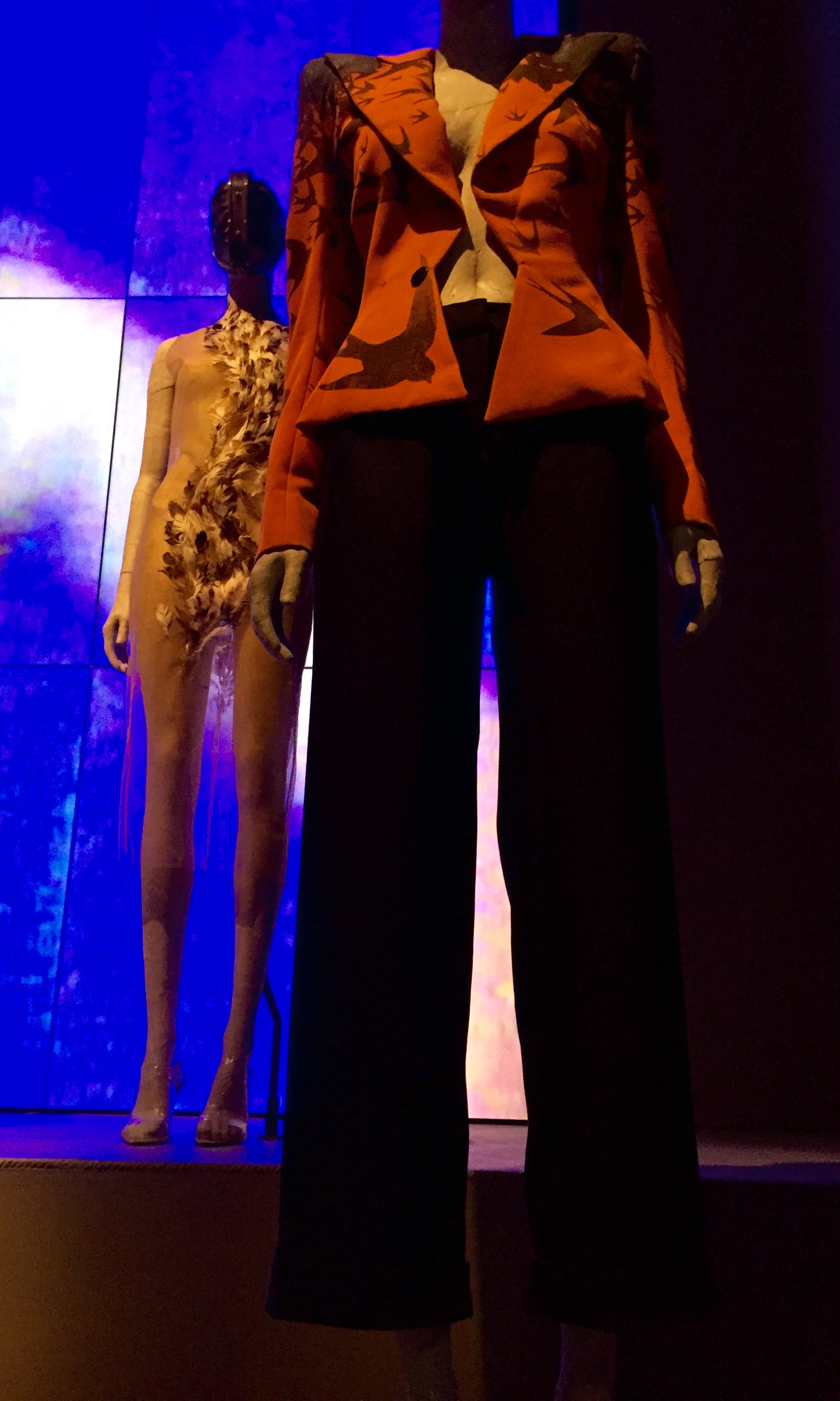
Ensembles from The Birds (Spring/Summer 1995; front) and The Hunger (Spring/Summer 1996; back)

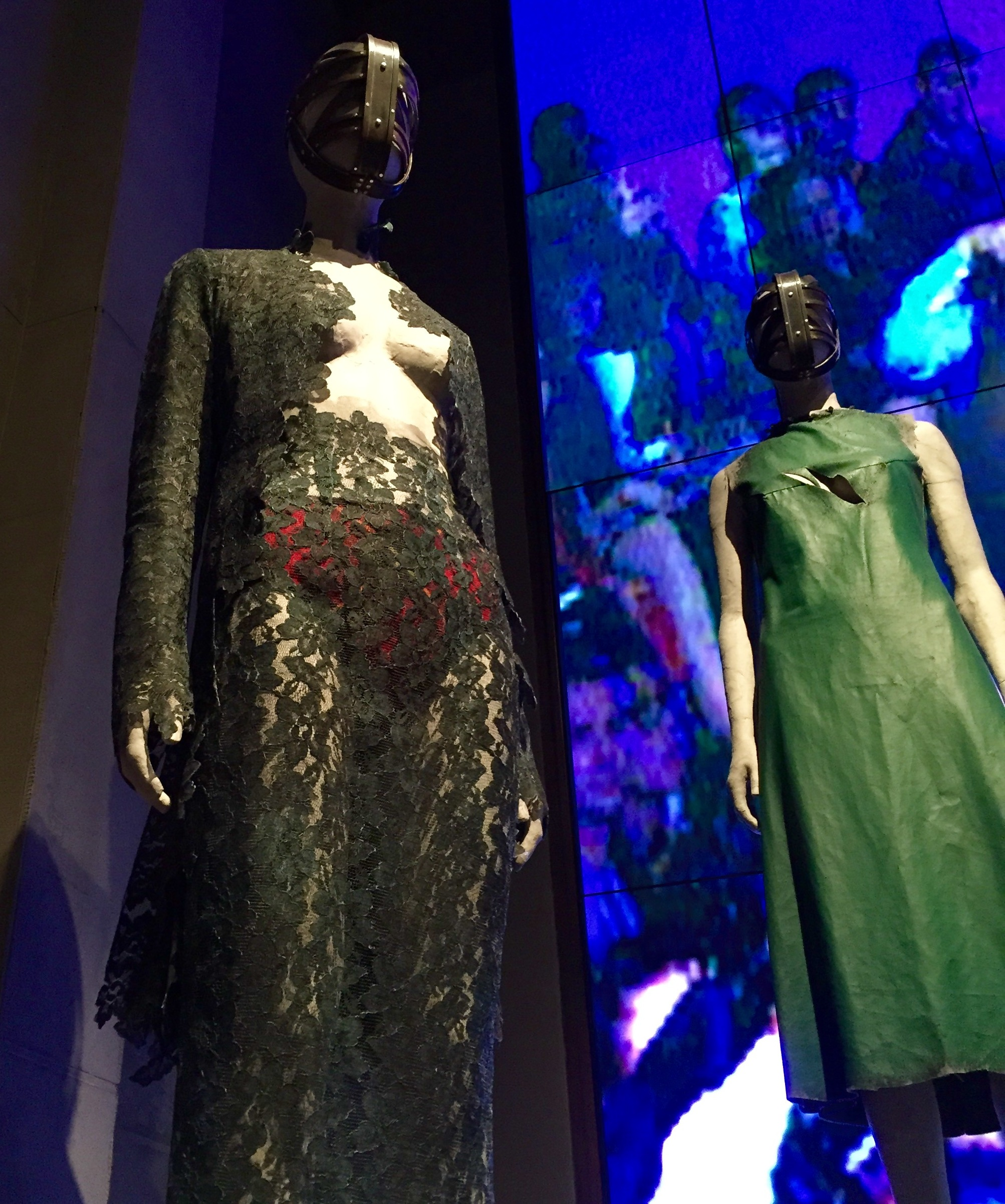
Dresses from Highland Rape (Autumn/Winter 1995)

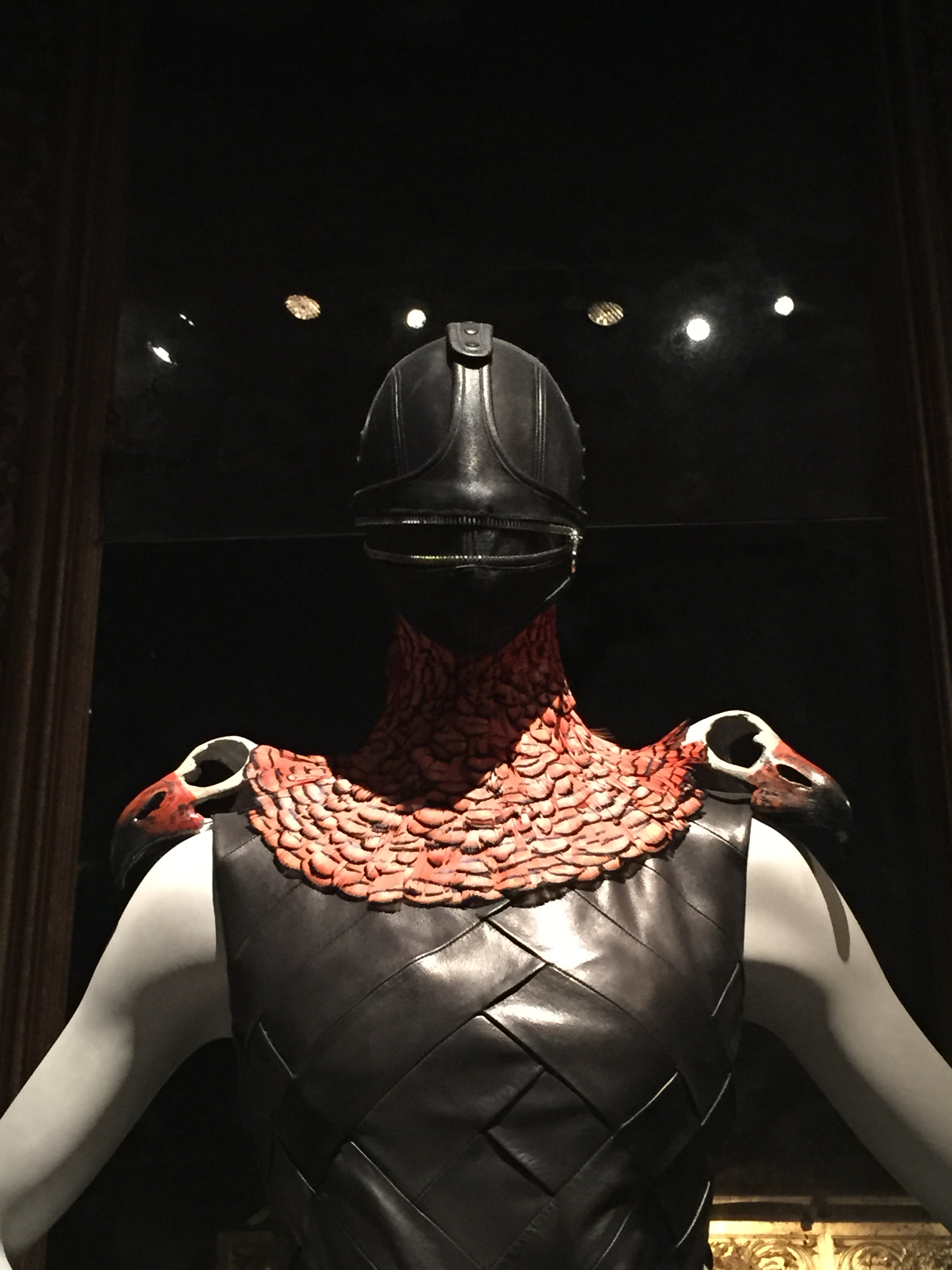
Dress with mask from Eclect/Dissect (Autumn/Winter 1997) for Givenchy

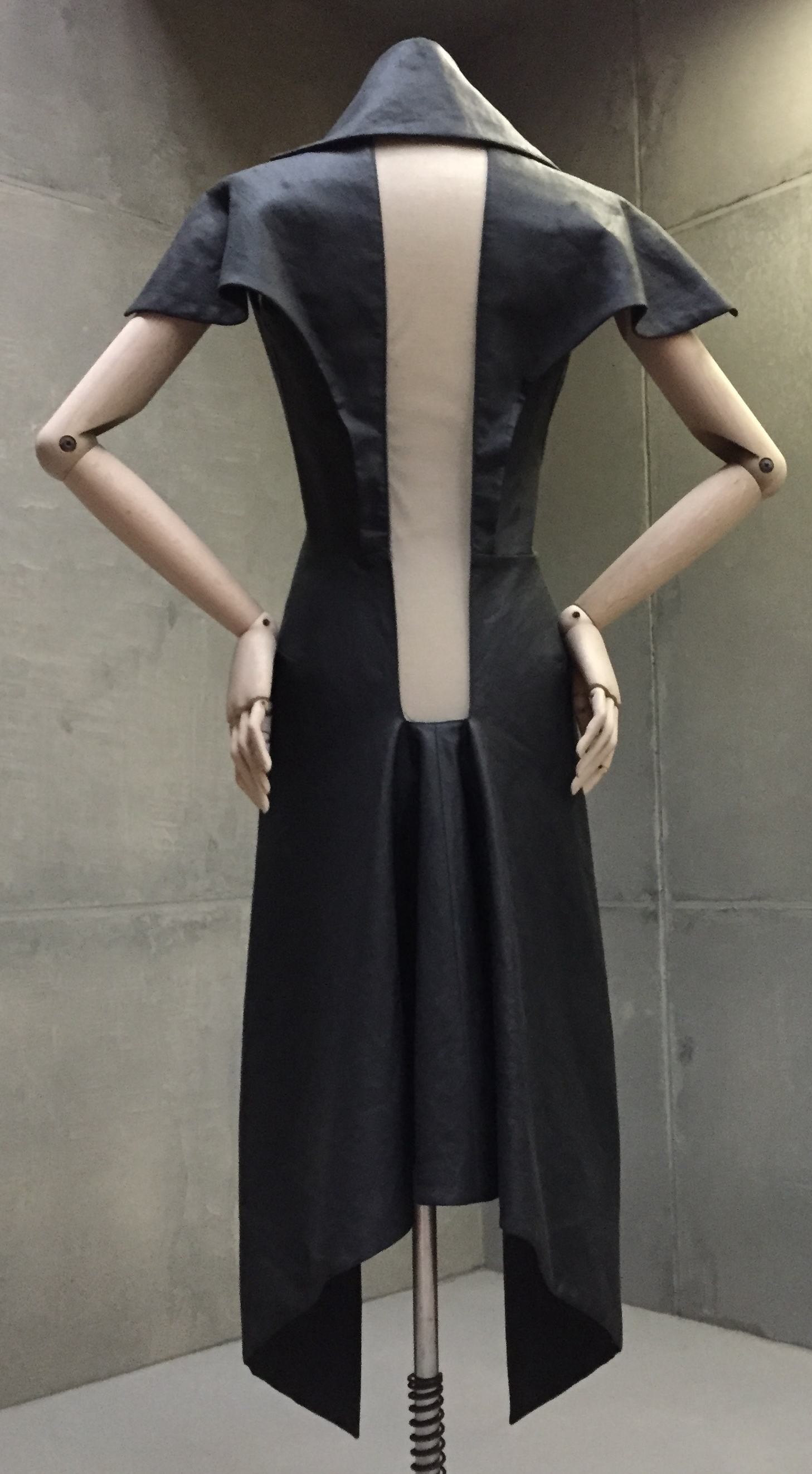
Dress from No. 13 (Spring/Summer 1999)

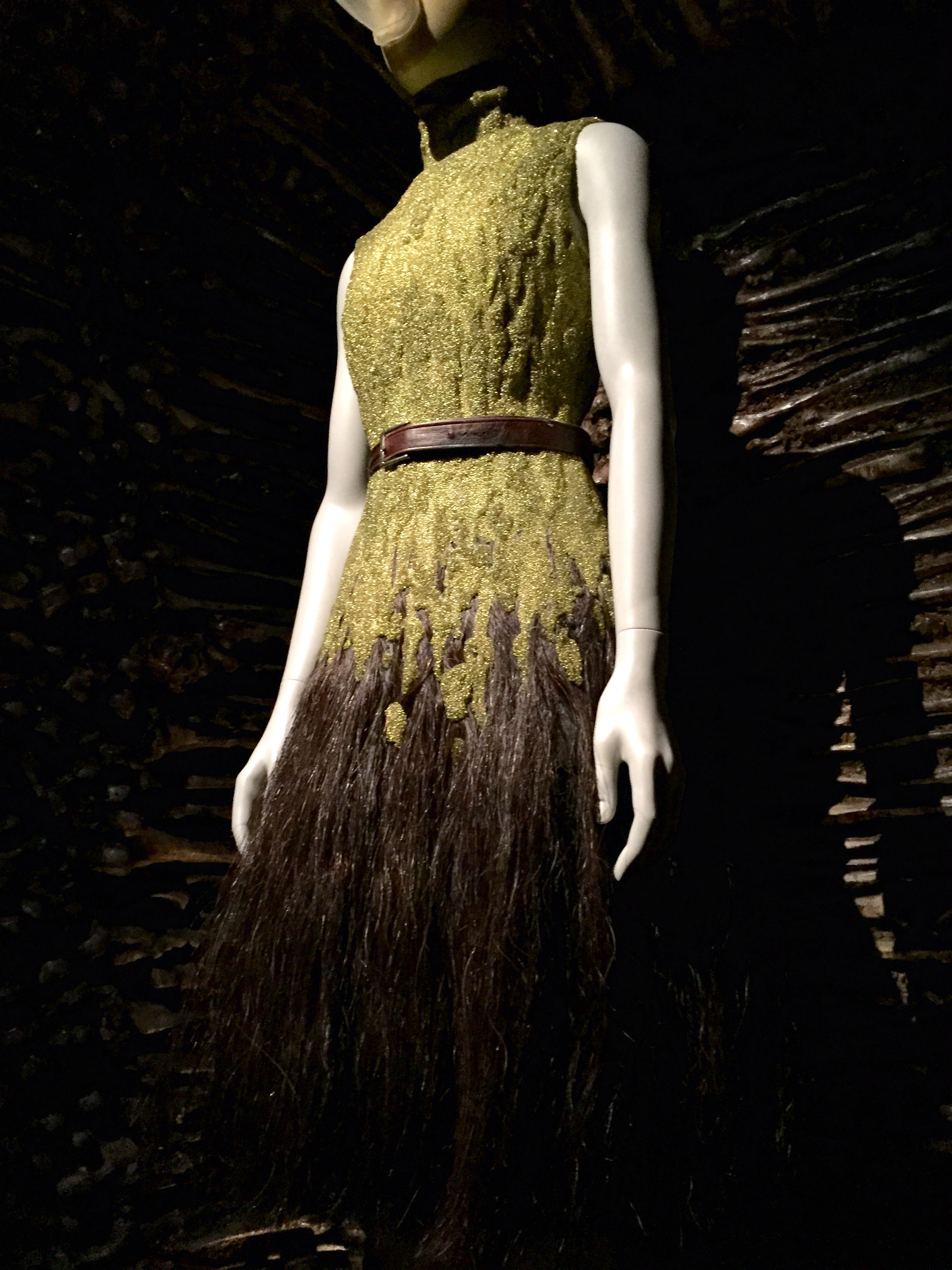
Dress from Eshu (Autumn/Winter 2000)

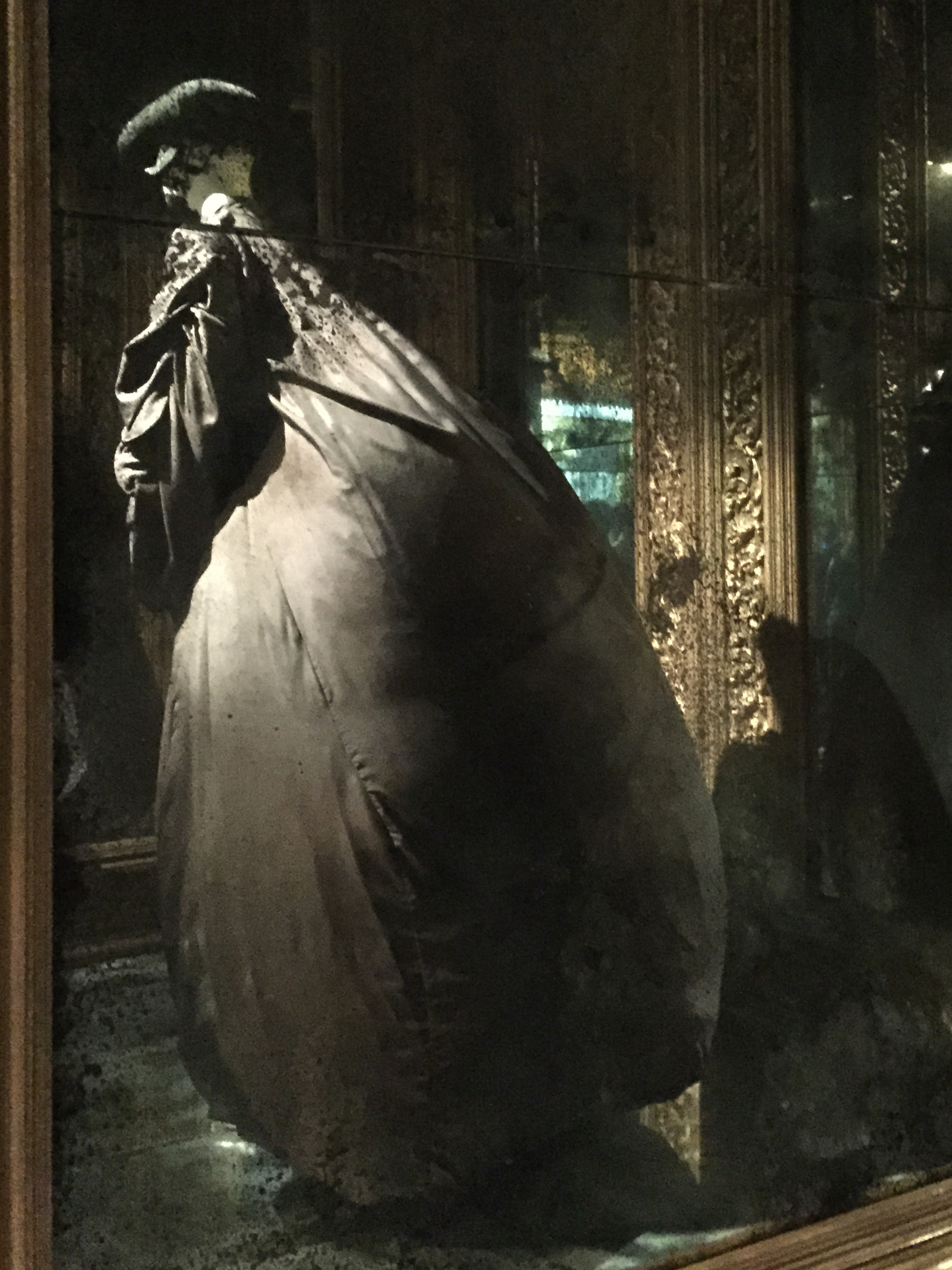
"Highwayman" outfit from Supercalifragilisticexpialidocious (Autumn/Winter 2002)

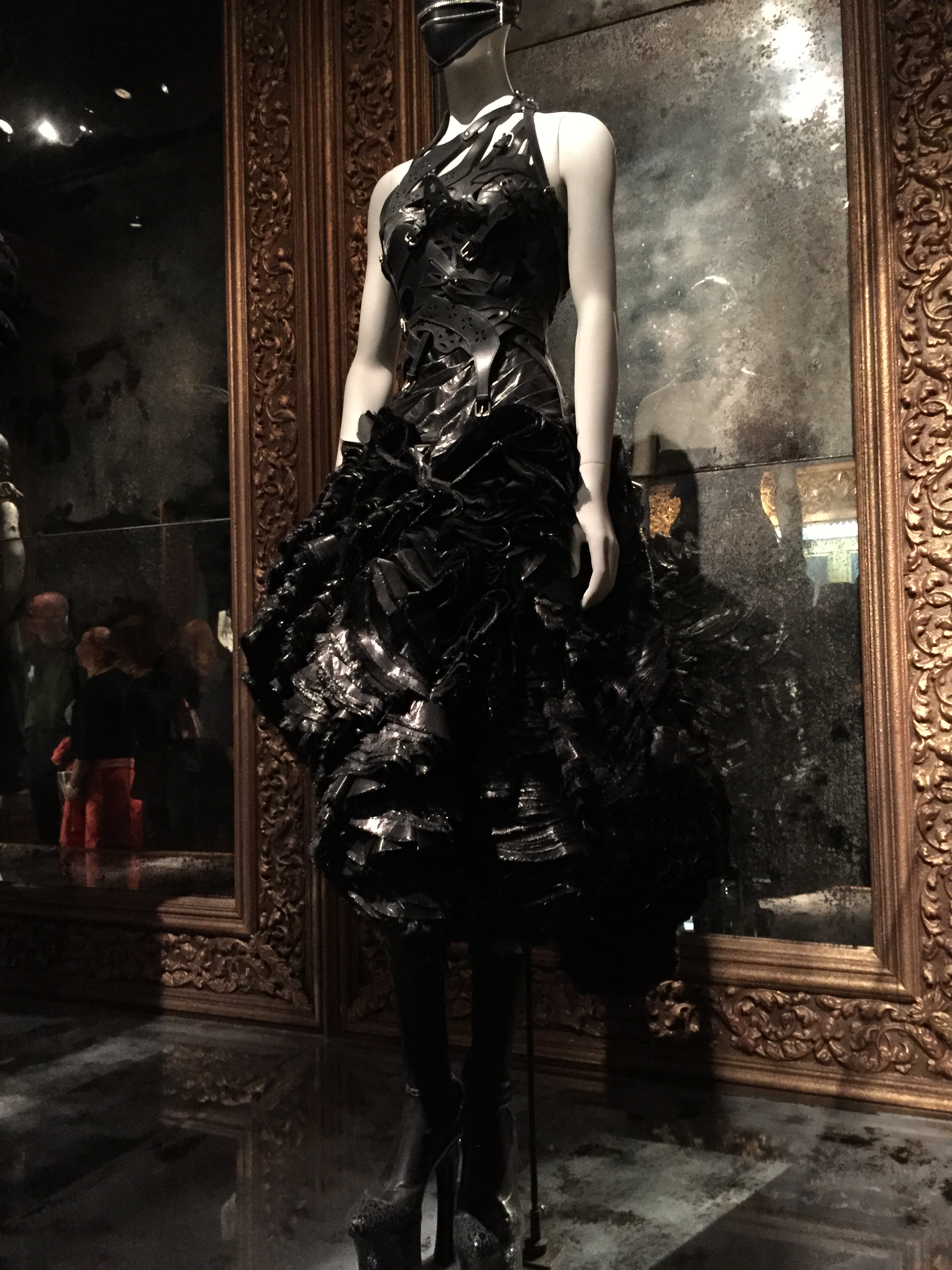
Rubbish-styled dress from The Horn of Plenty (Autumn/Winter 2009)

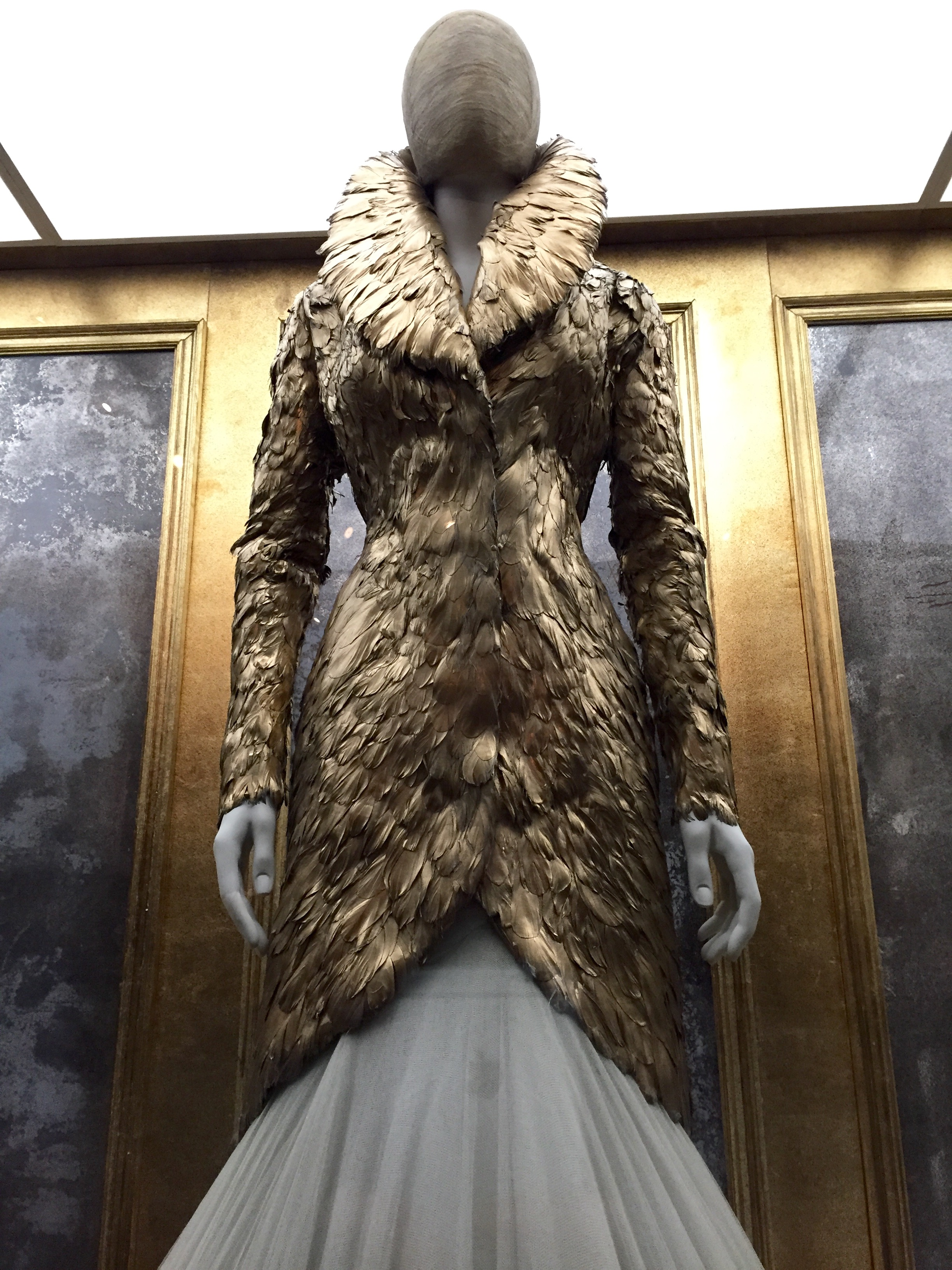
Dress from Angels and Demons (Autumn/Winter 2010), McQueen's final collection
