= It's a Jungle Out There (collection) =

1997 fashion collection by Alexander McQueen

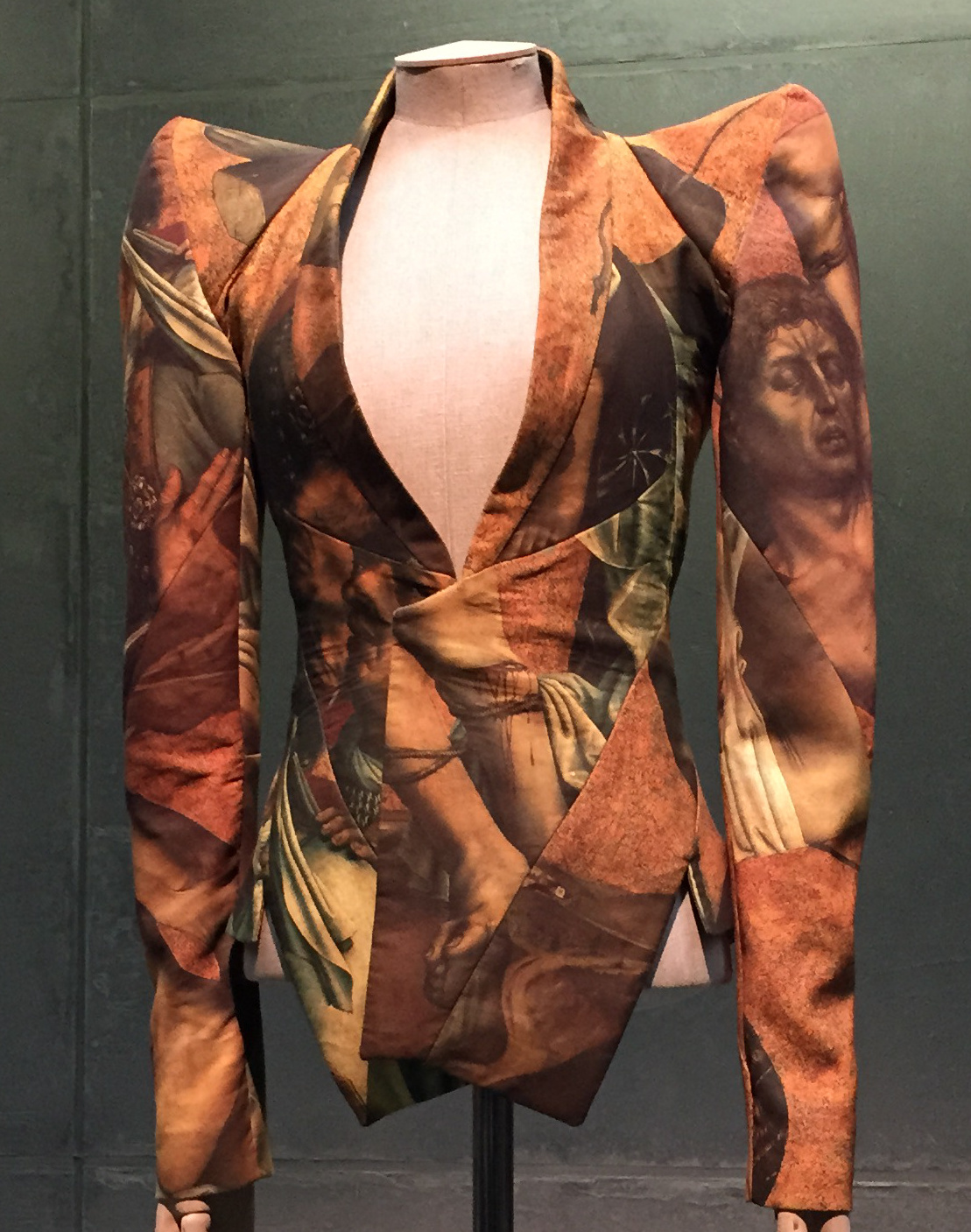
Jacket from the It's a Jungle Out There collection, Savage Beauty, V&A

It's a Jungle Out There is the tenth collection by British fashion designer Alexander McQueen, released for the Autumn/Winter 1997 season of his eponymous fashion house. The collection was presented at the Borough Market (Southwark, London) in February 1997 and it featured a total of 75 looks inspired by Thomson's gazelle. Fur, silk, leather and acid-washed denim were used for the confection of the garments; additionally, some of the pieces featured antlers and taxidermy crocodile heads, human hair and iron jewellery. Acclaimed by the press, this collection restated McQueen as one of the leading figures in fashion after his highly criticized debut with Givenchy. In 2011, several pieces were displayed in the exhibition dedicated to the designer's career, Alexander McQueen: Savage Beauty, at the Metropolitan Museum of Art in New York and, in 2015, at the Victoria and Albert Museum in London.

== Background ==
=== Givenchy's debut: Search for the Golden Fleece ===
After the announcement that Alexander McQueen would replace John Galliano as the creative director of Givenchy was made in October 1996, McQueen started to work on what it would be his first collection with the French couture house. McQueen and his team created a collection of 55 looks in 25 days; he found inspiration for the collection in Givenchy's logo and used the myth of "Jason and the Argonauts" to develop the entire concept. The collection, Search for the Golden Fleece (Spring/Summer 1997), was presented at the École des Beaux-Arts in Paris on January 19, 1997, as part of the Paris Fashion Week. The garments were made in white and gold (as Givenchy's label colours), but in the words of the British designer:

The reason I did that [a collection all of white and gold] is that there had to be a major break between me and John Galliano; because John has got such a… you know, a vision of his own. For me to take over, I wanted it to be a complete break. And another reason why we did the whole collection in white and gold was, I mean, I feel… you know, I regretted it after, but I wanted to change the look so quickly, so fast, to break a complete look from Galliano to McQueen and, the reason we did it in white was that the people could choose the colours, so we gave them a blank page to work on and just the structure. But fashion people are not that intelligent, they want to see all the colours all the time. You know, if you tell them "I give you a blank page, choose your colour, chose your fabric," they are not intelligent to do that; I learned that fast.

— A. McQueen

The pieces displayed McQueen's precise structures. Most of the pieces were made of white and golden fabrics, some of them included details of golden embroidery or bone feathers. The models exhibited big hairstyles in the shape of horns and butterfly wings, at times, decorated with headdresses or jewellery. The reaction was mostly negative; The New York Times qualified the collection as "vulgar" and "hostile". The French fashion editors criticized the election of McQueen as the creative director of Givenchy while the British press defended McQueen's work; The Independent stated that the designer "made a brave and admirable move". The collection has been considered a "failure" in McQueen's career, even the British designer confessed that he felt it "unsuccessful" for himself.

== Concept and creative process ==
In the midst of the controversy created by his Givenchy debut, McQueen found the inspiration for his next collection in nature; "I get a lot of inspiration from nature itself, it comes a lot in my work really; I mean, it is a big aesthetic for me so, I work on that a lot". In that aesthetic, McQueen found an analogy between his experience with the press after the Givenchy debut and nature in the Thomson's gazelle. According to Simon Costin, set designer for McQueen's shows, "his mood boards were covered with blow-ups of images of National Geographic of gazelles being torn apart by lions".

The whole show's feeling was about Thomson's Gazelle; it is a poor little creature. Their markings are lovely; It has got these dark eyes, and the white belly with the black lines, tan and the horns in the back. But it is the food chain on Africa, as soon as it is born is dead; I mean you're lucky if it lasts a few months. And that's how I see human life, in the same way, you know, we all can be discarded quite easily and, nothing depicts it more honestly than the way animals are. And, I was trying also say the fragility of a designer's time in the press, you're there, you're gone; It's a jungle out there!

— A. McQueen

The collection was crafted between January and February 1997, in McQueen's studio in London. The designer intended to take the toughness and irreverence of McQueen's London, in opposition to the wealthy and elegant atmosphere of Givenchy. According to Sebastian Pons, his design assistant at the time: " I walked to his London studio and he was talking of an haute couture show, "I tried to please them and I fucked it up so I'm going to do my own thing". For the creation of the garments, McQueen applied classic patterns to "street-wear fabrics", resulting on leather and denim frock coats. He also experimented with structures, creating higher and wider shoulders, irregular cuts and sharp tailoring. He also added taxidermy pieces as crocodile heads or antelope alters; some of the pieces had hair stuck to it: "The idea of this piece is that a beast has eaten a lovely blond girl and she is trying to get out" (Alexander McQueen the works ). Some of the pieces included prints of Robert Campin's The Bad Thief to the Left of Christ, 1430.

== The runway show ==
=== Setting ===
The show was set in the Borough Market, which, according to Simon Costin, was a "rough" area at the time. Costin used the galleries of the market as the catwalk and built an iron backdrop with fake bullet holes to create a gritty atmosphere; he found inspiration for this idea in the ending scene of Arthur Penn's Bonnie and Clyde. Bashed-up cars were installed, along with heaters and bleachers at the sides of the catwalk. The whole budget for the show was $100.000, and a group of 100 helpers was needed to build the set. Simon Chauduoir, who was in charge of the lighting and sound, used red lightning to create a sinister atmosphere during the previous moments of the show's beginning and used faint lightning during the show with degradation, to resemble fabric's dye. The show included music from Armand van Helden "Witch Doktor" and Kool and the Gang "Jungle Boogie", lion roars were also used for the show.

=== The collection: stylistic aspects ===
The hair and makeup were created to make the models look like animals. The markings of Thompson's gazelle's eyes were recreated, and some models wore white contact lenses, intending to make them look more "animalistic". The hairstyles were mostly influenced by mullet or mohawk style, dyed as gazelle's markings, and some of them included shapes that resembled animal ears. Most of the fabrics used in this show were fur, leather and silk, although cotton was used in the pieces with Campin's painting prints. Some of the looks included pieces of jewellery like iron horns, hands and claws. The model Stella Tennant opened the show wearing a black leather dress with patterned floral shapes cut over the fabric, leather gloves and iron jewellery which covered her cheekbones, so the light made her face resemble a Thompson's gazelle. The collection would include pieces like acid-washed denim coats and jeans, leather tailoring jackets, silk dresses and tops, etc. In some cases, the clothes mixed different fabrics, as the piece worn by Jaime King, which was made of brown leather and denim; it also included crocodile taxidermy in the shoulders. There were fur dresses and see-through pieces, with human hair attached. The show closed with the models Debra Shaw, wearing a pony-skin jacket with impala horns over the shoulders, and Alek Wek wearing a dark fur coat with a golden necklace.

=== Curiosities ===
During the show, the pile of crashed cars was set on fire after a group of people destroyed the barricades, trying to get in made the heaters fall. According to Debra Shaw, "Had that not been rectified, that whole tent, all the top fashion editors and models would have been history". Despite the risks, McQueen did not stop the show and kept sending the models out to the catwalk.

One of the models arrived late and was fired. During the years, numerous McQueen biographers have pointed out that the model was Naomi Campbell.

The women's wear got stuck in customs at Heathrow Airport 48 hours before the show. Katy England, McQueen's stylist, left the studio by night and came back in the early morning with the pieces. They spent 24 hours working on the pieces to get them ready for the show.

== Legacy ==
The collection has been remembered as the one that reaffirmed McQueen's figure as one of the most important designers of the 1990s. In 2011, some of the pieces that were part of this collection were used in the retrospective exhibition Alexander McQueen: Savage Beauty; among them, the piece worn by Jaime King, the jacket worn by Debra Shaw and the necklace of Alek Wek.
