= Nihilism (collection) =

1994 fashion collection by Alexander McQueen

Look 23 from the Nihilism runway show, photographed by Robert Fairer, from Alexander McQueen: Unseen

Nihilism is the third collection by British designer Alexander McQueen, released for the Spring/Summer 1994 season of his eponymous fashion house. McQueen developed the collection following the launch of his own label with Taxi Driver, which was exhibited in March 1993 at the Ritz Hotel in London in lieu of a fashion show. An eclectic collection with no straightforward theme, Nihilism pushed back against dominant womenswear trends with its hard tailoring, and aggressive, sexualised styling. It was created in collaboration with McQueen's associates Simon Ungless and Fleet Bigwood. Like Taxi Driver, Nihilism included experimental techniques, silhouettes, and materials, such as dresses made from cellophane, stained with clay, or adorned with dead locusts.

Nihilism was McQueen's first professional runway show. The British Fashion Council provided backing; it was the first time they had done so for a new designer. It was staged during London Fashion Week on 18 October 1993 at the Bluebird Garage, which had a reputation as a hub for drug use and criminal activity. The styling was intended to be provocative and disturbing. The clothing was highly sexualised: thin fabric that exposed the skin underneath, or garments cut to expose breasts and vulvas. McQueen's signature bumster trousers, whose extremely low waist exposed the top of the intergluteal cleft, made their first runway appearance in Nihilism. Models were styled to look filthy and aggressive, with inspiration from the punk subculture, and were encouraged to act belligerently on the runway.

The collection received mixed reviews. Journalists had a difficult time deciding what to make of it. Many accused McQueen of misogyny for presenting such extreme designs; the claim persisted throughout his career, although he consistently objected to it. McQueen returned to many of the ideas he explored in Nihilism throughout his lifetime, especially the interplay of sexuality and violence. Three items from Nihilism appeared in the retrospective exhibit Alexander McQueen: Savage Beauty.

== Background ==
British fashion designer Alexander McQueen was known for his imaginative, sometimes controversial designs, and dramatic fashion shows. Over the course of his career, which lasted from 1992 until his death in 2010, he explored a broad range of ideas and themes, particularly sexuality, death, violence, romanticism, and historicism. The son of a London taxicab driver and a teacher, he grew up in one of the poorer neighbourhoods in London's East End. During childhood, he witnessed his sisters experiencing domestic violence at the hands of their husbands, which became a formative influence on his designs.

As a young apprentice on Savile Row, McQueen earned a reputation as an expert tailor. In 1992, he graduated with a master's degree in fashion design from Central Saint Martins (CSM), a London art school. McQueen met a number of his future collaborators at CSM, including Simon Ungless, with whom he later lived. His graduation collection, Jack the Ripper Stalks His Victims, was bought in its entirety by magazine editor Isabella Blow, who became his mentor and his muse.

McQueen wanted to work for an existing fashion brand rather than assume the risk of founding his own, but friends persuaded him to present a collection for the Autumn/Winter 1993 season at London Fashion Week. McQueen launched his own label with Taxi Driver, which was exhibited at the Ritz Hotel in London in lieu of a fashion show. The collection was the debut of the bumster trouser, whose extremely low waist exposed the top of the intergluteal cleft, and which became a McQueen brand signature. McQueen had no financial backing at the beginning of his career, so his early collections were created on minimal budgets, using cheap fabric and unconventional materials to make up for the shortfall.

== Concept and collection ==
=== Label ===
Original Alexander McQueen brand logo

Although Taxi Driver had been critically well-received, McQueen was still hesitant about running his own company; it was financially risky and he was afraid to fail. He continued to work on one-off designs, mainly given or sold to friends and acquaintances, while looking for a position. His work at this time was inspired by the prehistoric adventure film Quest for Fire (1981), the 18th century sadomasochistic novel The 120 Days of Sodom, and coverage of natural disasters in National Geographic magazine. He was also influenced by fellow British designers and CSM graduates Hussein Chalayan and John Galliano. McQueen did not have his own studio at the time, so he and Ungless made the items by hand at their shared home in Tooting. Fleet Bigwood, a CSM lecturer, designed and produced prints for him. Alice Smith, a friend who did early promotional work for McQueen, conceived a logo for him, sketched by her boyfriend. Neither was ever paid, which Smith later said she forgave him for. The design – McQueen's name with the lower-case "c" within the upper-case "Q" – became the official brand logo.

McQueen's biographers Dana Thomas and Andrew Wilson conflict on where the idea to present a Spring/Summer 1994 collection originated. Thomas reports that McQueen was still hesitant to strike out on his own, and had to be persuaded to present a proper fashion show by his friends and mentors. In contrast, Wilson quotes McQueen's friend Seta Niland – then working at fashion magazine The Face – as saying that McQueen "kept banging on about producing a collection". In Niland's telling, it was she who was hesitant, asking McQueen how they would afford to put on a fashion show with no money and no backing. In either case, the decision was made.

=== Collection ===
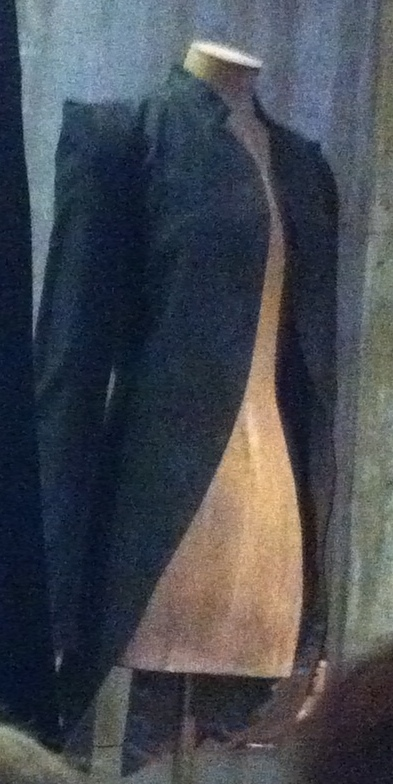
Jacket from Nihilism presented at Alexander McQueen: Savage Beauty (2011 staging)

Nihilism was an eclectic collection without a straightforward theme. It pushed back against the dominant mode for womenswear at the time, which author Judith Watt described as "anti-hard chic and antitailoring". Thomas wrote that the name came from a theme of "anti-Romanticism". Wilson called it "heroin chic". It featured a degree of primitivism. McQueen later said of the collection: "It was a reaction to designers romanticizing ethnic dressing, like a Masai-inspired dress made of materials the Masai could never afford." McQueen was already well known by then for his sharp tailoring, which appeared in the form of tightly-fitted suit jackets paired with slim trousers, including low-cut bumsters. There were historicist elements in the form of draped neo-classical dresses, references to les merveilleuses, and the Arts and Crafts movement. Some long jackets could be described as "Edwardian", including one with turned-up cuffs.

Like Taxi Driver before it, Nihilism made heavy use of cheap fabric and unconventional materials. There were skirts and dresses made from clear plastic wrap. One latex dress was covered in dead locusts, inspired by a National Geographic article about a famine in Africa caused by the insects. Another item came about more serendipitously: during production, Ungless accidentally spilled a can of liquid latex onto a drain cover with a grid pattern. McQueen tossed glitter into it and they used it as the front panel of a dress. Bigwood recalled McQueen telling him to "disrespect" a particular piece of cheap fabric which had been covered with gold lustre; Bigwood says he "threw every chemical I had in my studio at it". The fabric was turned into a frock coat.

Many of the garments were distressed with paint or mud for effect. One cellophane dress was covered with rust-coloured paint mimicking bloodstains, while another dress was screen printed with a paste of resin and actual rust. Other garments had hand prints or smears in fake blood over the breast area; Watt suggested a possible reference to Saint Agatha, a Catholic saint whose breasts were amputated during her martyrdom. According to Ungless, McQueen was somewhat "obsessed" with Chalayan's degree collection, The Tangent Flows, which had featured dresses buried for weeks to distress them, and sought to outdo it. He cut several dresses from white chiffon, sprayed them with mud made from red clay, and left them hanging outside for weeks. The clay left the dresses stained rust red, with chips of clay embedded in the fabric.

The clothing was highly sexualised: thin fabric that exposed the skin underneath, or garments cut to expose midriffs, breasts, and vulvas. Signature sharp tailoring, including the return of the bumster trousers. The intent of the bumsters was to elongate the torso and expose the base of the spine, which McQueen felt was the most erotic spot on the human body regardless of gender. Watt suggests that the bumsters may have been inspired by 16th century tailoring, in which men's trousers were cut to sit very low on the hips; McQueen owned a copy of The Tailor's Pattern Book, a 1589 book of patterns by Spanish mathematician Juan de Alcega.

== Runway show ==
=== Production details ===
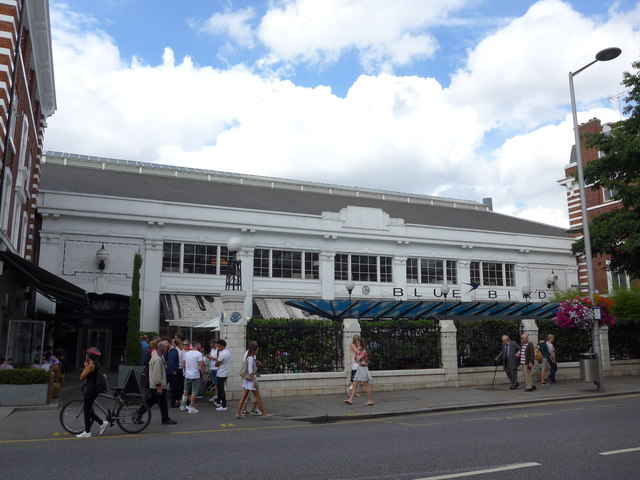
Bluebird Garage in London, 2014

Nihilism was McQueen's first professional runway show. The British Fashion Council provided some backing; it was the first time they had done so for a new designer. Nonetheless, their budget was so low that Niland recalled the main part of her role as "stylist" for the show being one of talking people into providing free things for them. She described lying to the owners of the venue, the Bluebird Garage, to secure their reservation. At the time, the Bluebird had a reputation as a hub for drug use and criminal activity. Cultural theorist Per Strömberg described the choice of location as emblematic of the "underground and somehow underdog approach" of London Fashion Week. Invitations were made from pages torn out of an old encyclopaedia and hand-stamped with the show details. Lighting, seating, and promotion were all provided by unpaid friends of friends. Even the models worked for free, as they were mainly signed on through Niland's industry contacts. McQueen's friend Chris Bird recalled them "throwing the clothes into bags" to take home in lieu of payment.

Niland handled overall styling, with make-up by Lisa Butler. A contemporary newspaper quotes Colin Roy as the hairdresser, but in the Robert Fairer and Claire Wilcox book Alexander McQueen Unseen, they list Eugene Souleiman and Barnabé. The soundtrack, largely consisting of grunge, punk, and house music interspersed with silence, was arranged by Niland. Selected tracks included "Creep" by Radiohead, "Pretend We're Dead" by L7, "I Wanna Get High" by Cypress Hill, and Nirvana songs. Niland recalled McQueen being angered by her use of "Creep". According to her, he did not understand that the choice was intended to be ironic, a boast that despite being an outsider, he had talent worth recognising.

=== Catwalk presentation ===
The show was staged on 18 October 1993, and was the final presentation for that year's London Fashion Week. There was a great deal of anticipation about the show before it opened. Katie Grand, then the fashion director for culture magazine Dazed and Confused, described it as "one of those nineties happenings where no one quite knew what we were going to see". There was very little seating, so most of the audience – about 300 people, mostly Central Saint Martins students and some fashion journalists – stood. McQueen's mother and Isabella Blow were seated in the front row. The show started 30 minutes late.

There was so much repression in London fashion. It had to be livened up ... my job was to produce ideas.

— Alexander McQueen, quoted in Isabella Blow: A Life in Fashion

The aesthetic for the runway show was intended to be provocative and disturbing, with styling that emphasised the thin fabric and revealing silhouettes. Some items were made to appear wet to the point of translucency, in the manner of a wet T-shirt. This echoed an effect Galliano had employed for his collection Fallen Angels (Spring/Summer 1986). Many models were wrapped in cling film because McQueen and Niland realised at the last minute that there was no budget to purchase underwear for them. The low-cut bumster trousers appeared on the runway for the first time in Nihilism. Niland had to talk the models into wearing them, as they were so extreme for the time. She said the effect "was gorgeous, but a huge risk." One model had black pants that were slit from waist to hem in the back, exposing red lining along with the model's entire lower body. Another walked bare-breasted, covering herself "with bloodstained hands". One androgynous-looking male model walked the runway shirtless to "shock guests with the gender confusion", as Thomas put it.

The models were styled to look filthy and aggressive, with inspiration from the punk subculture. Some were smeared with what appeared to be mud or blood. Makeup was used to give a hollowed look to their eyes. Hair was streaked with red and "pinned up haphazardly" or styled into Mohican haircuts. (Note: "Mohican haircut" is the British term for a haircut usually referred to as a "Mohawk haircut" in American English.) Hairdresser Colin Roy described achieving this effect using "sumo wax", an imported product used to style the distinctive topknots of sumo wrestlers. The models were encouraged to act aggressively, giving the show what curator Claire Wilcox described as a "threatening mood". Some made obscene gestures such as the finger toward the audience.

== Reception ==
McQueen, who is 24 and from London's East End, has a view that speaks of battered women, of violent lives, of grinding daily existences offset by wild, drug-enhanced nocturnal dives into clubs where the dress code is semi-naked. As such, his clothes probably speak with more accuracy about real life than some swoosh of an evening gown by Valentino.

— Marion Hume, "McQueen's theatre of cruelty", The Independent, 10 February 1993

Reception to Nihilism was mixed. The journalists in attendance were unsure what to make of the show; apparently many photographers were so disturbed they stopped taking pictures partway through. Dana Thomas reports that those who were present wrote a great deal about it, to a degree she felt was unusual for a designer presenting his first show. Many of these reviewers accused McQueen of misogyny for presenting such extreme designs; the claim persisted throughout his career, although he consistently objected to it.

=== Marion Hume review ===
Marion Hume wrote a full-page review for The Independent which opened by declaring that "Alexander McQueen's debut was a horror show". She called out the macabre styling, saying it was "rather a lot to take in the name of frocks", but explained that she stayed to watch because she felt McQueen had "something new to say" and "has an assured view of fashion". Hume lauded McQueen's tailoring skills and the way he used "traditional skills in a new way". She concluded that tolerating shocking newness was necessary to allow London's fashion industry "to keep its creative supremacy".

Other authors have commented on Hume's review. Andrew Wilson felt that Hume was, despite her criticism, interested in McQueen's innovation and novelty. Curator Kate Bethune concurred somewhat. Evans argued that Hume was too focused on the disturbing styling while failing to notice "the historical eclecticism which also permeated the show". Judith Watt also criticised Hume's review for leaning on class stereotypes with its emphasis on McQueen's "East End" origins.

=== Other reviews ===
Much of the British press ignored Nihilism. Major fashion publications such as Vogue and Women's Wear Daily also did not report on it.

For The New York Times, Amy Spindler described the collection as a standout among a crowd of "squeaky-clean" designs. She highlighted the jackets and frock coats for their sharp cuts and sculpted silhouettes. Although she felt it was "a hard show to take", she wrote that it was the only show that season that displayed any of the "aggressive British attitude" she and others had expected to see. In contrast, Virginia Leeming at the Vancouver Sun thought most designers had produced shocking and theatrical collections that season, putting McQueen's horror stylings more in line with the crowd. Like Spindler, she highlighted the tailoring of the frock coats. A staff writer at the Huddersfield Daily Examiner called out the sexualised designs as a daring way to get attention, joking that one model "forgot to wear anything underneath" her transparent dress.

At the Welsh Daily Post, a staff writer called McQueen the "wild man" of the fashion season for his daring designs, and felt that this, combined with his technical skills would hopefully enable him to flourish in the difficult fashion industry. In advance of McQueen's next show, Banshee (Autumn/Winter 1994), Kathryn Samuel from The Daily Telegraph looked back at Nihilism, arguing that McQueen's creativity and talent for tailoring had been apparent despite the grotesque styling and his obvious inexperience. She quoted McQueen as saying he had wanted to "give London a kick" with Nihilism, but planned for Banshee to be more commercially viable. She felt he deserved financial backing, but was uncertain about whether he could restrain himself to the degree that would require. The Drapers Record reviewer complained that it was "not worth the hour wait", aside from some tailored items.

Although the show was not explicitly derived from cinematic influences, as many later shows were, several reviewers drew connections to media regardless. David Hayes of the Evening Standard argued that horror films, such as Carrie (1976) and those made by Hammer Film Productions, must have been an influence. The Observer described the gold-painted frock coat as "based on the torn layers of a billboard".

== Analysis ==
This collection set the tone for others over the next few years. Their mood was doomy and lost, savage and melancholic, yet also darkly romantic. In them McQueen developed an aesthetic of cruelty culled from disparate sources: the work of sixteenth- and seventeenth- century anatomists, in particular that of Andreas Vesalius; the photography of Joel-Peter Witkin from the 1980s and 90s; and the films of Pasolini, Kubrick, Buñuel and Hitchcock.

— Caroline Evans, Fashion at the Edge: Spectacle, Modernity and Deathliness

Kate Bethune argued that McQueen's primary intent with the collection was to build his brand. She identified the appearance of McQueen's logo on the front of a white dress as an element of this effort. Andrew Groves, a fellow designer and early boyfriend of McQueen's, believed that McQueen's shock tactics were intended to secure the press attention that would draw him a financial backer. Fashion theorist Caroline Evans agreed, arguing that McQueen's shows became less aggressive and more purely theatrical after he secured backing.

Rebecca Arnold analysed the interplay of sexuality and brutality in fashion for Fashion Theory in 1999. She identified Nihilism, whose models appeared to be "victims of some terrible violence or surgery", as an example of how McQueen had relied on this contradictory aesthetic from the earliest stages of his career. She wrote: "Themes of anxiety and distress continue to be combined with a latent sexuality in his work," pointing out visuals which evoked similar feelings from The Hunger (Spring/Summer 1996).

The accusation that McQueen was a misogynist persisted throughout much of his career, despite his objections. McQueen's early friends and collaborators recalled that his intent with his early collections, including Nihilism, was to make women feel empowered. Bobby Hillson, who mentored McQueen at CSM, thought the issue was that McQueen was "not particularly articulate" with expressing his ideas at that stage of his career. Alice Smith, who did early promotional work for McQueen, recalled him telling her that he wanted women wearing his clothing "to feel strong and powerful". Groves and another friend, Nicholas "Trixie" Townsend, recalled that McQueen had designed for women who were confident, androgynous "outsiders" and who frequented the same gay clubs that he did.

== Legacy ==
McQueen returned to the combination of tightly-fitted jackets over bumster trousers throughout his career. He is generally credited with sparking a global trend for low-rise pants via the bumsters. His next few shows were styled with a similar blend of aggression and sexuality, inspired by his favourite artists; press coverage for these continued to be mostly appalled, although his work garnered some approval among the criticism.

Isabella Blow was photographed for Dazed and Confused in McQueen's designs for Nihilism following the show. The Daily Telegraph reported that McQueen had sold 200 pieces from Nihilism by February 1994, although Thomas clarified in her 2015 book Gods and Kings that this represented orders from retailers rather than consumer sales. Further, she reports that since McQueen did not have a contract with any manufacturer, the orders went unfulfilled.

Tiina Laakkonen, an early supporter of McQueen's, lent three items from Nihilism to the retrospective exhibition Alexander McQueen: Savage Beauty: a black jacket in silk and cotton, and a pair of trousers and a jacket in grey silk and wool.

== Bibliography ==
- Arnold, Rebecca (November 1999). "The Brutalized Body". Fashion Theory. 3 (4): 497. doi:10.2752/136270499779476072. ISSN 1362-704X. Archived from the original on 22 April 2024.
- Bolton, Andrew (2011). Alexander McQueen: Savage Beauty. New York City: Metropolitan Museum of Art. ISBN 978-1-58839-412-5. OCLC 687693871.
- Callahan, Maureen (2014). Champagne Supernovas: Kate Moss, Marc Jacobs, Alexander McQueen, and the '90s Renegades Who Remade Fashion. New York City: Touchstone Books. ISBN 978-1-4516-4053-3.
- Crowe, Lauren Goldstein (2010). Isabella Blow: A Life in Fashion. New York City: Thomas Dunne Books. ISBN 978-1-4299-8538-3.
- Elenowitz-Hess, Caroline (April 2022). "Reckoning with Highland Rape: Sexuality, Violence, and Power on the Runway". Fashion Theory. 26 (3): 400. doi:10.1080/1362704X.2020.1846325. ISSN 1362-704X. S2CID 229432510.
- English, Bonnie; Munroe, Nazanin Hedayat (2022). A Cultural History of Western Fashion: From Haute Couture to Virtual Couture (3rd ed.). London: Bloomsbury Visual Arts. ISBN 978-1-350-15091-1.
- Evans, Caroline (2003). Fashion at the Edge: Spectacle, Modernity and Deathliness. New Haven, Connecticut: Yale University Press. ISBN 978-0-300-10192-8.
- Fairer, Robert; Wilcox, Claire (2016). Alexander McQueen: Unseen. New Haven, Connecticut: Yale University Press. ISBN 978-0-300-22267-8. OCLC 946216643.
- Fox, Chloe (2012). Vogue On: Alexander McQueen. Vogue on Designers. London: Quadrille Publishing. ISBN 978-1849491136. OCLC 828766756.
- Gleason, Katherine (2012). Alexander McQueen: Evolution. New York City: Race Point Publishing. ISBN 978-1-61058-837-9. OCLC 783147416.
- Homer, Karen (2023). Little Book of Alexander McQueen: The Story of the Iconic Brand. London: Welbeck Publishing Group. ISBN 978-1-80279-270-6.
- Honigman, Ana Finel (2021). What Alexander McQueen Can Teach You About Fashion. London: Frances Lincoln. ISBN 978-0-7112-5906-5.
- Moore, Jennifer Grayer (2015). Fashion Fads through American History: Fitting Clothes into Context. Santa Barbara, California: Greenwood Publishing Group. ISBN 979-8-216-08346-7.
- Mora, Juliana Luna; Berry, Jess (September 2022). "Creative Direction Succession in Luxury Fashion: The Illusion of Immortality at Chanel and Alexander McQueen". Luxury. 9 (2–3): 117–140. doi:10.1080/20511817.2022.2194039. ISSN 2051-1817.
- Strömberg, Per (2021). "Industrial Chic: Fashion Shows in Ready-Made Spaces". In Ferrero-Regis, Tiziana; Lindquist, Marissa (eds.). Staging Fashion. Bloomsbury Visual Arts. pp. 115–129.
- Thomas, Dana (2015). Gods and Kings: The Rise and Fall of Alexander McQueen and John Galliano. New York City: Penguin Publishing. ISBN 978-1-101-61795-3. OCLC 951153602.
- Watt, Judith (2012). Alexander McQueen: The Life and the Legacy. New York City: Harper Design. ISBN 978-1-84796-085-6. OCLC 892706946.
- Wilcox, Claire, ed. (2015). Alexander McQueen. New York City: Abrams Books. ISBN 978-1-4197-1723-9. OCLC 891618596.
  - Bethune, Kate. "Encyclopedia of Collections". In Wilcox (2015), pp. 303–326.
  - Frankel, Susannah. "The Early Years". In Wilcox (2015), pp. 69–79.
  - O'Neill, Alistair. "The Shining and Chic". In Wilcox (2015), pp. 261–280.
- Wilson, Andrew (2015). Alexander McQueen: Blood Beneath the Skin. New York City: Simon and Schuster. ISBN 978-1-4767-7674-3. OCLC 1310585849.
