= List of Alexander McQueen collections =

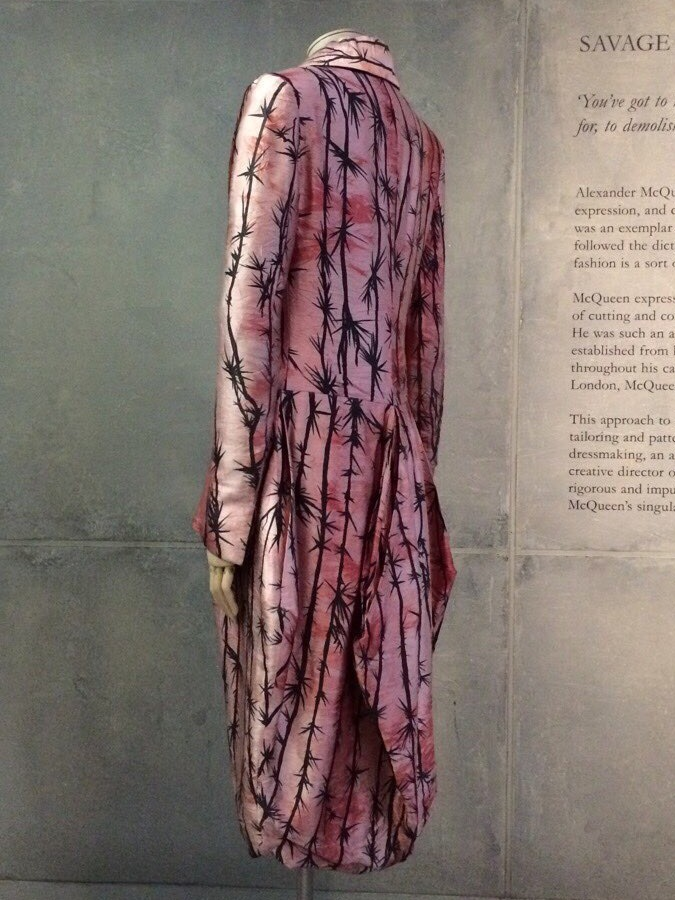
Frock coat from graduation collection, Jack the Ripper Stalks His Victims (1992)

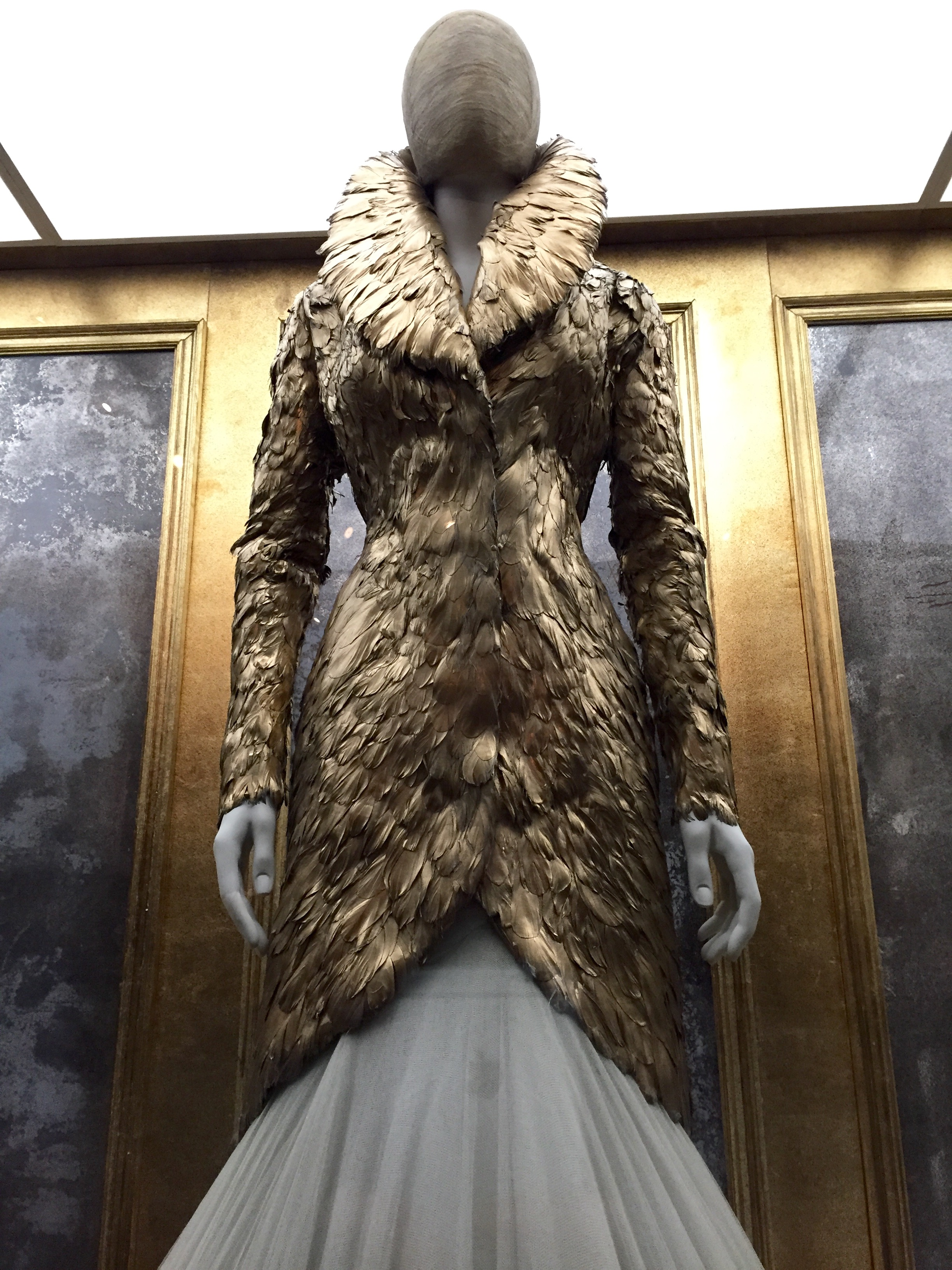
Dress from unfinished final collection Angels and Demons (Autumn/Winter 2010)

British designer Alexander McQueen designed 36 womenswear collections under his eponymous fashion label during a career that lasted from 1992 until his death in 2010. (Note: McQueen's first collection, Jack The Ripper Stalks His Victims, was produced as his graduation thesis for his Master's degree from Central Saint Martins rather than for commercial sale, and some authors do not count it when numbering McQueen's collections.) As a designer, McQueen was known for sharp tailoring, historicism, and imaginative designs that often verged into the controversial. His runway shows were known for being dramatic and theatrical, with some including elements of performance art. McQueen drew inspiration for his clothing and shows from a broad range of sources, including film, history, nature, world religions, art, and his own life. Through his work, he explored themes such as romanticism, sexuality, and death.

He used unusual cuts and silhouettes to play with the human form, making wearers appear inhuman. Early in his career, he originated an extreme low-rise trouser cut called the "bumster", which became a brand signature. Other significant designs include the skull scarf, another brand signature; the oyster dress; and the armadillo shoe, notably worn by singer Lady Gaga.

Womenswear was the focus of McQueen's career. In his early collections, he sometimes presented menswear or had male models walk in the shows, but his label did not have a regular menswear line until 2004. From October 1996 to October 2001, McQueen was – in addition to his responsibilities for his own label – head designer at French fashion house Givenchy, for which he produced both haute couture and ready-to-wear collections each season. This article concerns itself with McQueen's own-label womenswear collections.

== Collections ==
List of collections
Collection	Season	Show date	Show location	Themes and inspiration	Notes
Jack the Ripper Stalks His Victims	1992 graduation collection	16 March 1992	Duke of York's Headquarters, London (Note: Some sources provide a date of July 1992 and list the venue as the Olympia London in Kensington. It is unclear where this originated from, but it appears to be erroneous, as London Fashion Week in 1992 was held in March, and Central Saint Martins holds its graduation shows at Fashion Week.)	London serial killer Jack the Ripper and prostitution in the Victorian era, particularly their practice of selling locks of hair	Thesis collection for Master's degree in fashion at Central Saint Martins; purchased in its entirety by editor Isabella Blow
Taxi Driver	Autumn/Winter 1993	March 1993	The Ritz Hotel, London	Taxi Driver, a 1976 neo-noir film by Martin Scorsese; to a lesser extent McQueen's taxi driver father	Debut of bumster trousers; exhibited rather than shown on runway; (Note: Because of a slumping economy, few designers presented runway shows during London Fashion Week 1993. The British Fashion Council provided funding for six new designers, including McQueen, to exhibit their collections at The Ritz in lieu of runway shows.) no pieces survive as entire collection was accidentally lost immediately following the exhibit
Nihilism	Spring/Summer 1994	18 October 1993	Bluebird Garage, London	Eclectic collection with no straightforward theme, elements of primitivism, pushback against feminine womenswear	First professional catwalk show
Banshee	Autumn/Winter 1994	26 February 1994	Café de Paris, London	The Gaelic banshee, a spirit whose wailing foretells death; darkly romanticised idea of resilience through tragedy	Isabella Blow walked as a model; show was reprised for New York Fashion Week at the behest of fashion promoter Derek Anderson
The Birds	Spring/Summer 1995	10 September 1994	Bagley's warehouse, London	The Birds, a 1963 natural horror film by Alfred Hitchcock; ornithology; the mathematical designs of graphic artist M. C. Escher	First McQueen show styled by long-time collaborator Katy England
Highland Rape	Autumn/Winter 1995	13 March 1995	Natural History Museum, London	English violence towards Scotland, especially the Jacobite risings and the Highland Clearances	First critically-significant collection, led to 1996 hiring by Givenchy
The Hunger	Spring/Summer 1996	23 October 1995	Natural History Museum, London	The Hunger, a 1983 erotic horror film featuring vampires	First time McQueen showed menswear; first show produced by Sam Gainsbury, who would produce every subsequent show
Dante	Autumn/Winter 1996	1 March 1996	Christ Church, Spitalfields, London	Religion and warfare; named for Dante's Inferno, a 14th-century epic poem describing Hell	First appearance of English supermodel Kate Moss in a McQueen show
Bellmer La Poupée	Spring/Summer 1997	27 September 1996	Royal Horticultural Hall, London	Poupée, a 1934 series by surrealist photographer Hans Bellmer, which presented deconstructed dolls as a commentary on Nazi ideals	First show worked by Sarah Burton, who became McQueen's right-hand woman; Black model Debra Shaw walked while shackled to a metal frame, generating controversy
It's a Jungle Out There	Autumn/Winter 1997	27 February 1997	Borough Market, London	Life cycle of the Thomson's gazelle; savagery of the fashion industry; paintings by the Old Masters	Set accidentally caught fire during the show
Untitled	Spring/Summer 1998	28 September 1997	Gatliff Road Warehouse, London	Metamorphosis; brutality; contrast of McQueen's work at his own label and at Givenchy	Originally titled The Golden Shower in reference to the sex act and retitled after objections from sponsor American Express
Joan	Autumn/Winter 1998	25 February 1998	Gatliff Road Warehouse, London	Martyrdom and persecution in the medieval era, especially that of French folk heroine and saint Joan of Arc	McQueen was photographed for The Face magazine in April 1998 in hair and makeup similar to that used in this show
No. 13	Spring/Summer 1999	27 September 1998	Gatliff Road Warehouse, London	Arts and Crafts movement of the 1880s to 1920s; finale inspired by Rebecca Horn installation High Moon (1991)	Show ended with model Shalom Harlow being spray-painted by robots
The Overlook	Autumn/Winter 1999	23 February 1999	Gatliff Road Warehouse, London	The Shining, a 1980 psychological horror film by Stanley Kubrick, particularly its winter setting	First attendance of Vogue editor Anna Wintour at a McQueen show
Eye	Spring/Summer 2000	16 September 1999	Pier 94, New York City	Islamic culture and clothing, especially the burqa; relationship of Western world to Middle East	First time debuting a show outside of London (Note: Both Banshee and Dante had been reprised in New York City at the behest of fashion promoter Derek Anderson.)
Eshu	Autumn/Winter 2000	15 February 2000	Gainsborough Studios, London	Named for Yoruba deity Eshu; African-inspired primitivism with elements of Victorian fashion	Anti-fur activists broke into the venue before the show and vandalised the set, resulting in heavy security on the day of the show
Voss	Spring/Summer 2001	26 September 2000	Gatliff Road Warehouse, London	Staged as a voyeuristic look inside a stereotypical insane asylum; dresses of unusual materials like seashells and microscope slides	Finale showpiece presented author Michelle Olley nude, masked, and covered with live moths, in a recreation of Sanitarium (1983), a photograph by Joel-Peter Witkin
What a Merry-Go-Round	Autumn/Winter 2001	21 February 2001	Gatliff Road Warehouse, London	Dark underside of carnivals and circuses; Child Catcher villain from Chitty Chitty Bang Bang (1968)	Final presentation at Gatliff Road; first appearance of skull print that is now a signature of the brand
The Dance of the Twisted Bull	Spring/Summer 2002	6 October 2001	Stade Français sports club, Paris	Spanish culture, especially bullfighting and flamenco dancing	First collection after selling label to Gucci Group; first McQueen collection shown in Paris
Supercalifragilistic-expialidocious	Autumn/Winter 2002	9 March 2002	La Conciergerie, Paris	Films of American director Tim Burton, especially Sleepy Hollow (1999); English school uniforms; photography of Helmut Lang	Lighting and invitation by film director Tim Burton
Irere	Spring/Summer 2003	5 October 2002	Grande halle de la Villette, Paris	Three-phase narrative: shipwrecked pirates, drowned maidens in black, and birds of paradise	Debut of the "oyster dress", a riff on a 1987 design by John Galliano called the "shellfish dress"
Scanners	Autumn/Winter 2003	8 March 2003	Grande halle de la Villette, Paris	Journey eastward through the clothing of northern Eurasia: Siberia and the Russian Far East, Tibet, and Japan	Clear plastic wind tunnel was suspended over the runway for some models to walk through
Deliverance	Spring/Summer 2004	10 October 2003	Salle Wagram, Paris	Depression-era fashion, 1969 film They Shoot Horses, Don't They?	Runway show was a performance emulating a dance marathon, with choreography by dancer Michael Clark
Pantheon ad Lucem	Autumn/Winter 2004	5 March 2004	Grande halle de la Villette, Paris	Ancient Greek draped garments; science fiction films like Close Encounters of the Third Kind (1977) and 2001: A Space Odyssey (1968)	Entire title often incorrectly translated as Latin for "Towards the Light"; this is the correct translation for "ad lucem" but neglects to account for "pantheon"
It's Only a Game	Spring/Summer 2005	8 October 2004	Palais Omnisports de Paris-Bercy, Paris	Contrast of fashion cultures, giant chess scene from 2001 film of Harry Potter and the Philosopher's Stone	Runway show featured performance inspired by Harry Potter chess, choreographed by dancer Les Child
The Man Who Knew Too Much	Autumn/Winter 2005	4 March 2005	Lycée Carnot, Paris	1950s fashion, particularly as seen in the Alfred Hitchcock thriller The Man Who Knew Too Much (1956)	Show invite based on theatrical poster for Hitchcock's film Vertigo (1958); first McQueen handbag, named for actress Kim Novak, who frequently appeared in Hitchcock films
Neptune	Spring/Summer 2006	7 October 2005	Imprimerie Nationale, Paris	1980s fashion, including power dressing, hard glamour, and body conscious designs	All models were at least 5'11" in reference to the 1980s trend for Amazonian supermodels
The Widows of Culloden	Autumn/Winter 2006	3 March 2006	Palais Omnisports de Paris-Bercy, Paris	Second examination of English violence towards Scotland in more mature and melancholy terms; centres the widows of the Battle of Culloden (1746)	Show closed with an illusion of Kate Moss as an apparition within a glass pyramid at the centre of the stage
Sarabande	Spring/Summer 2007	6 October 2006	Cirque d'hiver, Paris	Exploration of fragility and decaying grandeur through floral motifs	One dress was covered with fresh flowers, which began to fall off on the runway in a moment of serendipitous beauty
In Memory of Elizabeth Howe, Salem, 1692	Autumn/Winter 2007	2 March 2007	Le Zénith Arena, Paris	Religious persecution conducted by Puritans in 17th century; ancient Egyptian religion; occult symbolism	Final McQueen show styled by long-time stylist Katy England
La Dame Bleue	Spring/Summer 2008	5 October 2007	Palais Omnisports de Paris-Bercy, Paris	Reinvention through fashion; avian and butterfly motifs; personal style of Isabella Blow	Collaboration with Philip Treacy to memorialise their mutual friend Isabella Blow, who committed suicide in May 2007
The Girl Who Lived in the Tree	Autumn/Winter 2008	29 February 2008	Palais Omnisports de Paris-Bercy, Paris	Fairy tale narrative about a girl who lived in a tree; British culture and national symbols; clothing of India during the British Raj	Philip Treacy created a single headpiece for the collection: an enormous peacock with fanned tail, made from driftwood and sea fan coral
Natural Dis-tinction Un-natural Selection	Spring/Summer 2009	3 October 2008	Le Centquatre, Paris	Beauty of nature contrasted with the impact of human industry	First of final three collections which shared a theme of the destruction of nature by humanity
The Horn of Plenty	Autumn/Winter 2009	10 March 2009	Palais Omnisports de Paris-Bercy, Paris	Dark satire of the fashion industry with pastiches of notable designers and McQueen's past works; many items made to resemble trash	Creative process documented by photographer Nick Waplington, published in photo book Alexander McQueen: Working Process
Plato's Atlantis	Spring/Summer 2010	6 October 2009	Palais Omnisports de Paris-Bercy, Paris	Human evolution following global flooding as a result of climate change	Final fully-realised collection; first livestreamed fashion show in history; debut of the armadillo shoe; debut of Lady Gaga single "Bad Romance"
Angels and Demons	Autumn/Winter 2010	10 March 2010	Hôtel de Clermont-Tonnerre, Paris	Religious paintings of the Medieval and Renaissance periods	Collection left incomplete at the time of McQueen's suicide in February 2010, completed posthumously by his assistant Sarah Burton; title is unofficial

== Bibliography ==
- Bethune, Kate (2015). "Encyclopedia of Collections". In Wilcox, Claire (ed.). Alexander McQueen. New York City: Abrams Books. pp. 303–326. ISBN 978-1-4197-1723-9. OCLC 891618596.
- Bolton, Andrew (2011). Alexander McQueen: Savage Beauty. New York City: Metropolitan Museum of Art. ISBN 978-1-58839-412-5. Archived from the original on 22 April 2023.
  - Frankel, Susannah. Introduction. In Bolton (2011), pp. 17–27.
- Bolton, Andrew (2018). "III. Fashioning Devotion". Heavenly Bodies: Fashion and the Catholic Imagination. Vol. II. New York City: Metropolitan Museum of Art. ISBN 978-1-58839-645-7. Archived from the original on 22 April 2023.
- Bowles, Hamish (2014). Vogue & the Metropolitan Museum of Art Costume Institute: Parties, Exhibitions, People (1st ed.). New York: Condé Nast. ISBN 978-1-4197-1424-5. OCLC 871511830.
- Callahan, Maureen (2014). Champagne Supernovas: Kate Moss, Marc Jacobs, Alexander McQueen, and the '90s Renegades Who Remade Fashion. New York City: Touchstone Books. ISBN 978-1-4516-4053-3.
- Deniau, Anne (2012). Love Looks Not with the Eyes: Thirteen Years with Lee Alexander McQueen. Abrams. ISBN 978-1-61312-415-4. Archived from the original on 27 April 2023.
- Fairer, Robert; Wilcox, Claire (2016). Alexander McQueen: Unseen. New Haven, Connecticut: Yale University Press. ISBN 978-0-300-22267-8. OCLC 946216643.
- Gleason, Katherine (2012). Alexander McQueen: Evolution. New York City: Race Point Publishing. ISBN 978-1-61058-837-9. Archived from the original on 5 January 2023.
- Thomas, Dana (2015). Gods and Kings: The Rise and Fall of Alexander McQueen and John Galliano. New York City: Penguin Publishing. ISBN 978-1-101-61795-3.
- Watt, Judith (2012). Alexander McQueen: The Life and the Legacy. New York City: Harper Design. ISBN 978-1-84796-085-6. OCLC 892706946.
- Wilson, Andrew (2015). Alexander McQueen: Blood Beneath the Skin. New York City: Simon and Schuster. ISBN 978-1-4767-7674-3.
