= Banshee (collection) =

1994 fashion collection by Alexander McQueen

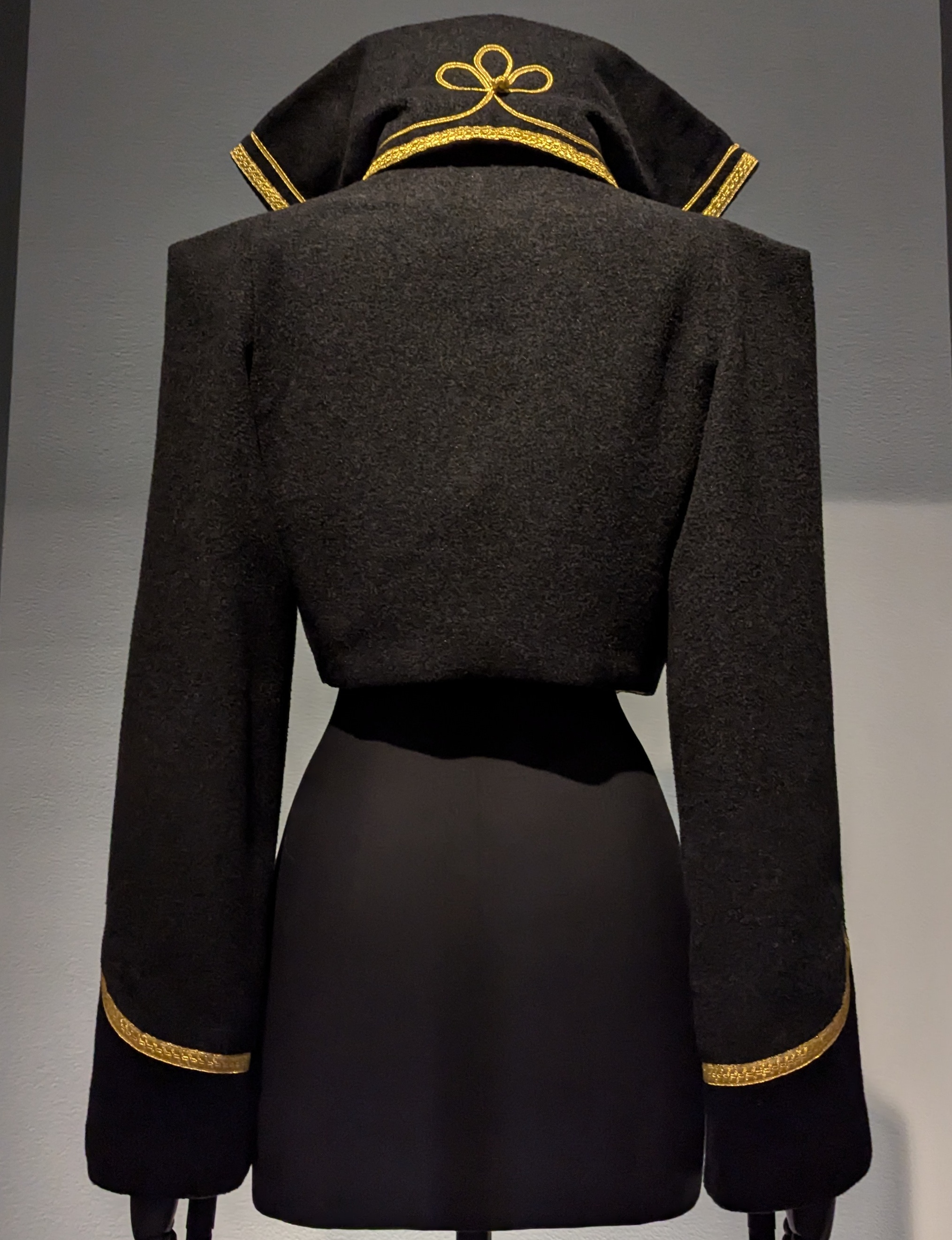
Jacket from Banshee at Lee Alexander McQueen & Ann Ray - Rendez-Vous (2024)

Banshee (Irish: Bheansidhe) is the fourth collection by British designer Alexander McQueen, released for the Autumn/Winter 1994 season of his eponymous fashion house. McQueen was inspired by myths of banshees mournfully wailing after shipwrecks and sought to present women as resilient survivors of tragic circumstances. The overall tone was darkly romantic, with a reprise of the extreme styling and experimentation that had characterised his previous collection, Nihilism (Spring/Summer 1994).

Although he had been trained on Savile Row and the collection featured classically tailored items, McQueen broke from tradition with unconventional shapes on many designs. Sexuality was emphasised with sheer garments and silhouettes which exposed the body, including the return of the low-rise bumster trousers. Even knitwear was rendered provocative with the insertion of sheer panels that exposed the breasts. Historical elements included frock coats, naval dress jackets, and Elizabethan necklines. Many garments were distressed for effect, and one showpiece look was a moulded bodice made from plaster of Paris.

The runway show was staged on 26 February 1994 during London Fashion Week, at the Café de Paris nightclub. Like its predecessor, the styling was aggressive and the production amateurish. Everyone who contributed was unpaid and there were no pre-show fittings. Models had the McQueen brand logo stencilled on their hair and acted provocatively on the runway, walking first to Celtic pipe music, which transitioned to heavy electronic dance music.

Although few mainstream journalists attended, the collection received positive reviews from industry guests, who highlighted the novelty of McQueen's ideas and his tailoring. It was re-staged for New York Fashion Week, where it was received warmly by the fashion community. Scholarly analysis has considered the novelty of the ideas and the implications of the plaster bodice. Two items from Banshee appeared in the retrospective exhibit Alexander McQueen: Savage Beauty. Seán McGirr heavily referenced Banshee for Spring/Summer 2025, his second collection as creative director for the Alexander McQueen brand.

== Background ==
British fashion designer Alexander McQueen was known for his imaginative, sometimes controversial designs, and dramatic fashion shows. Over the course of his career, which lasted from 1992 until his death in 2010, he explored a broad range of ideas and themes, particularly sexuality, death, violence, romanticism, and historicism. The son of a London taxicab driver and a teacher, he grew up in one of the poorer neighbourhoods in London's East End. During childhood, he witnessed his sisters experiencing domestic violence at the hands of their husbands, which became a formative influence on his designs.

As a young apprentice on Savile Row, McQueen earned a reputation as an expert tailor. In 1992, he graduated with a master's degree in fashion design from Central Saint Martins (CSM), a London art school, where he met a number of his future collaborators. His graduation collection, Jack the Ripper Stalks His Victims, was bought in its entirety by magazine editor Isabella Blow, who became his mentor and his muse. McQueen launched his own label with Taxi Driver (Autumn/Winter 1993), in which he debuted the bumster trouser. The extremely low waist exposed the top of the intergluteal cleft, and the style became a McQueen brand signature.

McQueen had no financial backing at the beginning of his career, so his collections were created on minimal budgets, using cheap fabric and unconventional materials to make up for the shortfall. He collaborated with friends and other creatives to save money and make items outside his expertise. Collaborators during this period worked for minimal pay or were paid in garments. Some agreed to work for free because they were interested in working with McQueen, while others who had been promised compensation were simply never paid.

== Concept and collection ==
=== Production ===
If I get someone like Suzy Menkes in the front row, wearing her fucking Christian Lacroix, I make sure that lady gets pissed on by one of the girls, you know what I mean? These people can make you or break you, and they love you for just a moment. I may be the name on everyone's lips at the moment, but they can kill you.

— McQueen, to Mark O'Flaherty for the Pink Paper, 1 April 1994 (Note: In the original printed edition, Menkes's name is censored, and the quote ends at the first sentence. O'Flaherty published the expanded version in a 2013 article.)

Banshee (Irish: Bheansidhe) is the fourth collection McQueen made for his eponymous fashion house. Due to his lack of backing, production was funded by McQueen's welfare cheques and cash provided by Isabella Blow's husband Detmar Blow. McQueen was assisted by his then-boyfriend Andrew Groves and his roommate Simon Ungless, a friend from CSM who also developed prints for the collection. With no formal studio space, they worked at McQueen's home in Tooting, London. Julien Macdonald, an intern with McQueen's former employer Koji Tatsuno, was hired to produce knitwear.

During this period, McQueen courted controversy in an attempt to attract interest and funding. His friend Alice Smith described him as "a very good operator" who would make outrageous claims with a straight face, which became the seeds of publicity-driving rumors. He was provocatively outspoken in his criticism of fashion journalists, feeling that they had the power to make or break a designer's career.

=== Collection ===
Presented for the Autumn/Winter 1994 season, the collection was inspired by the banshee, a female spirit from Irish mythology whose mournful wailing heralds death. McQueen was interested in presenting women as powerful and resilient survivors of tragic circumstances. He combined this idea with stories of banshees wailing after shipwrecks. A lifelong cinemaphile, he also said he was inspired by Belle de Jour, a 1967 film by Luis Buñuel, in which a woman enjoys secretly working as a high-class prostitute while her husband is at the office. (Note: Author Judith Watt asserts that McQueen must have been joking and would not have been "so predictable" with his inspiration. Other biographers, including Andrew Wilson and Dana Thomas, treat McQueen's statement seriously.) The collection's overall tone was darkly romantic.

In pre-show interviews, McQueen contrasted Banshee with his previous collection, Nihilism (Spring/Summer 1994), saying that while Nihilism had been intended as a provocation to the London fashion industry, Banshee was meant to be more refined and commercially viable. Nevertheless, the clothing in Banshee was, like its predecessor, highly sexualised. Many garments were cut to expose nipples or full breasts. Sheer dresses with minimal underwear revealed the body beneath, a visual reference to themes of repressed and liberated sexuality from Belle de Jour.

Lee had never seen such an unusual material used for knitting and thought it was hilarious [...] He drew up a quick sketch of the sweater [...] and he named it "Get Your Tits Out" whilst laughing hysterically. He loved the shock value and told me that it reminded him of a fetish outfit he had seen in a club the night before.

— Julien Macdonald, interviewed by Dana Thomas for Gods and Kings (2015)

Knitwear was made provocative with the addition of translucent sections that exposed the breasts. Macdonald had developed these panels, made from knitted fishing line, as an experiment. Upon seeing it, McQueen sketched a concept for a sweater with full sleeves and turtleneck, with large sheer panels that revealed the entire chest and back, save a small vertical strip down the centre of each side; he called it the "Get Your Tits Out". Three other variations appeared in the show.

Although he had been trained on Savile Row, and the collection featured classically tailored suits and separates, McQueen broke from tradition with unconventional cuts and shapes. Banshee saw the reprise of the bumster trousers, already a brand signature, and skirts with the same low waistline. There was also an even more extreme version called the "cuntster": detached trouser legs in classic trouser materials like wool check, held up at the thighs by drawstrings. On the runway they were styled with long shirts to cover the pelvis. There were also high-rise trousers with hems above the ankles, which would be frowned upon in traditional tailoring. Other McQueen flourishes included extra-long sharp lapels, pointed shoulders, slices that revealed armpits, and extra-long sleeves reminiscent of straitjackets.

McQueen loved to experiment with materials. He would make unusual textile pairings such as thick flannel fabrics with latex or sequins, or heavy pea coats in melton fabric with silver lace. Other items were distressed for effect. Dresses with tattered and damaged fabric called to mind the aftermath of a shipwreck. One jacket was printed to resemble a billboard with torn layers of advertisements. Shift dresses with a distressed-looking blood-red print may have been a reference to stories of banshees washing blood from dead men's clothing. One black taffeta frock coat was covered with resin, which when hardened looked like black glass. Ungless's prints included metallic abstracts that looked like molten silver on gauzy dresses, which curator Kate Bethune described as "painterly". There was a high-necked hip-length bodice made from plaster of Paris over chicken wire, moulded with large breasts.

Banshee also showcased McQueen's interest in historicism. Oversized high collars on shirts and jackets and low, nipple-exposing necklines referenced the fashion of the Elizabethan era. Cropped military-style jackets, flared sleeves, and profuse application of gold braid as trim suggested naval dress uniforms. There were Empire waist dresses made from three layers of chiffon, and long tailored frock coats cut using what McQueen described as a "sixteenth-century method based on architecture".

== Runway show ==
=== Production details ===
The runway show was staged on 26 February 1994 at the Café de Paris, a nightclub in the West End of London. It was the closing slot for that season's London Fashion Week. The invitation was printed with a black and white photograph by Rankin, showing a nude older woman with her arms behind her head. The show was sponsored by Stella Artois and Dazed & Confused magazine. Isabella Blow, eager to publicise her protege, secured the attendance of friends who worked in the industry: fashion journalists Michael Roberts and Suzy Menkes and designers Joseph Ettedgui and Manolo Blahnik. Not many other industry personnel attended; most guests were CSM students or friends of the crew.

If anyone's going to tell me they hate something it's going to be a lesbian. They're not going to wear anything by a man that doesn't emphasize their sexuality.

— McQueen, on his preference for using lesbian models, quoted in Gods and Kings

The show was an amateur production. Everyone who contributed was unpaid, from the lighting personnel to the styling team to the models. According to Roberts, some models were "street people of mixed race, size, and indeterminable gender". Others were friends from the industry, like Tiina Laakkonen. Blow walked in the show herself and recruited socialite Plum Sykes as a model. Macdonald arrived with his sweaters only thirty minutes before the show started and McQueen's mother served tea and snacks backstage before taking her place in the front row to watch the show. Laakkonen described the situation as "completely raw and home-cooked". Roberts recalled it as "chaotic, damp, and smelly".

A professional fashion show would normally have fittings beforehand to ensure that each model fit the clothes she was assigned and determine the order they would walk in. The production would also provide the shoes. For Banshee, outfits and running order were assigned on the day of as models turned up and they were asked to bring their own shoes. Rebecca Lowthorpe was assigned the plaster bodice because McQueen liked the look of her long neck. Although initially disappointed with the assignment, she changed her mind after putting it on over the chiffon dress it was paired with. She was unable to bend at the waist while wearing the heavy, uncomfortable item, and resting required that she lie down completely. Other models gave her drinks through a straw backstage.

=== Styling and presentation ===
According to Sykes, McQueen was involved in all aspects of styling the show, from dressing the models to helping design their make-up and hair. The runway makeup was inspired by the paintings of Edvard Munch, especially The Scream. Beige-grey foundation with dark brown contouring on the cheeks made the models appear to be emaciated. Sykes recalled that McQueen's intent was "to shock and disturb". Eugene Souleiman styled hair and was responsible for suggesting that models were to have the "McQueen" logo stencilled in silver paint on their heads.

The set dressing was simple. Models entered around white-draped theatre flats at the rear of the venue. The soundtrack began with Celtic pipe music, which transitioned to heavy electronic dance music and a song with a woman rapping obscene lyrics; McQueen had chosen the rap track to make a subversive point about sexuality.

The show opened with a high-necked full-length sheer white dress. Next up was a sheer black dress with a low, Elizabethan-style neckline that exposed the nipples; it was worn by a pregnant woman with a shaved head, sometimes described as a skinhead. She posed at the end of the runway like the wife in the 1434 Jan van Eyck painting Arnolfini Portrait, one of McQueen's favourites. Next up was Lowthorpe modelling the plaster bodice. A few looks later came a model in a white dress styled with a headpiece that Katherine Gleason said resembled "an entire squashed bird". Laakkonen wore the black coat with resin and tore her lace undershirt open on the runway. Blow's first look was a purple button-down shirt with a long tail. Tizer Bailey mimed putting her finger in her vagina under her tunic, then put the finger in her mouth. The gray "Get Your Tits Out" sweater was worn on the runway with PVC underwear. Blow's second look was a vest decorated with pieces of broken Stella Artois bottles, worn over a black lace dress.

== Reception ==
Reception for the show was positive, according to retrospective assessments. Gleason reported that the crowd cheered throughout. Journalist Dana Thomas wrote that the "few reporters who did attend the show realized that they had witnessed something extremely special—and new". Adrian Clark of Fashion Weekly thought the collection was very creative but scored it lower on commercial viability. He wrote that McQueen was "helping London back to its feet" creatively. Mark O'Flaherty described it as "an eclectic mix of fully blown romance offset by an aggressive edge", and complimented McQueen for not aping Vivienne Westwood, at that time one of Britain's most well-known fashion designers.

The fashion designers that Blow had invited remarked positively on McQueen's work. Ettedgui called him "the next John Galliano or Vivienne Westwood" – Galliano was then another of Britain's best-known designers. Blahnik was excited about the quality of McQueen's finishing, calling it closer to haute couture than ready-to-wear.

Despite the positive attention, McQueen was ignored by the larger British fashion outlets. Even though Blow worked at British Vogue, Thomas reports that her colleagues "considered McQueen a ne'er-do-well" and shut him out entirely.

=== New York reprise ===
Derek Anderson, who worked as a fashion promoter in New York City, invited McQueen to re-stage Banshee for New York Fashion Week in May 1994. Anderson invited many of the city's industry notables to the show, including Polly Mellen, creative director of Allure; Ingrid Sischy, editor-in-chief of Interview, and Constance White, fashion editor for the American edition of Elle. Reception for the reprise was also positive: Anderson recalled Mellen as saying that McQueen was "the future of fashion". In the days following the show, several other major editors came to view the collection: Anna Wintour, André Leon Talley, and Hamish Bowles from Vogue; Gilles Bensimon and Marin Hopper from Elle; and Liz Tilberis of Harper's Bazaar. Many borrowed the clothing for editorial photo shoots and Elle and Interview did stories on McQueen. McQueen gave a provocative interview to Women's Wear Daily, in which he complained that fashion in New York lacked creativity.

In her editorial for Elle, Ruth La Ferla highlighted McQueen's technical skills, writing that the collection's "ashcan elegance is the product of deft engineering". She noted that some of the seemingly awkward cuts served to shape the silhouette, such as the awkwardly high hemlines on pants, which "creates the impression the wearer is too tall for her clothes".

== Analysis ==
The collection's rebellion against what was then standard in fashion has drawn commentary. Watts credited the raw aesthetic of McQueen's early work, including Banshee, with moving fashion toward a grunge aesthetic and away from the "luxe glamour or soft-focus blur of femininity of late 1980s and early 1990s fashion". Difficulties with her outfit aside, Lowthorpe recalled the show positively, calling it an "almighty fuck-you to the industry at large" with its irreverent styling and presentation. She thought the collection felt like punk fashion, saying that McQueen "wanted to knock the white middle-class out of fashion" and replace it with something new.

Sociologist Henrique Grimaldi Figueredo identified Banshee as one of McQueen's many shows with a theme related to death. In his analysis, these themes "provided plastic elements for externalizing a generational trauma".

Some authors have commented on the medical aspect of the plaster bodice. In 2001, fashion historian Harold Koda identified it as part of a contemporary trend for designers to showcase corsets "that appear to be a combination of armor and corsetry". He thought McQueen's plaster design had turned the concept of a full-body cast, associated with injury, into a warrior's breastplate, declaring: "Feminine vulnerability is transfigured into feminine power." Sophie Lemahieu similarly wrote that the plaster bodice appeared to reference the corset's original function as an orthopedic medical device. She felt that McQueen seemed to be saying that his objective was to "take responsibility for and to assist the bodies he dresses", calling a leather corset from No. 13 (Spring/Summer 1999) indicative of the same ethos.

== Legacy ==
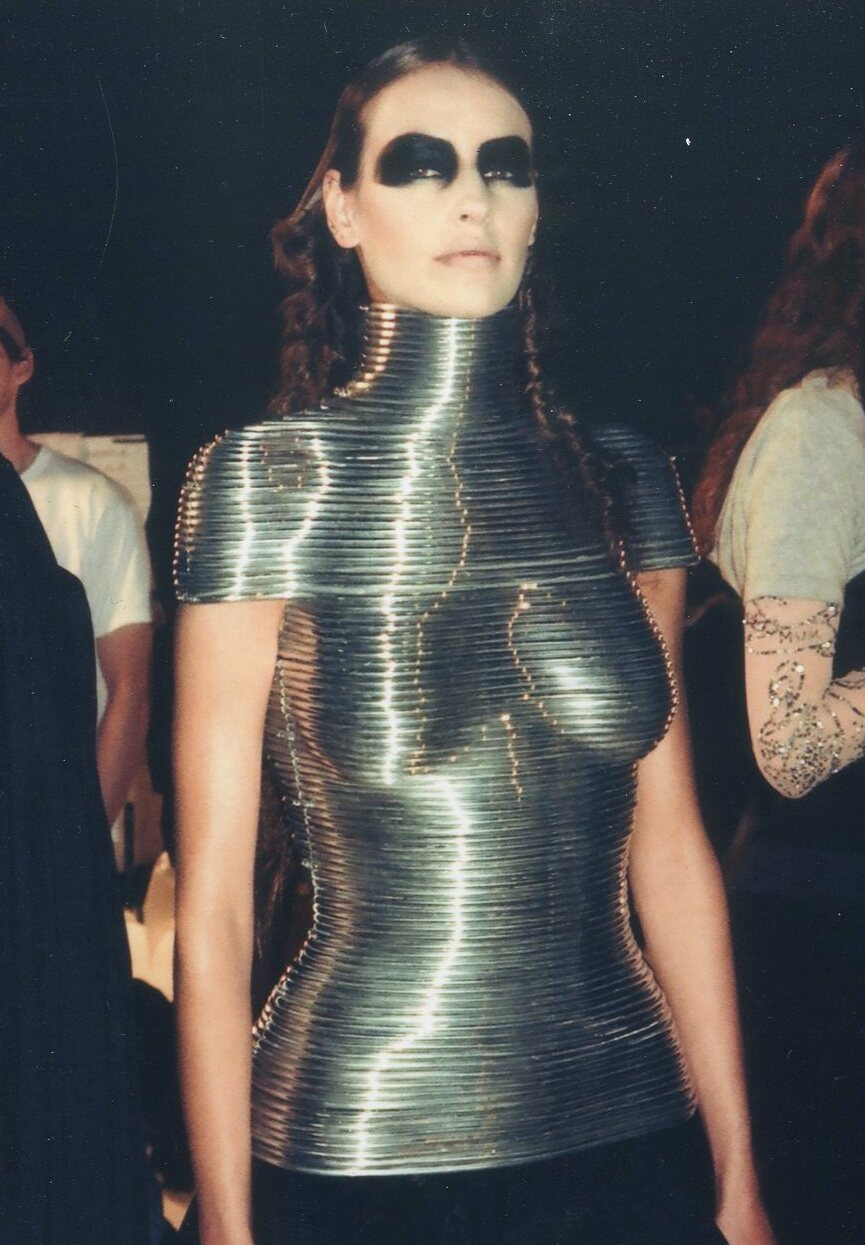
The coiled corset from Look 47 of The Overlook, pictured backstage at the 2004 McQueen retrospective show Black

While handmade designs from the collection retailed at Pellicano, a shop in Mayfair, McQueen was aware that he needed a more professional arrangement in order to make the sales necessary to sustain the label. Anderson arranged for McQueen to meet Eo Bocci, an Italian fashion manufacturer. Bocci expressed interest in the samples McQueen brought but wanted to see another show before signing a final contract. Anderson provided funding toward McQueen's next show, The Birds (Spring/Summer 1995), which was a success, and led to an agreement with Bocci.

Author Judith Watts wrote that McQueen was "building his signature look" in this collection, which featured the historicism and tailoring that came to define him as a designer. Distressed garments and a darkly romantic feel continued to be among McQueen's recurring idiosyncrasies. Journalist Susannah Frankel recalled that McQueen "would make these beautiful pieces of clothing and then fuck them up", much to the distress of his mother, who would chastise him for damaging "the lovely dresses".

Banshee marked the first appearance of the moulded bodice concept which featured in a number of later collections. It was seen next in The Hunger (Spring/Summer 1996), which featured a clear plastic corset with worms inside. For No. 13, McQueen worked with product designer Kees van der Graaf to create plaster of Paris life casts of model Laura Morgan, from which several moulded leather bodices were made. The same casts were used to create bodices for several future collections, including The Overlook (Autumn/Winter 1999) and It's Only a Game (Spring/Summer 2005).

Two jackets from Banshee appeared in the retrospective exhibition Alexander McQueen: Savage Beauty, originally staged in 2011 at the Metropolitan Museum of Art in New York City. The first was made of black wool and silver silk with gold military braid as embroidery, loaned by Daphne Guinness, a friend of McQueen's. The other was gray wool, also with gold military braid embroidery, loaned by Ruti Danan, an early collaborator.

Seán McGirr heavily referenced Banshee for Spring/Summer 2025, his second collection as creative director for the Alexander McQueen brand.

== Bibliography ==
- Bolton, Andrew (2011). Alexander McQueen: Savage Beauty. New York City: Metropolitan Museum of Art. ISBN 978-1-58839-412-5. OCLC 687693871.
- Evans, Caroline (2003). Fashion at the Edge: Spectacle, Modernity and Deathliness. New Haven, Connecticut: Yale University Press. ISBN 978-0-300-10192-8.
- Gleason, Katherine (2012). Alexander McQueen: Evolution. New York City: Race Point Publishing. ISBN 978-1-61058-837-9. OCLC 783147416.
- Grimaldi Figueredo, Henrique (20 November 2020). "Performing the risk: four contemporary obituaries in Alexander McQueen". Conceição/Conception. 9: 12. doi:10.20396/conce.v9i00.8659720. ISSN 2317-5737.
- Knight, Nick (7 May 2015). Alexander McQueen: Susannah Frankel / Nick Knight Interview: Military Jacket, Banshee A/W 94. SHOWstudio (Video).
- Koda, Harold (2001). Extreme Beauty: The Body Transformed. New York City: Metropolitan Museum of Art. ISBN 978-0-300-10312-0.
- Lemahieu, Sophie (2015). "Corsets, Crinolines, and Bustles in Today's Fashions: Drawing Creative Inspiration from the History of Undergarments". In Bruna, Denis (ed.). Fashioning the Body: An Intimate History of the Silhouette. Yale University: Yale University Press.
- Lowthorpe, Rebecca (29 May 2013). SHOWstudio: Punk: On the Runway - Rebecca Lowthorpe. SHOWstudio (Video).
- Mora, Juliana Luna; Berry, Jess (2 September 2022). "Creative Direction Succession in Luxury Fashion: The Illusion of Immortality at Chanel and Alexander McQueen". Luxury. 9 (2–3): 117–140. doi:10.1080/20511817.2022.2194039. ISSN 2051-1817.
- Thomas, Dana (2015). Gods and Kings: The Rise and Fall of Alexander McQueen and John Galliano. New York City: Penguin Publishing. ISBN 978-1-101-61795-3. OCLC 951153602.
- Watt, Judith (2012). Alexander McQueen: The Life and the Legacy. New York City: Harper Design. ISBN 978-1-84796-085-6. OCLC 892706946.
- Wilcox, Claire, ed. (2015). Alexander McQueen. New York City: Abrams Books. ISBN 978-1-4197-1723-9. OCLC 891618596.
  - Bethune, Kate. "Encyclopedia of Collections". In Wilcox (2015), pp. 303–326.
  - Evans, Caroline. "Modelling McQueen: Hard Grace". In Wilcox (2015), pp. 189–201.
  - Frankel, Susannah. "The Early Years". In Wilcox (2015), pp. 69–79.
- Wilson, Andrew (2015). Alexander McQueen: Blood Beneath the Skin. New York City: Simon and Schuster. ISBN 978-1-4767-7674-3. OCLC 1310585849.
