= The Hunger (collection) =

1996 fashion collection by Alexander McQueen

Look 64, corset made from translucent plastic with real worms embedded within, worn with a red-lined grey jacket and red silk skirt. At the hips, an item of unconventional silver jewellery which creator Shaun Leane calls a "stag piece". (Note: Other sources refer to the hip pieces from this collection with a variety of names. Caroline Evans called it a "brooch worn at the groin". The Met website described it as "antlers". Judith Watt called it "handcuffs". Catherine Spooner called it a "stirrup".)

The Hunger is the seventh collection by British designer Alexander McQueen, released for the Spring/Summer 1996 season of his eponymous fashion house. The collection was primarily inspired by The Hunger, a 1983 erotic horror film about vampires. McQueen had limited financial backing, so the collection was created on a minimal budget. Typically for McQueen in the early stages of his career, the collection centred around sharply tailored garments and emphasised female sexuality. It was his first collection to include menswear.

The runway show for The Hunger was staged at London's Natural History Museum on 23 October 1995, during London Fashion Week. Like McQueen's previous professional shows, The Hunger was styled with imagery of sexuality, violence, and death, most prominently a corset of translucent plastic with real worms encased within. Models bared their breasts and flashed obscene gestures on the runway, and the show concluded with McQueen mooning the audience.

Critical reception to The Hunger was mixed. Some reviewers found it a highlight of a dull season, while others denigrated McQueen's perceived immaturity as a designer. Some repeated accusations that McQueen's work was misogynistic. Retrospective analysis has focused on the cinematic inspiration behind the collection and the gothic imagery of the worm corset. Many of the people who worked on The Hunger with McQueen would go on to become longtime collaborators. Garments from The Hunger appeared in both stagings of the retrospective exhibition Alexander McQueen: Savage Beauty.

== Background ==
British fashion designer Alexander McQueen was known for his imaginative, sometimes controversial designs, and dramatic fashion shows. Over the course of his career, which lasted from 1992 until his death in 2010, he explored a broad range of ideas and themes, particularly sexuality, death, violence, romanticism, and historicism. He began as an apprentice on Savile Row, earning a reputation as an expert tailor. In October 1990, at the age of 21, McQueen began the masters-level course in fashion design at Central Saint Martins (CSM), a London art school. McQueen met a number of his future collaborators at CSM, including printmaker Simon Ungless and Sebastian Pons. He also cultivated an interest in outdoing fellow British designer John Galliano, whose work was known for being creative and theatrical.

McQueen graduated with his master's in 1992. His degree collection, Jack the Ripper Stalks His Victims, was bought in its entirety by magazine editor Isabella Blow, who became his mentor and his muse. McQueen's reputation for shocking runway shows began early; the sexualised clothing and aggressive styling in his first professional show, Nihilism (Spring/Summer 1994), was described by The Independent as a "horror show". The follow-up, Banshee (Autumn/Winter 1994), featured a model pretending to put a finger in her vagina on the runway. McQueen's sixth collection, Highland Rape (Autumn/Winter 1995), drew accusations of misogyny. The resulting controversy is considered to be the launching point of McQueen's fame and has been credited with leading to his appointment as head designer at French luxury fashion house Givenchy.

At the beginning of his career, McQueen had no financial backing, so his earliest collections were created on minimal budgets. He purchased whatever cheap fabric or fabric scraps were available. Collaborators often worked for minimal pay or were paid in garments. Some agreed to work for free because they were interested in working with McQueen and knew he could not afford to pay them anyway, while others who had been promised compensation were simply never paid.

== Concept and creative process ==
=== Financial backing ===
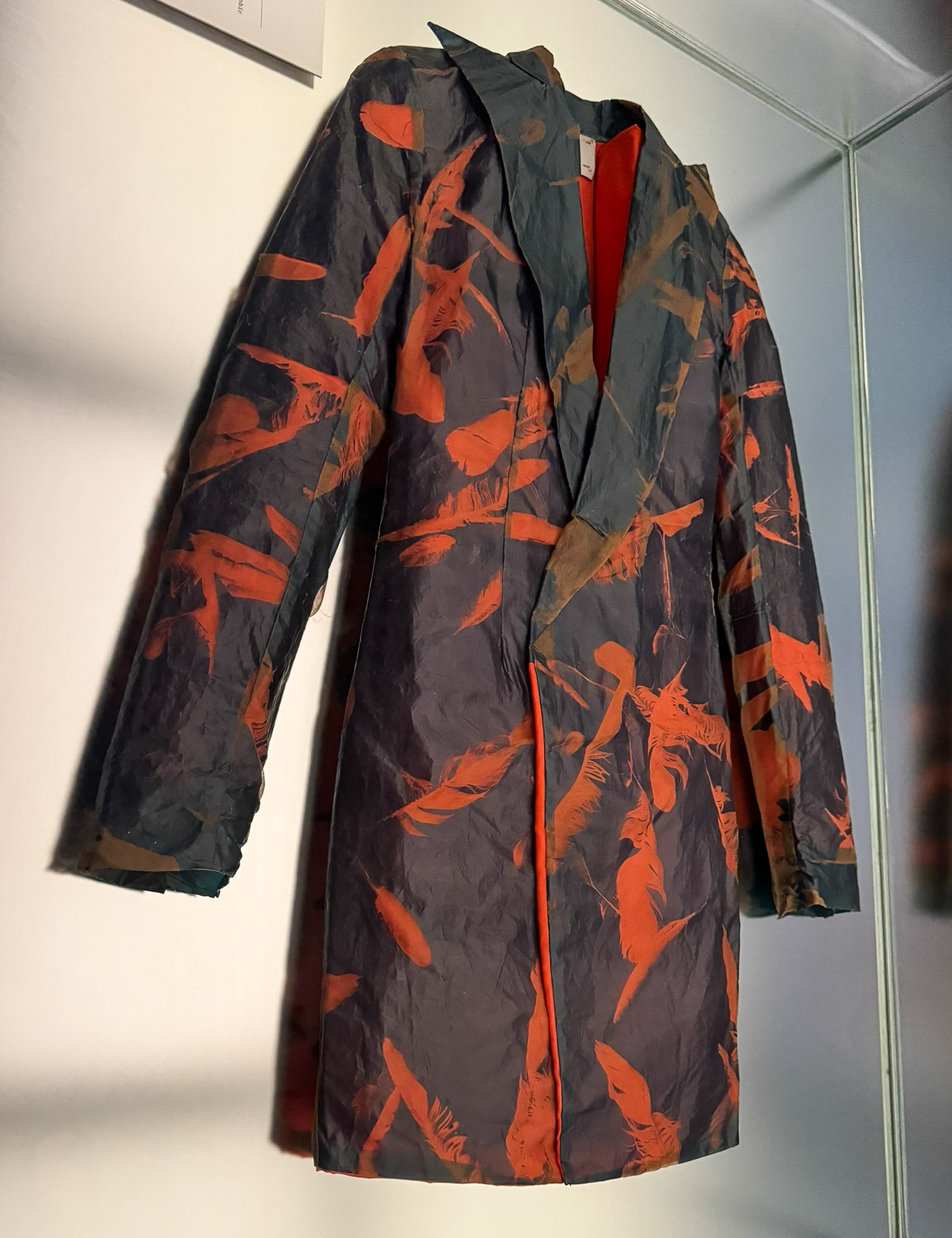
Men's jacket with feather pattern from Look 29 at Sleeping Beauties: Reawakening Fashion at the Metropolitan Museum of Art, New York City (2024)

Following the success of The Birds (Spring/Summer 1995), McQueen had secured some funding from Eo Bocci, an Italian fashion manufacturer. Bocci arranged a distribution deal from Bus Stop, a subsidiary of Japanese apparel firm Onward Kashiyama. The contract with Bus Stop mandated the inclusion of menswear, a first for McQueen's career. Production for the collection was handled by Milanese manufacturer MA Commerciale. Fleet Bigwood, a CSM lecturer, contributed to fabric design.

Despite the financial backing, McQueen was still operating under financial constraints. As with previous collections, most of McQueen's collaborators on The Hunger worked for little to no pay, believing the exposure and the chance to work with McQueen was valuable in itself. Simon Ungless agreed to a low fee of £500 to design prints. Pons, aware that McQueen was living in poverty, "never asked him for any money", under the assumption that "it was going to pay off in the long term".

=== Inspiration and styling ===
The Hunger is the seventh collection by McQueen for his eponymous fashion house, for the Spring/Summer 1996 season. It was inspired by the erotic horror films The Hunger (1983), which featured a love triangle between two vampires and a human doctor, and Cat People (1982), in which a young woman discovers she is a seductive werecat. As was typical for McQueen, the collection focused on sharp tailoring, experimental materials, and strategically-bared skin. Prior to the show, he stated that his intention was to produce "wearable clothes" that balanced artistic expression with commercial concerns. He told his friend and collaborator Pons that he "wanted to break some rules and do something a bit shocking".

The collection's palette was mainly red, white, and black. McQueen made use of natural materials such as leather and feathers, and incorporated nature-themed prints with designs of leopard spots, thorns, and feathers. Other, more modern or unconventional materials also appeared. Textile consultant Kim Hassler was asked to produce a sweater made of fur from McQueen's mother's dog. The feather print used on the jacket from Look 29 was created using a photo emulsion process on a nylon silkscreen. Normally the silkscreen would be used to print duplicates, but McQueen simply made it into the coat, although it was not intended for this purpose.

Sexuality was front and centre. One of the men's shirts featured a graffiti-style design that referenced the sexual act of fisting. Many garments featured extreme cutouts and slashes, exposing the lining or the model's bare flesh. Menswear and womenswear alike had cuts which exposed breasts and thighs. Depending on the placement, the slashes visually evoked the vulva or self-harm by cutting, which McQueen sometimes engaged in. The low-cut bumster trousers for which McQueen had become famous made an appearance in both men's and women's wear. The rest of the menswear primarily comprised short-sleeved button-up dress shirts, flat-front trousers, and leather jackets.

It's the ugly things I notice more, because other people tend to ignore the ugly things.

— McQueen, in an interview with The Face, November 1996

Some elements pointed back at his graduation collection, Jack the Ripper Stalks His Victims, including sharply-pointed collars, smears of blood, trimmings that imitated human flesh, and prints of thorns. In The Hunger, the visual motif of spilled blood evoked folklore about vampires drinking and exchanging blood. The most significant piece from the collection is a moulded corset created from two layers of translucent plastic encasing real worms, juxtaposing sexuality with imagery suggesting decay. The layers were pre-moulded on a fit model, and McQueen assembled the corset with fresh, live worms two hours before the runway show.

== Runway show ==
=== Production details ===
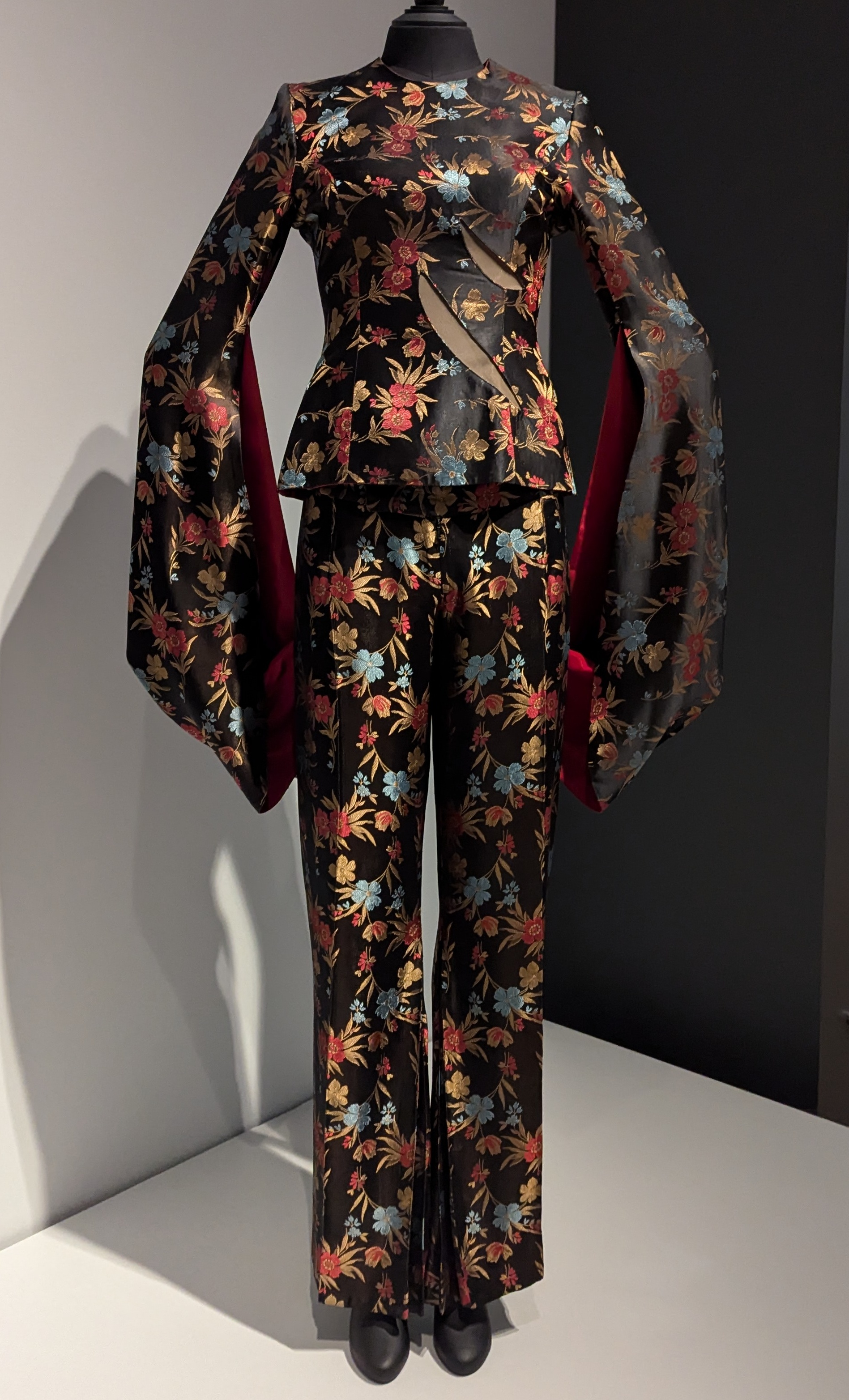
Kimono-sleeve slashed top and bumster trousers in floral brocade, presented at Rendez-Vous

The runway show for The Hunger was staged on 23 October 1995 during London Fashion Week. McQueen was assigned the desirable finale slot on the strength of his previous show, Highland Rape. The venue was a tent on the East Lawn at the Natural History Museum of London. McQueen had by this time become such a strong draw that some people attempted to gain entry to his shows with photocopied invitations. Attendance for The Hunger was reportedly up 30% compared to the previous season. Despite the financial support from Bocci, the budget for the runway show was reportedly only £600. In response to criticism of Highland Rape, McQueen uninvited several fashion journalists to The Hunger, and relegated at least one other to an undesirable third-row seat. McQueen's mother and his aunt Renee had front row seats.

McQueen often worked with friends and acquaintances, and The Hunger was no exception. Icelandic singer Björk, then dating McQueen's musician friend Goldie, produced the show's soundtrack. Goldie was recruited to walk in the show, along with other people in McQueen's social circle: Susanne Oberbeck of pop band No Bra, Jimmy Pursey of punk band Sham 69, and journalist Alix Sharkey. Milliner Philip Treacy, another of Blow's protégés, provided headpieces; it was the first of many collaborations. Many other personnel had worked with McQueen on previous shows. Eugene Souleiman and Val Garland returned to style models' hair and make-up, respectively. The runway show for The Hunger was dedicated to McQueen's friend Katy England, who was by then serving as his creative director. Sam Gainsbury, who had served as casting director for The Birds, produced the show.

Jeweller Shaun Leane, who had worked on Highland Rape, created accessories for the runway show of The Hunger. (Note: Kate Bethune's Encyclopedia of Collections incorrectly reports The Hunger as McQueen's first collaboration with Leane.) The silver jewellery he made was intended to evoke animality and hunger; Leane later recalled that McQueen had directed him to "create something that kind of creates a little bit of an edge between all the girls". Leane created two major designs for The Hunger. The "Tusk" earring was a long, thin curve of silver worn singly rather than paired. Leane called the second major design the "stag piece", a thorny silver ring which encircled the hips.

=== Catwalk presentation ===
The runway for The Hunger was plain white, with no set dressing. Journalist Dana Thomas described the soundtrack as "thumping club music punctuated with monkey howls". Makeup was cat-like, with eyebrows drawn up the forehead in exaggerated slashes, and hair was done in styles of the 1980s: mullets and Mohican haircuts. (Note: "Mohican haircut" is the British term for a haircut usually referred to as a "Mohawk haircut" in American English.) As with McQueen's previous runway shows, the styling for the models was explicitly sexual; outfits were cut to expose undergarments or breasts. Models were encouraged once again to display attitude on the runway: many made obscene gestures toward the audience such as the finger or V sign. Others flashed their breasts from beneath jackets worn with no shirt.

The Hunger comprised 95 looks, 28 of which were menswear, mixed in with the womenswear. Tailored jackets and trousers dominated the first half, while the second half focused on softer dresses and skirts. Stella Tennant wore Look 22, a white shift with a print of a leopard on the lower half. Looks 32 and 50, a midi-length dress and a two-piece ensemble, were made from silver mesh and paired with full-face coverings created by Treacy that resembled fencing masks. Look 35, a white midi-length dress, had a midsection roughly printed black, with its over-layer slit from breasts to navel; the overall effect has been compared to the vulva. The worm corset appeared as Look 64, styled with a tailored grey jacket and red silk skirt, with a silver hip piece by Shaun Leane worn over the skirt.

At the end of the show, McQueen mooned the audience, which he later explained as a gesture of frustration with the high expectations and limited support given to him by the British Fashion Council and the press.

== Reception ==
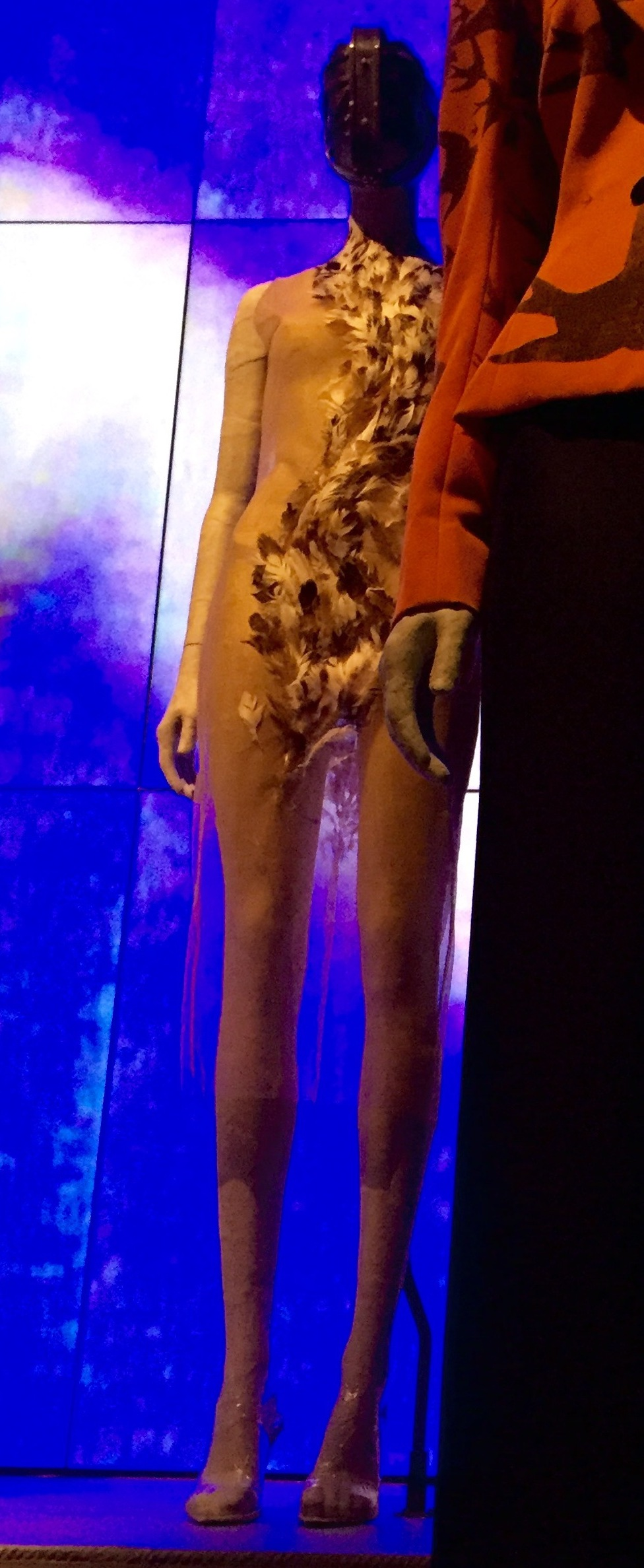
Look 58, a sheer feathered dress, as presented at Alexander McQueen: Savage Beauty at the Victoria and Albert Museum in London, 2015

The runway show for The Hunger was not well-received by industry personnel, especially in comparison to the success of Highland Rape, which had made McQueen's name as a designer. Richard Benson, former editor of The Face magazine, recalled the audience being unimpressed: "I distinctly remember the lights coming up at the end [...] and seeing fashion editors shaking their heads and tutting their disapproval". Few people came backstage to see McQueen, who was distraught over the reaction and assumed his career in fashion was over. Fashion editor Suzy Menkes went backstage to assure him that it was not. Sales numbers bore this out. By the next day, Women's Wear Daily (WWD) was reporting that "McQueen claimed to have already taken orders worth US$1.1 million" (approximately £700,000). In her 2015 biography of McQueen, Gods and Kings, journalist Dana Thomas reports that retail orders totalled £400,000 (approximately $630,000).

Author Andrew Wilson summarised the contemporary reception for the collection as "far from kind". Many journalists were divided between personal praise for McQueen and disappointment in the results. Colin McDowell at The Sunday Times praised McQueen's "wit and awareness", saying that he understood the rebelliousness of "new femininity", but felt the actual clothing was an "ill-thought-out mess" and said McQueen would need more time to develop his vision into reality. Iain R. Webb of The Times was similarly split; he thought McQueen "extremely clever" and possessed of "unique cutting skills", but was too deep in his "angry young man" persona. Sally Brampton at The Guardian felt the tailoring in The Hunger was an improvement over McQueen's previous two seasons, but wrote that he still needed to "curb some of his more childish tantrums" to be truly great. In The Daily Telegraph, Hilary Alexander called McQueen's tailoring "as precise as it was forward-looking". She complained of the amount of bared flesh models showed and said that McQueen "should not have bothered" mooning the audience, calling him a "pale, slightly chunky boy".

Despite their disappointment, some reviewers felt The Hunger was a bright spot in an underwhelming London Fashion Week. Both WWD and Amy Spindler of The New York Times felt that McQueen was one of only a few designers who had shown interesting collections. Brampton called the rest of the shows "bleak" compared to McQueen's. McDowell excoriated the season for lacking creativity, holding up McQueen as "spearheading the originality of thought" he felt British fashion needed. In a Sunday Telegraph review of the season's designs, Alexander was broadly critical, asking whether any of the young designers, including McQueen, were really producing fashion at all. Webb felt all the designers were trying too hard, and wished The Hunger "didn't hurt so much to watch".

Critics praised some aspects of the show, most prominently the collection's throwbacks to punk fashion of the 1980s: hair styled in spikes or Mohican haircuts, bare breasts on women, and earrings worn as singles rather than in pairs. Jane de Teliga at The Sydney Morning Herald noted that punk revival appeared to have "now become a tradition in English shows". Luella Bartley from the Evening Standard called the collection "neoteric punk that looked razor sharp instead of Johnny Rotten". Writing in the International Herald Tribune, Menkes highlighted McQueen's modernist use of lace – "laminated with car paint or sliced into abstract body-patterns". Spindler felt McQueen had drawn on his Savile Row tailoring to produce "the kinkiest, most fetishistic clothes on any runway". Some felt the collection showed McQueen's personal growth. Evening Standard journalist Alison Veness and the staff at WWD each found the collection more mature than Highland Rape. Veness felt that a younger McQueen would have covered the designs in blood to make his point, but in The Hunger, he had only "hinted at something nasty", demonstrating a newfound restraint. The staff writer at the Vancouver Sun suggested that McQueen was "stepping into the shoes of John Galliano".

There is no clear retrospective consensus on The Hunger. In her biography of McQueen, Judith Watt called it McQueen's first commercially-viable collection, but felt that it failed to balance artistic and commercial concerns, making it one of his weaker efforts. In Gods and Kings, Thomas described it as the "most commercial and accomplished" collection of McQueen's career to that point, but argues that the media was "getting tired of McQueen's bad boy antics".

== Analysis ==
Chloe Fox, in her book Vogue On: Alexander McQueen, connected The Hunger with McQueen's follow-up collection Dante (Autumn/Winter 1996). She saw them as examples of the kind of "fantastic and sinister visual worlds", full of sexuality and death, which McQueen created in his early career. Rebecca Arnold, analysing the interplay of sexuality and brutality in fashion for Fashion Theory, highlighted McQueen's early work as an example of this aesthetic. Of The Hunger, she felt that the models in their moulded bodices "seemed vampish, and contemptuous of the attention they attracted". She called this brutal aesthetic a "form of resistance" to mainstream fashion's reliance on unrealistic images of healthy, beautiful people.

Fashion historian Alistair O'Neill discussed The Hunger in an essay that analysed McQueen's reliance on film for inspiration. The Hunger, he felt, showcased McQueen's ability to translate tropes and themes from cinema into fashion, serving as "part commentary, part intervention". McQueen drew on another vampire film, Bram Stoker's Dracula (1992), for his untitled Autumn/Winter 2006 menswear collection.

The violent, sexualised styling McQueen deployed in his early career often resulted in the press accusing him of misogyny, and The Hunger was no exception. McQueen consistently objected to this characterisation. In an April 1995 interview following Highland Rape, he had said that he designed with his lesbian friends in mind, and was not attempting to appeal to most straight women. Responding to press accusations that the designs in The Hunger were misogynist, McQueen rebutted that most of the female models who walked in the show were lesbians.

=== Worm corset ===
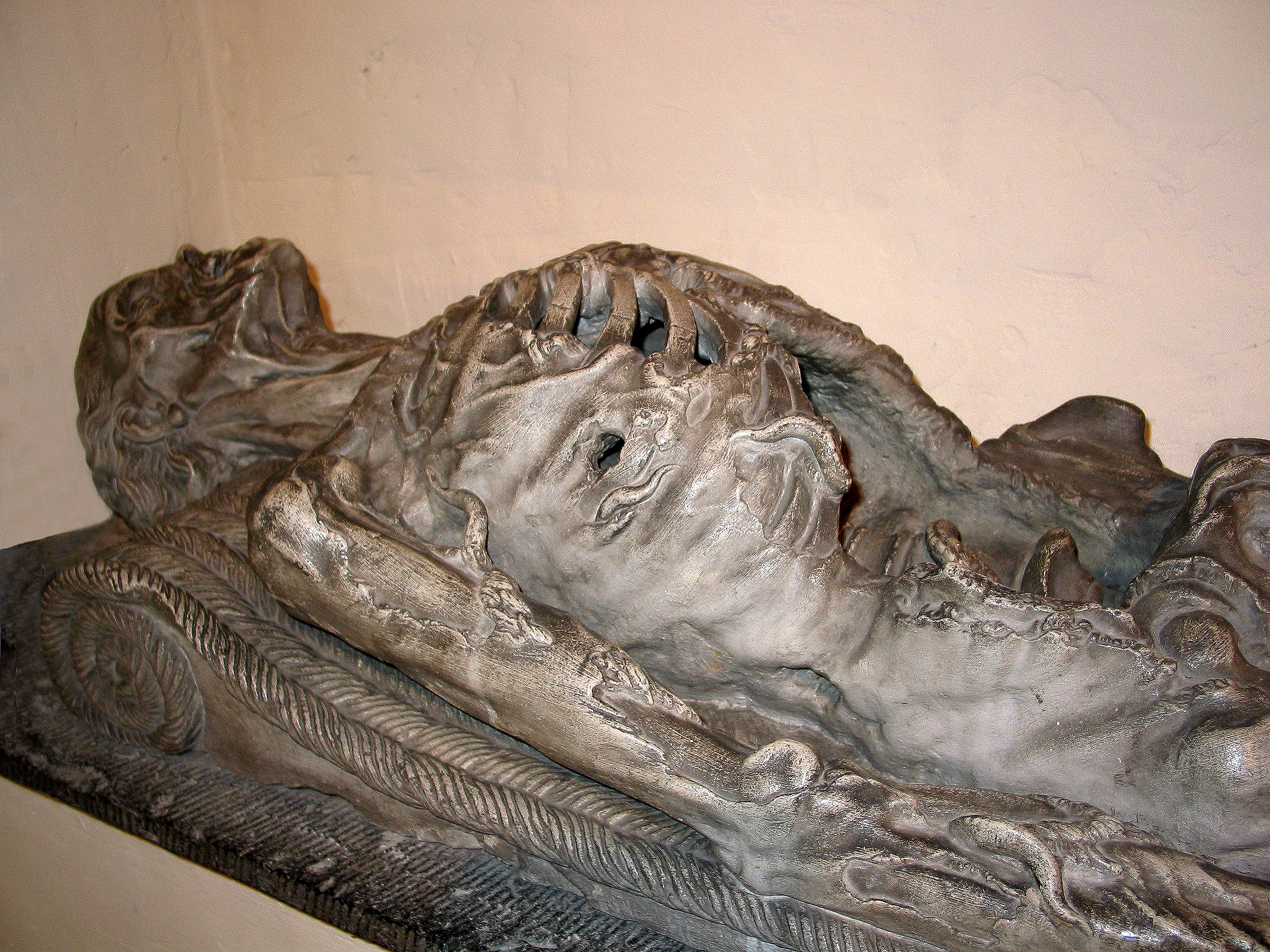
Cadaver monument depicting a man being eaten by worms, 16th century, in Boussu, Belgium

Much analytical attention has been given to the worm corset, and how it juxtaposes the desirable with the undesirable. Fashion theorist Caroline Evans analysed it as an example of how McQueen's runway models were "armoured through glamour". On the runway, the corset was styled with a tailored jacket whose shoulders and lapels were "drawn back like a surgical incision" to reveal the model's nude torso beneath. Evans found a visual resemblance to transi, or cadaver monuments, a form of tomb effigy which depicts a decayed corpse, but argued that the model's "aggressive vitality [...] asserts the right of the living to commandeer the iconography of the dead", which to her "suggests a robust defiance". She quotes Peter Stallybrass and Allon White to argue that the worm corset on the model produces "an image in which 'disgust ... bears the imprint of desire'". Similarly, author Ana Finel Honigman wrote that the corset turned "shock into enticement".

In an analysis of McQueen's Gothic leanings, Catherine Spooner pointed to the worm corset as one of his "most inherently Gothic garments". For her, the worms referenced Gothic themes of death, decay, and, with "their similarity to leeches, the vampires with which the collection was associated". She viewed the ensemble through the lens of the "abject", developed by cultural critic Julia Kristeva: the revulsion experienced during encounters with anything which "does not respect borders, positions, rules". Spooner felt that the corset played with bodily boundaries by framing the worms as both within and outside the body. Additionally, the tailored jacket and structured corset contrast with the random placement of the worms, juxtaposing "structure countered with chaos, [and] beauty with horror". Sociologist Henrique Grimaldi Figueredo refers to Spooner in his analysis of McQueen's runway shows, agreeing that the worm corset exemplified the abject as an "allusion of addlement of bodies".

== Legacy ==
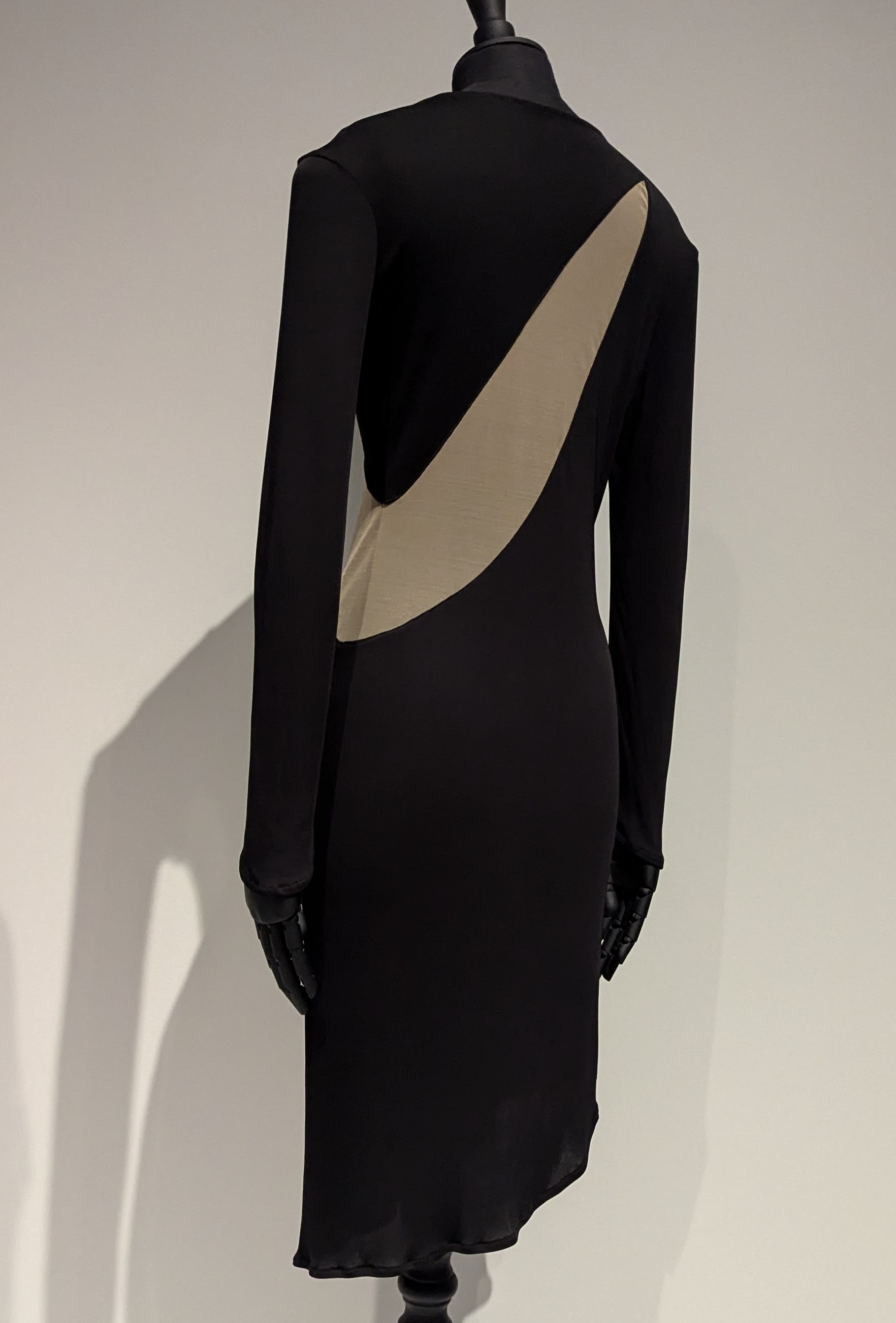
Black and white jersey slash dress, presented at Lee Alexander McQueen & Ann Ray - Rendez-Vous (2024)

Many people who began working with McQueen on The Hunger became regular collaborators. Sam Gainsbury went on to produce all of McQueen's runway shows with her partner Anna Whiting. Pons went to work for McQueen at Givenchy upon graduating from CSM in 1997, then transitioned to McQueen's own label, where he worked until 2000. Both Sean Leane and Philip Treacy worked regularly with McQueen until his death in 2010. For McQueen's Autumn/Winter 2006 collection The Widows of Culloden, Leane and Treacy collaborated on a jewelled headpiece adorned with bird wings. The Tusk earring design Leane created for The Hunger became a brand signature for his jewellery house. During the period in which their careers overlapped, fashion journalists continued to compare McQueen and Galliano, sometimes referring to them as rivals.

After the show, McQueen admitted to Ungless that he never had the money to pay him, but gave him a £1000 gift certificate to London boutique Browns. When Ungless attempted to use the certificate, staff advised him that it was stolen. Ungless, angry at the deception, told them McQueen had given it to him. McQueen felt that Ungless had damaged his reputation by doing so, and was irate. The two made up; Ungless told Wilson that they "started laughing about it" afterward.

McQueen returned to concepts developed for The Hunger throughout his career. The moulded bodice reappeared in many collections for his own label and for Givenchy. For the Givenchy haute couture Spring/Summer 1998 season, he showed a clear bodice filled with butterflies, which Caroline Evans likened to the worm corset from The Hunger. According to Kristin Knox, the full-face fencing mask displayed in Look 32 "came to be regarded as one of his trademarks" after similar styles appeared in later collections. McQueen's collaborator Sarah Burton, who became creative director of the label following his death, referenced the vertically-slashed chest of Look 35 in her final collection for the brand, for Spring/Summer 2024. She opened the runway show with a short corseted black dress, the chest slash unadorned. The slash appeared again in Look 37, embellished with gold embroidery. In her review for Vogue, Sarah Mower likened this version to a religious artefact and called it "almost a holy celebration of the ultimate creative power of the female body".

=== Exhibitions and ownership ===
The Metropolitan Museum of Art (the Met) in New York City owns the coat with orange feather print from Look 29. It also owns two other unspecified looks from the collection, a shirt and a skirt. The National Gallery of Victoria (NGV) in Australia owns Look 50, the mesh fencing-mask top with silver bumsters.

The worm corset and a Tusk earring by Shaun Leane appeared in both stagings of the retrospective exhibition Alexander McQueen: Savage Beauty, at the Met in 2011 and at the Victoria and Albert Museum in London in 2015. Look 58, a feathered sheer dress, was added for the second staging, which included 66 items that did not appear in the original. The jacket from Look 29 appeared in the Met's 2024 exhibition Sleeping Beauties: Reawakening Fashion.

== Bibliography ==
- Bolton, Andrew (2011). Alexander McQueen: Savage Beauty. New York City: Metropolitan Museum of Art. ISBN 978-1-58839-412-5. OCLC 687693871.
- Bolton, Andrew (2024). Sleeping Beauties: Reawakening Fashion. New York City: Metropolitan Museum of Art. ISBN 978-1-58839-777-5.
  - Frankel, Susannah. Introduction. In Bolton (2011), pp. 17–27.
- Breward, Christopher (2003). Fashion. Oxford: Oxford University Press. ISBN 978-0-19-158773-3.
- Callahan, Maureen (2014). Champagne Supernovas: Kate Moss, Marc Jacobs, Alexander McQueen, and the '90s Renegades Who Remade Fashion. New York City: Touchstone Books. ISBN 978-1-4516-4053-3.
- Elenowitz-Hess, Caroline (16 April 2022). "Reckoning with Highland Rape: Sexuality, Violence, and Power on the Runway". Fashion Theory. 26 (3): 399–417. doi:10.1080/1362704X.2020.1846325. ISSN 1362-704X. S2CID 229432510.
- Evans, Caroline (2003). Fashion at the Edge: Spectacle, Modernity and Deathliness. New Haven, Connecticut: Yale University Press. ISBN 978-0-300-10192-8.
- Fairer, Robert; Wilcox, Claire (2016). Alexander McQueen: Unseen. New Haven, Connecticut: Yale University Press. ISBN 978-0-300-22267-8. OCLC 946216643.
- Fox, Chloe (2012). Vogue On: Alexander McQueen. Vogue on Designers. London: Quadrille Publishing. ISBN 978-1849491136. OCLC 828766756.
- Gleason, Katherine (2012). Alexander McQueen: Evolution. New York City: Race Point Publishing. ISBN 978-1-61058-837-9. OCLC 783147416.
- Honigman, Ana Finel (2021). What Alexander McQueen Can Teach You About Fashion. London: Frances Lincoln. ISBN 978-0-7112-5906-5.
- Knox, Kristin (2010). Alexander McQueen: Genius of a Generation. London: A&C Black. ISBN 978-1-4081-3223-4. OCLC 794296806.
- Loschek, Ingrid (2009). When Clothes Become Fashion: Design and Innovation Systems. Oxford: Berg Publishers. doi:10.2752/9781847883681. ISBN 978-0-85785-144-4.
- Mora, Juliana Luna; Berry, Jess (2 September 2022). "Creative Direction Succession in Luxury Fashion: The Illusion of Immortality at Chanel and Alexander McQueen". Luxury. 9 (2–3): 117–140. doi:10.1080/20511817.2022.2194039. ISSN 2051-1817.
- Thomas, Dana (2015). Gods and Kings: The Rise and Fall of Alexander McQueen and John Galliano. New York City: Penguin Publishing. ISBN 978-1-101-61795-3. OCLC 951153602.
- Watt, Judith (2012). Alexander McQueen: The Life and the Legacy. New York City: Harper Design. ISBN 978-1-84796-085-6. OCLC 892706946.
- Wilcox, Claire, ed. (2015). Alexander McQueen. New York City: Abrams Books. ISBN 978-1-4197-1723-9. OCLC 891618596.
  - Bethune, Kate. "Encyclopedia of Collections". In Wilcox (2015), pp. 303–326.
  - Bolton, Andrew. "In Search of the Sublime". In Wilcox (2015), pp. 15–21.
  - Evans, Caroline. "Modelling McQueen: Hard Grace". In Wilcox (2015), pp. 189–201.
  - Frankel, Susannah. "The Early Years". In Wilcox (2015), pp. 69–79.
  - O'Neill, Alistair. "The Shining and Chic". In Wilcox (2015), pp. 261–280.
  - Spooner, Catherine. "A Gothic Mind". In Wilcox (2015), pp. 141–158.
- Wilson, Andrew (2015). Alexander McQueen: Blood Beneath the Skin. New York City: Simon and Schuster. ISBN 978-1-4767-7674-3. OCLC 1310585849.
