= Fashion theory =

Fashion theory may refer to:

- Theories of fashion
- Fashion Theory, academic journal
