= Taxi Driver (collection) =

1993 fashion collection by Alexander McQueen

McQueen's friend Alice Smith wearing a design from Taxi Driver in a photoshoot for The Daily Telegraph, corner inset of McQueen; March 1993

Taxi Driver is the second collection by British designer Alexander McQueen, released for the Autumn/Winter 1993 season of his eponymous fashion house. It was named after the 1976 film Taxi Driver, and his father, a London taxicab driver. McQueen developed the collection following his 1992 graduation from Central Saint Martins art school. At the time he was unemployed and seeking a job in the fashion industry; although he was reluctant to launch his own company, he worked on designs to pass the time. The collection included experimental techniques and silhouettes, most notably the bumster trouser, whose extremely low waist exposed the top of the intergluteal cleft.

In lieu of a traditional fashion show, Taxi Driver was exhibited in a room at The Ritz Hotel during London Fashion Week in March 1993. McQueen was one of six young designers funded by the British Fashion Council that year. Aided by magazine editor Isabella Blow, who took it upon herself to promote McQueen, the collection garnered positive reviews. When the exhibition ended, McQueen packed the clothing into bin bags, went clubbing, and left the bags hidden in the rubbish behind the club. When he returned the next day, all the rubbish bags had been removed. Nothing remains of the collection.

== Background ==
British designer Alexander McQueen (born Lee Alexander McQueen) was known in the fashion industry for his imaginative, sometimes controversial, designs and dramatic fashion shows. Over the course of his career, which lasted from 1992 until his death in 2010, he explored a broad range of ideas and themes, particularly sexuality, death, violence, romanticism, and historicism. The son of a London taxicab driver and a teacher, he grew up in one of the poorer neighborhoods in London's East End. He began his career in fashion as an apprentice with Savile Row tailors Anderson & Sheppard before briefly joining Gieves & Hawkes as a pattern cutter. His work on Savile Row earned him a reputation as an expert tailor.

In October 1990, at the age of 21, McQueen began the eighteen-month masters-level course in fashion design at Central Saint Martins (CSM), a London art school. McQueen met a number of his future collaborators at CSM, including Simon Ungless, with whom he later lived. He graduated with his master's degree in fashion design in 1992. His graduation collection, Jack the Ripper Stalks His Victims, was bought in its entirety by magazine editor Isabella Blow, who became his mentor and his muse.

== Creation of label and collection ==
=== Label ===
Following his graduation from CSM in 1992, McQueen's friends wanted him to start his own label. He was concerned about the difficulty involved in launching a new business, and was more interested in landing a job with an existing fashion house. He had interviews, but nothing came of them. At times, he worked as Blow's assistant, but mainly subsisted on unemployment benefits. In the meantime, he spent his time experimenting with designs, working closely with housemate Ungless, who was focused on prints. Eventually McQueen ended up with enough pieces to call a collection, decided to launch a small design label, and found himself in need of a name for his nascent company.

McQueen chose to design under his middle name, rather than his given name of Lee, resulting in the brand name Alexander McQueen. Blow was fond of taking credit for this decision, saying that Alexander was a more aristocratic-sounding name than Lee. McQueen claimed it was his idea to use a different name so that the unemployment benefits he was claiming as Lee McQueen would not get cut off. For the clothing tag, he re-used a concept from Jack the Ripper: clear plastic squares with locks of his own hair inside. This referenced the practice of Victorian-era prostitutes selling locks of hair as well as the general practice of people keeping a lock of hair as a memento or trophy.

=== Collection ===
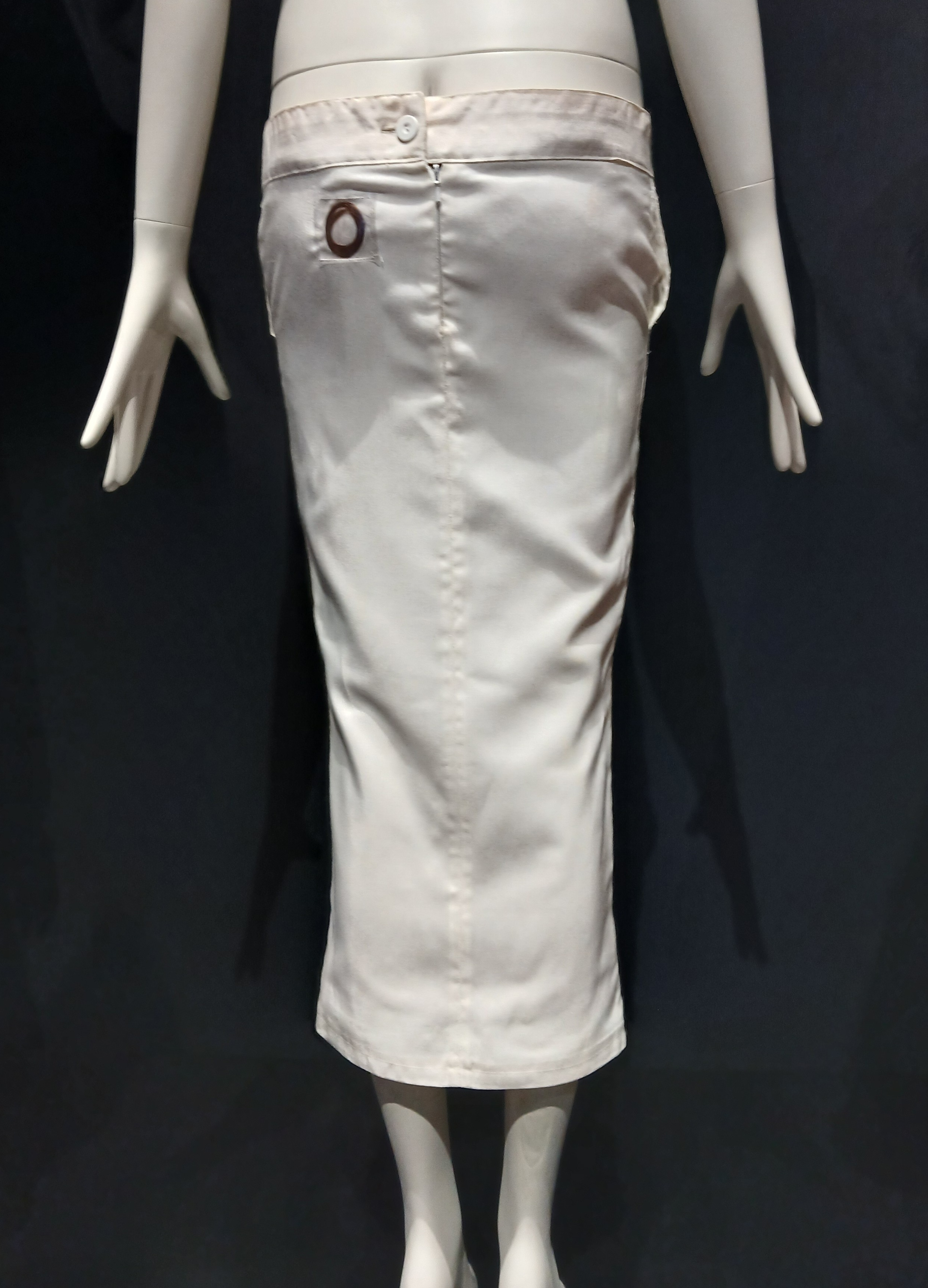
Bumster skirt with hair label from The Birds, at the exhibit accompanying the House of McQueen play, 2025

Taxi Driver comprised some 26 pieces: 13 brand-new designs, in addition to concepts reworked from Jack the Ripper and other miscellaneous items. Many designs featured the sharp tailoring that became a McQueen signature. The clothes in the collection were made with unconventional techniques and materials, partially because McQueen and Ungless could rarely afford to buy decent fabric. McQueen used liquid latex to finish the edges of some garments rather than sewing a hem. He made a tank top of two layers of a clear plastic shower curtain, with partridge feathers wedged inside. Another garment had feathers lined up vertically around the collar, obscuring the face. The feathers were supplied by Ungless, whose father was a gamekeeper. Ungless created a series of prints for the collection from photos of missing and murdered people, rendered in black and white on cheap cotton; this became a skater skirt and a top. He printed an image of Robert De Niro as Travis Bickle from the 1976 film Taxi Driver on grey taffeta, from which McQueen made a tailored jacket or vest. (Note: Thomas is American and refers to it as a "long vest". Wilson is British and refers to it as a jacket.)

The most significant concept in the collection is the bumster trouser, a brand-new design whose extremely low waist exposed the top of the intergluteal cleft. Creating a completely new silhouette is a rarity in fashion, and a significant achievement. McQueen later described the bumsters as an effort to demonstrate how the cut of a garment could radically change the appearance of the body. The other individual item of note was called the "Scarlet Pimpernel coat", priced at £800. This was a grey coatdress with a jewelled collar and a cut right down the back that showed the wearer's whole spine. The collar alone took two weeks of work.

The collection's title references both the film Taxi Driver and McQueen's taxicab driver father, although he only admitted to the latter much later. Andrew Groves, a fellow designer and early boyfriend of McQueen's, believed it was named to honour McQueen's father. Ungless dismissed this idea, recalling that the collection was named after the film, because he and McQueen thought "De Niro looked incredibly fuckable" as Travis Bickle.

== Sales efforts and exhibition ==
A collection designed solely around the female form and, by the use of proportion, accentuating parts of the woman's anatomy to create a new shape.

Hi-tech fabrics coincide with hi-tech visuals and combine with classics of bygone years such as fifties parallels, cut just above the ankle, and Korean line frock coats with Chesterfield collars, beaded with the scarlet pimpernel.

No restriction pure contortion.

— Alexander McQueen Taxi Driver overview

Blow had connections with fashion retailers, and she took him to various buyers hoping to secure orders. Joan Burstein, co-owner of Browns, a London boutique, recalled that the pieces were brought to her in a bin bag. She turned the clothing down, but told Blow that McQueen had talent worth working on. McQueen's friends Cressida Pye and Alice Smith, who had known him since 1992, had opened a fashion recruitment agency — essentially a matchmaking service that attempted to match designers with jobs at existing fashion houses. In an effort to promote McQueen's work to buyers, they held showings of Taxi Driver at their agency in Covent Garden in late February 1993. (Note: Bethune incorrectly reports that the collection was shown first at the Ritz and subsequently at Smith & Pye. The collection summary indicates that the Smith & Pye showings were in late February, and London Fashion Week was in early March. Furthermore, the collection is known to have been lost following the Ritz exhibit.)

Because of the slumping economy, few designers presented runway shows during London Fashion Week in early March 1993. The British Fashion Council provided funding for new designers to exhibit their collections at the Ritz Hotel in London in lieu of fashion shows, and McQueen was one of six successful applicants. Journalist Dana Thomas described the exhibition as "a bit of a ramshackle circus". McQueen had no money for staging, so the clothing was simply hung on whatever hangers he could find. He neglected his own appearance, meeting buyers and journalists in clothes that were torn or paint-splattered, and was often defensive when people made comments about the unusual designs. Once again, Blow took charge of promotion, corralling exhibition visitors into seeing McQueen's display.

Alice Smith wore a feather-collared bustier from the collection for a photo shoot with The Daily Telegraph in early March. On the taxi ride home, it shed feathers everywhere. Neither Smith nor McQueen wanted to deal with it, so she left it behind in the cab.

On the day the exhibition ended, McQueen and Ungless packed the garments up into bin bags. They went clubbing at King's Cross nightclub Man Stink to celebrate. Reluctant to pay the cloakroom fees, they hid the bags among the rubbish behind one the club, started drinking, and promptly forgot about them. By the time McQueen returned the next morning, rubbish collectors had removed everything. Nothing remains of the collection.

== Reception and legacy ==
Most fashion designers strive their entire career to come up with something "new" and never achieve it. McQueen did it in his first collection out of school.

— Dana Thomas, Gods and Kings

Lucinda Alford at The Observer wrote that the collection demonstrated McQueen's pattern-cutting skills with "some of the most interesting cuts around", and said that some of the garments, including the Scarlet Pimpernel coat, "could be works of art in their own right". She noted the combination of historicist references and futuristic concepts; McQueen relied on both throughout his career. Nilgin Yusuf at The Sunday Times said "McQueen is one of a new breed of British designers strong on craftsmanship and with a developing business sense who herald a renaissance in the much maligned British fashion industry." Iain R. Webb of The Times agreed, listing McQueen as one of a number of new designers whose "designs are unequivocably of today; their names should be world famous tomorrow".

Writing in 2009, fashion journalist Sarah Mower recalls the Taxi Driver collection as the moment British fashion started to recover from a slump that began with the Black Monday stock market crash of 1987. Curator Andrew Bolton remembered the bumster as "one of the garments that, very early on, would make his reputation as this provocateur". Journalist Susannah Frankel agreed; in a 2015 essay about McQueen's early years, she wrote that the collection "showcased many of the signature traits with which McQueen would make his name". Academic Chris McWade argued that Taxi Driver had been integrated into the mythology that surrounded McQueen: the complete loss of such an early collection "adds to the spectral quality and sense of loss that overarches his identity as a public figure".

When the Metropolitan Museum of Art began arranging the retrospective Alexander McQueen: Savage Beauty, they contacted Smith in the hope that she still owned the feathered bustier from the Telegraph shoot. Although nothing remains of the clothing, a collection overview and a price list from the archive of early McQueen employee Ruti Danan were auctioned in 2020. The overview sold for $250, while the price list sold for $2,505.

== Bibliography ==
- Callahan, Maureen (2014). Champagne Supernovas: Kate Moss, Marc Jacobs, Alexander McQueen, and the '90s Renegades Who Remade Fashion. New York City: Touchstone Books. ISBN 978-1-4516-4053-3.
- Bolton, Andrew (2011). Alexander McQueen: Savage Beauty. New York City: Metropolitan Museum of Art. ISBN 978-1-58839-412-5. OCLC 687693871.
  - Frankel, Susannah. Introduction. In Bolton (2011), pp. 17–27.
- Gleason, Katherine (2012). Alexander McQueen: Evolution. New York City: Race Point Publishing. ISBN 978-1-61058-837-9.
- Mora, Juliana Luna; Berry, Jess (September 2022). "Creative Direction Succession in Luxury Fashion: The Illusion of Immortality at Chanel and Alexander McQueen". Luxury. 9 (2–3): 117–140. doi:10.1080/20511817.2022.2194039. ISSN 2051-1817.
- Quinn, Bradley (2002). Techno Fashion. Oxford: Berg Publishers. ISBN 978-1-85973-599-2.
- Thomas, Dana (2015). Gods and Kings: The Rise and Fall of Alexander McQueen and John Galliano. New York City: Penguin Publishing. ISBN 978-1-101-61795-3. OCLC 951153602.
- Watt, Judith (2012). Alexander McQueen: The Life and the Legacy. New York City: Harper Design. ISBN 978-1-84796-085-6. OCLC 892706946.
- Wilcox, Claire, ed. (2015). Alexander McQueen. New York City: Abrams Books. ISBN 978-1-4197-1723-9. OCLC 891618596.
  - Bethune, Kate. "Encyclopedia of Collections". In Wilcox (2015), pp. 303–326.
  - Frankel, Susannah. "The Early Years". In Wilcox (2015), pp. 69–79.
- Wilson, Andrew (2015). Alexander McQueen: Blood Beneath the Skin. New York City: Simon and Schuster. ISBN 978-1-4767-7674-3.
