= Bluebird Garage =

Building in Chelsea, London, England

Coordinates: 51.4850°N 0.1755°W

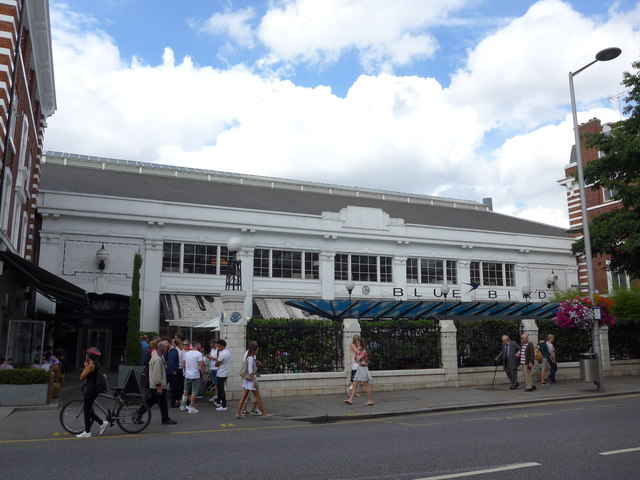
Bluebird Chelsea

Bluebird Chelsea, at 330–350 King's Road, Chelsea, London, is a Grade II-listed building that is now a noted D&D London restaurant and café, but which had its origins as a noted Art Deco garage complex built for the Bluebird Motor Company, which had connections with Sir Malcolm Campbell. Designed by Robert Sharp, the garage was built in 1923 and was claimed to be the largest in Europe at the time of its completion. In 1997, the building was converted by Sir Terence Conran's Conran Group into the "Bluebird Gastrodrome".

== Early history ==
The garage was built for the Bluebird Motor Company in 1923, designed to the very latest style by the architect Robert Sharp. At the time of its completion the garages were claimed to be the largest in Europe. At 50,000 sq ft (4,600 m^{2}), there was room for 300 cars in the main garage, a further 7,000 sq ft (650 m^{2}) was given over to workshops. On either side of the garage two further buildings contained lounges and writing rooms. The lounges were segregated for ladies, owners and chauffeurs.

The land speed record breaker Malcolm Campbell was connected with the Bluebird garage, initially holding the franchise for Itala and Ballot cars. He raced both of these marques, using this hobby as a form of advertising. In 1925 he also became the agent for the newly founded Chrysler company. As a racing driver he was less than impressed with Chrysler and imposed upon his long-suffering mechanic Leo Villa to wring just enough speed out of it to put up an impressive show at Brooklands. One of Campbell's maxims was, "Never trade with your own money. Always use that of others", which he demonstrated when the Bluebird garage folded in 1927. The shareholders (of whom Campbell wasn't one) lost their whole investment. He repeated this with another garage at St. James's in the 1930s, again losing none of his own money whilst the backers lost £25,000. His own racing garage at Brooklands, the "Campbell Shed" paid for from his own pocket, was more successful.

In later years the building was used as an ambulance station. From the late 1980s until the late 1990s the main building housed a fashion market called "Garage".

== Recent history ==
In 1997 the building was converted by Sir Terence Conran's Conran Group into the "Bluebird Gastrodrome", including a foodstore, chef shop, restaurant, bar, café and private dining rooms. The foodstore combined the skills and quality of specialists in bakery, butchery, greengrocery, fish and cheese mongers with the range of a supermarket. It also included specialist wine, coffee and confectionery sections. The garage area was later occupied by the Sainsbury's supermarket chain as an experimental "concept" shop. Sainsbury's withdrew from the space, which made way for "The Shop at Bluebird", a high-end clothes, furniture and book shop.
