= Fashion Theory =

- Discipline: Fashion
- Language: English
- Edited by: Valerie Steele

Publication details
- History: 1997-present
- Publisher: Routledge
- Frequency: 5/year

Standard abbreviations
- ISO 4: Fash. Theory

Indexing
- ISSN: 1362-704X (print); 1751-7419 (web)
- OCLC no.: 57378034

Links
- Journal homepage; Online access; Online archive

Fashion Theory: The Journal of Dress, Body & Culture is a peer-reviewed academic journal published by Routledge. Established in 1997, it covers the study of fashion, including aspects from sociology, art history, consumption studies, and anthropology. In the first editorial, the founding editor-in-chief Valerie Steele (The Museum at the Fashion Institute of Technology) stated that the journal approaches fashion "as the cultural construction of the embodied identity". The journal explores issues related to the body in society and also includes studies on practices of production, dissemination, and consumption of dress. Additionally, it features reviews of exhibitions and academic publications.

== See also ==
- Dress code
