= Eugene Souleiman =

British hairstylist

Eugene Souleiman is a British hairstylist. Described as "one of fashion’s most prolific hair stylists" by Another Magazine, he styled for celebrities including Lady Gaga and worked with prominent fashion houses like Prada, Alexander McQueen, Maison Margiela, Yohji Yamamoto, Celine, and Chanel

== Early life and education ==
Souleiman, born in South-East London, grew up on a council estate and initially attended art school before dropping out. He frequently experimented with his hair during his formative years, reflecting: "It was the done thing back then; you’d go to the chemist and buy three boxes of colour and all bleach each other’s hair. Blues, greens, purples, leopard print, stripes."

His interest in hair began in his teens, when he cut and colored friends' hair, inspired by punk DIY aesthetics. His first styling involved cropping a friend's black hair and adding an anarchy symbol, reflecting a focus on attitude over perfection. In 1982, shortly after being dismissed from Goldsmiths, Souleiman was guided towards hairdressing by a job centre advisor. He recalls that, based on his appearance—“I wasn’t normal looking; I was a punk rocker, wore lots of Westwood and had nuts hair”—or possibly the multiple-choice questionnaire he filled out, the advisor suggested he explore the craft, leading him to discover his passion for it.

Souleiman began an apprenticeship at the hotel Grosvenor House before moving to the more avant-garde Trevor Sorbie, a prominent stylist. He trained under Sorbie for nearly ten years.

== Career ==
The tension between fitting in and breaking convention has characterized much of Souleiman’s career. In the mid-1980s, he was not initially accepted by mainstream publications, claiming "Vogue wouldn't touch me". Instead, he found his creative niche with counterculture magazines such as i-D and The Face, collaborating with Corinne Day, Craig McDean, and Pat McGrath. Souleiman notes that, lacking affluence and connections, they relied on their ideas and consciously chose to reject previous trends, as they did not align with their own cultural values. Souleiman describes the shift from working with cult magazines like i-D and The Face to luxury brands as sudden rather than gradual. He recalls living in a one-bedroom flat in Woolwich with limited financial resources, often evading train fares and walking from London Bridge to work. Despite the lack of support, he felt compelled to continue, noting that Pat McGrath faced similar challenges.

Souleiman's career took off in 1995 with a significant campaign for Jil Sander, marking a pivotal moment in his professional life. Since then, he has become a sought-after stylist, working with major fashion brands such as Missoni, Prada, Yohji Yamamoto, Alexander McQueen, and Maison Margiela, with whom he had a notable four-year collaboration alongside John Galliano. His work also includes styling for Lady Gaga, Jeremy Scott, The Row, Dion Lee, Grace Wales Bonner, Thom Browne, and Calvin Klein.

In 2003, he joined the brothers Jake and Dinos Chapman to create a chess set at the Saatchi Gallery. In 2016, he created Björk's styling for the cover story of the Spring/Summer 2016 issue of AnOther Magazine.

Souleiman has created runway hair looks for Dolce & Gabbana, Dries Van Noten, Celine, Chanel, Chloé, Ann Demeulemeester, Louis Vuitton, Rick Owens, DSquared2, Kenzo, Lanvin, Issey Miyake, Stella McCartney, Viktor & Rolf, Valentino, and Hussein Chalayan, among others.

In 1998, Souleiman briefly worked at Toni & Guy before becoming co-creative director at Bumble and Bumble in 1999. He was later appointed as editorial director at Vidal Sassoon, a position he held until he was named creative director of Tecni.Art/L’Oréal Professionnel. He subsequently moved on to Wella Professional, where he serves as the Global Creative Director for Wella Professionals as of 2019.

Souleiman is celebrated for his innovative approach and risk-taking in the hairdressing industry. He is recognized for his versatility and creativity, ranging from futuristic to minimalist styles. He cites individuals such as John Galliano, Yohji Yamamoto, Pat McGrath, and Craig McDean as his greatest inspirations.

He created hair designs for the 2022 film Medusa Deluxe, a dark comedy set in the world of competitive hairdressing, his first film credit, for which he received the 2022 Winner British Independent Film Award for Best Makeup & Hair Design. "I've always wanted to do a film, always," Souleiman told Showstudio. "And to be honest with you, I can't think of a more perfect film for me."

Souleiman regularly contributes to publications such as Dazed and Confused, i-D, W, Harper’s Bazaar, Another Magazine, Arena, Numero, V Magazine, L’Uomo Vogue, and The New York Times.

== Personal life ==
As of 2016, Souleiman is married and has two children.
