= Susannah Frankel =

British fashion journalist and writer

Susannah Frankel is a British fashion journalist and writer who, since the 1980s, has worked with a number of newspapers and publications. She was the leading journalist chosen by the Fashion Museum, Bath, to choose the defining Dress of the Year of 1999. Since 2001, she has also written and co-written a number of books on fashion designers.

== Career ==
Frankel studied English at Goldsmiths, University of London, She then joined an art and architecture publishers, Academy Editions, where she was assistant to the editorial director. In the late 1980s she became deputy editor of BLITZ and stayed there until its forced closure in 1991.

From 1996 to 1999, Frankel was fashion editor for The Guardian, and then moved to the same role at The Independent, where she worked until 2012 when she became fashion director for the UK edition of Grazia. She also worked as fashion director for AnOther since its 2001 launch. In November 2015 it was reported that from January 2016, Frankel would be editor-in-chief of AnOther. Frankel has also contributed to Dazed & Confused since 1998. When Alexandra Shulman announced in 2017 that she was stepping down as editor of British Vogue, it was speculated that Frankel might be a contender to succeed her due to her experience and the inclusivity of her vision.

In 1999, Frankel was the fashion journalist selected by the Fashion Museum, Bath, to pick out the most representative look for that year for their Dress of the Year collection. Her choice was an Alexander McQueen lace dress with a moulded leather neck-brace.

== Books ==
Alongside her journalistic work, Frankel has contributed to a number of publications on various designers such as Hussein Chalayan, Peter Jensen, Martin Margiela, Alexander McQueen, Dries van Noten, Viktor & Rolf, and Yohji Yamamoto. Her first book, Visionaries, which was published by the Victoria and Albert Museum in 2001, was a collection of her interviews with designers.

Frankel was a close and supportive friend of Alexander McQueen from the beginning of his career. She wrote a lengthy introduction-cum-biography for the Metropolitan Museum of Art's publication for their McQueen retrospective, Savage Beauty. She also wrote about McQueen's formative years as a designer in an essay for the book accompanying the Victoria and Albert Museum's subsequent exhibition on the designer. She also collaborated with the photographer Nick Waplington on a book charting the development of McQueen's Autumn/Winter 2010 collection, The Horn Of Plenty. Titled Alexander Mcqueen: Working Process, the book was published to coincide with an exhibition of Waplington's images of McQueen's work at the Tate Britain in the spring of 2015.

=== Selected bibliography ===
- Visionaries: interviews with fashion designers (2001, V&A ISBN 9781851773701)
- The House of Viktor & Rolf, by Caroline Evans and Susannah Frankel (2008, Merrell: ISBN 9781858944609)
- Stephen Jones (2016, Rizzoli International Publications: ISBN 9780847848799)
