= Andrew Wilson (author) =

British writer (born 1967)

- Born: 1967 (age 58–59); Oswaldtwistle, Lancashire, England
- Education: King's College London; City, University of London
- Occupations: Biographer, novelist, journalist
- Writing career
- Notable awards: Edgar Award (2003); Lambda Literary Award (2003)
- Website: www.andrewwilsonauthor.co.uk

Andrew Wilson (born 1967) is a British biographer, novelist and journalist.

Wilson was born in Oswaldtwistle, Lancashire, on 6 June 1967 and read English Literature at King's College, London, graduating in 1988. He studied for the post-graduate diploma in periodical journalism at City University, London.

== Publications ==
Wilson is the author of Beautiful Shadow: A Life of Patricia Highsmith (Bloomsbury, 2003), The Man Who Invented Sex: A Life of Harold Robbins (Bloomsbury, 2007), The Lying Tongue (Canongate in UK, Atria in US, 2007), Shadow of the Titanic: The Extraordinary Stories of Those Who Survived (Simon & Schuster, 2012), Mad Girl's Love Song: Sylvia Plath and Life Before Ted (Simon & Schuster in UK, Scribner in the US, 2013), Alexander McQueen: Blood Beneath the Skin (Simon & Schuster, 2015).

Wilson has also written a series of novels featuring Agatha Christie as a character. These include:

- A Talent for Murder, about the real-life disappearance of Agatha Christie in 1926 (Simon & Schuster, 2017)
- A Different Kind of Evil (Simon & Schuster, 2018)
- Death in a Desert Land (Simon & Schuster, 2019)
- I Saw Him Die (Simon & Schuster, 2020)

Writing under the pseudonym E.V. Adamson, he is the author of the psychological thriller Five Strangers.

Wilson's journalism has appeared in the Observer, the Guardian, the Sunday Times, Independent on Sunday, Daily Telegraph, and Tatler. He is also a creative writing mentor on the Gold Dust scheme.

== Awards ==
- John Willis Memorial Prize for investigative journalism, 1989, City University.
- Edgar Allan Poe Award for best critical biography for Beautiful Shadow, 2003.
- LAMDA Literary Award for biography for Beautiful Shadow, 2003.
