= Natural Dis-tinction Un-natural Selection =

2009 fashion collection by Alexander McQueen

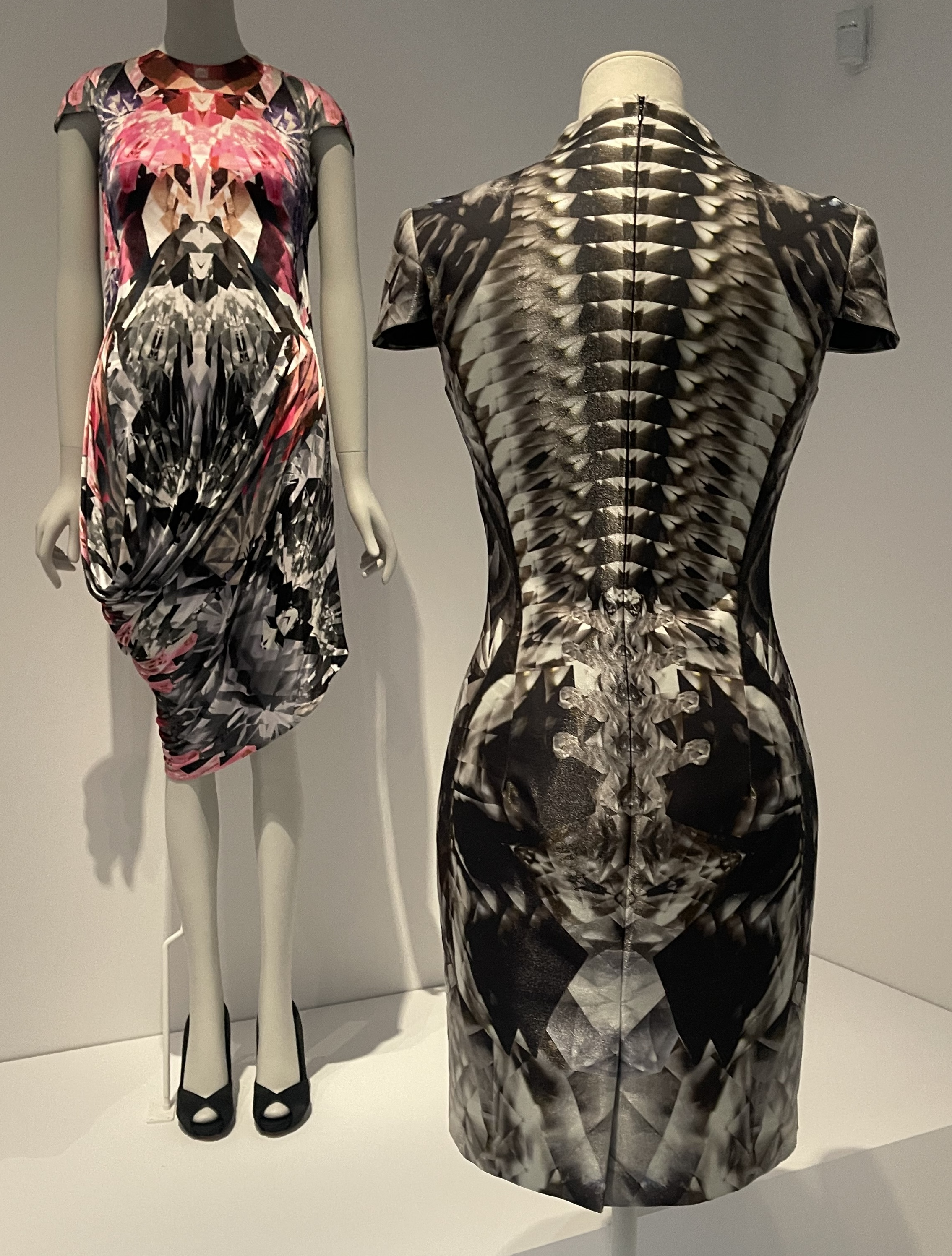
Digitally printed minidresses from the collection presented at the Alexander McQueen: Mind, Mythos, Muse exhibition at Musée national des beaux-arts du Québec, 2023

Natural Dis-tinction Un-natural Selection is the thirty-third collection by British fashion designer Alexander McQueen, released for the Spring/Summer 2009 season of his eponymous fashion house. The collection reflected McQueen's concerns about human impact on the environment, while drawing inspiration from the work of naturalist Charles Darwin. Natural Dis-tinction is known for its pioneering use of digital prints, which were engineered to match the patterns of their garments.

Two distinct phases of designs contrasted the beauty of the environment with the impact of human industry. The first phase used soft colours, organic motifs, and flowing lines to present an image of nature unspoiled by man. The second featured prints manipulated to look unnaturally perfect, some designs being in artificially bright colours and others in black and white. Across both phases, McQueen presented both classical and experimental silhouettes. Forty-one looks were presented at the collection's runway show, which was staged on 3 October 2008 at the Cent Quatre building in Paris, a community centre that was once a mortuary. The catwalk was framed by two lines of exotic taxidermied animals; a large round screen at the rear of the stage showed projections of celestial bodies and McQueen's own eyeball.

Contemporary critical response was somewhat mixed, journalists preferring the more romantic first half of the show. Some were disappointed at the lack of runway theatrics for which McQueen had been known. McQueen continued to explore environmental themes and digital prints in his following two collections; he is credited with popularising the use of such prints in fashion. Ensembles from Natural Dis-tinction are held by several museums and have appeared in exhibitions such as the McQueen retrospective Alexander McQueen: Savage Beauty.

== Background ==
British fashion designer Alexander McQueen was known for his imaginative, sometimes controversial designs, and dramatic fashion shows. Over the course of his career, which lasted from 1992 until his death in 2010, he explored a broad range of ideas and themes, particularly sexuality, death, violence, romanticism, and historicism. He learned tailoring as an apprentice on Savile Row, and dressmaking as head designer at French fashion house Givenchy. (Note: From October 1996 to October 2001, McQueen was simultaneously head designer at Givenchy and at his own label.) Although he worked in ready-to-wear – clothing produced for retail sale – his showpiece designs featured a degree of craftsmanship that verged on haute couture.

McQueen's personal fixations had a strong influence on his work. He incorporated his love of animals and the environment throughout his career by using organic materials and making visual references to nature. He was fascinated with taxidermy, and owned several pieces, including stuffed alligator heads and a whole polar bear. Preserved animals and animal parts had appeared in many previous collections: It's a Jungle Out There (Autumn/Winter 1997) had jackets with horns and crocodile heads, and Voss (Spring/Summer 2001) featured a dress made with taxidermied hawks positioned as though attacking the model. Death was another of his obsessions, and skull imagery had been a brand signature since What a Merry-Go-Round (Autumn/Winter 2001).

In the final years of his career, McQueen became increasingly concerned about human activity damaging the natural world. He felt that humans were beginning to overpower nature and were "in danger of killing the planet through greed", which would lead to the extinction of life on earth. Variations on these ideas formed the basis for his last three completed collections.

== Concept and collection ==
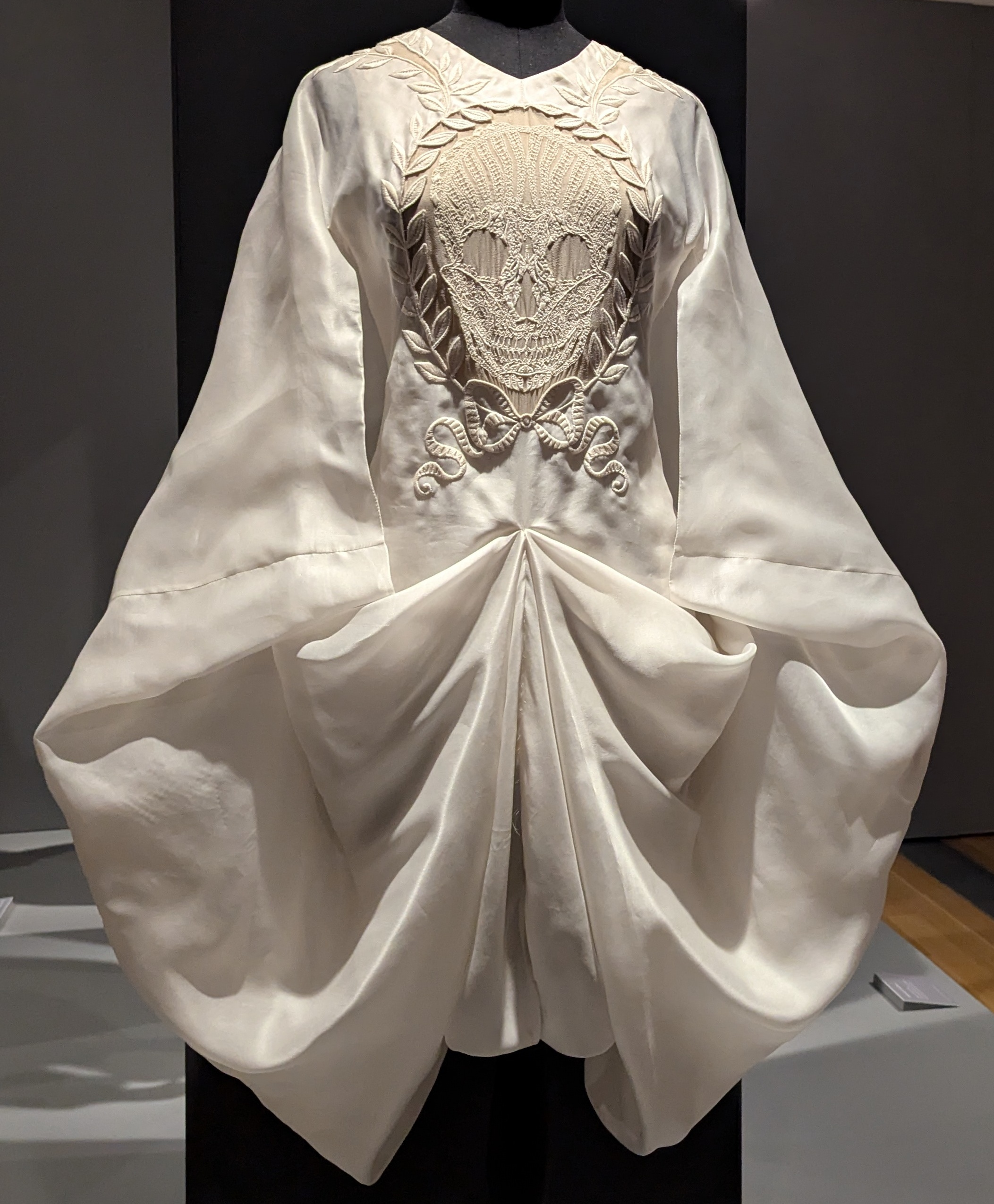
Look 7 at Lee Alexander McQueen & Ann Ray – Rendez-Vous (2024)

Natural Dis-tinction Un-natural Selection (Spring/Summer 2009) is the thirty-third collection McQueen made for his eponymous fashion house. According to the show's program notes, McQueen drew inspiration from the theory of natural selection as described by Charles Darwin in his seminal 1859 work On the Origin of Species. Natural Dis-tinction is known for its pioneering use of digital prints, which were engineered to match the patterns of their garments, rather than the usual practice of the pattern being cut to accommodate an existing print. The collection's prints were derived from natural materials, in the latter half manipulated to appear kaleidoscopic. Two distinct phases of designs contrasted the beauty of nature with the impact of human industry.

The first portion of the collection visually referenced unspoiled nature using soft colours, natural materials like leather, delicate embroidery, loose fringe, and flowing, organic shapes. Prints in this section were floral or derived from wood grain in light shades of brown. Many designs featured embroidered floral motifs or fabric flowers. In some, the flowers were set beneath transparent tulle, evoking scientific specimens kept beneath glass, as was common in the Victorian era. The brand's signature skull motif appeared on the front of a white minidress in Look 7.

In the second half of the collection, inspiration shifted to the industrial and modern, with two contrasting colour schemes. Some designs had patterns in artificially bright colours; the rest were in shades of black and white. The prints in this section were still mainly derived from nature – flowers, crystals, and bones – but were digitally manipulated to look unnaturally angular and symmetrical. McQueen described the prints as organic in nature but "enhanced, synthetic – touched by man". Other prints were based on buildings such as the Eiffel Tower, or a mountain taken from a photograph by Dan Holdsworth. Artificial and structured textiles predominated: Lycra for leggings and dresses, and bonded leather dyed black, calling to mind fetish wear. Some dresses and jumpsuits were encrusted with minerals; the final look was a jumpsuit covered with pieces of real amber.

Across the collection, the silhouettes were both classical and experimental. The garments were designed to fit an antique Victorian era mannequin, leading to what Susannah Frankel called a "slightly truncated hourglass silhouette". Wearable items like leggings and shift dresses hinted at McQueen's efforts to keep the collection viable for retail sales. Despite this, McQueen's characteristic tailoring appeared in precisely cut minidresses, frock coats, and slim trouser suits. High Edwardian collars and leg-of-mutton sleeves showcased his ever-present historicist tendencies, as did designs that appeared to reference The Tailor's Pattern Book (1589) by Spanish mathematician Juan de Alcega.

McQueen had become known for playing with the silhouette by cutting or structuring garments to produce unusual shapes, and he returned to these ideas in Natural Dis-tinction. The collection's more experimental designs exaggerated the wearer's body beyond natural human proportions, with cinched waists and padded shoulders and hips. Intricately folded fabric created cocoon dresses that surrounded the body. Other short dresses had structured, rounded skirts resembling bell jars.

== Runway show ==
=== Staging and design ===
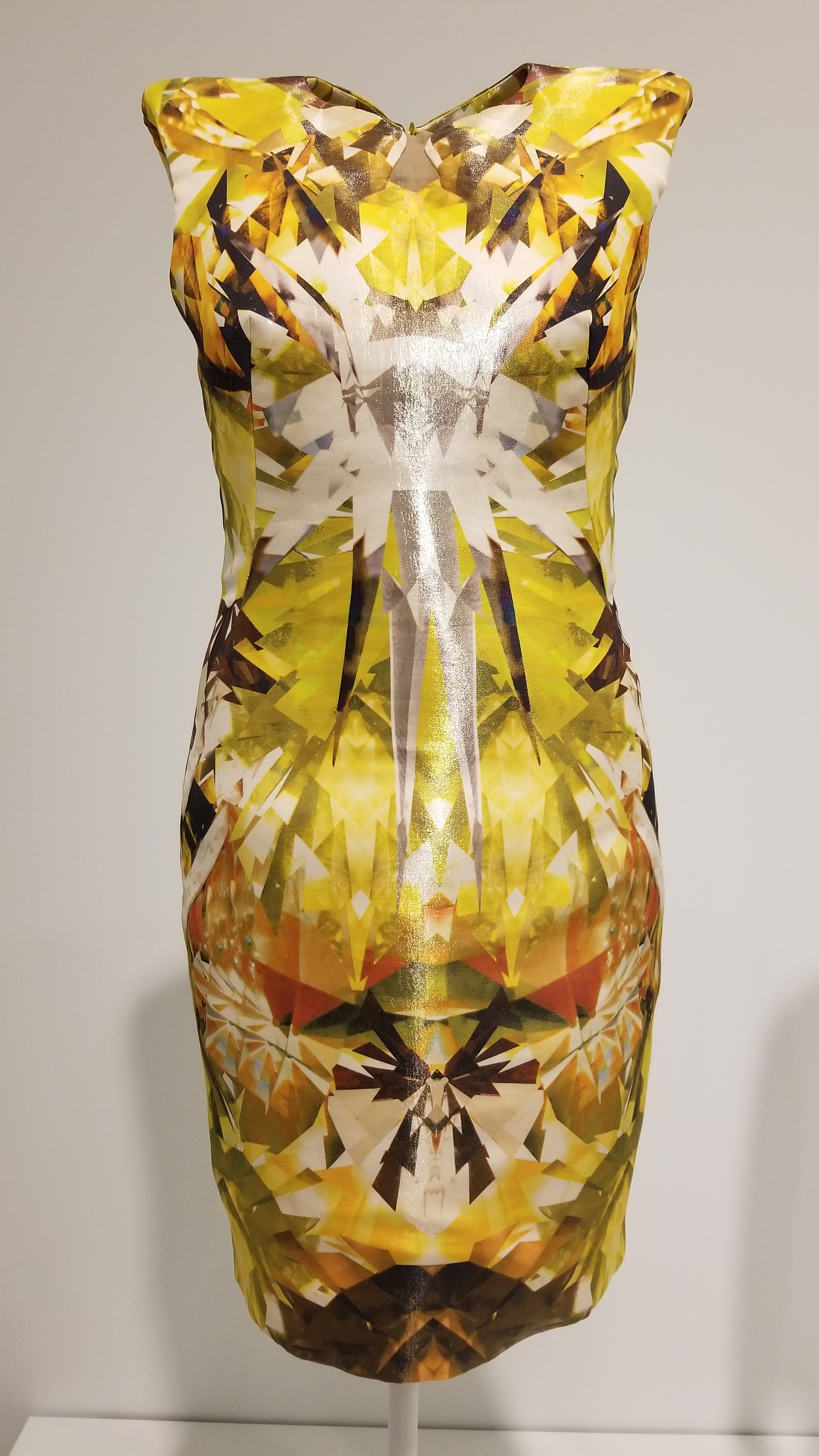
Look 24 as presented at Fashion Fictions at the Vancouver Art Gallery (2023)

The runway show was staged on 3 October 2008 at the Cent Quatre building in Paris, a community centre that was once a mortuary. The invitation featured a lenticular portrait of McQueen that transformed into a skull. McQueen's nephew, Gary McQueen, who worked as a menswear assistant with the company, had created the skull image as a print for the menswear line. McQueen decided he wanted to use it instead and had his nephew rework it into the shifting image for the invite.

McQueen typically worked with a consistent creative team for his shows. Overall styling was handled by Tabitha Simmons, and Gainsbury & Whiting were responsible for production. Joseph Bennett returned for set design. Hair was styled by Paul Hanlon, make-up by Peter Philips. Models were styled with see-through hairnets used as veils over their heads and faces. Author Chloe Fox felt they provided a "foetal sameness" as though the models were freshly born specimens of a "new breed".

The catwalk was framed by two lines of exotic taxidermied animals, including an elephant, giraffe, and several large cats. Accordingly, the show opened with a soundtrack of animal noises – roaring, hoofbeats, and elephant calls – before transitioning to electronic dance music. A large round screen at the rear of the stage featured projections of the Earth, the moon, and the sun, and McQueen's own eyeball. McQueen's typical runway theatrics were absent.

=== Show ===
Forty-one looks were presented in roughly two phases. The first dozen looks were a mixture of minidresses and trouser ensembles featuring wood grain print and floral elements, including the dresses with the flowers set beneath sheer tulle. Abbey Lee Kershaw, wearing a leather corset for Look 8, fainted as she came off the runway, which her agent blamed on the tight garment. This set of outfits was followed by a pair of minidresses made from fringe, Looks 14 and 15. Look 16 was a brown bodysuit worn under a long patterned coat with sharply pointed shoulders; critics compared its silhouette to that of a manta ray or an alien life form. The phase closed with a trio of minidresses covered with metallic enamel flowers, contrasting the softness of the preceding items.

The second half of the show opened with a short series of tailored minidresses, and one trouser suit, in brightly coloured patterns based on crystals. From Look 27, the tailored patterned minidresses and trouser suits continued, but the show transitioned to a mostly black and white palette, with prints now based on bones and architectural elements. This series was interspersed with tailored leather items, mostly minidresses. The final four looks were a series of dresses and jumpsuits encrusted with minerals. The last jumpsuit was covered with pieces of real amber. After the models took their final turn, McQueen came out to take his bow in a rabbit costume.

== Reception ==
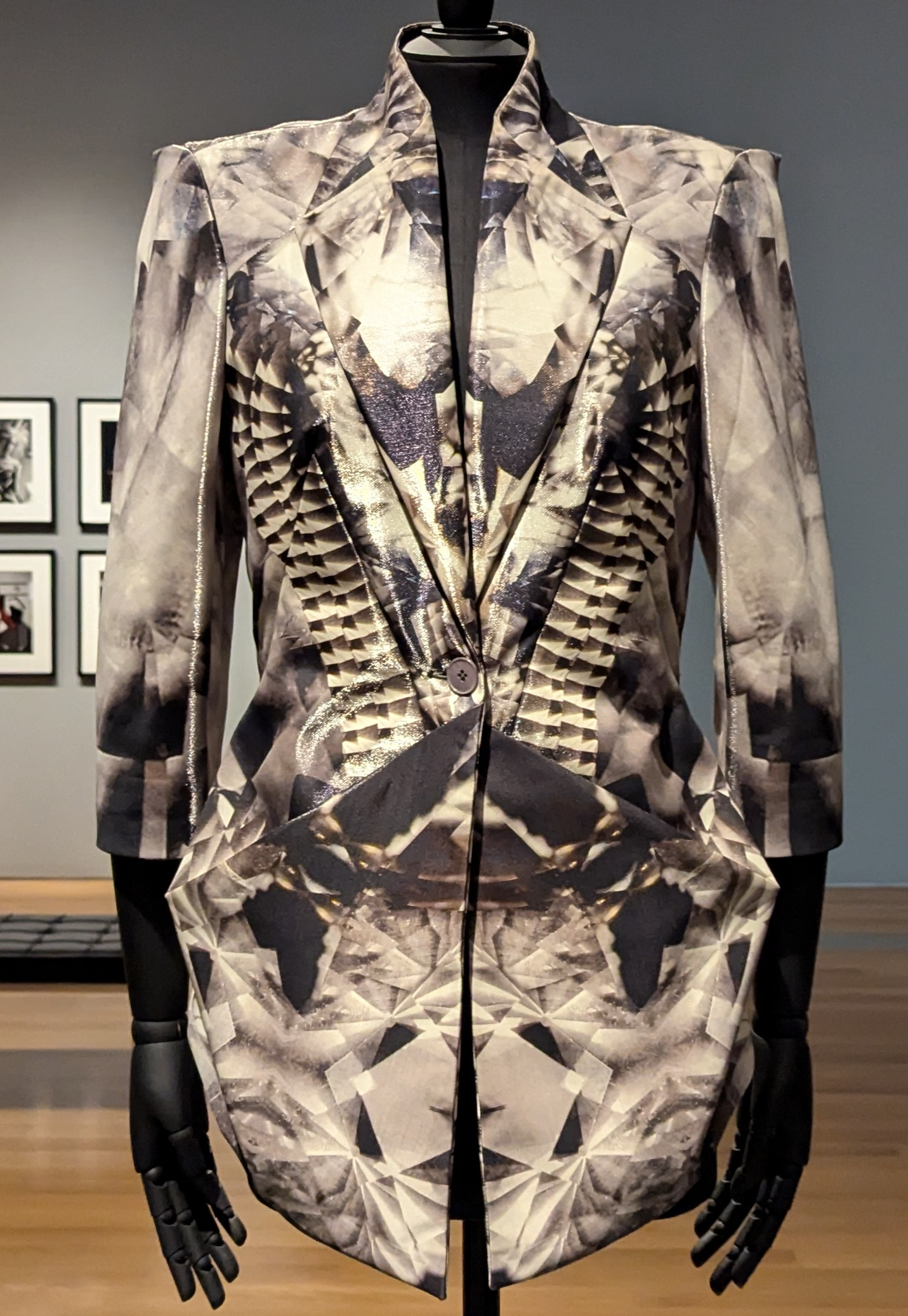
Look 30 at Rendez-Vous

Critical reception for Natural Dis-tinction was somewhat mixed. Critics generally preferred the first half of the collection. The colourful, complicated prints were seen as a highlight. Some reviewers were disappointed with the lack of runway performance art, which they had come to expect from McQueen. Despite this, the staff writer for Women's Wear Daily (WWD) considered the show a strong one with a "stunning" set and called it "among the most intriguing in a lackluster season". Anne Slowey of Elle reported that the industry was "charmed" by McQueen's appearance in the rabbit suit. McQueen drew criticism for Kershaw's fainting incident.

Writing for The New York Times, Cathy Horyn regarded the collection as "drivingly contemporary" despite the historical silhouettes and concepts that it referred back to. Sarah Mower of Vogue described the execution as "romantic" and highlighted the fringed designs as "two of the season's most sublime". Jess Cartner-Morley of The Guardian felt the best designs were those which balanced "pretty and menacing" elements. The minidresses which featured silk flowers beneath layers of see-through mesh were favourites for several critics.

Several critics noted the adherence to McQueen's typical tailored shapes, especially his signature frock coats. Mower thought the choice to produce a colourful collection with "eased-up tailoring" was intended to promote sales, which she thought would succeed at retail. Susannah Frankel felt McQueen's workmanship had been improving each season, citing the embroidery, fabric choices, and digital prints. Joelle Diderich for the Associated Press described the hourglass dresses as a "radical silhouette"; the reviewer for Le Monde found them chicly reminiscent of the work of Cristóbal Balenciaga.

The environmentalist theme attracted mixed commentary. Some journalists, such as Menkes and fashion editor Robin Givhan, felt the theme was admirable. Writing for The Independent, Frankel described Natural Dis-tinction as the most fully realised exploration of an environmental theme that ran through the entire Spring/Summer 2009 season. She called the collection proof that conceptual fashion could still be light and commercially viable. Eugenia de la Torriente, writing in El País, found the designs sufficiently novel to make up for what she felt was an unoriginal theme. Givhan disagreed, wishing the designs, particularly in the second half, were more memorable.

Several journalists were surprised that the environmental message did not lead to the kind of dark, angry collection that McQueen was known for. Booth Moore from the Los Angeles Times described the designs as "surprisingly tame" given the theme and stage setting. Cartner-Morley considered McQueen's anti-extinction statements ironic given his use of real animal materials like fur and reptile skin. Menkes felt McQueen was relying too much on skull motifs, a brand standard. David Graham at the Toronto Star argued that the skeletal and crystal prints successfully reinforced the "survival-of-the-fittest theme".

Despite the mixed contemporary reception, authors have retrospectively considered the collection's ideas intriguing. Andrew Wilson, one of McQueen's biographers, felt the clothes presented "the look of an alternative species, something that might have stepped from a space-age Noah's Ark". Chloe Fox wrote that the "thoroughly modern looks cemented McQueen's reputation as a sartorial soothsayer, a man with a passionate commitment to the evolution of fashion".

== Analysis ==
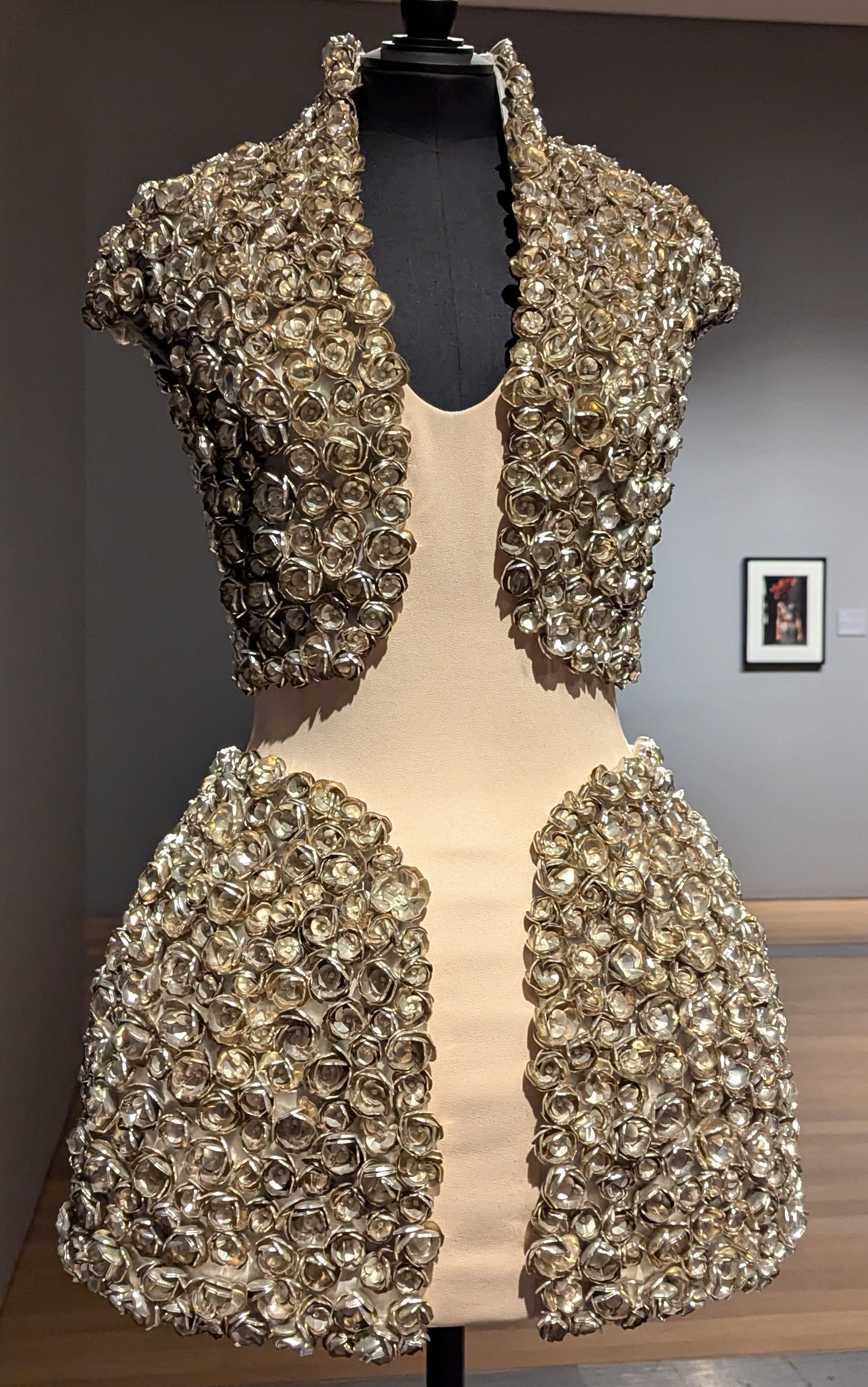
Look 18, one of the bell jar dresses, at Rendez-Vous

Wilson took the rabbit costume as a possible reference to Donnie Darko (2001), in which a man in a rabbit suit predicts the end of the world. Watt likened it to the genetically engineered monster rabbit that causes chaos in the animated film Wallace & Gromit: The Curse of the Were-Rabbit (2005).

According to O'Neill, McQueen claimed that the skull design was based on the desiccated head of Mrs. Bates seen in the film Psycho (1960), although he notes that this contradicts the actual origin of the image. (Note: McQueen was a cinemaphile who frequently referenced his favourite films in his work.) O'Neill suggested that the Psycho reference indicated that McQueen was marking the collection as being of an "unnatural order", given the perverse posthumous relationship between Mrs. Bates and her son Norman Bates. In an essay about McQueen's use of death symbolism, Eleanor Townsend cited the skull image from the Natural Dis-tinction invitation as an example of the designer's awareness of his own mortality.

Fashion journalist Alex Fury argued that Natural Dis-tinction was an example of McQueen expressing his vision "through the bodies of his models" in conjunction with the stripped-down set dressing. The clothing, with its exploration of evolution and nature, is contrasted with the backdrop of the taxidermy animals. Diana Villanueva Romero analysed McQueen's work from an ecofeminist perspective, identifying Natural Dis-tinction as an evolution of McQueen's longstanding tendency to present women as female-animal hybrids. Initially he did so for aesthetic reasons, but with Natural Dis-tinction, he began to use these transformations as social commentary.

Researcher Lisa Skogh noted that McQueen often incorporated concepts and objects which might have appeared in a cabinet of curiosities – collections of natural and historical objects that were the precursor to the modern museum. She identified the taxidermied animals lining the runway as part of this tradition, likening them to "a re-created Garden of Eden".

== Legacy ==
McQueen continued to explore the impact of humanity on nature in his next two collections. The Horn of Plenty (Autumn/Winter 2009) concerned wastefulness in the fashion industry and Plato's Atlantis (Spring/Summer 2010), his final completed collection, envisioned a flooded post-climate change world. Considering the collections in retrospect, Wilcox wrote that Natural Dis-tinction clearly "foreshadowed" its "exceptionally innovative" successor, Plato's Atlantis, which had similar dresses with colourful, digitally worked patterns.

Natural Dis-tinction prompted a trend for printed Lycra garments such as leggings, which reappeared in his next collections and were imitated by other brands. McQueen is credited with popularising the use of digitally engineered prints in fashion, beginning with this collection. He continued to experiment with this novel technique in his remaining collections.

=== Media and celebrity wear ===
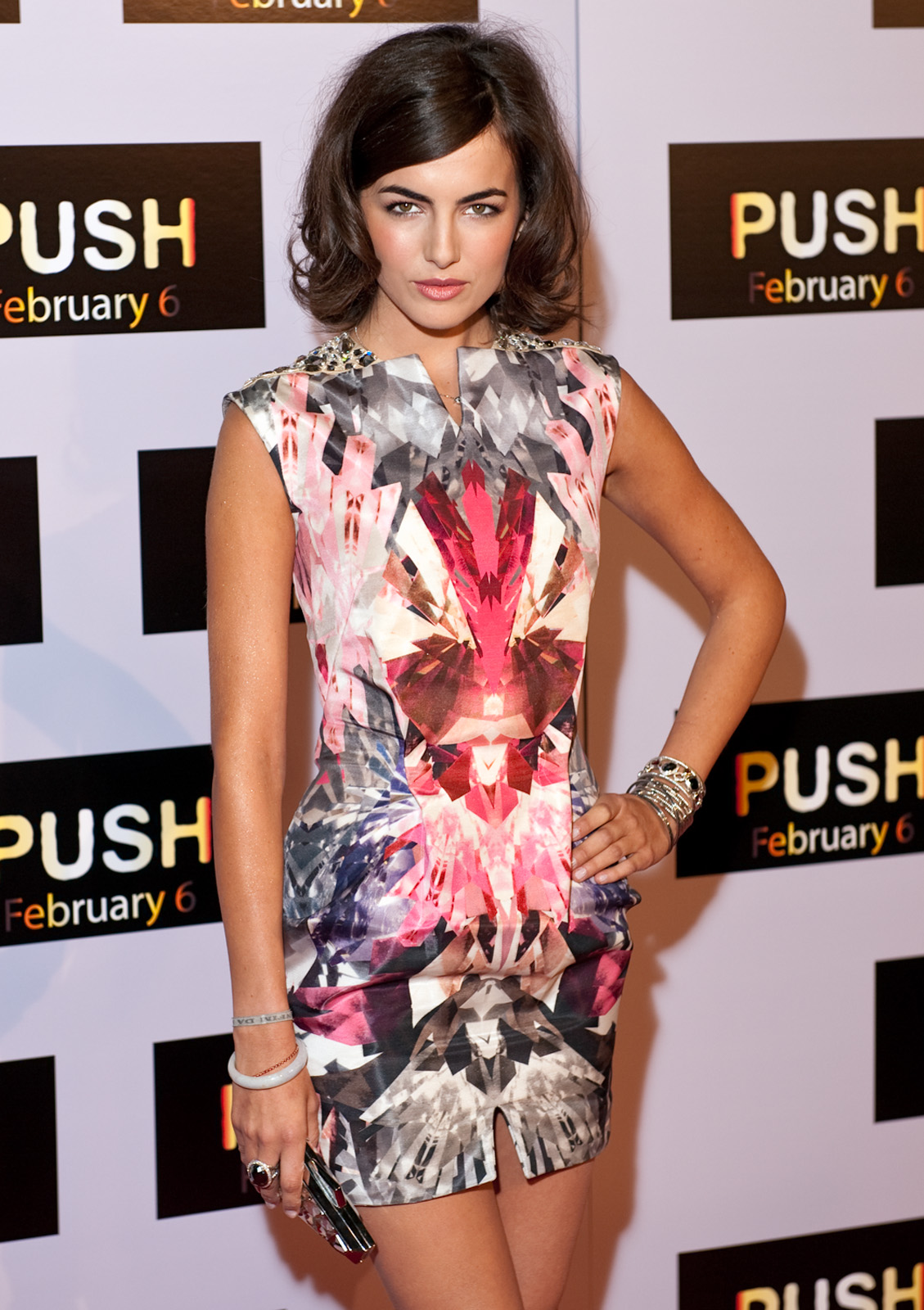
Actress Camilla Belle wearing Look 23

Actress Cate Blanchett wore a version of Look 39, one of the crystal-covered bell jar dresses, to the Los Angeles premiere of the film The Curious Case of Benjamin Button (2008). Actress Camilla Belle wore Look 23 to the Los Angeles premiere of Push (2009). InStyle magazine selected it as one of their 100 best dresses of the 2000s, saying the "extravagant" print was "incredibly flattering".

Several looks from Natural Dis-tinction have been photographed for Vogue. Lachlan Bailey photographed Look 13, and Nick Knight, who worked with McQueen often, photographed one of the skeleton-printed suits. Mario Testino photographed an editorial featuring a houndstooth skirt suit in 2009. Pop singer Lady Gaga wore the one-shoulder black mermaid gown from Look 43 for a shoot by Josh Olins. Patrick Demarchelier and Tim Walker photographed Look 10 and Look 2, respectively.

=== Museum ownership and exhibitions ===
A pair of shoes from Natural Dis-tinction appeared in Alexander McQueen: Savage Beauty, a retrospective exhibition of McQueen's designs originally staged at the Metropolitan Museum of Art in 2011. They were placed in the Cabinet of Curiosities section with other accessories. The image from the Natural Dis-tinction invitation, with McQueen's face shifting into a skull, was used for the front cover of the exhibition catalogue.

A copy of Look 8, a floral print dress with leather bodice, owned by the The Museum at FIT appeared in their 2017 exhibition Force of Nature. A copy of Look 26, one of the rainbow kaleidoscope minidresses, appeared in the 2018 exhibition A Queen Within: Adorned Archetypes at the New Orleans Museum of Art.

Three items owned by the Los Angeles County Museum of Art appeared in the museum's exhibition Lee Alexander McQueen: Mind, Mythos, Muse, originally staged in 2022: Looks 20 and 32, digitally printed minidresses, and a pair of shoes. When the National Gallery of Victoria (NGV) in Australia restaged Mind, Mythos, Muse, they added garments from their own collection: Look 12, a beige printed jacket and skirt set; Look 15, a fringed dress; and Look 22, a blue printed jacket and leggings set.

== Bibliography ==
- Bolton, Andrew (2011). Alexander McQueen: Savage Beauty. New York City: Metropolitan Museum of Art. ISBN 978-1-58839-412-5. OCLC 687693871.
  - Frankel, Susannah. Introduction. In Bolton (2011), pp. 17–27.
- Esguerra, Clarissa M.; Hansen, Michaela (2022). Lee Alexander McQueen: Mind, Mythos, Muse. New York City: Delmonico Books. ISBN 978-1-63681-018-8. OCLC 1289986708.
- Fairer, Robert; Wilcox, Claire (2016). Alexander McQueen: Unseen. New Haven, Connecticut: Yale University Press. ISBN 978-0-300-22267-8. OCLC 946216643.
- Fox, Chloe (2012). Vogue On: Alexander McQueen. Vogue on Designers. London: Quadrille Publishing. ISBN 978-1849491136. OCLC 828766756.
- Gleason, Katherine (2012). Alexander McQueen: Evolution. New York City: Race Point Publishing. ISBN 978-1-61058-837-9. OCLC 783147416.
- Homer, Karen (2023). Little Book of Alexander McQueen: The Story of the Iconic Brand. London: Welbeck Publishing Group. ISBN 978-1-80279-270-6.
- Honigman, Ana Finel (2021). What Alexander McQueen Can Teach You About Fashion. London: Frances Lincoln. ISBN 978-0-7112-5906-5.
- Knox, Kristin (2010). Alexander McQueen: Genius of a Generation. London: A&C Black. ISBN 978-1-4081-3223-4. OCLC 794296806.
- Mora, Juliana Luna; Berry, Jess (2 September 2022). "Creative Direction Succession in Luxury Fashion: The Illusion of Immortality at Chanel and Alexander McQueen". Luxury. 9 (2–3): 117–140. doi:10.1080/20511817.2022.2194039. ISSN 2051-1817.
- Thomas, Dana (2015). Gods and Kings: The Rise and Fall of Alexander McQueen and John Galliano. New York City: Penguin Publishing. ISBN 978-1-101-61795-3. OCLC 951153602.
- Villanueva Romero, Diana (December 2013). ""Savage Beauty": representations of women as animals in PETA's campaigns and Alexander McQueen's fashion shows". Feminismo/s (22): 147–175. doi:10.14198/fem.2013.22.09. hdl:10045/39796. ISSN 1696-8166. Archived from the original on 12 April 2023.
- Watt, Judith (2012). Alexander McQueen: The Life and the Legacy. New York City: Harper Design. ISBN 978-1-84796-085-6. OCLC 892706946.
- Wilcox, Claire, ed. (2015). Alexander McQueen. New York City: Abrams Books. ISBN 978-1-4197-1723-9. OCLC 891618596.
  - Bethune, Kate. "Encyclopedia of Collections". In Wilcox (2015), pp. 303–326.
  - Fury, Alex. "Show, and Tell". In Wilcox (2015), pp. 220–233.
  - O'Neill, Alistair. "The Shining and Chic". In Wilcox (2015), pp. 261–280.
  - Skogh, Lisa. "Museum of the Mind". In Wilcox (2015), pp. 178–188.
  - Townsend, Eleanor. "Memento Mori". In Wilcox (2015), pp. 159–163.
  - Wilcox, Claire. "Plato's Atlantis: Anatomy of a Collection". In Wilcox (2015), pp. 83–103.
- Wilson, Andrew (2015). Alexander McQueen: Blood Beneath the Skin. New York City: Simon and Schuster. ISBN 978-1-4767-7674-3. OCLC 1310585849.
