= The Horn of Plenty =

2009 fashion collection by Alexander McQueen

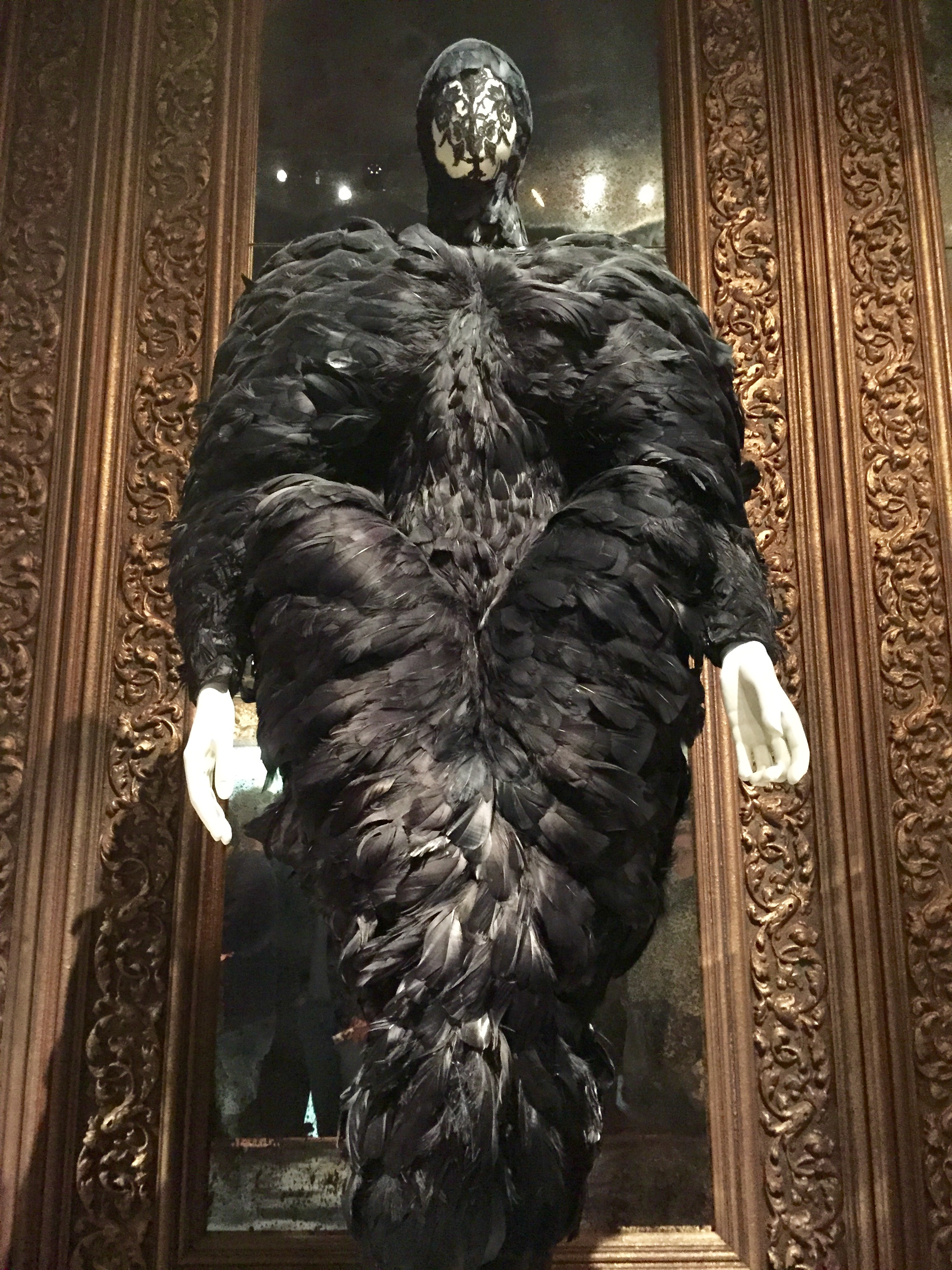
Look 45, the final dress from the collection, at Alexander McQueen: Savage Beauty, Victoria and Albert Museum, 2015

The Horn of Plenty: Everything But the Kitchen Sink is the thirty-fourth collection by British fashion designer Alexander McQueen, released for the Autumn/Winter 2009 season of his eponymous fashion house. The collection combined the aesthetics of classic haute couture fashion with household rubbish to satirise the fashion industry for its wastefulness and lack of originality. The Horn of Plenty also featured reimagined designs and reworked items from McQueen's previous collections, serving as a retrospective of his own design history. Common design flourishes included houndstooth patterns, design elements overdone to ironic proportions, and prints based on the natural world. Production was shadowed by photographer Nick Waplington, who in 2013 published a photo book documenting the collection's creation.

Forty-five looks were presented at the collection's runway show, which was staged on 10 March 2009 at the Palais Omnisports de Paris-Bercy in Paris. The centrepiece of the set was a large pile of props from previous McQueen shows, painted black. The models were styled with exaggerated lipstick, headpieces made from everyday refuse like aluminium cans, and extreme platform heels based on historical styles. On the runway, they struck poses that called back to the stylised body language in silent films and mid-century fashion photography.

Contemporary critical response was mixed; some felt the styling of the collection was misogynistic, while others appreciated the showmanship and references to fashion history. The Horn of Plenty is better regarded by retrospective reviewers, and it is often cited as one of McQueen's most memorable collections. Academic analysis has focused on the underlying commentary and themes, particularly the ideas evoked by the pair of fully feathered dresses that closed the collection. Ensembles from The Horn of Plenty are held by various museums and have appeared in exhibitions such as the McQueen retrospective Alexander McQueen: Savage Beauty.

== Background ==
British fashion designer Alexander McQueen was known for his imaginative, sometimes controversial, designs and dramatic fashion shows. Over the course of his career, which lasted from 1992 until his death in 2010, he explored a broad range of ideas and themes, particularly sexuality, death, violence, romanticism, and historicism. He began as an apprentice on Savile Row, earning a reputation as an expert tailor, then launched his eponymous fashion house shortly after graduating with his master's degree in fashion design in 1992. From October 1996 to October 2001, McQueen was – in addition to his responsibilities for his own label – head designer at French fashion house Givenchy, replacing John Galliano. McQueen and Galliano's careers overlapped, and they were frequently compared in the press because of their theatrical styles. McQueen, who had a competitive streak, resented the comparison and sought to outdo Galliano's ideas in his own work. His creative differences with Givenchy's management resulted in tension. In December 2000, McQueen sold 51 per cent of his company to Italian fashion house Gucci – a Givenchy competitor – retaining creative control.

McQueen described the fashion industry as toxic and suffocating, and was often ambivalent about continuing his work. The extreme styling in his first collections resulted in media accusations of misogyny; despite his objections, the label persisted through much of his career. By the mid-to-late 2000s, he had reached a point of exhaustion, at one point saying, "I go in, I do my business, do the parties, and leave." He told a friend he regretted signing his contract with Gucci, but feared putting his employees out of work if he stepped down from his brand.

As early as 1997, McQueen began creating collections that served as critiques of the industry. The runway shows for mid-career collections like Voss (Spring/Summer 2001) and What A Merry-Go-Round (Autumn/Winter 2001) used imagery associated with insane asylums and circuses to portray the fashion industry as chaotic and deranged. The program notes for Natural Dis-tinction Un-natural Selection (Spring/Summer 2009) explained that McQueen was concerned about human impact on the environment. By the time he staged The Horn of Plenty, McQueen was more disillusioned with fashion than ever, particularly in light of the 2007–2008 financial crisis that had devastated the global economy. He was critical of the way the rapid turnover of the fashion cycle relied on consumerism and over-consumption to turn a profit, creating unnecessary waste and exhausting designers.

Birds, wings, and feathers were a recurring theme in McQueen's work. His fifth collection, The Birds (Spring/Summer 1995), was inspired by ornithology, the study of birds, and named for the 1963 Alfred Hitchcock film The Birds. Several garments from this collection were printed with silhouettes of swallows in flight. The stage of his thirty-first collection, La Dame Bleue (Spring/Summer 2008), was illuminated by giant blue neon wings. Other collections with heavy avian elements included Voss, Irere (Spring/Summer 2003), and The Widows of Culloden (Autumn/Winter 2006).

== Concept and collection ==
=== Inspiration ===
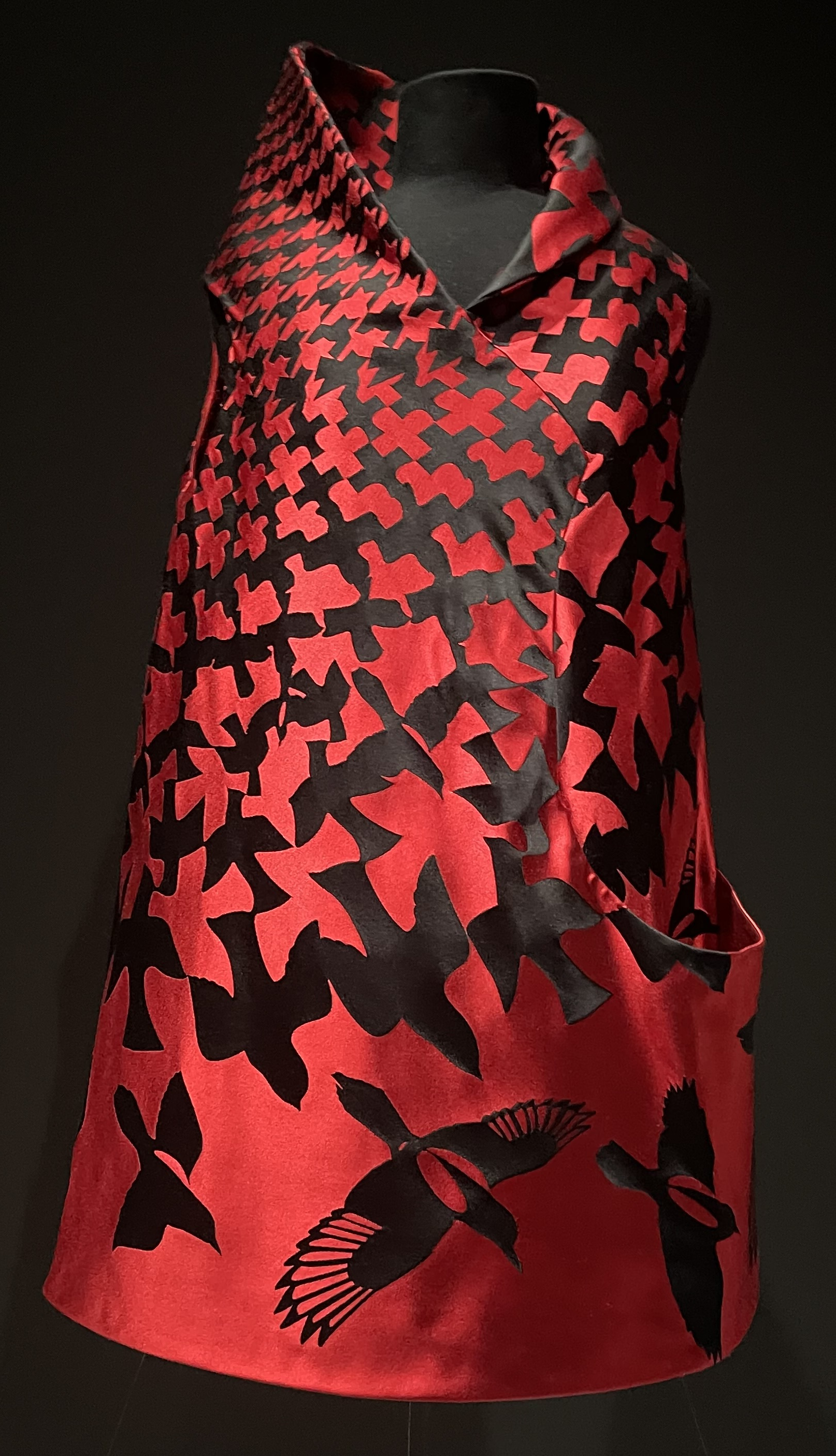
Look 29, featuring a reworked print from The Birds (Spring/Summer 1995)

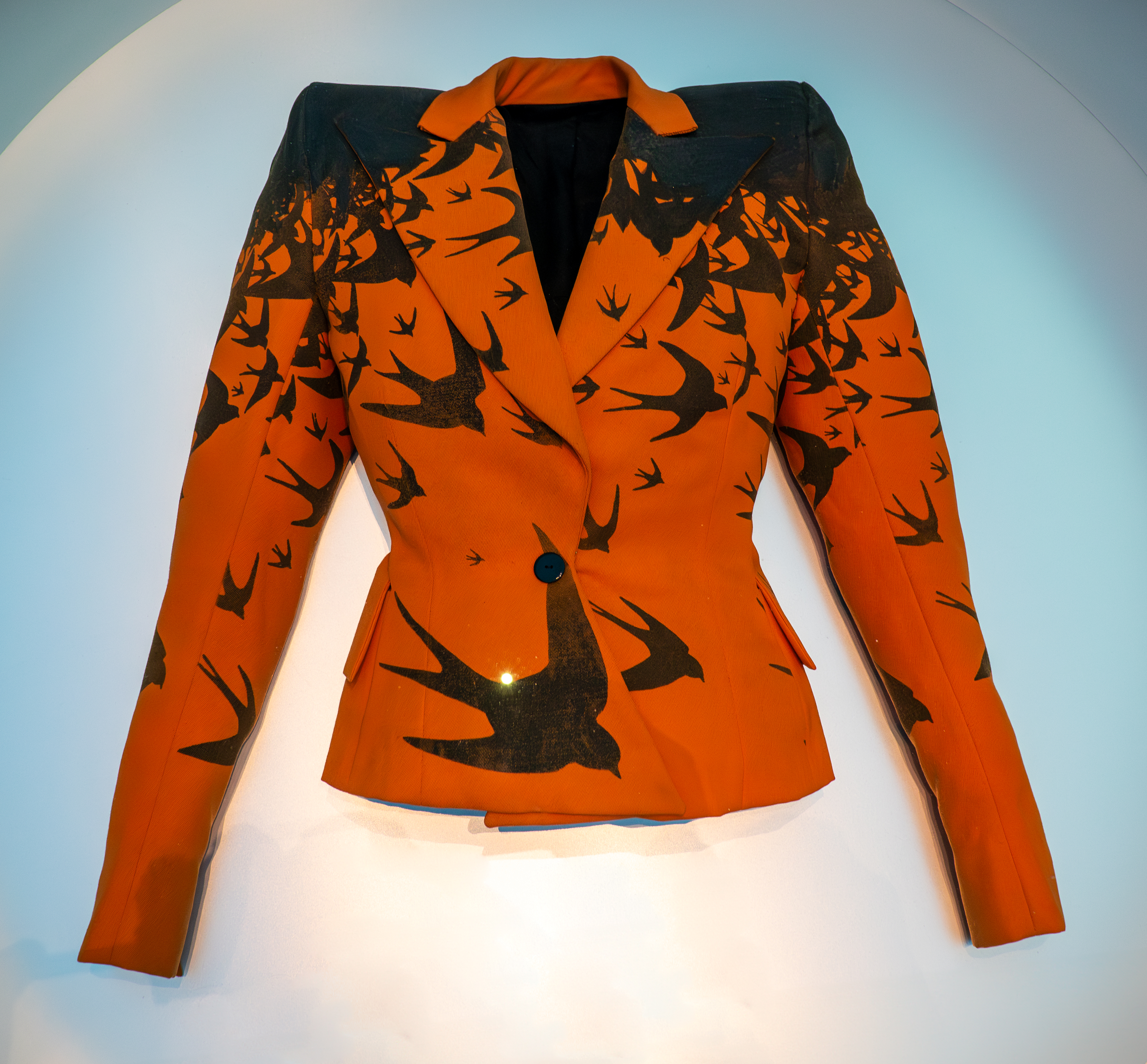
Jacket with swallow print from Look 33 of The Birds, as presented at Sleeping Beauties: Reawakening Fashion at the Metropolitan Museum of Art, 2024

The Horn of Plenty: Everything But the Kitchen Sink (Autumn/Winter 2009), generally referred to as The Horn of Plenty, is the thirty-fourth collection McQueen made for his eponymous fashion house. It was conceived as a dark satire of the fashion industry with pastiches of notable designers and McQueen's past works. He felt the industry was reliant on reusing old ideas rather than coming up with new concepts, and would be even more risk-averse during a recession. McQueen felt sales would be poor regardless as a result of the declining economy, so he intended to attract attention by rejecting the safe approach and making a statement. He jokingly described the collection to journalist Susannah Frankel as "a sackable offense".

McQueen's concerns about wastefulness and consumerism were expressed in designs that appeared to be made of rubbish, such as coats that looked like bin bags or bubble wrap. These items, reflecting the ironic sensibility of the collection, were actually made from expensive specialist materials such as paper nylon and lacquered silk. Visual inspiration for the rubbish-as-couture aesthetic was a 2007 portrait by Hendrik Kerstens. It features the artist's daughter wearing a white plastic bag as a wimple, referencing the work of 17th century painter Johannes Vermeer. The inclusion of designs resembling rubbish may also have been referencing the so-called "hobo couture" collection by John Galliano for Dior. Presented in Spring/Summer 2000, Galliano's collection featured clothing made from rubbish like old newspapers and models styled to look homeless, resulting in significant controversy.

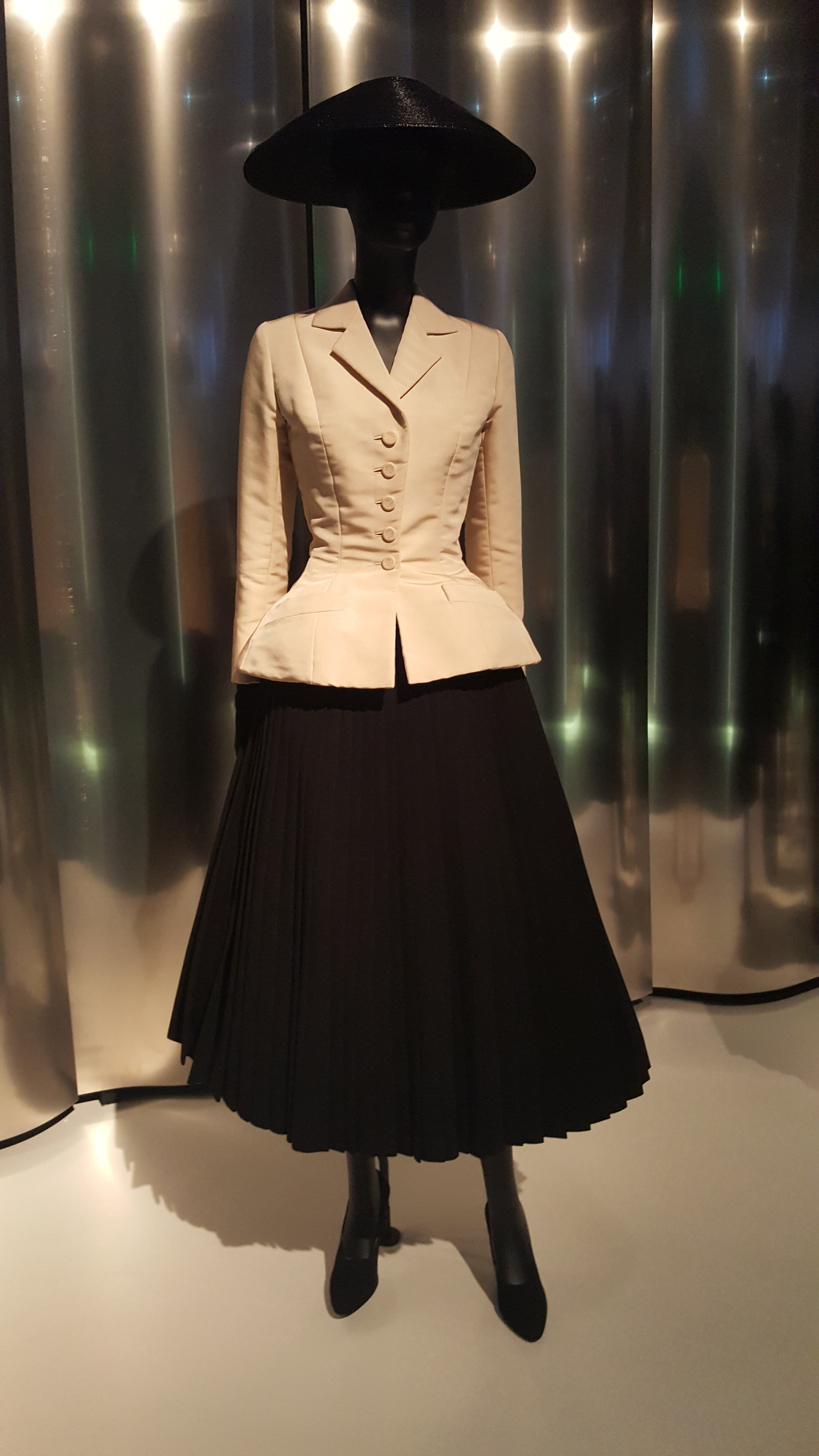
New Look "Bar Suit" by Christian Dior, 1947

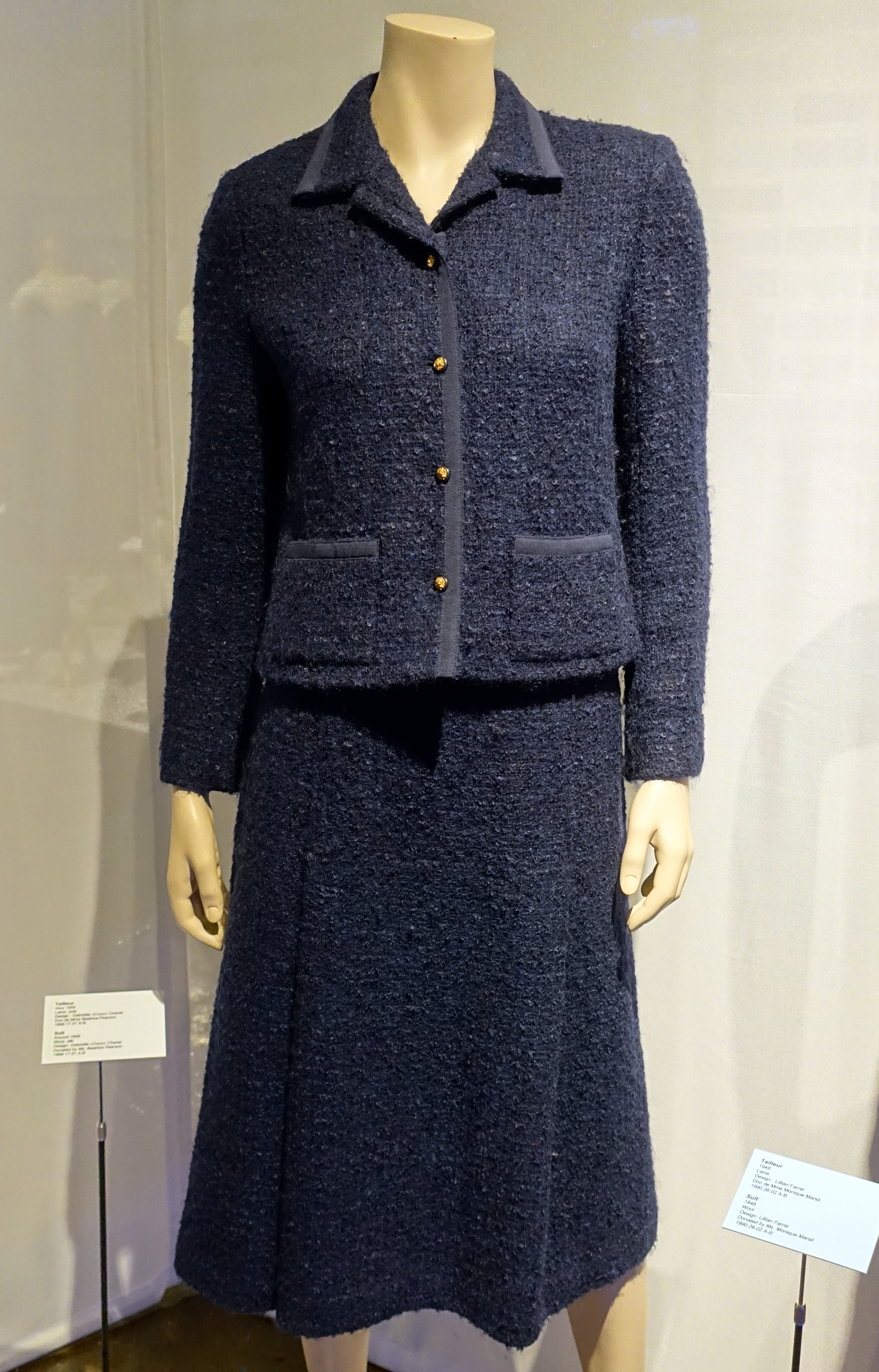
Blue tweed suit by Coco Chanel, 1955

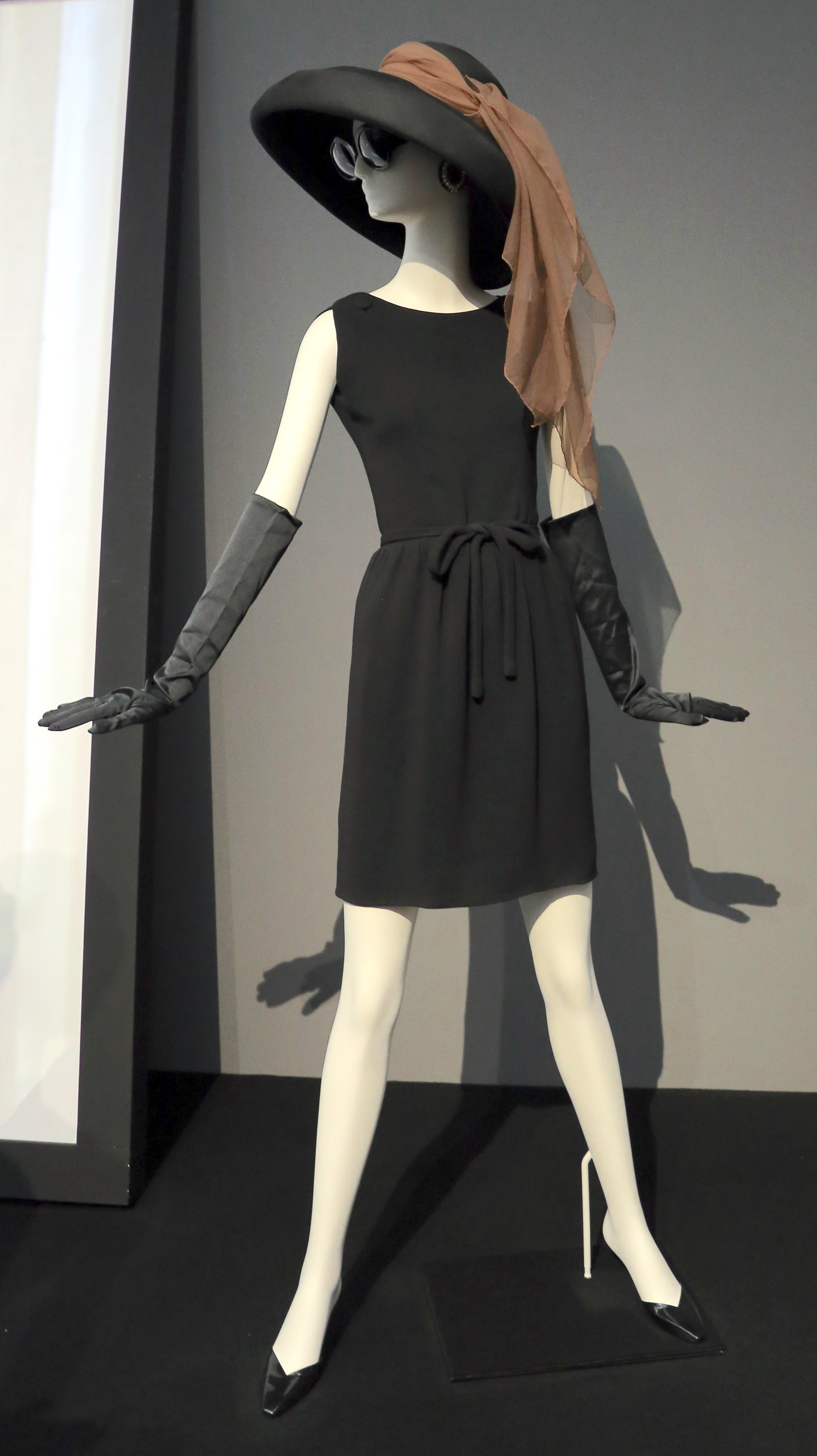
Little black dress by Hubert de Givenchy, 1961

Inspiration from other designers was wide-ranging. McQueen drew extensively on the fashion of the 1950s for the collection, particularly the hourglass silhouette popular at the time. He made visual allusions to the New Look created by designer Christian Dior, the tweed suits that Coco Chanel was known for, and the little black dress popularised by Hubert de Givenchy. There were possible references to later designers as well: the wrap dresses of Yves Saint Laurent, the unusual silhouettes of Cristóbal Balenciaga, a knitted dress with embellishments that suggested the medusa logo of Versace, and a 1990s dress from Comme des Garçons.

McQueen, 39 years old when the collection was conceived, viewed The Horn of Plenty as the last he would make as a young man, and sought to create a retrospective of his career to that point. Accordingly, many details, including the set decoration and soundtrack, referred back to previous collections. The title was taken from the name of a pub associated with the final victim of Jack the Ripper, calling back to McQueen's thesis collection, Jack the Ripper Stalks His Victims (1992). Many designs were revisions of earlier ideas, while other items, like a chainmail yashmak, were archival pieces taken from previous collections, often heavily restructured. Archival bottoms were reworked into tops, trousers into sleeves, and dresses into coats. A hat from one of McQueen's Givenchy shows was reconstructed in reverse.

A cinemaphile, McQueen was known for drawing on his favourite films for inspiration. He told Women's Wear Daily he was referencing the documentary films Paris Is Burning (1990) and The Cockettes (2002), which concern ball culture and avant-garde theatre, respectively.

=== Collection ===
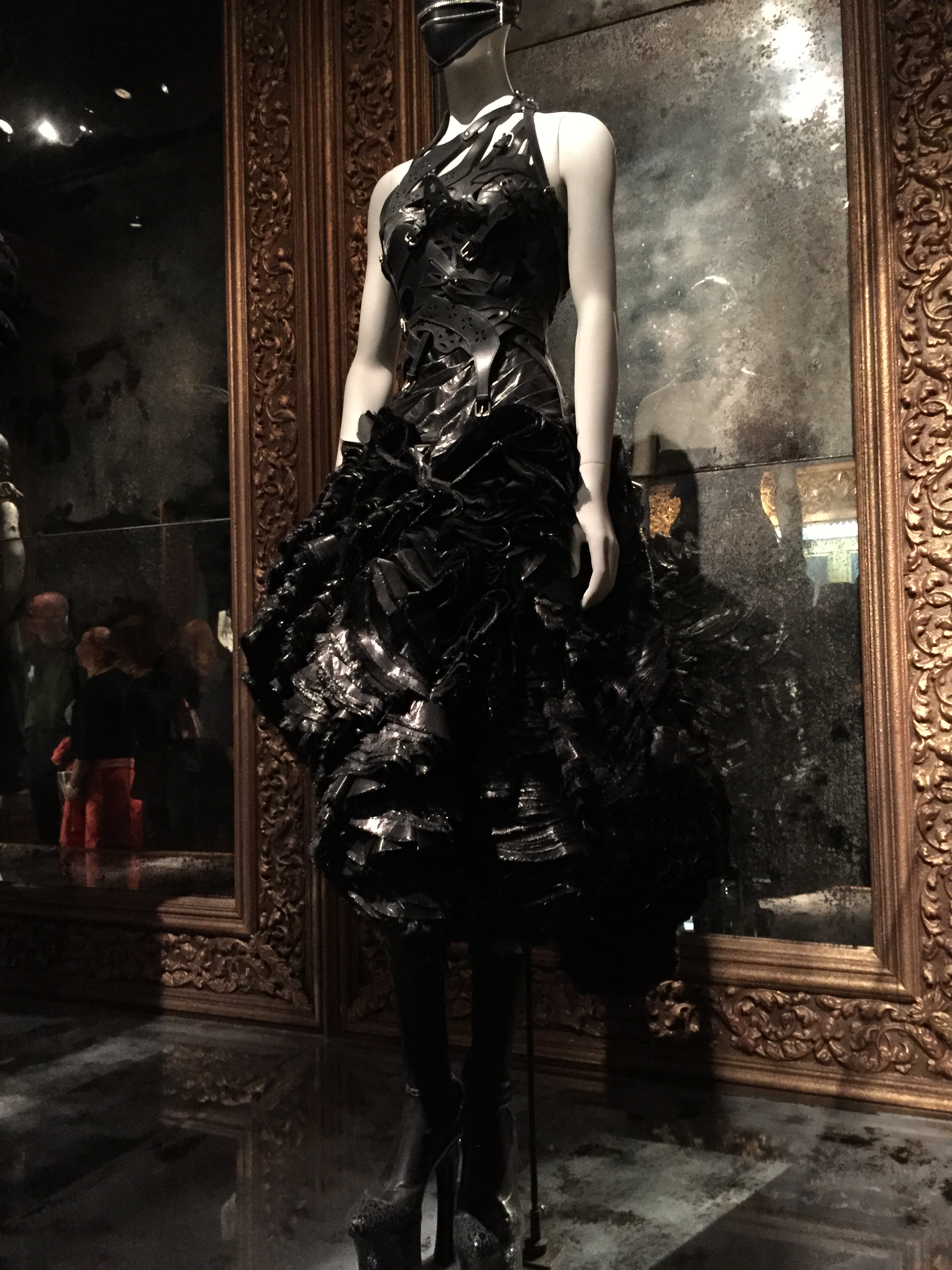
Look 17 at Savage Beauty, 2015

The palette was mainly black and white, with strong accents of bright red and orange. Primary silhouettes included McQueen staples like tailored coats, slim waists, and large shoulders, as well as boxy jackets, a shape he rarely used; conversely, he avoided his usual corset-based designs. Design elements like bustles and ruffles were overdone to the point of parody. The collection prominently featured patterns, including harlequin diamonds, houndstooth, and Prince of Wales check. The harlequin diamonds called back to the circus theme of What a Merry-Go-Round. The use of houndstooth, a reference to Dior's New Look, was especially exaggerated – some ensembles had multiple items in different sizes of the pattern. Look 6 had a fur coat rendered in a large houndstooth.

The collection heavily referenced the natural world with animal prints and real furs. The use of red and orange against black was a reference to animals with warning colours. There was a strong emphasis on avian elements, including feather prints, a birdcage hat, and garments made in whole or in part from feathers. A print of swallows that had appeared on several garments from The Birds was reworked for The Horn of Plenty. The new version featured a houndstooth pattern that, through tessellation, transformed into magpies, referencing the mathematically inspired art of Dutch graphic artist M. C. Escher just as the original collection had.

Accessories were made from repurposed everyday items, or were made to look like them. Miliner Philip Treacy made hats from lampshades and umbrellas, among other things. Hairstylist Guido Palau made headpieces from aluminium cans sprayed black and wrapped in plastic. (Note: Some sources incorrectly report that the aluminium can headpieces were made by Treacy. Both backstage photographer Robert Fairer and makeup artist Peter Philips have stated that they were made by Palau.) McQueen had experimented with extreme footwear for previous collections. Three seasons prior, his collection La Dame Bleue had included high platform shoes inspired by the Japanese geta and the Venetian chopine of the 15th century. He brought these ideas into The Horn of Plenty, which featured platform boots in houndstooth and red geta-style heels with a thin strap like a Mary Jane shoe. Georgina Goodman was responsible for shoe design for The Horn of Plenty.

== Production and photo book ==
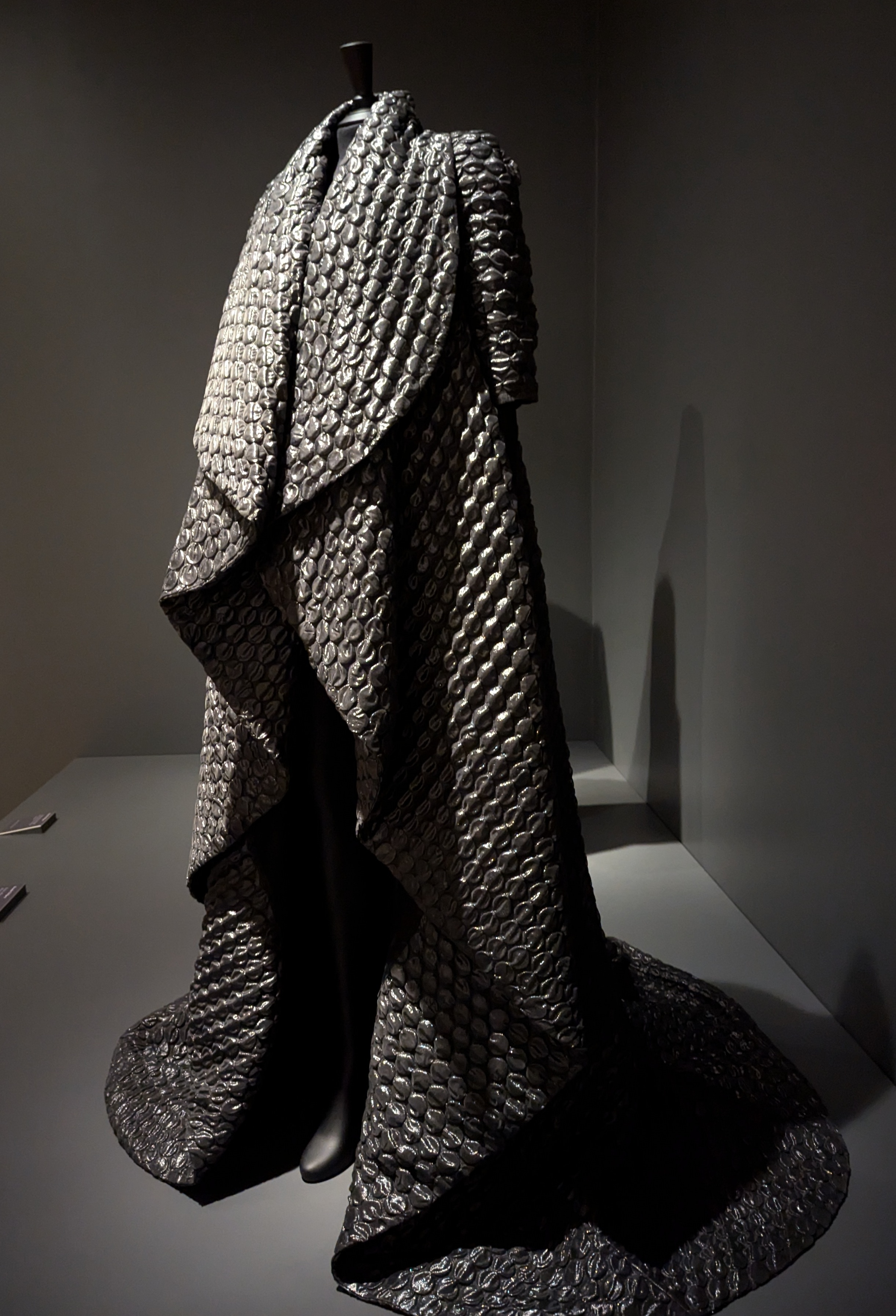
Bubble wrap jacket from Look 43, presented at Lee Alexander McQueen & Ann Ray - Rendez-Vous (2024)

In 2008, McQueen asked his friend Nick Waplington, a photographer, if he would be interested in collaborating on a photo book documenting the creation of The Horn of Plenty from beginning to end. Although he was interested, Waplington was living and working in Jerusalem and wanted to put off McQueen's project for several years while he finished his work there. (Note: Waplington says McQueen recruited him in 2007, but he was not living in Jerusalem until 2008. 2007 would also have been well before The Horn of Plenty was created.) McQueen insisted that it had to be that collection at that time. Waplington realised that McQueen saw the collection as a unique turning point for his career, and agreed to take on the project. McQueen also asked his journalist friend Susannah Frankel to participate. McQueen was generally private to the point of deliberate obtuseness; both Frankel and Waplington considered the project an opportunity to glean an unusual amount of insight into his mind and creative process.

Work on the collection took approximately six months, during which Waplington shadowed McQueen and his team closely. The majority of production was concentrated into the final five weeks, beginning in February 2009 with preliminary work at McQueen's London workshop, a final week of polishing in Paris, and ending with the runway show there. McQueen was an unusually hands-on designer. Rather than direct the process from above, he personally cut, pinned, and often sewed parts of the pattern for each runway piece. The majority of the production team had worked with McQueen for years. Frankel described them as working on The Horn of Plenty with a degree of commitment she considered "unprecedented"; they were exhausted by the time they reached Paris.

Waplington took approximately 700 to 800 photographs during his time with McQueen, deliberately staying in the background so as to not interfere. Once the show had concluded, McQueen and Waplington selected about 300 photographs that McQueen arranged for the final book. During the editing process, the pair added photos of landfills and recycling plants, juxtaposed with those of the collection to reinforce McQueen's point about environmental destruction. Although the book was completed by late 2009, minor issues with the publisher delayed their signing a contract until after the Christmas holidays that year, and in February 2010, McQueen committed suicide. In the immediate aftermath, Waplington received a number of offers to publish the book, but the Alexander McQueen brand asked Waplington to wait; he agreed, not wanting to go ahead without their approval. The book was published in 2013 as Alexander McQueen: Working Process. The Tate Britain held an exhibition of the photographs in 2015.

== Runway show ==
=== Production details ===
Close-up of Karlie Kloss wearing Look 39 on the runway, with overdrawn dark lips and drink can headpiece

The runway show was staged on 10 March 2009 at the Palais Omnisports de Paris-Bercy in Paris during Paris Fashion Week. The show was dedicated to McQueen's mother. The invitation featured the photograph which had inspired the collection, a portrait of a woman wearing a white plastic bag as a wimple.

McQueen worked with a consistent creative team for his shows. Overall styling was handled by Camilla Nickerson, while Gainsbury & Whiting oversaw production. Joseph Bennett returned for set design. Hair was styled by Guido Palau, make-up by Peter Philips.

The runway was made of cracked, mirror-like black glass, which author Dana Thomas took as "a swipe at fashion's self-obsession", and curator Kate Bethune thought was an allusion to the shattered economy. The centrepiece of the set was a large pile of props from McQueen's past shows, all painted black. There were horses from the carousel in What a Merry-Go-Round, the chandelier from Sarabande (Spring/Summer 2007), and a branch from the tree at the centre of The Girl Who Lived in the Tree (Autumn/Winter 2008). There was also, in a nod to the collection's subtitle, a kitchen sink.

The soundtrack consisted of samples and remixes from the soundtracks of McQueen's previous shows, as well as the Marilyn Manson song "The Beautiful People" (1996). "Witch Doktor" (1994) by Armand van Helden was featured in No. 13 (Spring/Summer 1998). "Dooms Night" (1999) by Azzido Da Bass appeared in Voss (Spring/Summer 2001). "Dance, Dance, Dance" (1977) by Chic appeared in Deliverance (Spring/Summer 2004).

=== Styling ===
Models were styled with stark white face makeup, bleached eyebrows, and exaggerated, overdrawn lips in red or black; the colours used mirrored those used for the garments. McQueen originally asked for a look that emphasized the eyes, but Philips created a lip-centric look, drawing on McQueen's ideas as well as his own. The white face came from the makeup of the Elizabethan era, while the dark overdrawn lips were taken from clown makeup and actress Joan Crawford. There was also an influence from the absurdist Terry Gilliam film Brazil (1985). Some reviewers have identified the makeup style as a reference to avant-garde performance artist Leigh Bowery, whom McQueen knew and admired. Others took it as a jab at the kind of extreme distortions in appearance that can be created by cosmetic procedures like filler injections or plastic surgery. Still others suggested a resemblance to the exaggerated features of sex dolls.

McQueen additionally wanted to draw on "Eliza Doolittle at the flower market before she transforms in [the 1964 film] My Fair Lady". Palau's hairstyling wound up accounting for this. He concealed the models' hair within head wraps, then added arrangements of aluminium cans wrapped in plastic, creating what Philips called a "dirty, early morning flower market" look. Hairstyling and hats were unique to each model and look.

The poses and gestures the models made while walking called back to the stylised body language in silent films and mid-century fashion photography. Some models found it difficult to walk in the extremely high heels that accompanied most outfits. Polina Kasina told fashion theorist Caroline Evans, with some amusement, that they were "easy to walk in", but frightening nonetheless, because "you never know" what might happen on the runway. Kate Bethune perceived a strong Gothic influence to the runway show, with styling that "teetered on the precipice between the grotesque and the farcical".

=== Catwalk presentation ===
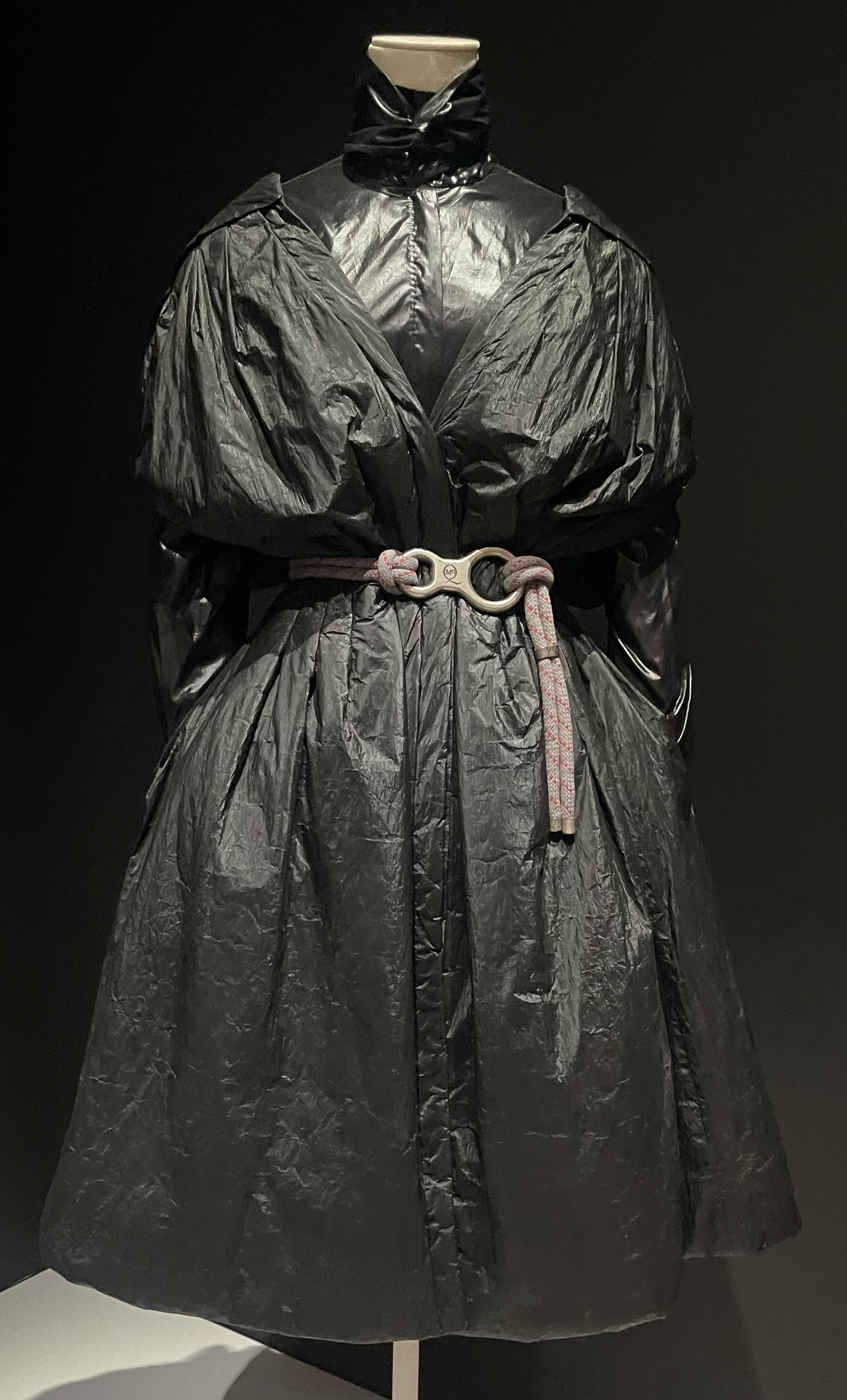
Coatdress from Look 15 paired with 2007 belt from diffusion line McQ; at Lee Alexander McQueen: Mind, Mythos, Muse at Musée national des beaux-arts du Québec

Forty-five looks were presented across roughly three phases. The first fourteen looks were primarily based around houndstooth and check patterns in black and white. For Look 5, model Amanda Laine wore a houndstooth "New Look" dress. It was accessorised with a coiled metal collar originally used in It's a Jungle Out There, styled similarly to the neck rings traditionally worn by the Southern Ndebele people of Africa. The hem of her dress is coated in a black material that appears like tar, and on close inspection, actually depicts a silhouette of a scene. Look 8 features the same style of pheasant claw earrings that Leane had developed for Look 14 of Dante (Autumn/Winter 1996).

Looks 15 to 38 mostly comprised ensembles in black, with some red-based outfits as well. Look 33 comprises a hat and coat of black fur, worn with a black leather belt. According to Jonathan Faiers, the ensemble is dyed goat fur, although it is often said to be monkey fur. He identifies its origins in the experimental monkey fur garments designed by Elsa Schiaparelli in the 1930s, as well as in a coat made of human hair from McQueen's Eshu (Spring/Summer 2000). For Faiers, it "represents McQueen's ability to combine the natural world [...] with references to fashion history itself".

The final seven ensembles were all showpiece dresses. Looks 39 through 42 had patterns with a base of red. Faiers identified Look 40, a red and black feathered dress, as a reference to a pheasant-feather dress from The Widows of Culloden. Look 42 featured a reworked version of a chainmail yashmak by Leane originally made for Eye (Spring/Summer 2000), worn underneath a silk gown with a milk snake print in red, black, and white. Look 43 was a one-shoulder black mermaid gown in nylon made to look like a bin bag, styled with a floor-length shawl made to appear like black bubble wrap.

The final two looks were a pair of knee-length dresses covered in duck feathers; these were inspired by the White Swan and Black Swan characters from the Matthew Bourne interpretation of Swan Lake, respectively. Look 44, in white, alluded to the demure White Swan with an exaggerated collar which surrounds the model's upper body, extending well above the top of the head. The final showpiece, in black, referenced the more aggressive Black Swan character. The dress has a small waist and large shoulders; this is primarily an exaggeration of the typical 1950s silhouette, but also resembles the puffy leg-of-mutton sleeves common in the 1890s.

Like Voss and Pantheon ad Lucem (Autumn/Winter 2004), the show closed with the sound of a flatlining heart monitor. After taking his bows to a rowdy standing ovation, McQueen departed immediately for his hotel room rather than meet with guests backstage, as is customary in the fashion industry. He had been avoiding these after-show meetings for several years by this point.

== Reception ==
=== Designs and show ===
I think it's dangerous to play it safe because you will just get lost in the midst of cashmere twinsets. People don't want to see clothes—they want to see something that fuels the imagination.

— Alexander McQueen in The New York Times, 11 March 2009

Reception to The Horn of Plenty was divided. Some critics found the rubbish aesthetic, extreme heels, and exaggerated makeup misogynistic, while others appreciated the showmanship and references to classic haute couture. Audience reactions were varied, despite the standing ovation. Sarah Mower from Vogue described acrimonious arguments breaking out after the show. In The New York Times, Eric Wilson quoted an unnamed magazine editor dismissing it as "a collection inspired by Wall-E" – a 2008 film that depicts Earth as a rubbish-strewn wasteland – but also described one industry professional as "visibly ecstatic". Buyers from high-end retail stores like Bergdorf Goodman and Holt Renfrew were enthusiastic about the commercial potential of the collection's unconventional designs.

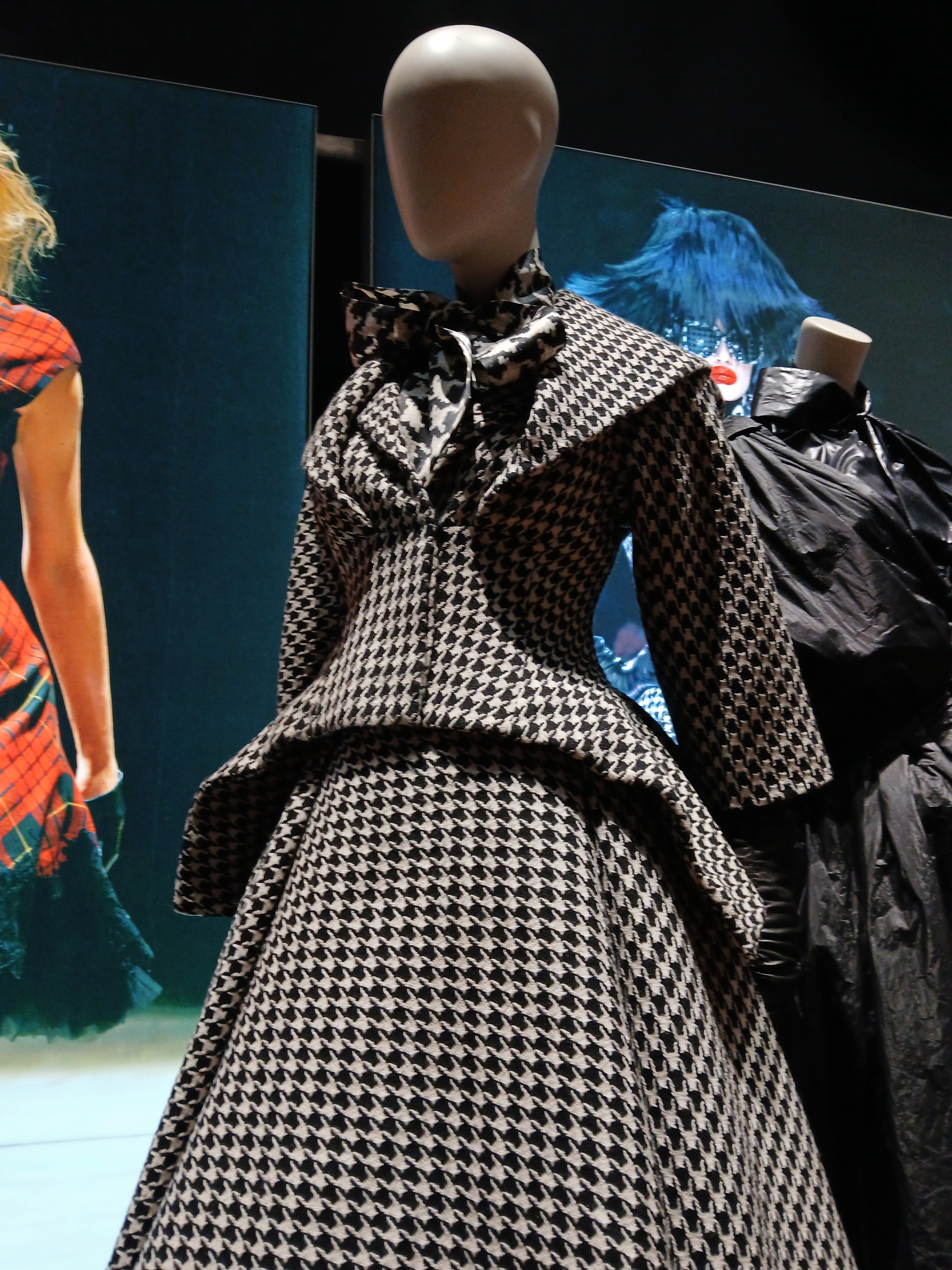
Houndstooth suit with bow of contrasting pattern size at the exhibit accompanying the House of McQueen play, 2025

A number of reviewers regarded The Horn of Plenty as an overall success. Miles Socha at Women's Wear Daily called it a "full-strength, hard-core McQueen experience". Another reviewer there felt it was a daring expression of rage. Hilary Alexander, the fashion editor for The Independent, was enthused about the entire show, especially the variety of materials and attention to detail. Writing for the Los Angeles Times, Booth Moore was intrigued by McQueen being in "high-camp mode". Although broadly positive in their reviews, Suzy Menkes of the International Herald Tribune and Liz Jones of the Daily Mail had reservations about the collection.

Many described it as the best or most interesting collection presented at Paris Fashion Week that season. Mower called McQueen "the last designer standing who is brave or foolhardy enough" to present a collection so polarising. The inclusion of McQueen's edgy brand signatures reminded critics of his influence on the industry. Laura Craik, the fashion editor for The Evening Standard, felt he was reclaiming these styles from other designers who had presented less powerful versions over the years. Socha had similar thoughts, writing "If other designers have recently homed in on McQueen's signature brand of power dressing, he laid down a gauntlet with his nuclear-powered dressing."

Reviewers varied on what they liked best. Jones thought the collection an opportune reminder of fashion's ability to be provocative and novel. The extravagant prints were a high point for several reviewers, especially the varying sizes of houndstooth. Writing for the Financial Times, Vanessa Friedman was pleased with the animality of the prints and the attention-grabbing designs. Craik identified Treacy's hats and the eveningwear as her favourite parts, while Menkes appreciated the novelty of the oversized knitted items. The reviewer in Le Monde appreciated the juxtaposition of elegant or "bourgeois" aesthetics with discordant elements like chainmail, leather, and the rubbish-styled items. Jenny Barchfield at the Associated Press highlighted the way McQueen had exaggerated staple silhouettes "beyond the boundaries of politeness".

Most critics responded well to the showpiece designs. Craik and Barchfield each highlighted the sculptural feathered dresses, and said that although they looked exciting to wear, deemed them more likely to appear in a museum than a wardrobe. For the Sunday Independent, Andrea Byrne thought the designs would be popular for magazine covers because of the sense of escapism they evoked. Mower respected McQueen's decision not to "compromise on construction and craftsmanship" for the showpieces, despite his frustration with the industry. Menkes and Jones were more reticent, describing the showpieces as closer to costume than wearable fashion, and questioning the collection's appeal for the average person. The Irish Times's fashion editor Deirdre McQuillan agreed, feeling that it "became a macabre display of grotesque couture", albeit a well-crafted one.

=== Theme and styling ===
As a satire and a criticism of fashion, the collection was more divisive. Several reviewers noted that the collection lacked the sense of romanticism which often balanced McQueen's aggressive side. Barchfield was enthusiastic about the way McQueen played with concepts of beauty and ugliness. At the Toronto Star, David Graham felt the show was a disturbing indictment of the industry's excesses, particularly in a time of economic crisis. Moore appreciated the irony of McQueen "making fun of his own compulsion for extreme runway drama" while making a grand statement about fashion. Eugenia de la Torriente, writing for El País, noticed this as well, and although she appreciated the drama, she felt it was foolish to attack the decadence of fashion with a collection that was itself quite extravagant. Mower noticed a lack of new ideas, but suspected that was central to McQueen's point about the industry's stagnation. Wilson appreciated the demanding concept, but questioned whether McQueen was being hypocritical by drawing so extensively on fashion history while also dismissing it. In his opinion, the breadth of referencing meant that some elements were overshadowed. Jones questioned McQueen's narrative, asking "what was the message, that fashion is a load of rubbish?"

The extreme runway styling polarised reviewers. Journalists noted that some models had difficulty walking in the restrictive, heavy dresses and high heels. Some described the make-up as clown-like or ridiculous. Whether these elements indicated misogyny was a topic of debate. McQuillan and Menkes thought it did, with Menkes additionally frowning on the overdrawn "porn star lips" as distasteful. Robin Givhan at The Washington Post felt that McQueen had excluded the models from the joke by styling them this way, and had slid from attempting satire to appearing "awfully eager to use his outsize talent to help women make fools of themselves". On the other hand, Alexander thought the styling "represented the potent, passionate and powerful vision of extreme womanhood that is always McQueen's signature". The reviewer in Le Monde felt similarly, writing that the styling helped mark the collection as modern and satirical.

A few critics wondered if McQueen was sending a message to his former employer Givenchy and sometime-rival John Galliano. Menkes thought it was a general retort to Galliano's decision to forgo the runway theatrics he had become famous for. Graham and Wilson both wondered if McQueen had been making what Graham called "a pointed diss" towards Galliano's Spring/Summer 2000 "hobo couture" collection.

=== Retrospective ===
The Horn of Plenty was certainly among Alexander McQueen's most brave and savage visions. If our fruitless obsession with physical appearance seems like dangerous territory for a fashion designer then that was precisely the point.

— Susannah Frankel, Alexander McQueen: Working Process, 2013

Jonathan Akeroyd, chief executive officer of the Alexander McQueen label, told the magazine in April 2009 that the collection had performed well commercially, with showpiece designs accounting for some 35% of total sales.

Retrospective commentary highlights the show's underlying theme. In her foreword to Working Process, Frankel described the collection as "satirical to the point of vicious". Bethune wrote that it was a "powerful comment on the excesses of fashion in a modern consumer age". Alexander McQueen archivist John Matheson described The Horn of Plenty as a "defining collection" for McQueen, because the "wickedness, the romance, and the sense of humour" had come together in balance.

In 2015, Wonderland magazine picked The Horn of Plenty as one of their top seven McQueen shows, calling it "an animalistic obsession reaching its couture peak". The same year, I-D deemed it one of the defining shows of McQueen's career. A 2023 L'Officiel USA article called it one of McQueen's most iconic shows. When Vogue magazine asked various designers about their favourite shows by others, in 2024, Marine Serre picked The Horn of Plenty, calling it a "powerful visual critique of consumerism". She said that McQueen's mix of aesthetics and messaging inspired her own work. Seán McGirr, the creative director of the Alexander McQueen brand since 2024, cited The Horn of Plenty and Plato's Atlantis as having had a strong influence on him in his formative years in fashion.

== Analysis ==
=== Collection as commentary ===
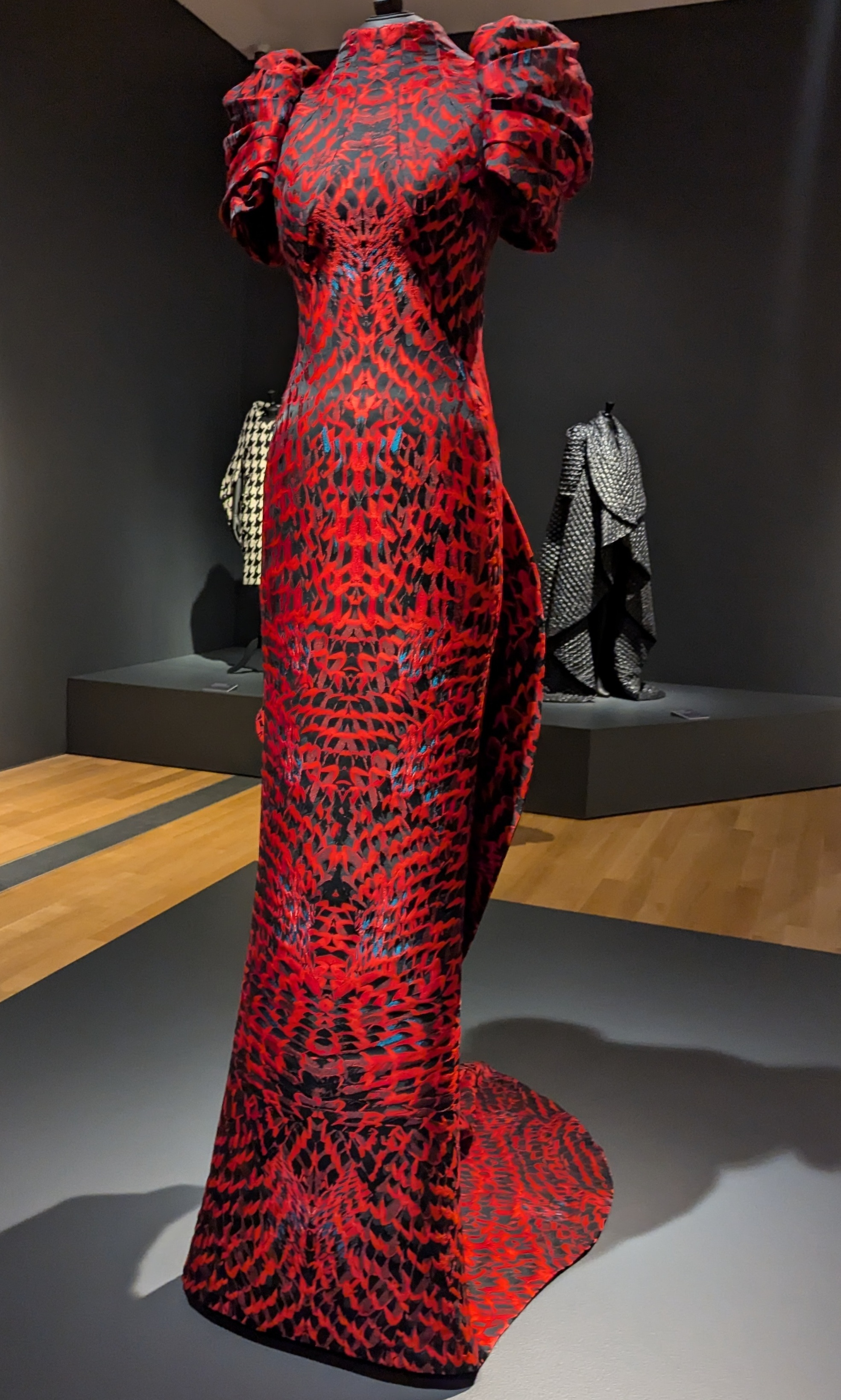
Dress with print resembling feathers, from the retail collection, presented at Rendez-Vous

Academic analysis generally agrees that the show was a successful satire of the fashion industry. Fashion journalist Alex Fury felt the collection exemplified McQueen's tendency to use his shows as cultural commentary. Robert McCaffrey was pleased with the two-pronged satire against fashion's extreme beauty standards and "the disposable and deathly cycle of fashion production". Cultural theologian Robert Covolo described The Horn of Plenty as an example of how McQueen transformed the look of the human body to comment on social issues. In particular, he argued that the near-identical styling and behaviour of the models was an example of "insane repetition", reinforcing McQueen's critique of the fashion cycle as both pointless and environmentally destructive. Waplington considered the environmental satire to be somewhat ironic, pointing out that McQueen had not made a point of restricting himself to renewable materials.

Timothy Campbell contrasted The Horn of Plenty to the work of designer Martin Margiela, who is known for reworking old or unwanted textiles into luxury fashion items as a protest against waste in the fashion industry. He described several elements of The Horn of Plenty as an "inversion" of Margiela's reclamations. Campbell argued that the pile of black-painted props represented McQueen discarding rather than reusing them, and that McQueen's use of luxury fabrics to replicate rubbish was the opposite of Margiela's use of old materials for high-end fashion. Campbell concluded that McQueen's argument was the same as Margiela's, but approached from the other direction; that is, McQueen sought to make a statement about the "unsustainable material waste" produced by the fashion industry, while also demonstrating that it was possible for the industry to contemplate reuse of discarded things.

=== Feathered dresses ===
The duck-feathered finale dresses have attracted commentary about their meaning and symbolism. Jonathan Faiers analysed them as a pair, arguing that they evoked the idea of a flock of birds rather than being an attempt to create a realistic-looking bird. He considered the white dress better than its black counterpart, writing that it "cocoon[ed] and disabl[ed] its wearer", turning her into a living symbol of "hatching and rebirth". Many have noted the resemblance of the black dress to the plumage of a raven; these birds are often depicted in culture as symbols of death. Theorist Mélissa Diaby Savané wrote that the use of raven symbolism was an example how McQueen created garments that he felt were empowering for the wearer, enabling them to "inspire fear in others". Faiers argued that the dress combined multiple visual references from religion, cinema, and fashion history into a "scrambled feathered hybrid".

Alessandro Bucci analysed the black finale dress in an in-depth object study, arguing that it presented a metamorphosis from human to animal that was frozen at the point of being almost complete. On the runway, the model became raven-like, "a sinister ebony creature full of thoughts, of energy and sensuality". He noted that this was not unusual for McQueen, who had presented metamorphic designs in many previous collections. While many critics have defined this tendency as being in the Romantic tradition, Bucci instead identified the The Horn of Plenty as Surrealist in nature, with its "juxtaposition of mutually unrelated objects". For Bucci, the finale dress was a Surrealist version of Dior's New Look, with its parodically exaggerated hourglass silhouette contrasted with its avian features. He interpreted it as McQueen pressing for change: both in the personal sense of helping women become empowered beings with his designs, but also in the general sense of seeking a change in the industry. He concluded his analysis by calling the dress an example of how McQueen blurred the boundaries between fashion and art with his showpiece designs.

=== Other analyses ===
Janice Miller examined the exaggerated makeup from The Horn of Plenty, pointing out the sexual symbolism of the enormous red lips. Psychoanalysts such as Sigmund Freud and Karl Abraham popularised the notion that mouths and female genitals are symbolically related in sexual psychology which, in popular culture, is sometimes taken to mean that red lipstick is meant to evoke the vagina. In The Horn of Plenty, the exaggeration of the lipstick beyond the natural lip line, and the use of unnatural colours, creates what Miller calls "a cavernous orifice that is both fetish object and threat", evoking the folk story of the vagina dentata – a toothed vagina with the power to castrate. For her, it was an example of how McQueen often played on the audience's "fantasies and fears about women and female sexuality".

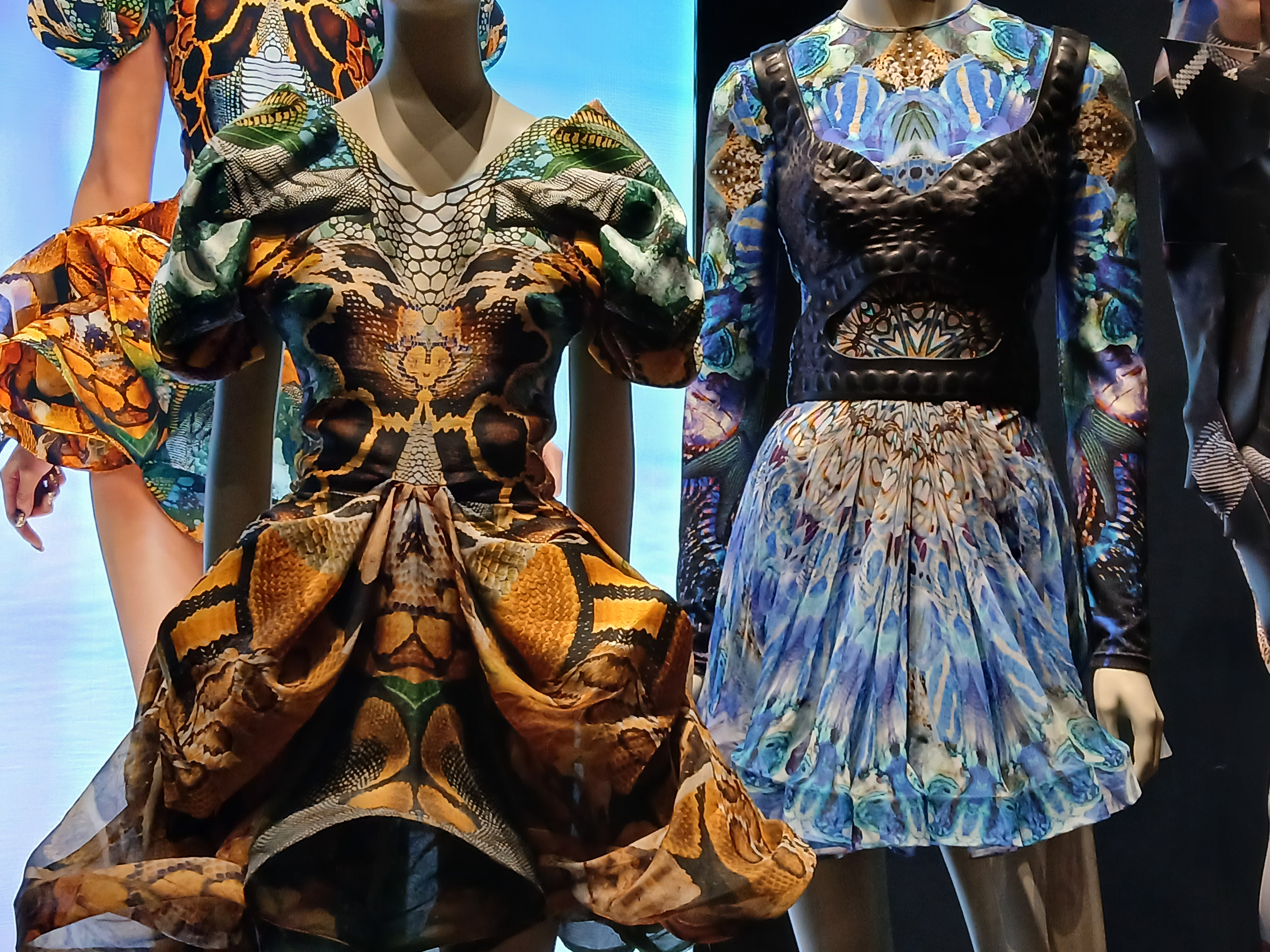
Pair of digital animal-printed dresses from Plato's Atlantis, McQueen's subsequent collection, at House of McQueen companion exhibit

Fashion theorist Jonathan Faiers described The Horn of Plenty as a preparatory step toward Plato's Atlantis (Spring/Summer 2010), McQueen's final complete collection. He likened McQueen to an insect going through metamorphosis or a snake shedding its skin, discarding each previous phase in his creative development in order to "evolve into [his] final form". For The Horn of Plenty, this was particularly pronounced, as McQueen was not only rejecting his own past, but "that of fashion history itself". McQueen distorted traditional silhouettes and design flourishes to an extreme degree, so that "they seem in danger of imminent collapse", representing his view on the industry and the economy as a whole. Faiers identifies the complex digital prints in The Horn of Plenty, based on animals, as a stepping stone to the elaborate animalic prints of Plato's Atlantis, which Faiers viewed as McQueen's creative "apotheosis".

Some authors have commented on McQueen's use of bird motifs. Fashion historian Alistair O'Neill noted that in Greek mythology, women are often transformed into birds to escape trouble, connecting this to McQueen's desire to transform women through clothing to protect and empower them. In folklore, magpies are said to be thieves attracted to shiny things; Faiers thought the use of the magpie may have been a metaphor for fashion's own appropriative vices.

According to Kathryne Fontaine, a pivotal scene in the 2018 novel Mère d'invention by Clara Dupuis-Morency concerns the narrator watching a film about The Horn of Plenty. The narrator, an author, has become creatively stagnant following an abortion one year prior. Watching the film, she has a disturbing revelation in which she begins to connect the derangement and decomposition exemplified in the show with creativity. Although discomfited, she is inspired to incorporate these themes, and her experience of abortion, into her own work, renewing her creativity with an aesthetic of the grotesque.

== Legacy ==
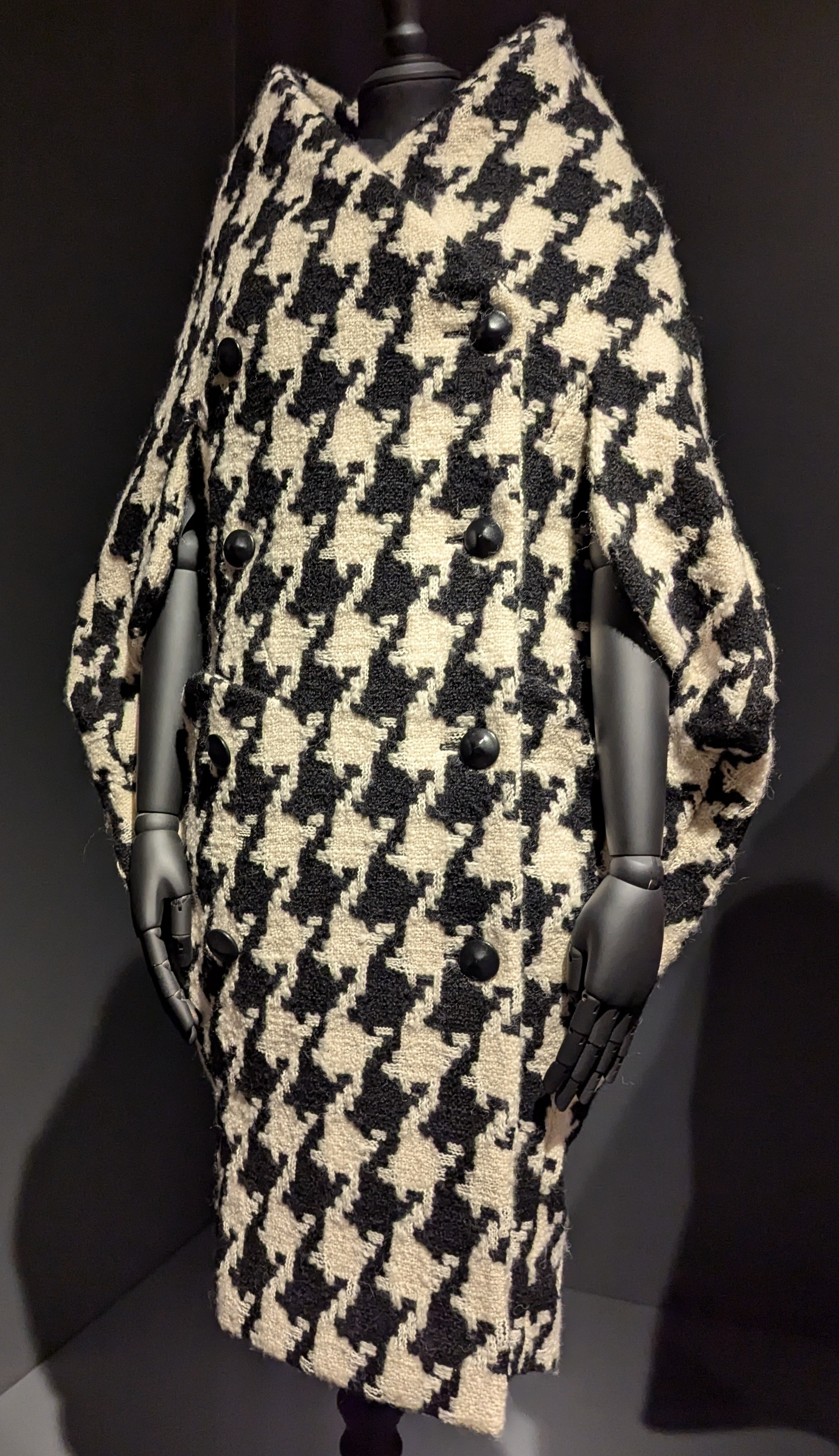
Houndstooth coat from Look 7, at Rendez-Vous (2024)

McQueen brought ideas from Natural Dis-tinction Un-natural Selection and The Horn of Plenty into his next show, Plato's Atlantis (Spring/Summer 2010); all three made use of sophisticated digitally-engineered prints. Plato's Atlantis also continued McQueen's experiments with extreme platform shoes. That collection's showpiece armadillo shoes are almost 12 inches (30 cm) from top to sole, with a 9-inch (23 cm) spike heel.

Several looks from The Horn of Plenty have been photographed for Vogue. Mario Testino photographed an editorial featuring a houndstooth skirt suit in 2009. Pop singer Lady Gaga wore the one-shoulder black mermaid gown from Look 43 for a shoot by Josh Olins. Patrick Demarchelier and Tim Walker photographed Look 10 and Look 2, respectively. In 2012, the Royal Mail released a set of stamps featuring iconic British fashion designs, one of which was the final look from The Horn of Plenty. For her performance at the 68th Annual Grammy Awards in 2026, Lady Gaga wore Look 36, a red and black feathered bolero jacket and sculpted skirt, complete with the exploded basket-like wicker headpiece from the runway.

Several pieces from The Horn of Plenty have been auctioned as part of larger collections. Longtime collaborator Shaun Leane sold several items had had created for McQueen at Sotheby's in New York in 2017. A coiled collar of silver-plated brass, originally worn on the runway for It's a Jungle Out There and reused for The Horn of Plenty, sold for $243,750. (Note: The auction listing for a pair of silver discs originally for Irere (Spring/Summer 2003) claims they were worn on the runway for The Horn of Plenty, but they are not visible in any of the runway photographs from Vogue.) Fashion collector Jennifer Zuiker auctioned her McQueen collection in 2020, including four items from The Horn of Plenty. The prices ranged from $1,875 to $5,625. Fashion dealer Steven Philip auctioned several archival McQueen pieces in 2023, including two from the retail collection of The Horn of Plenty: a houndstooth ensemble and a red and black blouse.

=== Museum ownership and exhibitions ===
Four ensembles from The Horn of Plenty appeared in Alexander McQueen: Savage Beauty, a retrospective exhibition of McQueen's designs shown in 2011 at the Metropolitan Museum of Art (the Met) and in 2015 at the Victoria and Albert Museum (the V&A). Look 17, a black synthetic dress paired with a black leather corset; Look 34, a black leather jacket with fox fur sleeves paired with a black leather skirt; Look 45, the black duck dress; and the basket hat by Philip Treacy for Look 36 appeared in the original staging. Other looks were added for the 2015 staging, including the white duck feather dress.

Two items owned by the Los Angeles County Museum of Art appeared in the museum's exhibition Lee Alexander McQueen: Mind, Mythos, Muse, originally staged in 2022: Look 15, a black dress-and-blouse ensemble made to resemble a bin bag, and a copy of Look 29, the red dress with swallow print. When the National Gallery of Victoria (NGV) in Australia restaged Mind, Mythos, Muse, they added garments from their own collection: a copy of Look 29, a red dress with swallow print and black coordinating boots, and a black and white houndstooth cape from the retail collection.

A 2011 replica of Look 39, owned by the V&A, appeared in the 2012 exhibition British Design 1948–2012: Innovation in the Modern Age at the V&A, juxtaposed with a photograph of McQueen working on the runway original. Three looks appeared in the 2013 exhibition Punk: Chaos to Couture at the Met, as an example of how fashion absorbed ideas, such as making clothing from rubbish, from punk subculture: Looks 15 and 16, faux bin bag dresses, and Look 43, the faux bubble wrap evening gown. The Museum at FIT owns a copy of the same red and black mermaid gown sold by Zuiker, purchased in 2016. It has appeared in the exhibitions Force of Nature (2017) and Exhibitionism: 50 Years of the Museum at FIT (2019). Their copy of Look 29 also appeared in Force of Nature.

== See also ==
- Trashion, fashion created from actual rubbish

== Bibliography ==
- Bolton, Andrew (2011). Alexander McQueen: Savage Beauty. New York City: Metropolitan Museum of Art. ISBN 978-1-58839-412-5. OCLC 687693871.
  - Frankel, Susannah. Introduction. In Bolton (2011), pp. 17–27.
- Bolton, Andrew (2013). Punk: Chaos to Couture. New York City: Metropolitan Museum of Art. ISBN 978-1-58839-489-7. OCLC 844976188.
- Bucci, Alessandro (October 2017). "'Black Duck feathers' or becoming-perfect". Fashion, Style & Popular Culture. 4 (3): 325–340. doi:10.1386/fspc.4.3.325_1. ISSN 2050-0726.
- Callahan, Maureen (2014). Champagne Supernovas: Kate Moss, Marc Jacobs, Alexander McQueen, and the '90s Renegades Who Remade Fashion. New York City: Touchstone Books. ISBN 978-1-4516-4053-3.
- Campbell, Timothy (2020). ""Style Description:/Provenance:/Period:": Martin Margiela, Fashion Authorship, and Romantic Literary History". In Egan, Gerald (ed.). Fashion and Authorship: Literary Production and Cultural Style from the Eighteenth to the Twenty-First Century. Camden: Palgrave Macmillan. pp. 321–340. ISBN 978-3-030-26898-5.
- Costume Institute (2013). Punk: Chaos to Couture [Exhibition Checklist] (Report). New York City: Metropolitan Museum of Art.
- Covolo, Robert (June 2014). "Beyond the low-rise jean: Traces of resurrection on the catwalks of the late Alexander McQueen". The Other Journal (23: Body). Wipf and Stock Publishers: 30–37. ISBN 978-1-63087-237-3.
- Eddleston, John J. (2010). Jack The Ripper - An Encyclopedia. London: Metro Publishing. ISBN 978-1-84358-046-1.
- Elenowitz-Hess, Caroline (16 April 2022). "Reckoning with Highland Rape: Sexuality, Violence, and Power on the Runway". Fashion Theory. 26 (3): 403. doi:10.1080/1362704X.2020.1846325. ISSN 1362-704X. S2CID 229432510.
- Esguerra, Clarissa M.; Hansen, Michaela (2022). Lee Alexander McQueen: Mind, Mythos, Muse. New York City: Delmonico Books. ISBN 978-1-63681-018-8. OCLC 1289986708.
- Faiers, Jonathan (January–February 2023). "Re-make/Re-model". NGV Magazine. No. 38. pp. 26–32.
- Fairer, Robert; Wilcox, Claire (2016). Alexander McQueen: Unseen. New Haven, Connecticut: Yale University Press. ISBN 978-0-300-22267-8. OCLC 946216643.
- Fennetaux, Ariane (Autumn 2018). "Birds of a Feather: Alexander McQueen's Victorian Bestiary". Cahiers victoriens et édouardiens (in French) (88). doi:10.4000/cve.4328. ISSN 0220-5610.
- Fontaine, Kathryne (2025). "La maternité trash dans la littérature québécoise: marginalité ou retour de balancier ?" [Trashy motherhood in Quebec literature: marginality or pendulum swing?]. In Larochelle, Marie-Hélène; Boucher, François-Emmanuël (eds.). Les littératures trash du Québec [Trash literature from Quebec] (in French). Quebec City: Presses de l'Université Laval. pp. 121–168. ISBN 2766303499.
- Fox, Chloe (2012). Vogue On: Alexander McQueen. Vogue on Designers. London: Quadrille Publishing. ISBN 978-1849491136. OCLC 828766756.
- Geczy, Adam; Karaminas, Vicki (2019). Fashion Installation: Body, Space, and Performance. London: Bloomsbury Visual Arts. ISBN 978-1-350-03253-8.
- Gleason, Katherine (2012). Alexander McQueen: Evolution. New York City: Race Point Publishing. ISBN 978-1-61058-837-9. OCLC 783147416.
- Homer, Karen (2023). Little Book of Alexander McQueen: The Story of the Iconic Brand. London: Welbeck Publishing Group. ISBN 978-1-80279-270-6.
- Knox, Kristin (2010). Alexander McQueen: Genius of a Generation. London: A&C Black. ISBN 978-1-4081-3223-4. OCLC 794296806.
- McCaffrey, Robert (24 September 2020). "Alexander McQueen: The Sublime and Melancholy". The Fashion Studies Journal. Archived from the original on 21 September 2022.
- McLoughlin, Marie (September 2013). "Fashion, Royalty, and British Identity: Fashion Exhibitions in London in the Year of the "Jubilympics"". Fashion Theory. 17 (4): 467–482. doi:10.2752/175174113X13673474643282. ISSN 1362-704X.
- Mora, Juliana Luna; Berry, Jess (2 September 2022). "Creative Direction Succession in Luxury Fashion: The Illusion of Immortality at Chanel and Alexander McQueen". Luxury. 9 (2–3): 117–140. doi:10.1080/20511817.2022.2194039. ISSN 2051-1817.
- O'Flaherty, Mark C. (2023). "John Matheson". Narrative Thread: Conversations on Fashion Collections. London: Bloomsbury Visual Arts. pp. 66–85. ISBN 978-1-350-28767-9.
- Savané, Mélissa Diaby (20 June 2021). "The fantasy of ugliness in Alexander McQueen collections (1992–2009): How did literature and the visual arts inspire Alexander McQueen to merge sex and horror in his own art form?". Revista 2i: Estudos de Identidade e Intermedialidade. 3 (3): 99–100. doi:10.21814/2i.3157. ISSN 2184-7010. Archived from the original on 23 October 2023.
- Thomas, Dana (2015). Gods and Kings: The Rise and Fall of Alexander McQueen and John Galliano. New York City: Penguin Publishing. ISBN 978-1-101-61795-3. OCLC 951153602.
- Waplington, Nick (2013). Alexander McQueen: Working Process. Bologna, Italy: Damiani Books. ISBN 978-1-84796-085-6. OCLC 855200647.
  - Frankel, Susannah. "Forward". In Waplington (2013), pp. 2–5.
- Watt, Judith (2012). Alexander McQueen: The Life and the Legacy. New York City: Harper Design. ISBN 978-1-84796-085-6. OCLC 892706946.
- Wilcox, Claire, ed. (2015). Alexander McQueen. New York City: Abrams Books. ISBN 978-1-4197-1723-9. OCLC 891618596.
  - Bethune, Kate. "Encyclopedia of Collections". In Wilcox (2015), pp. 303–326.
  - Cullen, Oriole. "Crowning Glory". In Wilcox (2015), pp. 210–219.
  - Evans, Caroline. "Modelling McQueen: Hard Grace". In Wilcox (2015), pp. 189–201.
  - Faiers, Jonathan. "Nature Boy". In Wilcox (2015), pp. 123–137.
  - Fury, Alex. "Show, and Tell". In Wilcox (2015), pp. 220–233.
  - Lodwick, Keith. "Coup de Théâtre". In Wilcox (2015), pp. 247–251.
  - Miller, Janice. "Making-Up". In Wilcox (2015), pp. 234–241.
  - O'Neill, Alistair. "The Shining and Chic". In Wilcox (2015), pp. 261–280.
  - Persson, Helen. "Walking Out". In Wilcox (2015), pp. 110–115.
  - Skogh, Lisa. "Museum of the Mind". In Wilcox (2015), pp. 178–188.
- Wilson, Andrew (2015). Alexander McQueen: Blood Beneath the Skin. New York City: Simon and Schuster. ISBN 978-1-4767-7674-3. OCLC 1310585849.
