= Peter Philips (make-up artist) =

Belgian make-up artist

Peter Philips is a Belgian make-up artist, and currently the creative and image director of Christian Dior makeup.

== Career ==
Philips was born in Antwerp, Belgium. After obtaining a degree in graphic design while attending school in Brussels, he returned to education to study fashion at Antwerp's Academie Royale des Beaux-Arts. In his final year as a fashion student, he was introduced to makeup while working backstage at Paris Fashion Week. “The academy sent a bus from Antwerp to Paris,” he later tells Vogue, “and we went backstage helping dress. When I saw all those hair and makeup teams, I thought, I can do that.”

After graduating in 1993, Philips built up his portfolio by doing test shoots with aspiring photographers and stylists, including Willy Vanderperre, and Olivier Rizzo. A pivotal moment in Philips' career came at a Raf Simons shoot, when he drew a Mickey Mouse face onto a model in perfect scale. "People flipped out," Philips recalls. "They really remember the spectacular things you do, and the pure beauty things they take for granted. I learned a lot from that."

He began to achieve global recognition for his work and collaborated with major labels and photographers such as Dries Van Noten, Fendi, Inez Van Lamsweerde, and Peter Lindbergh.

He came to the attention of Karl Lagerfeld while the designer was at Fendi's helm, and was eventually invited to meet the then creative directors of Chanel Make-up, Heidi Morawetz and Dominique Moncourtois, who had jointly held the position for more than 30 years.

Chanel Makeup appointed Philips its creative director in 2008, a position described by Vogue magazine as the "most coveted job in cosmetics". Philips is credited with the reinvigoration of the fashion house's beauty division, his range of trend-setting collections included the 2009 sell-out nail polish colour Jade Le Vernis - a bottle of which was reportedly resold on eBay for $100. He was also noted for his use of unusual materials, incorporating feathers, pearls, and fabrics into his looks. For Chanel's spring 2014 show, he designed a well-received selection of eye makeup in "bold swipes of color" made from common fingerpaints. In February 2013, Philips stepped down as creative director of Chanel Make-Up.

In March 2014, It was announced that Philips was designated the new creative and image director for Dior makeup, replacing Pat McGrath in her previous role of overseeing the makeup looks for upcoming Dior fashion shows.

Philips is represented by New Art Corps.
