= Highland Rape =

1995 fashion collection by Alexander McQueen

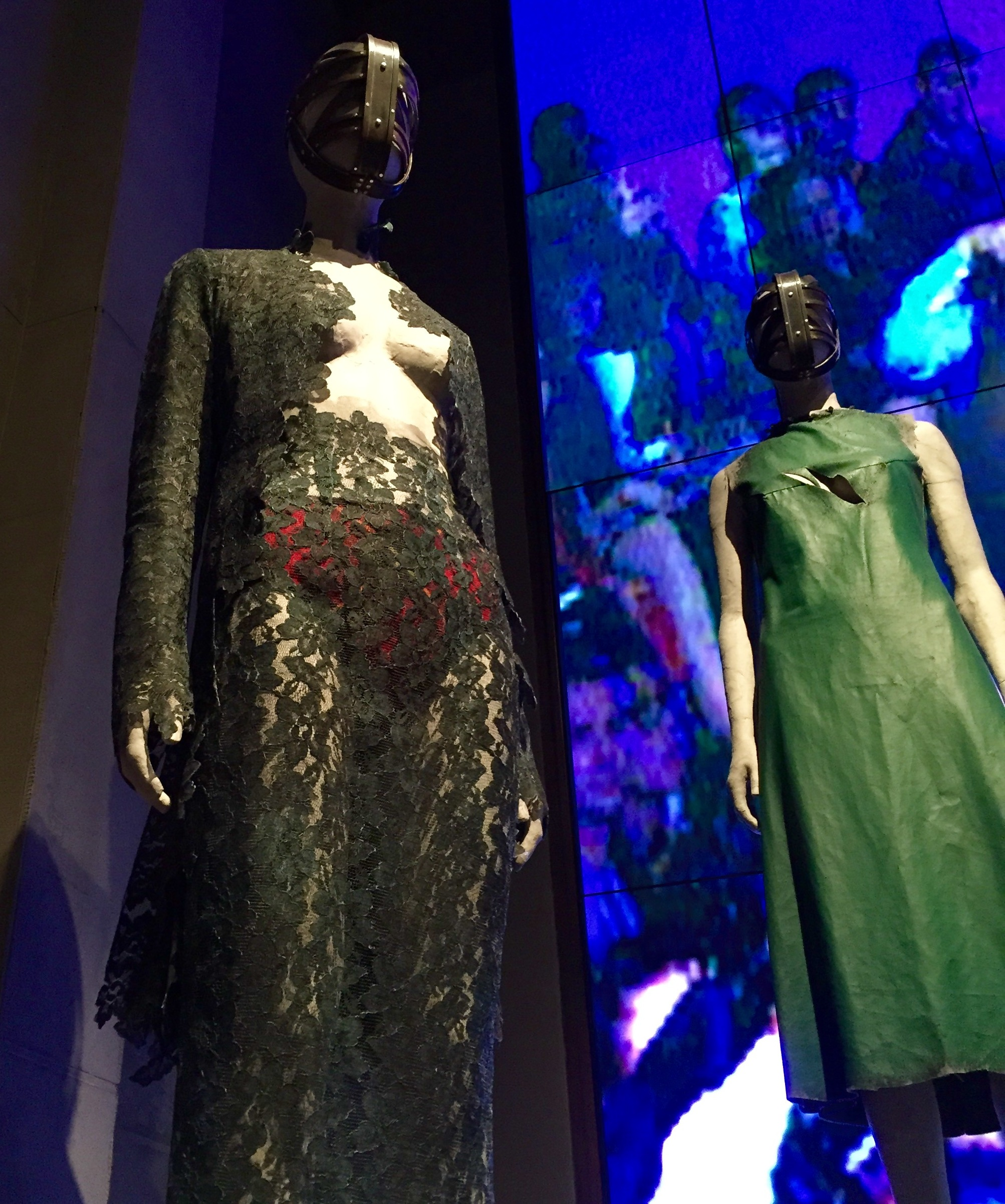
Outfits from Highland Rape, Autumn/Winter 1995–96, presented at Alexander McQueen: Savage Beauty

Highland Rape is the sixth collection by British designer Alexander McQueen, released for the Autumn/Winter 1995 season of his eponymous fashion house. Like many of McQueen's early collections, this collection featured untraditional women's tailoring heightening the models' figures and sexuality. Although very poorly received critically and publicly, the Highland Rape is one of McQueen's most famous shows that solidified his name in the fashion world. The runway show was presented on 13 March 1995 during London Fashion Week as his 1995 Autumn/Winter collection. The collection was dark and nationalistic, most notably epitomising the McQueen house's use of Scottish tartan and the bumster trouser, designed to show as much of the torso as possible without showing all of the crotch or bum.

== Background ==
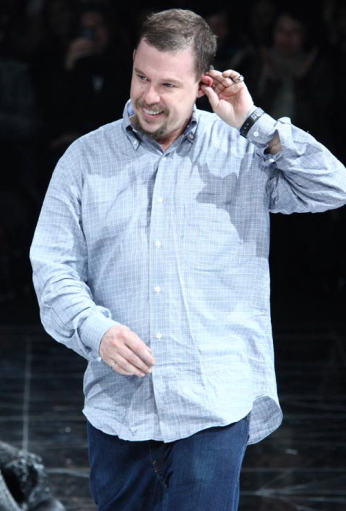
Alexander McQueen

=== Early life ===
British designer Alexander McQueen (born Lee Alexander McQueen) was known in the fashion industry for his imaginative and controversial designs and runway shows comparable to performance art pieces. McQueen was born in England but is of Scottish descent, which quickly became an integral element of his work. Much of his work revolves around his longtime fascinations and borderline obsessions with sex, death, violence, history, his family and their lineage. All of these components stayed fundamental in his creative process and throughout his career, from his very first collection to his very last. McQueen's mother was a teacher and his father a taxi cab driver. He and his three siblings were raised in a troubled home, witnessing and experiencing domestic abuse, financial struggles and more in a less fortunate neighbourhood of London's East End.

=== Early work ===
McQueen began working in fashion as an apprentice for Anderson & Sheppard tailors on Savile Row before working as a pattern maker for Gieves & Hawkes. He worked in various positions in fashion throughout England and Italy for many years but his time working on Savile Row gave him his renowned reputation as an expert in tailoring. In his early 20s, he approached the founder and teacher of the Central Saint Martins postgraduate fashion course, Bobby Hillson, in search of a job but was instead granted admission to the program. From this he debuted his first collection, his graduate collection, Jack the Ripper Stalks His Victims catching the attention of British fashion editor Isabella Blow who would come purchase this entire collection and become his lifelong friend and muse.

== Concept and clothing ==
The Highland Rape collection is one of McQueen's most autobiographical collections and the first to significantly reference his family's Scottish heritage, introducing the McQueen family tartan in his designs. McQueen's designs for the collection were inspired by two major events in Scottish history, the Jacobite risings and the Highland Clearances. The Jacobite risings were a series of rebellions in Great Britain which occurred between 1689 and 1745, which saw supporters of the deposed House of Stuart attempt to restore a Stuart monarch to the British throne by overthrowing the House of Hanover. The Highland Clearances were a series of forced evictions of a significant number of tenants in the Scottish Highlands by their landlords, which occurred mostly in two phases from 1750 to 1860. McQueen's Scottish ancestors had been forcibly evicted during the Highland Clearances, which proved to be a source of inspiration for McQueen. Alongside the historical influences of the Jacobite risings and the Highland Clearances, McQueen derived inspiration for the collection from witnessing the domestic abuse his sister endured at the hands of her husband. All concepts coming back to the violence enacted upon women of Scotland with his claimed intent of empowering them.

The collection featured tattered, stained and dirtied garments barely held together let alone covering much of the models' bodies. Most pieces featured the McQueen family tartan, lace, sheer fabrics or knits in a primarily dark colour palette of blacks and greys with pops of reds and yellows taken from the family tartan and the rare blue, green or violet. Nearly every piece was torn or cut-out in some way, in some cases looking very intentional and others looking completely unintentional. Even without the show setting, models' performance or movement, the clothes still convey an intense feeling of darkness, tragedy and horror.

One memorable look was a dress made of a grey-green and bronze tarnished lace that hung on one shoulder. The entire dress was ripped and cut with one cut-out sitting at the crotch making the garment appear as if it was about to fall apart at any moment. It wanted to give the idea that this woman had just been through violence and brutality, an unsettling sight to an audience. Another look was a simple, black, knit dress with a slim fit with one element being a v-neck featuring a torn slit from the top left shoulder to the middle of the torso revealing the model's entire breast.

Finally, one look featured a McQueen tartan clad jacket with a lace-trimmed, high neck collar and a pair of ultra low waist presumably leather trousers deemed an Alexander McQueen trademark, the "bumster trouser". The jacket did not come anywhere near covering more than the model's back, shoulders, neck and upper-arms leaving her front completely exposed. The now famous "bumster trousers" barely covered the model's genitals and revealed part of her buttcrack. McQueen commented on the creation of the style saying "I wanted to elongate the body, not just show the bum. To me, that part of the body—not so much the buttocks, but the bottom of the spine—that’s the most erotic part of anyone’s body, man or woman." The style of trouser was made famous in the Highland Rape but can be seen in the fashion house's collections decades later.

== Catwalk show ==
The catwalk show for Highland Rape took place on 13 March 1995 at the National History Museum in London and was McQueen's first to be presented under the British Fashion Council during London Fashion Week. The music was loud and inconsistent, at times experimental rock and others similar to house music with sounds of thunder and bells clanging. The elevated catwalk was both covered and lined with what appeared to be dead shrubs and flowers which the models walked over, kicking the decor up, getting caught on their shoes. Every model was dressed and walking very differently, as one stumbled down the catwalk with a highly animated face of terror or anxiety and little to no clothing on the next model was walking classically and sophisticatedly with a well-tailored, clean cut sweater and trouser look on. Some models imitated a military march with arms stiff and rigid, turning on the catwalk as if for inspection while others slinked down smoothly with a smirk on their face or even biting their lip seductively. Some models nearly hit each other as they passed each other by, one exiting and one entering the stage and others almost walk through another as if they do not even see them. In the end, all models returned to the stage out of their assumed characters clapping and cheering as Alexander McQueen himself appeared briefly on the catwalk with all-black contacts in before running off as the models followed behind him.

== Critical reception ==
“It thematises traumata in addition to the dialectics of pleasure and pain, eroticism and death, man and machine, love and brutality, victim and aggressor, as well as examining power and threat, desire and vulnerability”

— Loschek, When Clothes Become Fashion: Design and Innovation Systems

The public reception of Highland Rape has almost always been negative, both at the time of release and many decades later. While many praised him for it, many also attribute this show to sparking the longterm critiquing and labelling of McQueen being a misogynist. He forever denied this claim and took to defending Highland Rape, saying that the title of the show did not refer to the rape of women but rather "England's rape of Scotland". Fashion critics have challenged this defence by claiming that this explanation does not account for the show's blatant glamourisation of sexual violence against women, and how it was never clear whether McQueen's depiction of women meant he was "for or against women". The criticism of Highland Rape propelled his name forward in the fashion world, and he became the new creative director of French fashion house Givenchy just one year after its debut. This criticism reappeared throughout his entire career, often in relation to the good it did for his name. Although he was never able to escape it, it never seemed to tarnish the reputation of his talents.
