= Hans Kristian Rausing =

Swedish billionaire (born 1963)

Sir Hans Kristian Rausing
- Born: 15 June 1963 (age 63); Lund, Sweden
- Occupation: Philanthropist
- Known for: Tetra Pak shareholding and opioid addiction
- Spouses: Eva Kemeny (m. 1992; died 2012) Julia Delves Broughton (m. 2014; died 2024)
- Parents: Hans Rausing (father); Märit Rausing (mother)
- Relatives: Ruben Rausing (paternal grandfather); Lisbet Rausing (sister); Sigrid Rausing (sister)

Sir Hans Kristian Rausing (Swedish pronunciation: [hɑːns ˈkrɪ̌sːtɪjan ˈrâʊsɪŋ]; born 15 June 1963) is a Swedish billionaire and the son of packaging industrialist Hans Rausing. His grandfather Ruben Rausing founded the food-packaging giant Tetra Pak. The family has an estimated $12 billion fortune.

Rausing did not enter the family business. Instead, he travelled in his youth before meeting Eva Kemeny while in drug rehabilitation in the United States. On 16 October 1992, the couple married. In common with other members of the Rausing family, they settled in London (and Barbados), and donated millions of pounds to charities, in particular those concerned with drug awareness and addiction prevention. They built and funded a rehabilitation centre on the Caribbean island of Barbados.

In April 2008, Rausing and his wife were arrested on drugs charges after Mrs Rausing allegedly tried to take small amounts of crack cocaine and heroin into the United States embassy in London. Quantities of crack cocaine and heroin were then found in their home. They were charged with possession of a large amount of cocaine and smaller quantities of crack, heroin and cannabis after a Scotland Yard investigation. They admitted possessing Class A drugs (cocaine and heroin) and received a police caution.

On 10 July 2012 Rausing was again arrested on suspicion of possessing class A drugs, after which his wife Eva Rausing was found dead at the couple's Belgravia home wrapped in bin bags and bedlinen. Rausing failed to report his wife's death for two months. On 17 July 2012, he was charged with delaying burial of her body. He pleaded guilty and was sentenced to 10 months in jail, suspended for two years. The couple had four children.

He married art expert Julia Delves Broughton, daughter of Sir Evelyn Delves Broughton, 12th Baronet and sister of Isabella Blow, in June 2014. Together they set up the Julia and Hans Rausing Trust, which gives away around £100 million each year, making it one of the largest philanthropic funds in the UK. The trust has supported charities like the Trussell Trust and FareShare. Julia Rausing died on 18 April 2024, aged 63.

Rausing was knighted for services to the arts in the King's Birthday Honours of 2025.
