= Angels and Demons (collection) =

2010 fashion collection by Alexander McQueen

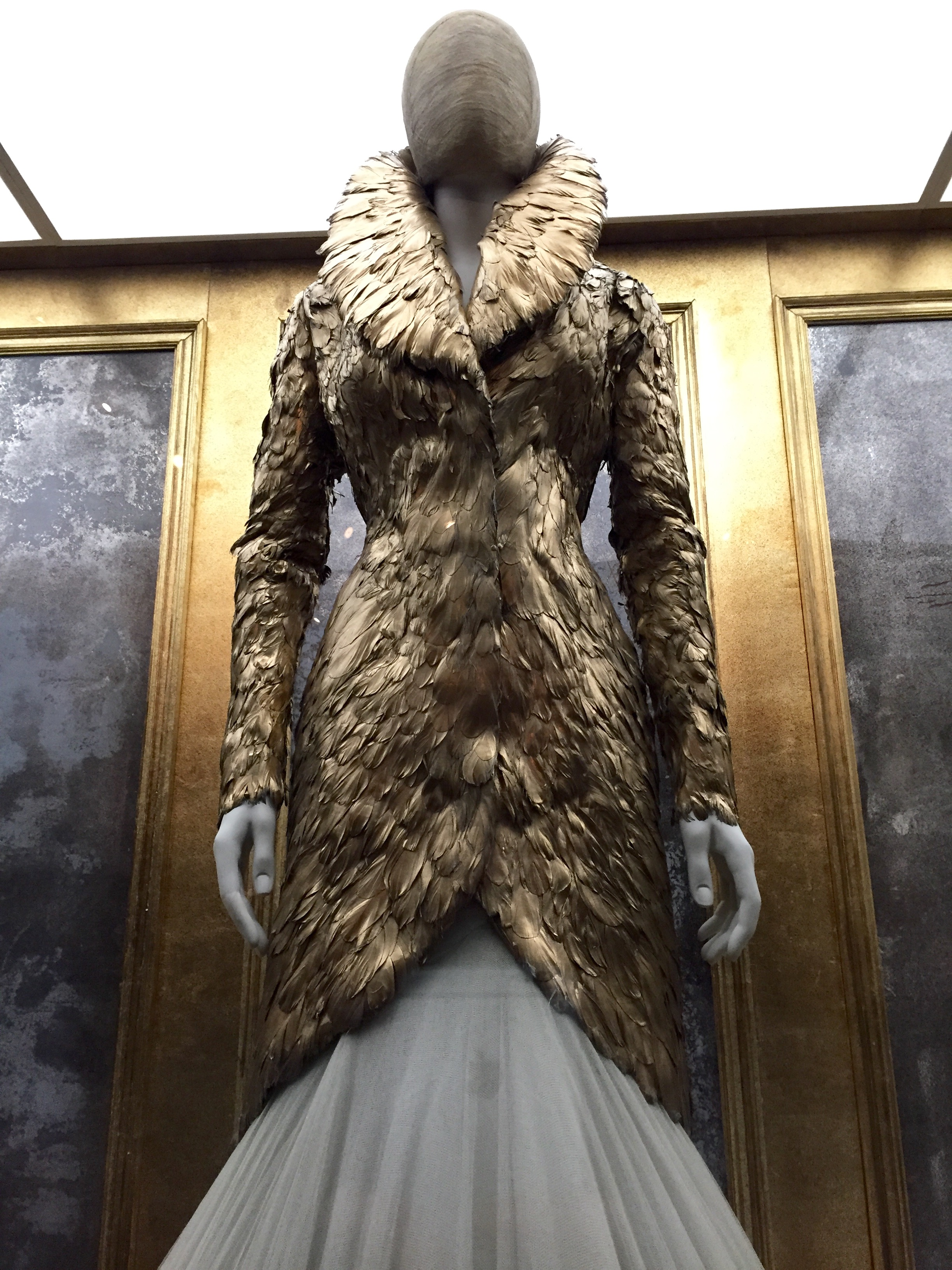
Final outfit from Angels and Demons presented at Alexander McQueen: Savage Beauty (2015)

Angels and Demons is the thirty-sixth and final collection by British fashion designer Alexander McQueen, released for the Autumn/Winter 2010 season of his eponymous fashion house. Aesthetically, the collection drew on religious paintings of the afterlife from the Medieval and Renaissance periods, as well as the imperial dress and art of the Byzantine Empire. It incorporated traditional tailoring and dressmaking techniques that McQueen had learned early in his career while also featuring the sophisticated digitally engineered prints he had experimented with in the past few seasons. McQueen committed suicide before the collection was finished; his close collaborator Sarah Burton completed the sixteen outfits that had been in progress at the time of his death. The unofficial title is taken from a Twitter post McQueen made shortly before his death.

In lieu of a full-scale runway show, the Alexander McQueen brand showed the sixteen completed looks privately in a series of presentations to small groups of guests on 9 and 10 March 2010, at the Hôtel de Clermont-Tonnerre in Paris. (Note: There are several mansions in Paris with the name Hôtel de Clermont-Tonnerre. McQueen's show was held in the one that serves as the headquarters of PPR, which owns McQueen's label; it is located on the rue François-I^{er}.) The staging was deliberately kept simple, making no attempt to emulate McQueen's bent for showmanship. Polina Kasina, McQueen's longtime fit model, wore the collection's final and best-known ensemble, a gold feathered coat over white tulle skirt. The presentations closed with the whispered words "There is no more"; the models did not return for the traditional final walk.

Critical reception for the clothing was positive. Many reviewers noted the uncanny feeling evoked by the religious theme when juxtaposed with McQueen's suicide. Retrospective analysis has focused on the theme, with particular attention paid to whether it was indicative of McQueen's mental state. Ensembles from Angels and Demons are held by several museums and have appeared in exhibitions such as the McQueen retrospective Alexander McQueen: Savage Beauty.

== Background ==
British fashion designer Alexander McQueen was known for his imaginative, sometimes controversial designs, and dramatic fashion shows. Over the course of his career, which lasted from 1992 until his death in 2010, he explored a broad range of ideas and themes, particularly sexuality, death, violence, romanticism, and historicism. He learned tailoring as an apprentice on Savile Row, and dressmaking as head designer at French fashion house Givenchy. (Note: From October 1996 to October 2001, McQueen was simultaneously head designer at Givenchy and at his own label.) Although he worked in ready-to-wear – clothing produced for retail sale – his showpiece designs featured a degree of craftsmanship that verged on haute couture.

been a fucking awful week but my friends have been great but now i have to some how pull myself together and finish with the HELLS ANGELS & PROLIFIC DAEMONS!!!!!!!!!!!!!!!!!!!!!!!!!!!!!!!!!

— Alexander McQueen's personal Twitter account, 7 February 2010

McQueen's life had been turbulent in every sense. His upbringing was traumatic: he was a victim of childhood sexual abuse and witnessed his sisters experiencing domestic violence from their partners. McQueen felt the fashion industry was toxic and suffocating, and he was often ambivalent about continuing his career as a designer. Relentless pressure to perform contributed to his persistent depression, anxiety, and insomnia. Since the 1990s, he had abused alcohol and drugs to varying degrees to cope. In 2007, his estranged friend Isabella Blow, who had been a formative influence, committed suicide; McQueen was devastated. In the following years, his addictions escalated and he grew obsessed with death.

On 2 February 2010, McQueen's mother died aged seventy-five. He had been close with her all his life and was distraught at the thought of having to attend her funeral, which was scheduled for 12 February. In his grief, he isolated himself and turned to drugs and alcohol. He spent the next several days making gestures that have been taken in retrospect as him setting his affairs in order, such as giving away possessions and telling people he loved them. Some time after 3 am on 11 February, he committed suicide; his body was discovered later that morning.

== Concept and creative process ==
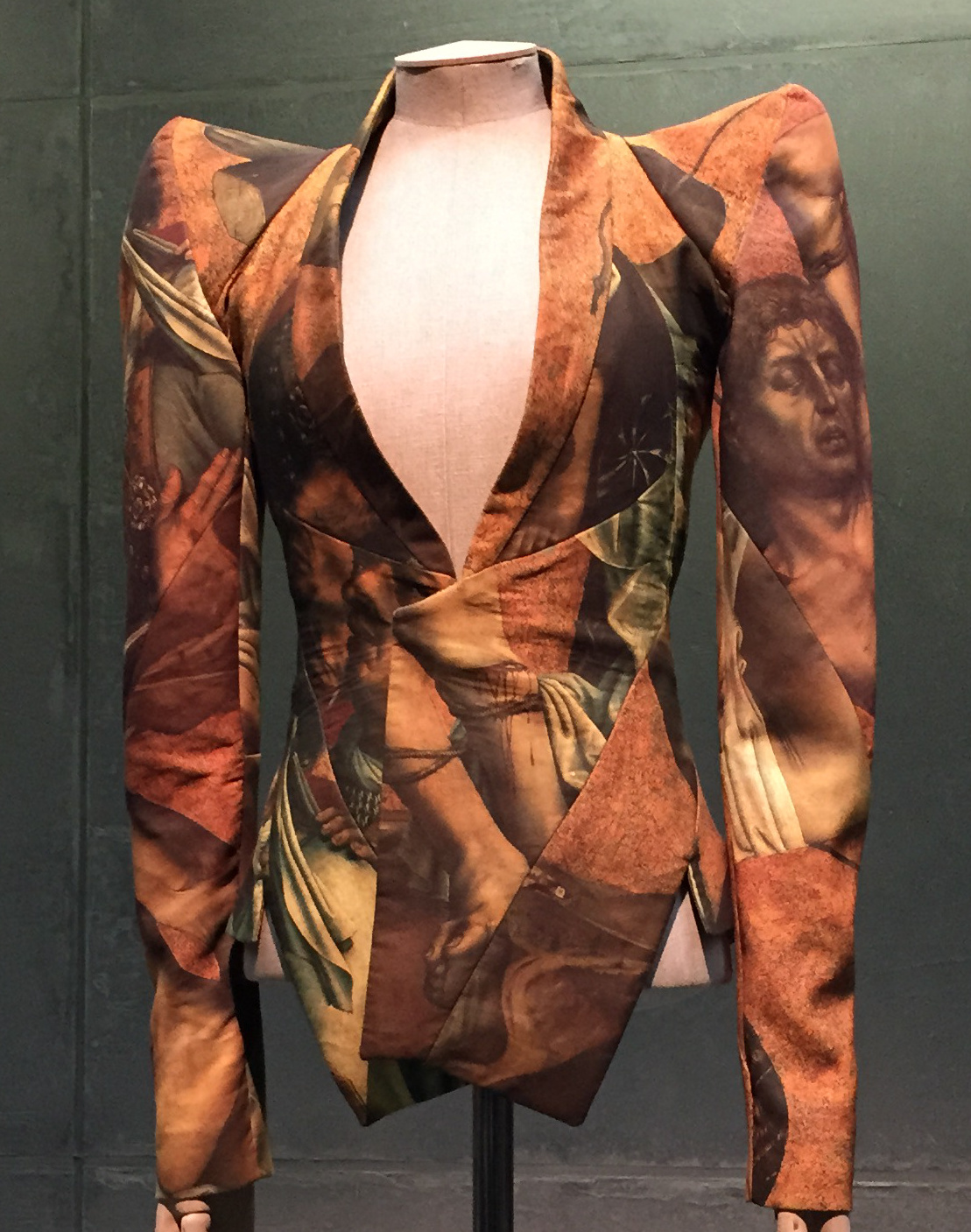
Jacket from It's a Jungle Out There (Autumn/Winter 1997)

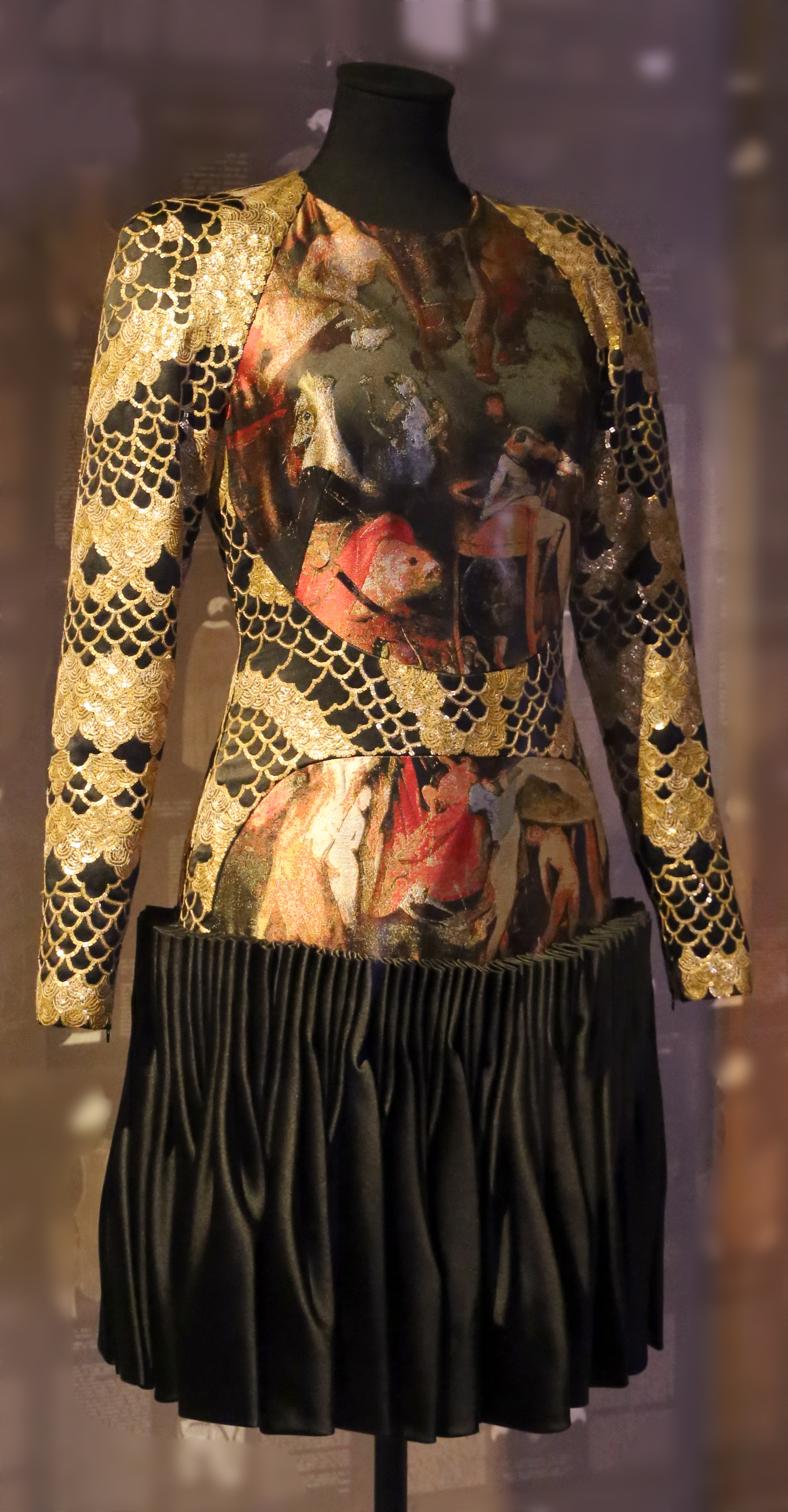
Look 2 from Angels and Demons

Comparison of garments printed with religious paintings

Angels and Demons (Autumn/Winter 2010) is the thirty-sixth and final collection McQueen made for his eponymous fashion house. At the time of McQueen's suicide, the collection was unfinished; the sixteen outfits he had been working on were in various stages of completion. (Note: Some sources incorrectly report fifteen.) A complete collection was normally at least thirty. Sarah Burton, McQueen's head of womenswear and right-hand woman, completed the existing items with his team. The unofficial title Angels and Demons is taken from a Twitter post McQueen made on 7 February.

Visually, the collection relied heavily on religious paintings of the afterlife from the Medieval and Renaissance periods, as well as the imperial dress and art of the Byzantine Empire. McQueen felt the clothing in these paintings was depicted with a particular type of luminosity, and he sought to replicate that in his designs. According to Burton, he was "looking at the art of the Dark Ages but finding light and beauty in it". He had incorporated paintings into his work before; It's a Jungle Out There (Autumn/Winter 1997) had featured prints with details taken from the paintings of Flemish and Dutch Old Masters.

McQueen's previous three collections had been focused on technological innovations. Natural Dis-tinction Un-natural Selection (Spring/Summer 2009), The Horn of Plenty (Autumn/Winter 2009), and Plato's Atlantis (Spring/Summer 2010) all made use of sophisticated digitally engineered prints, and Plato's was the first livestreamed fashion show. For Angels and Demons, McQueen intended to shift his focus to handicrafts, which he felt was disappearing from the fashion industry and broader culture. Many designs featured traditional techniques for pleating, embroidery, and tailoring. Despite the emphasis on tradition, McQueen continued his experiments with digital printing with Angels and Demons, creating what Burton later described as a "juxtaposition of the old and the new". Entire paintings or selected details were rendered digitally, then either printed onto or woven into fabric. The resulting textiles were then engineered into garments.

In many ways, the collection encapsulated McQueen's entire career, incorporating the tailoring and dressmaking techniques he had learned early on, as well as his tendency to experiment with shape and style. The finished collection featured elaborate showpiece designs in a palette of gold and red, with rich fabrics like brocade and silk. Shorter dresses were followed with long draped gowns. Some patterns were made to evoke the look of marble. Embroidery of tigers and lions on some items may have been drawn from traditional Tibetan art or from Byzantine culture. The shoes were elaborately sculpted with motifs including ivy, skulls, and wings, possibly referencing the intricate sculptural work of seventeenth-century master woodcarver Grinling Gibbons. McQueen had previously drawn on Gibbons's work in No. 13 (Spring/Summer 1999), which featured a pair of intricately carved wooden prosthetic legs.

Angels and Demons heavily relied on avian imagery, with prints of wings and birds, as well as garments embellished with gilded feathers. McQueen loved birds and had used these motifs throughout his career. In this collection, appearing alongside prints of winged angels, they took on a double meaning that reinforced the religious theme.

=== Individual ensembles ===
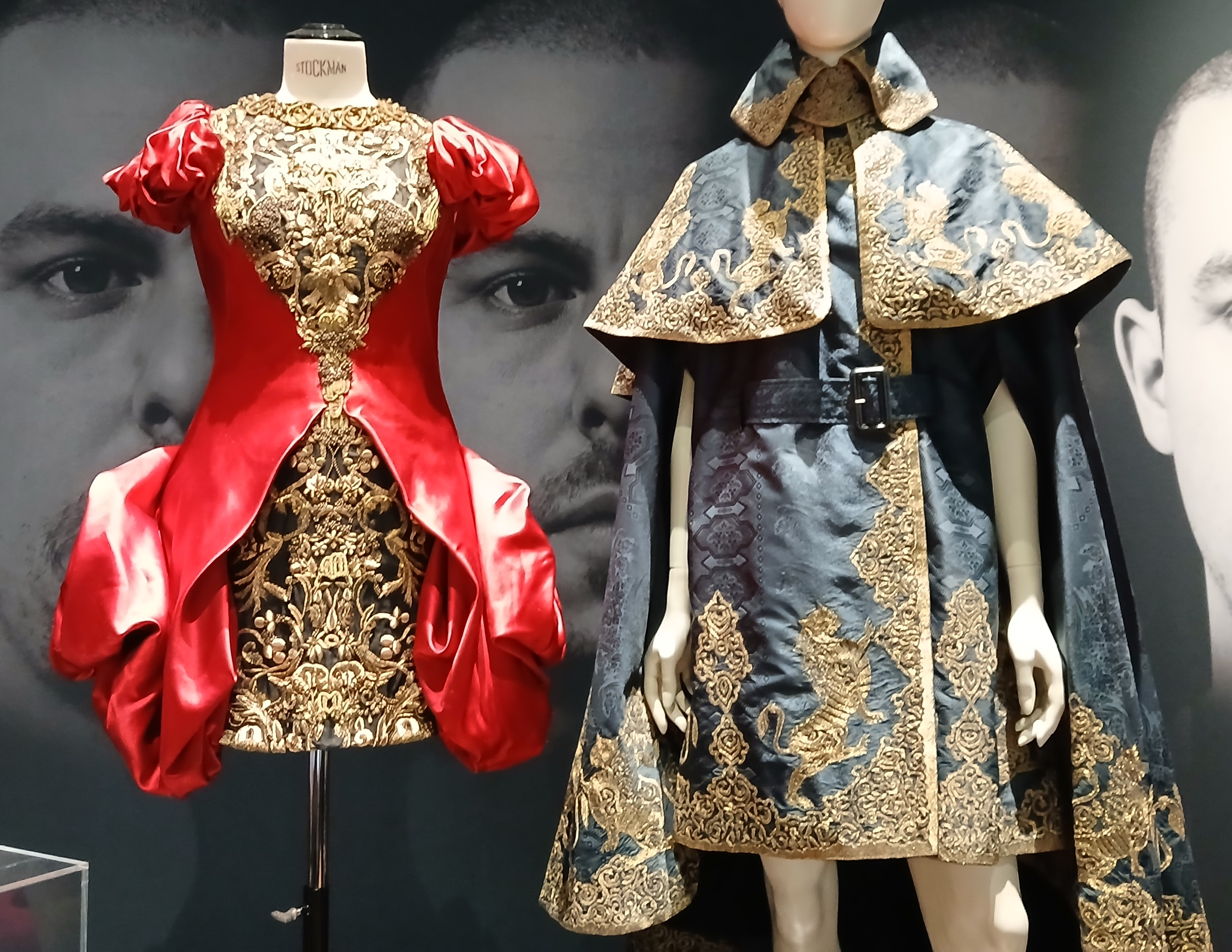
Looks 3 and 8 presented at the House of McQueen exhibition, October 2025

The first look is a long-sleeved red bodice with heavy gold embroidery, with a short pleated skirt in red satin. Look 2 is a similar style with a black and gold pattern on the sleeves paired with a black pleated skirt. The bodice of this look is printed with details portraying Hell and demons from three separate paintings by Early Netherlandish painting painter Hieronymus Bosch: The Last Judgment (c. 1482 or later), The Garden of Earthly Delights (c. 1500), and The Temptation of St Anthony (c. 1501 or later). Author Kristin Knox considered the use of these images on the garment to be an "unsettling rumination on the afterlife" on McQueen's part. Fashion theorist Kirstin Kennedy felt that the prints reinforced the collection's religious themes with an oblique humour. She noted that on the rear of the garment, a hellish bagpipe from The Last Judgement is positioned "at the base of the bodice, immediately above the wearer's anus".

Look 3 is a short dress in a black and gold brocade with puffs of red satin at the shoulders and hips, paired on the runway with black leather thigh-high boots. Look 4 is a belted gold brocade minidress with an asymmetrically pleated hem, worn with a statement choker and matching oversized bracelets in what appeared to be stained glass. Look 5 is a gold-toned minidress with matching glove, both printed with details from Adoration of the Magi Altarpiece (c. 1440–1442) by German Renaissance painter Stefan Lochner. The slightly asymmetrical hem reveals an underskirt of gold-painted duck feathers. On the runway, the look was paired with gold high heels embellished with beads and gemstones.

Look 6 comprises a short kimono-style coat in red silk with flared sleeves, printed with tigers. On the runway, it was belted at the waist and worn over a gold mesh shirt and black thigh-high boots with gold soles. Bente Kiilerich thought it may have been inspired by the royal mantle of Roger II of Sicily. Look 7 is a tailored pantsuit in gold brocade patterned with angels. The top had an experimental puffed silhouette. Look 8 is a short coatdress and matching cape in black with gold Asian-inspired embroidery. Look 9 is a frock coat and matching skirt in black with gold printing.

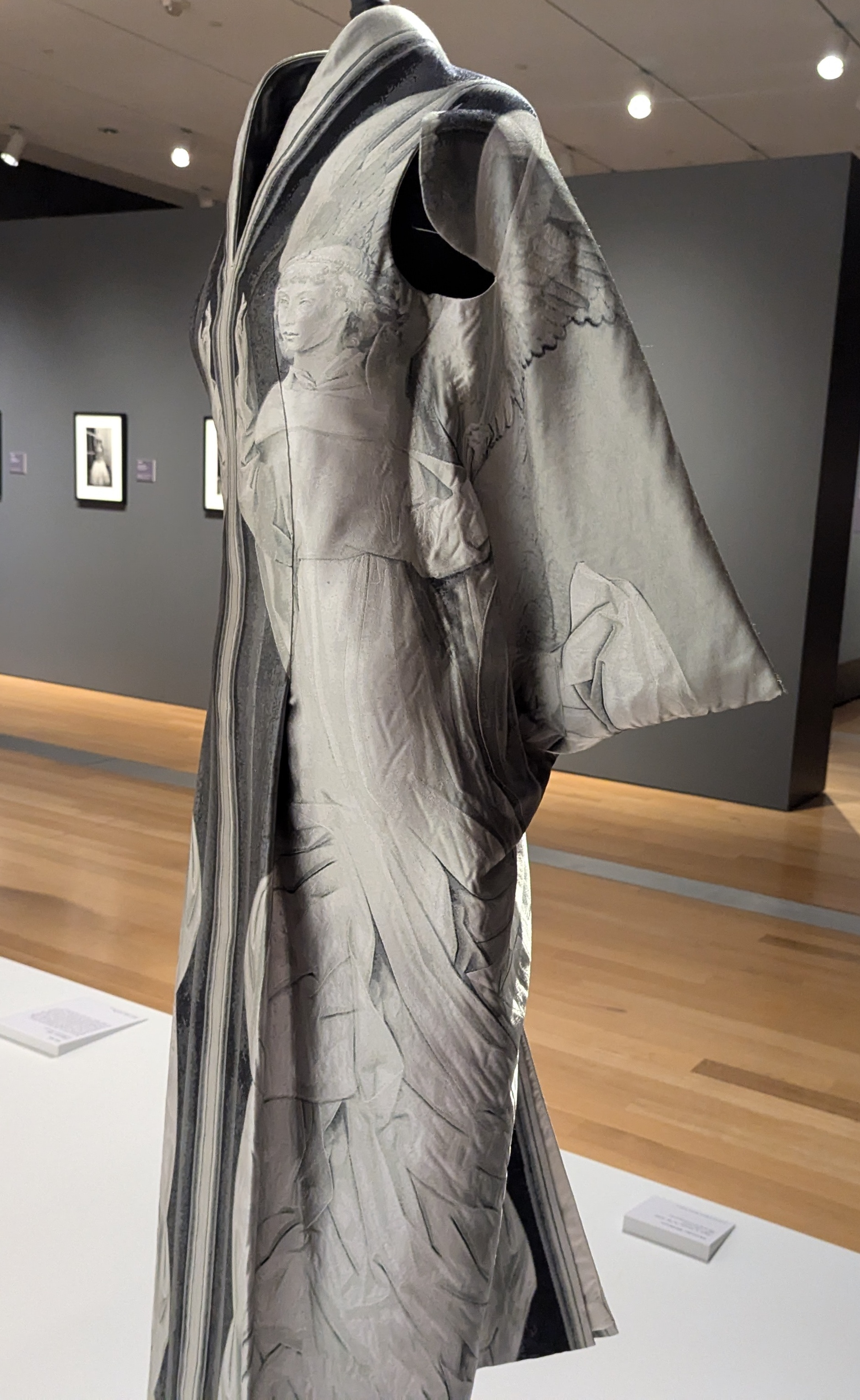
Front

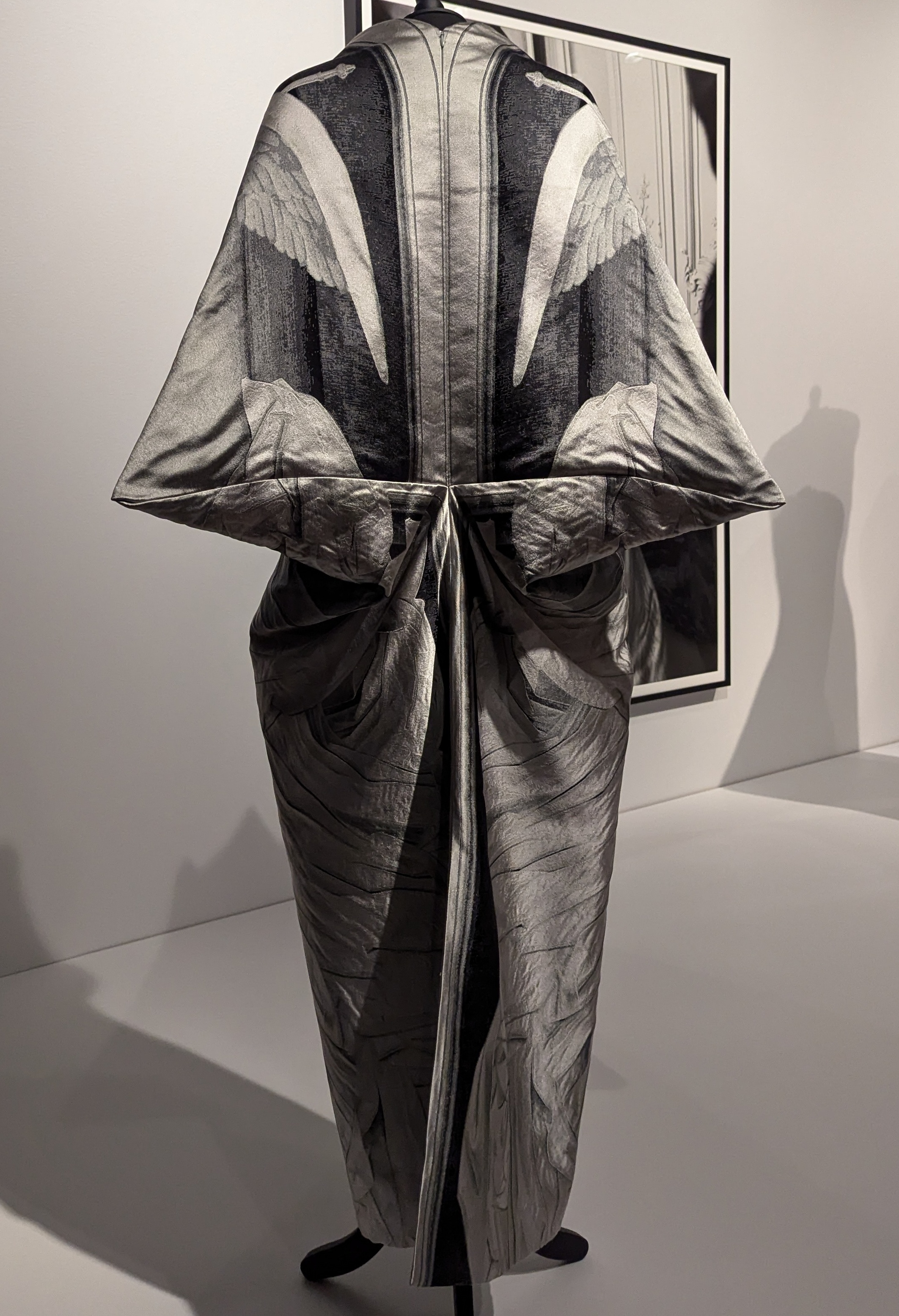
Back

Look 10 at Lee Alexander McQueen & Ann Ray - Rendez-Vous (2024)

Looks 10 through 12 are long gowns in pale grey with monochrome prints. Looks 10 and 11 feature details taken from the Portinari Altarpiece (c. 1475) by Hugo van der Goes. Look 10 has a double print of the archangel Gabriel mirrored on the front of the dress, with the angel's wings wrapping around to the back, where loose folds of fabric also evoke wings. Curator Andrew Bolton found the doubling reminiscent of the closed panels of an altarpiece. The print on Look 11 is a detail of Mary, the mother of Jesus. Look 12 has a chiffon skirt under a tailored bodice with beaded embellishment on the chest and angel wings printed on the back.

Look 13 is a white full-length dress with vertically ruched fabric down the centre, with gold embroidery on either side. Look 14 is a full-length red gown with cape, both in cardinal red and hand-embellished with embroidery and gold sequins, evoking the elaborate garments worn by Byzantine empresses. Judith Watt felt the rich embellishments on Look 14 echoed the "magic" of the Fall/Winter 1990 collection by Romeo Gigli, with whom McQueen had worked before founding his own company. Look 15 has a black long-sleeved bodice with heavy embellishment and embroidery all over, with a long black pleated skirt.

The best-known look from the collection is the last, Look 16, a tailored long coat with high ruff collar. The entire coat is made from gilded feathers, and it is worn over a white tulle skirt with gold hem embroidery. Andrew Wilson felt it drew on Gibbons as well as Icarus, a figure from Greek mythology who is said to have flown too close to the sun. Knox suggested the feathers and bird imagery reflected "a sort of immortal finality". The ensemble may have been a reference to the gold and white palette of McQueen's first haute couture collection for Givenchy, The Search for the Golden Fleece (Spring/Summer 1997).

== Runway show ==
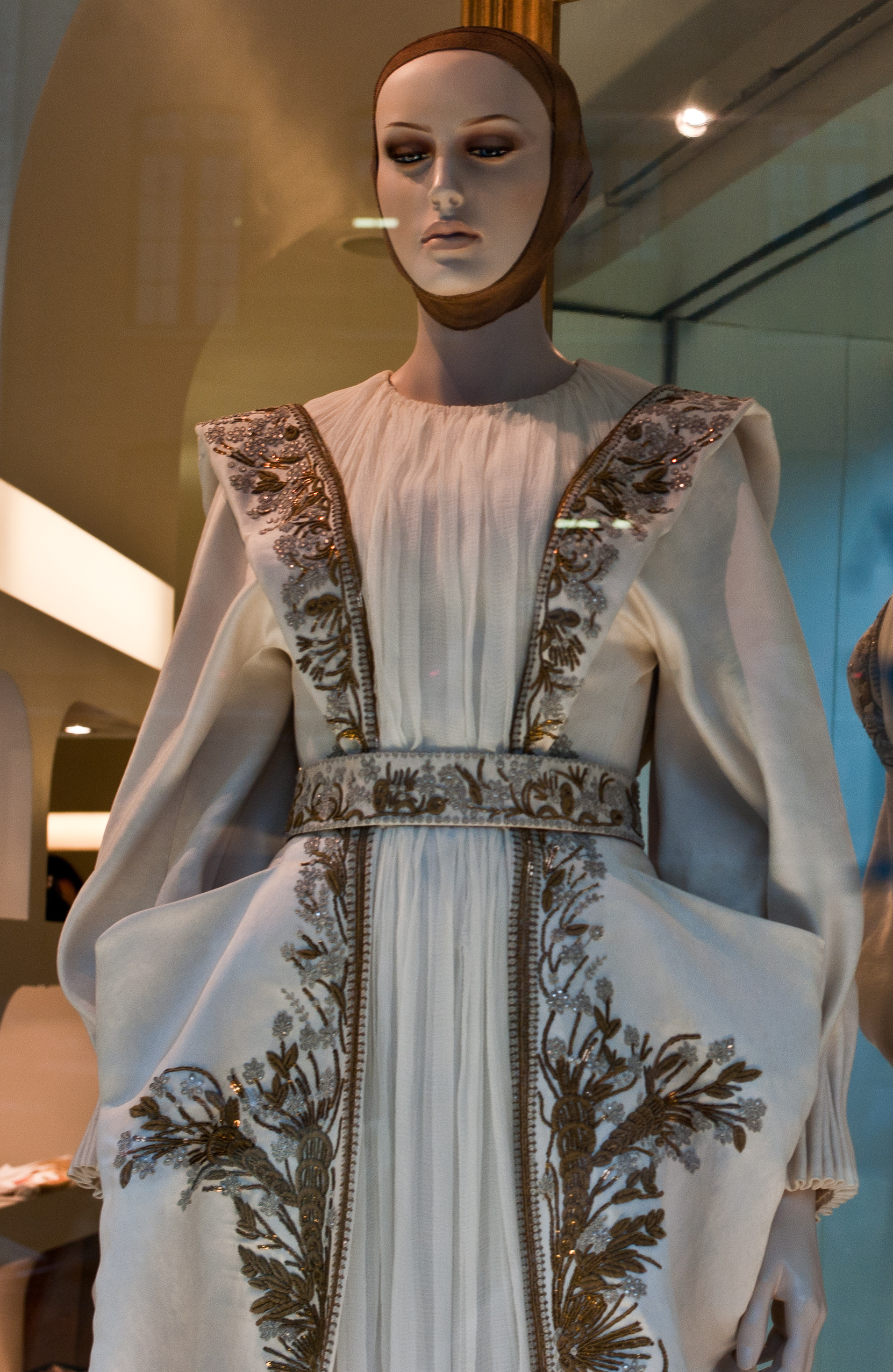
Look 13 in the window of an Alexander McQueen store, September 2010

Angels and Demons was originally scheduled to be presented on 9 March 2010 at La Conciergerie in Paris, but the full-scale show was cancelled after McQueen's death. Instead, the Alexander McQueen brand showed the sixteen completed looks privately to small groups of guests on 9 and 10 March. The presentations were held in the Louis XV salon at the Hôtel de Clermont-Tonnerre on the rue François-I^{er}. The staging was deliberately kept simple, making no attempt to emulate McQueen's bent for theatrical presentations. Guests were seated on boxes around the periphery of the room. Before the show, they were all given a note that read "each piece is unique, as was he". For the soundtrack, the brand used the classical music that McQueen had listened to in his studio while working on the collection: selections from the work of Ludwig van Beethoven, Joseph Haydn, and Henry Purcell.

Peter Philips and Guido Palau handled hair and make-up, respectively. (Note: McQueen consulted with Philip Treacy, a longtime collaborator, about creating headpieces for the runway show. He wanted Treacy to replicate a ship-shaped hat Treacy had made for Blow in the 1990s, and which had been placed on her casket. Treacy was reluctant due to the design's complexity, but agreed to make one in white for the collection. It is unclear if the hat was actually produced; it was not worn in the private presentations of the collection.) The models were styled with faces powdered stark white. They wore gold head wraps, some with gold feathers in the style of Mohican haircuts. (Note: "Mohican haircut" is the British term for a haircut usually referred to as a "Mohawk haircut" in American English.) The wraps were reminiscent of the head coverings worn by many women in the Medieval and Renaissance paintings McQueen was referencing. They may also have been a reference to similar head coverings worn in McQueen's Voss (Spring/Summer 2001). The Mohican-esque feathers referred to McQueen's history of referencing British punk fashion.

Proceedings were sombre; the models entered one by one, walked slowly up and down the small room, then exited. Polina Kasina, McQueen's longtime fit model, wore the final ensemble, the feathered coat. The shows closed with the whispered words "There is no more"; the models did not return for the traditional final walk.

== Reception ==
=== Contemporary ===
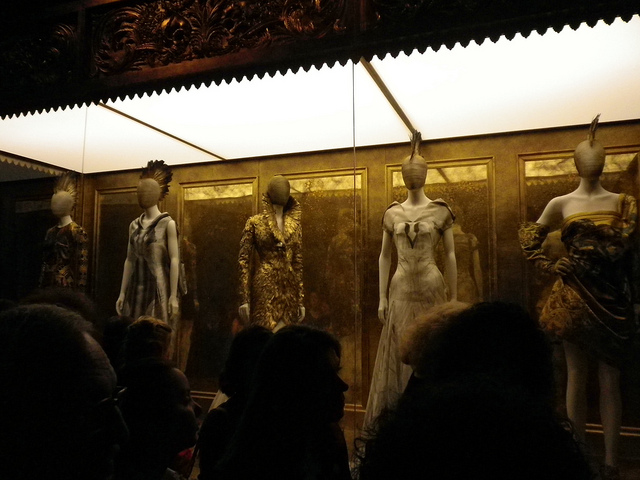
Several ensembles from Angels and Demons at Savage Beauty (2011)

In this collection Alexander – Lee – McQueen showed his sensitivity to history, his powers of research, his imagination, his technical skills and his love of women, often misinterpreted or misunderstood, but here evident in every fold and feather.

— Suzy Menkes, The International Herald Tribune, 9 March 2010

Critical reception for Angels and Demons was positive. It was generally felt that the runway shows had successfully juxtaposed the memorial atmosphere with the beauty of the clothing. Susannah Frankel congratulated McQueen's team for completing the collection in what she called a "perfectly judged tribute". In her review for The Guardian, Jess Cartner-Morley wrote that McQueen "came back to life" for the fifteen minutes the show lasted. Booth Moore, for the Los Angeles Times, wondered "how so much beauty came from so much pain". Guy Trebay of The New York Times called it "a wake without a corpse". Some regretted that the restrained presentation might not have been what McQueen would have chosen for the collection, although Sarah Mower of Vogue felt it allowed those who knew him a space to grieve. The staff reviewer at Women's Wear Daily wrote that it enabled a unique appreciation of the details.

Some critics described the collection as feeling religiously Gothic, like some of McQueen's earlier work. The focus on the afterlife was felt to be somewhat eerie under the circumstances, and many speculated on McQueen's mental state during the creation process. Several reviews noted the way the theme was infused into the collection through details such as ecclesiastical-seeming gold embroidery, stained glass jewellery, and angelic and feather motifs. The light grey chiffon column gowns were a favourite. Robin Givhan, fashion editor for The Washington Post, highlighted the final look, writing that the model "looked like an angel" protected by wings.

For many critics, the collection had a sense of calm that was not always present in McQueen's work. Mower felt that the ornateness of the clothing appeared at first to be a counter-narrative to the contemporary trend for minimalism, but that the clean silhouettes of the long dresses "suggested a calm and simplicity" in their own way. She wrote that the final outfit "encapsulated everything about McQueen: both the tailoring and the romanticism". Cathy Horyn of The New York Times was moved by "how personal and incredibly reassured the work was", and hoped that McQueen had been satisfied with his work. Hilary Alexander agreed that the collection demonstrated McQueen's romantic side with the grey chiffon gowns, but also felt his irreverent side was present in the dramatic embellished cloaks.

Others discussed the way the collection balanced historicism with modern techniques, many viewing it in light of its more technological predecessor, Plato's Atlantis. Suzy Menkes felt that Angels and Demons was a distillation of McQueen's work on that collection, highlighting the digital prints of paintings as exemplifying McQueen's "exceptional reach from historic past to cyberspace future". Some identified a sharp contrast between the two collections. Binkley considered it typical of McQueen to pivot sharply between ideas, and Cartner-Morley found it a "bittersweet" change. Horyn emphasised the hand-crafting in Angels and Demons as compared to the digital focus of Plato's Atlantis.

=== Retrospective ===
The collection is well-remembered in retrospect. Considering the collection several months after release, Hamish Bowles, also from Vogue, called it a "poignant coda to a career characterized by ceaseless invention, curiosity and lightning flashes of absolute brilliance". At McQueen's memorial service, Vogue's editor-in-chief Anna Wintour described the collection as "a battle between dark and light". Knox called it "a tour de force of the longevity of his talent". Fashion theorist Catherine Spooner considered the collection to be one of McQueen's Gothic collections. She labelled it "medieval Gothic Revivalism" in comparison to other collections that drew from "contemporary horror and even the comic Gothic of Harry Potter". Alexander McQueen archivist John Matheson described Angels and Demons as a "bookend" to McQueen's career, fusing ideas from his early years with contemporary innovations.

== Analysis ==
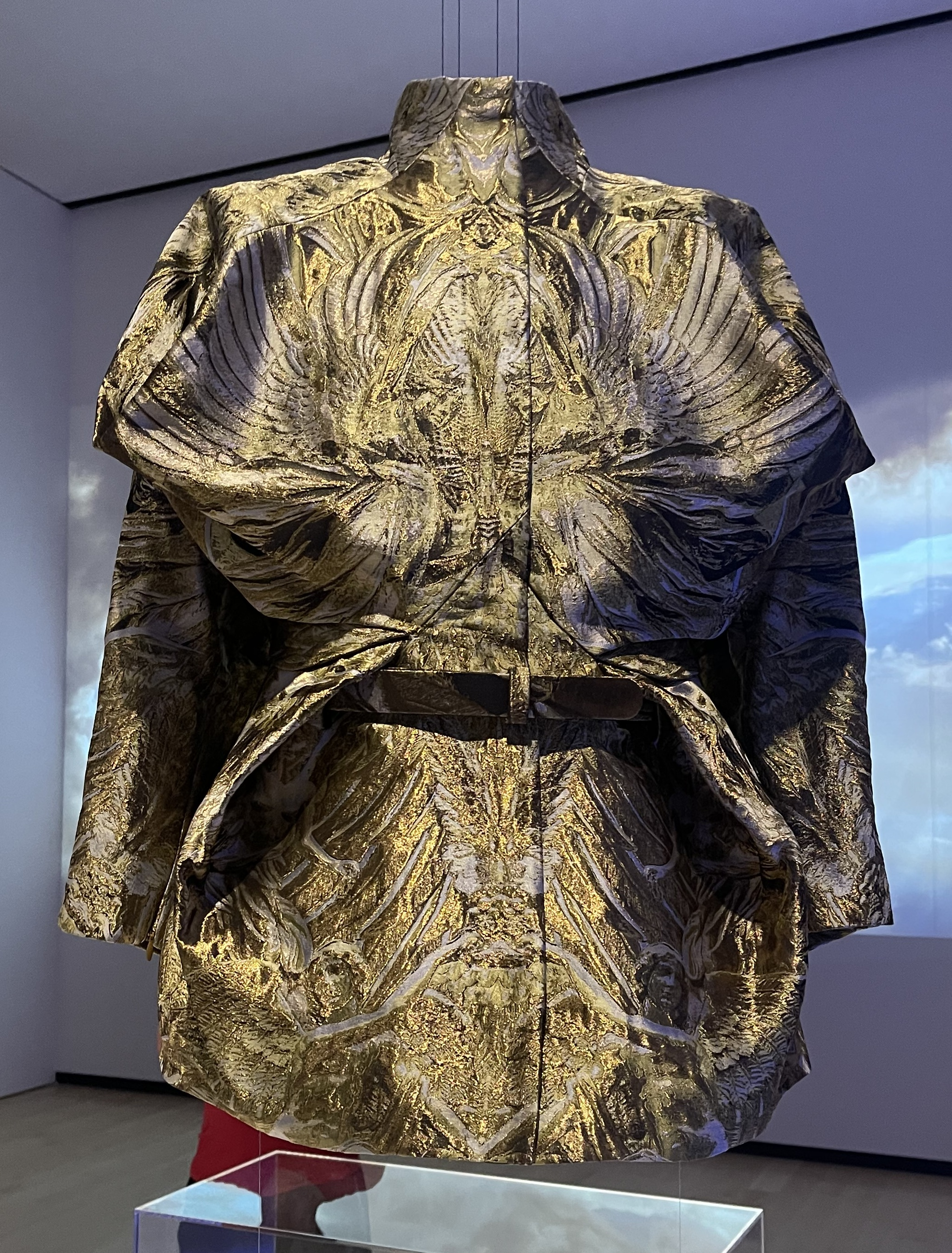
Top from Look 7, presented at Alexander McQueen: Mind, Mythos, Muse exhibition at Musée national des beaux-arts du Québec

Much of the critical examination of Angels and Demons focuses on interpreting the religious theme. It is often seen as a reflection of McQueen's precarious emotional state, or even as a hint at his impending suicide. Viewing the unfinished collection for the first time following McQueen's death, his close friend Sebastian Pons described it as "a requiem". Several contemporary reviews make statements along these lines. Author Chloe Fox wrote that it was an "other-worldly collection, as if McQueen had indeed had one eye on the afterlife". Textile curators Clarissa M. Esguerra and Michaela Hansen disagreed that the collection was intended to telegraph anything about McQueen's mental state or suicide, arguing that it was typical of McQueen to juxtapose dichotomous ideas and explore controversial themes such as religion. References to mortality and religion had been a major part of McQueen's work throughout his career.

Fashion theorist Nathalie Khan considered the way that Angels and Demons had helped McQueen's legacy transition "from fashion to mythology" in the popular imagination. She viewed the show's simplicity as its strength. Each model appearing one by one with no theatrical flourish placed the focus on the emotional impact of the designs. References to McQueen's previous work gave the collection a "momentous quality" that made it feel like a memorial to his career. For Khan, McQueen's death, and the posthumous presentation of Angels and Demons, signalled the end of an era in which a designer's personality was "central to the way fashion establishes meaning".

Philosopher Chris McWade picked up on Khan's analysis to argue that McQueen's entire legacy was defined by the spectral – what he called "an air of ghostliness". He described McQueen as metaphorically haunting Angels and Demons, contrasting it with his first collection, Jack the Ripper Stalks His Victims (1991), where McQueen's presence was more literal in the form of his hair sewn into the labels.

Juliana Luna Mora and Jess Berry considered McQueen's association with the spectral in a paper about how luxury fashion houses maintain continuity after the deaths of their founders. They saw Angels and Demons as an "example of the commodification of death and illusion of immortality", in which McQueen's suicide became part of the brand's mythology. Sarah Burton was named creative director at the Alexander McQueen brand following McQueen's death. In her Spring/Summer 2023 collection, she used digital prints and embroidery taken from The Garden of Earthly Delights, resurrecting the imagery used in Angels and Demons. In this way, for Mora and Berry, she was participating in the commodification of imagery associated with McQueen's death to perpetuate his fashion house.

== Legacy ==
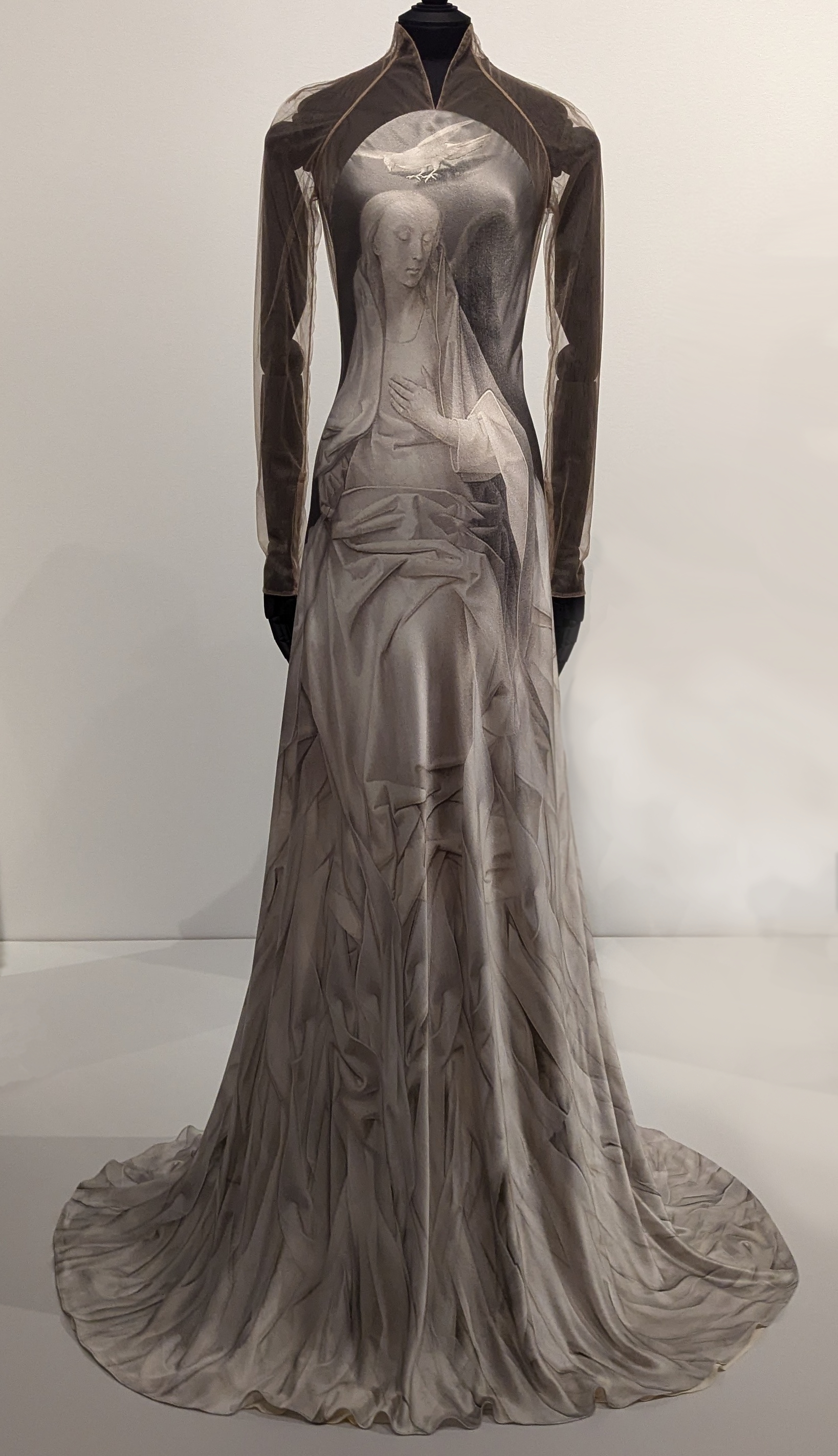
Grey evening gown from retail collection, printed with monochrome rendering of Mary, the mother of Jesus taken from the Portinari Altarpiece (c. 1475) by Hugo van der Goes

Tim Walker photographed Karlie Kloss wearing the final look for an editorial in the October 2010 issue of British Vogue. For the 2010 MTV Video Music Awards red carpet, singer Lady Gaga wore a custom McQueen dress in the style of Angels and Demons (although not one of the sixteen pieces presented on the runway).

The Metropolitan Museum of Art (the Met) in New York City owns three ensembles from Angels and Demons: Look 1, the red and gold bodice and skirt combination, and two other unspecified looks. The Victoria and Albert Museum in London owns copies of Look 2, with the Hieronymus Bosch print; Look 5, a gold minidress; and Look 11, a light grey gown. The National Gallery of Victoria owns the dress and boots from Look 3, the dress from Look 4, and a pair of boots from the retail collection. The Museum of Fine Arts, Boston owns a copy of Look 11.

Five outfits from Angels and Demons appeared in the exhibition Alexander McQueen: Savage Beauty: Look 2, the dress with the Bosch prints; Look 5 with matching glove and shoes; Look 10 with shoes; Look 11; and the final look, the gold feathered coat with white underskirt. In the 2011 staging of the exhibition at the Met, they were presented behind glass in the show's first room, the Cabinet of Curiosities. Nathalie Khan felt that this transformed the items from a commercial product to a symbolic one. Three items appeared in the Met's 2018 exhibition Heavenly Bodies: Fashion and the Catholic Imagination: Look 2, Look 5, and Look 11. Three items from Angels and Demons appeared in the 2022 exhibition Lee Alexander McQueen: Mythos, Mind, Muse: the top from Look 7, a retail version of the dress from Look 2, and a pair of shoes. They were placed in the Mythos section of the show, which covered the McQueen shows inspired by religion and mythology.

Fashion collector Jennifer Zuiker auctioned her McQueen collection in 2020, including two pieces from the retail collection of Angels and Demons. A dress printed with archangels adapted from Look 10 sold for a reported $3,750, and a gold minidress adapted from Look 5 sold for a reported $4,688.

== Bibliography ==
- Bolton, Andrew (2011). Alexander McQueen: Savage Beauty. New York City: Metropolitan Museum of Art. ISBN 978-1-58839-412-5. OCLC 687693871.
- Bolton, Andrew (2018). "III. Fashioning Devotion". Heavenly Bodies: Fashion and the Catholic Imagination. Vol. II. New York City: Metropolitan Museum of Art. ISBN 978-1-58839-645-7. OCLC 1011626301.
- Braddock Clarke, Sarah E. (2022). Braddock Clarke, Sarah E.; Kondo, Ryoko Yamanaka (eds.). Byzantine Silk on the Silk Roads: Journeys between East and West, Past and Present. London: Bloomsbury Visual Arts. ISBN 978-1-350-09931-9. OCLC 1236898275.
- Esguerra, Clarissa M.; Hansen, Michaela (2022). Lee Alexander McQueen: Mind, Mythos, Muse. New York City: Delmonico Books. ISBN 978-1-63681-018-8. OCLC 1289986708.
- Fairer, Robert; Wilcox, Claire (2016). Alexander McQueen: Unseen. New Haven, Connecticut: Yale University Press. ISBN 978-0-300-22267-8. OCLC 946216643.
- Fox, Chloe (2012). Vogue On: Alexander McQueen. Vogue on Designers. London: Quadrille Publishing. ISBN 978-1-84949-113-6. OCLC 828766756.
- Gleason, Katherine (2012). Alexander McQueen: Evolution. New York City: Race Point Publishing. ISBN 978-1-61058-837-9. OCLC 783147416.
- Khan, Nathalie (2013). "Fashion as Mythology: Considering the Legacy of Alexander McQueen". In Bruzzi, Stella; Gibson, Pamela Church (eds.). Fashion Cultures Revisited. London: Routledge. pp. 261–271. ISBN 978-0-415-68005-9. OCLC 850909311.
- Kiilerich, Bente (2024). "Gender and Fashion". In Meyer, Mati; Messis, Charis (eds.). The Routledge Handbook of Gender and Sexuality in Byzantium. The Routledge History Handbooks. London: Routledge. ISBN 978-1-040-04345-5. OCLC 1426294498.
- Knox, Kristin (2010). Alexander McQueen: Genius of a Generation. London: A&C Black. ISBN 978-1-4081-3223-4. OCLC 794296806.
- Mora, Juliana Luna; Berry, Jess (September 2022). "Creative Direction Succession in Luxury Fashion: The Illusion of Immortality at Chanel and Alexander McQueen". Luxury. 9 (2–3): 117–140. doi:10.1080/20511817.2022.2194039. ISSN 2051-1817.
- O'Flaherty, Mark C. (2023). "John Matheson". Narrative Thread: Conversations on Fashion Collections. London: Bloomsbury Visual Arts. pp. 66–85. ISBN 978-1-350-28767-9. OCLC 1390968145.
- Thomas, Dana (2015). Gods and Kings: The Rise and Fall of Alexander McQueen and John Galliano. New York City: Penguin Publishing. ISBN 978-1-101-61795-3. OCLC 951153602.
- Watt, Judith (2012). Alexander McQueen: The Life and the Legacy. New York City: Harper Design. ISBN 978-1-84796-085-6. OCLC 892706946.
- McWade, Chris (January 2021). "From Rat to Wraith: Spectral Transgression Against Masculine Tropes in Alexander McQueen's Eclect Dissect (A/W for Givenchy 1997–1998)". Fashion Theory. 25 (1): 77. doi:10.1080/1362704X.2019.1598203. ISSN 1362-704X. S2CID 194663301. Archived from the original on 22 May 2023 – via Taylor & Francis.
- Wilcox, Claire, ed. (2015). Alexander McQueen. New York City: Abrams Books. ISBN 978-1-4197-1723-9. OCLC 891618596.
  - Bethune, Kate. "Encyclopedia of Collections". In Wilcox (2015), pp. 303–326.
  - Kennedy, Kirstin. "Layers of Meaning". In Wilcox (2015), pp. 165–169.
  - Spooner, Catherine. "A Gothic Mind". In Wilcox (2015), pp. 141–158.
- Wilson, Andrew (2015). Alexander McQueen: Blood Beneath the Skin. New York City: Simon and Schuster. ISBN 978-1-4767-7674-3. OCLC 1310585849.
