= Angels and Demons (disambiguation) =

Angels & Demons is a mystery-thriller novel by Dan Brown released in 2000.

Angels & Demons or Angels and Demons may also refer to:

== Media ==
- Angels & Demons (film), the 2009 adaptation of the Dan Brown novel
- "Angels and Demons" (Blade: The Series), episode 1.09 of Blade: The Series in 2006
- "Angels & Demons", title of 8th episode of the TV series Agent X in 2015

== Music ==
- Angels & Demons (album), by Peter Andre, released 2012
- "Angels & Demons", a song by Tamar Braxton from the 2015 album Calling All Lovers
- Angels & Demons, a joint musical project by Chris Brown and Joyner Lucas
- "Angels & Demons", a song by Jxdn from Tell Me About Tomorrow
- "Angels and Demons", a song by Angra from Temple of Shadows

== Other ==
- Angels and Demons (collection), a 2010 fashion collection by Alexander McQueen

== See also ==
- Angels and Demons at Play, 1965 jazz album by Sun Ra and his Myth Science Arkestra recorded in 1956 and 1960
- Demons and Angels (disambiguation)
- Angels and Devils (disambiguation)
- Angel
- Demon
- Fallen angel
