= Stephanie Theobald =

British novelist and broadcaster

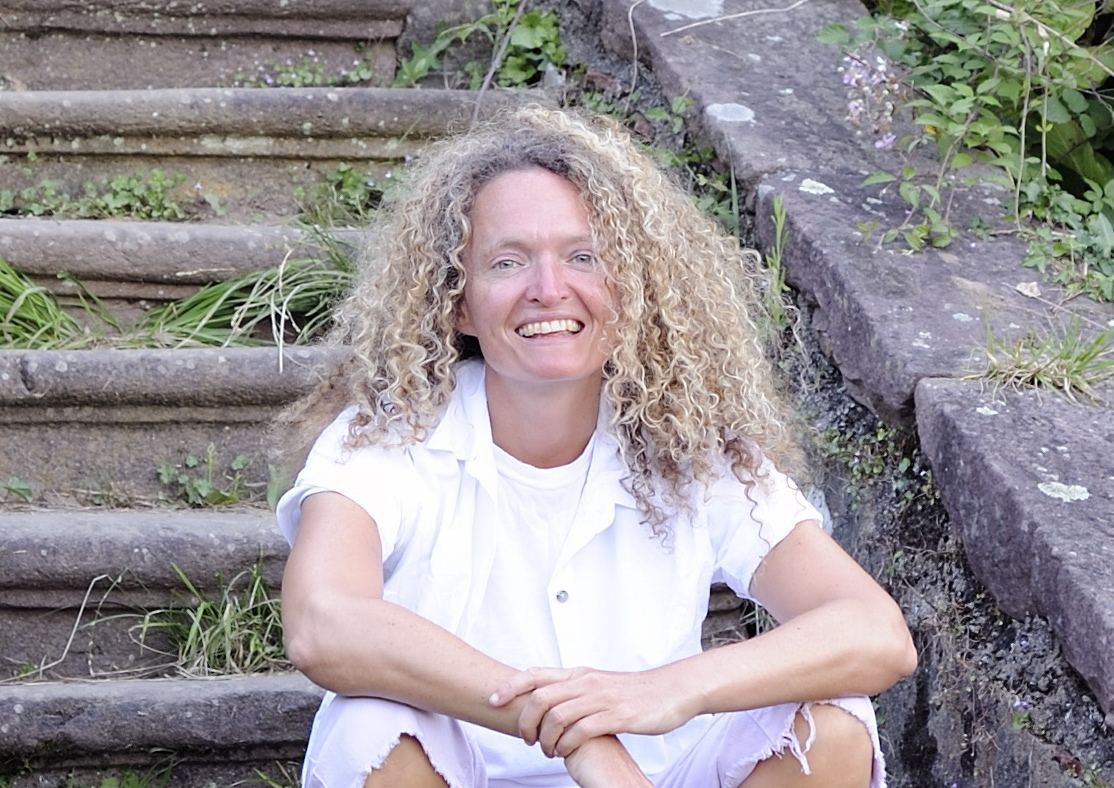
Stephanie Theobald

Stephanie Theobald (born 29 August 1966) is a British novelist and broadcaster, author of Biche and three other novels. The Times described her as “One of London’s most celebrated literary lesbians.” In a Varsity 2011 interview with Theobald, the paper described her as “No ordinary female writer.”

== Background ==
Theobald was born in Ipswich, Suffolk in 1966. She was educated at Tremough Convent, Cornwall, (now home to Falmouth University) Penryn from 1971 until 1983, then the Plume School in Maldon from 1983 to 1985. She attended Jesus College, Cambridge from 1985 to 1989, reading the Modern and Medieval languages tripos. Theobald's grandfather, Bertram Jesse Theobald, a tool turner, founded a fish-and-chip business in 1943 in Spring Road, Ipswich after he escaped France in one of the Dunkirk small boats and was seconded out of the army to make weapons. Theobald has described how Winston Churchill had announced that fish and chips would not be rationed and Bertram's wife, Iris believed there would be money to make from the business. When Theobald's father, Roy Theobald, came out of National Service in Malaysia in 1960 he joined the family business, which now included four shops in the Ipswich area. In 1969, Roy bought a fish-and-chip business in Arwenack Street in Falmouth, Cornwall and the family – his wife Veronica and their three children, Christopher (born 1965) and twins Stephanie and Nicholas – moved there.

== Works ==
In 1999, Theobald published an essay called "Lesbians on Horseback" in the feminist collection On The Move (Virago) edited by Natasha Walter. In 2000 her first novel, Biche, was published by Hodder and Stoughton, describing her life in Paris. Julie Burchill, quoted on the cover, described it as "Sexy without being 'erotic', funky without being 'feisty', funny without being 'zany' and rebellious without being 'irreverent.'” Zoe Williams in the London Evening Standard described it as ‘Among the most genuinely evocative and amusing naughty stuff I've ever read . . . . A witty, mucky, authentic book, which puts a new and most-welcome spin on this Looking-For-The-One genre’. In 2001, Sucking Shrimp was published by Hodder and Stoughton. The Face said “As vivid as a Baz Luhrmann movie”. She followed this in the same year with "The Masturbation Map" in Girls’ Night Out (HarperCollins) edited by Jessica Adams, Chris Manby and Fiona Walker. Her next novel Trix was published in 2004 by Sceptre. “An effortless, natural poet.” according to The Guardian. In 2009, she published A Partial Indulgence by Sceptre. The book was given a favorable review in The Times: “Art, sex, money, class - this novel delivers them all, with enormous style.”

Her latest work, Sex Drive: On the Road to A Pleasure Revolution, published in October 2018, is about her road trip across the USA using self-pleasure to find her lost libido. It has been described by the Sunday Times as, “frank and funny.” BBC Arts described it as "Part Jack Kerouac, part Joan Didion.”

As a journalist, she writes for a wide variety of publications.

== Criticism ==
Theobald has been the subject of controversy – punk designer Vivienne Westwood was vociferously hostile to her work. At a London society party in 2009 she approached her to announce that she ‘hated’ Theobald's novels adding that A Partial Indulgence was “Like vomit coming at you off the page.”

== Personal life ==
While Theobald worked as the social editor of UK Harper's Bazaar (2004–2008), she was linked with the flamboyant fashion editor Isabella Blow when she briefly dated her estranged husband, Detmar Blow. The story and atmosphere of that time was played out in Theobald's fourth novel, A Partial Indulgence.
