= Jack the Ripper Stalks His Victims =

1992 Alexander McQueen fashion collection

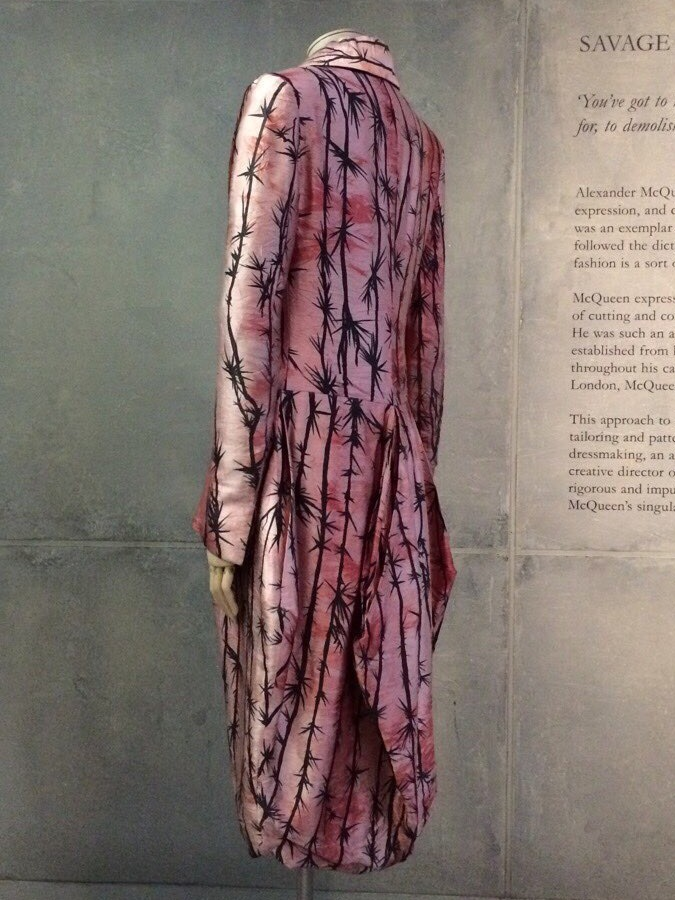
Pink frock coat with thorn print from Jack the Ripper at Alexander McQueen: Savage Beauty (Victoria and Albert Museum, 2011)

Jack the Ripper Stalks His Victims is the first collection by British designer Alexander McQueen, produced as the thesis collection for his master's degree in fashion at Central Saint Martins (CSM) art school.

The collection's narrative was inspired by the victims of 19th-century London serial killer Jack the Ripper, with aesthetic inspiration from the fashion, erotica, and prostitution practices of the Victorian era. The collection was presented on the runway at London Fashion Week on 16 March 1992, as the second-to-last of the CSM graduate collections. Editor Isabella Blow was fascinated by the runway show and insisted on purchasing the entire collection, later becoming McQueen's friend and muse.

Jack the Ripper remains an object of critical analysis for its violent concept and styling. McQueen held on to the narrative and aesthetic tendencies he established in Jack the Ripper throughout his career, earning a reputation for producing narratively-driven collections inspired by macabre aspects of history, art, and his own life. Items from Jack the Ripper, including a pink frock coat with a thorn print, have appeared in the retrospectives Alexander McQueen: Savage Beauty (2011 and 2015) and Isabella Blow: Fashion Galore! (2013).

== Background ==
British designer Alexander McQueen (born Lee Alexander McQueen; 1969–2010) was known in the fashion industry for his imaginative, sometimes controversial, designs and dramatic fashion shows. Over the course of his career, which lasted from 1992 until his death in 2010, he explored a broad range of ideas and themes, particularly sexuality, death, violence, romanticism, and historicism. He was fascinated with many of these topics from childhood. McQueen's work was highly autobiographical: he incorporated elements of his memories, feelings, and family history into his designs and runway shows. In his early career, McQueen was often accused of misogyny for his extreme designs, a characterisation to which he consistently objected.

The son of a London taxicab driver and a teacher, McQueen grew up in one of the poorer neighbourhoods in London's East End. His upbringing was traumatic: he was a victim of childhood sexual abuse and witnessed his sisters experiencing domestic violence from their partners. He began his career in fashion in 1984 as an apprentice with Savile Row tailors Anderson & Sheppard before briefly joining Gieves & Hawkes as a pattern cutter. His work on Savile Row earned him a reputation as an expert tailor. McQueen left Savile Row in 1988, and spent the next two years in various entry-level positions in fashion. He worked briefly for the theatrical costumiers Angels and Bermans. In 1989, at the age of 20, he was hired by experimental Mayfair-based designer Koji Tatsuno. He next worked under designer John McKitterick, gaining experience with fetishwear; first at Red or Dead, then at McKitterick's own label.

McQueen sought further experience in the industry, and McKitterick recommended he try for an apprenticeship in Italy, then the centre of the fashion world. From March to July 1990, McQueen worked in Milan at the atelier of designer Romeo Gigli. After resigning, he returned to McKitterick's label in London by August. When McQueen expressed interest in learning more about the fashion industry, McKitterick suggested he see Bobby Hillson, the founder and head of the master's course in fashion at London art school Central Saint Martins (CSM).

== Central Saint Martins ==
McQueen turned up at CSM with a pile of sample clothing and no appointment, seeking a job teaching pattern cutting. Hillson considered him too young for this, but based on the strength of his portfolio – and despite his lack of formal qualifications – accepted McQueen into the eighteen-month master's-level fashion design course. Unable to afford the tuition, he borrowed £4000 from his aunt Renee to cover it. McQueen met a number of his future collaborators at CSM, including Simon Ungless, a friend and later roommate.

CSM students at the master's level were expected to produce a graduation collection of at least six outfits as their thesis. McQueen told Hillson that he intended to present clothing that was distressed and stained, so the models would look like survivors of a violent attack. Although Hillson was dubious about the idea, she agreed to mentor him. Among other things, this meant quietly providing him with quality fabric from the CSM stores. He could not afford to buy his own, and lower-quality fabric would not have withstood the level of distressing McQueen was applying.

Students were required to provide a marketing report with their collections, outlining the rationale and business case for their designs. McQueen instead presented a narrative which described how his mother's study of genealogy led him to discover that a distant relative of his had owned an inn and rented a room to one of Jack the Ripper's victims, although his professors doubted the story. (Note: Some sources incorrectly write that McQueen claimed to have been distantly related to the actual victim.) CSM professor Louise Wilson, with whom McQueen had a contentious relationship, told author Andrew Wilson that the cover of the report was decorated with McQueen's pubic hair. The report was, at some point, stolen from Wilson's office; she suspected that McQueen himself was responsible.

McQueen was not being shocking just to indulge himself. CSM's graduation shows were covered by the London press, and he wanted to exploit controversy to create publicity. This was a common tactic for London's young designers at the time. The country's fashion industry lacked infrastructure to support newcomers, forcing them to rely on extreme showmanship to draw media attention in the hopes of attracting financial backers.

== Concept and collection ==
The collection's narrative was inspired by the victims of 19th-century London serial killer Jack the Ripper, for whom it was titled. The show notes described Jack the Ripper as a "Day into eveningwear collection inspired by 19th century street walkers". McQueen took aesthetic inspiration for the garments from the fashion, erotica, and prostitution practices of the Victorian era. His tight tailoring and sculptural elements echoed the Victorian style of shaping the body with corsets and bustles. McQueen and Ungless had a mutual interest in the famous 18th-century sadomasochistic novel The 120 Days of Sodom and the 1975 film adaptation Salò, or the 120 Days of Sodom, which played into the collection's brutal aesthetic. McQueen also drew on the 1985 novel Perfume, in which a genius perfumer becomes a serial murderer of young women.

McQueen also found inspiration in the work of other designers. McKitterick recalled him being "obsessed" with fellow British designer John Galliano, whose work was known for being creative and theatrical. Ungless disputes this to an extent, stating that McQueen disliked Galliano's designs, but wanted to outdo his achievements. To a lesser extent, McQueen looked to Helmut Lang and Martin Margiela, who were then experimenting with a minimalist style that was avant-garde when compared to the maximalist styles of the 1980s. He was also interested in the decadence and sexuality of Yves Saint Laurent.

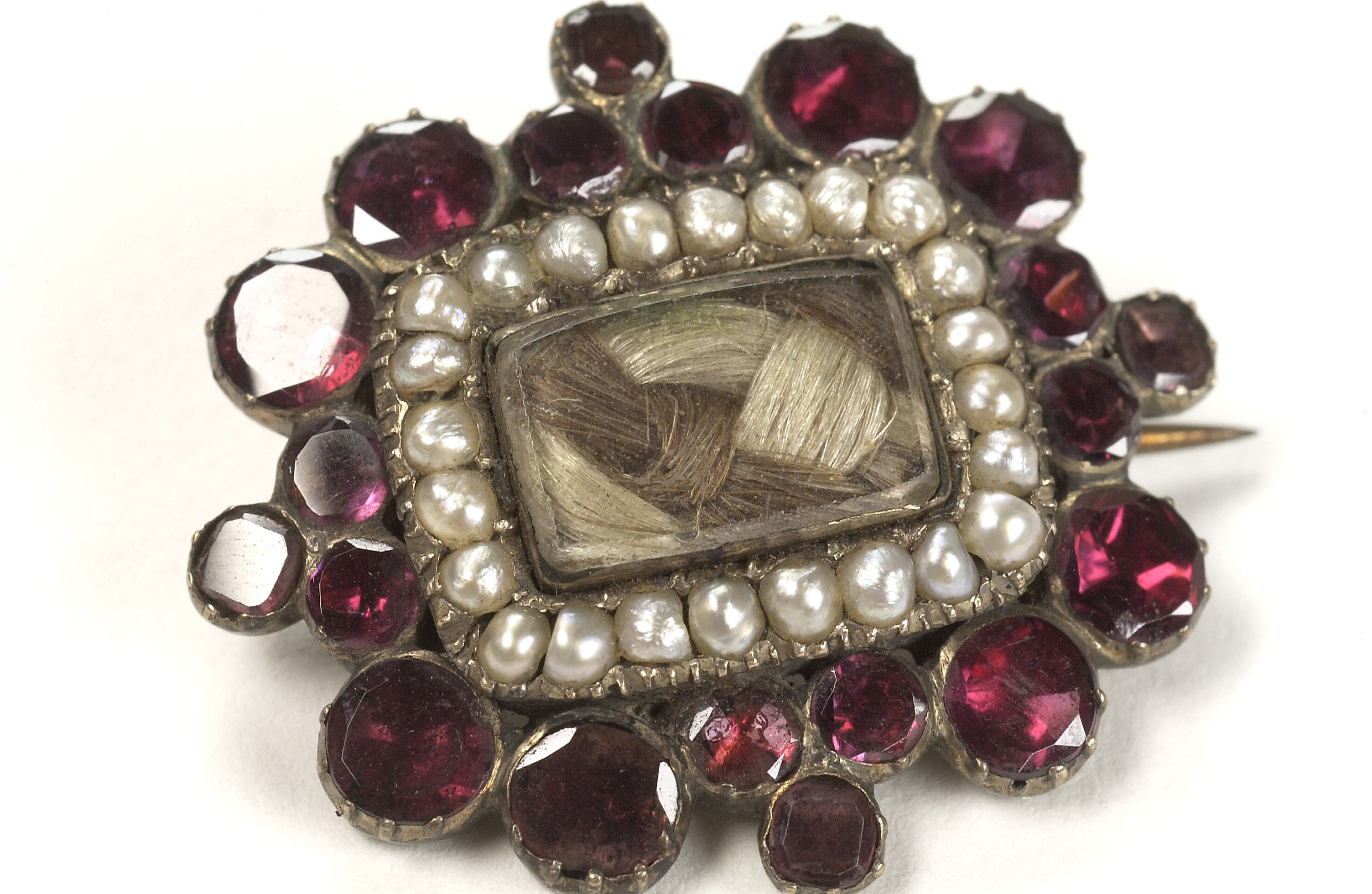
Victorian mourning brooch containing the hair of a deceased relative

McQueen translated what he had learned from his various jobs directly into the collection: tailoring from Savile Row, complexity from Tatsuno, fetishwear from Red or Dead, and a decadent aesthetic from Gigli. He combined historicist references to older styles such as frock coats with modern elements like asymmetrical pleating or twisted fabric, and played rich colours against transparent fabrics. The collection's palette was primarily black and deep red, with mauve and red fabric used for lining. Mauve is a Victorian mourning colour, while using red for lining may have been an echo of the appearance of human flesh within the body. Blood splatter was represented by red beads, yarn, and paint. The garments were distressed with burn marks and other damage. Some skirts were decorated with bricolage of photos from magazines, including a portrait of actor Johnny Depp. Feathers, gathered from Ungless's country home, were used as trim.

Several garments, including a pink frock coat, were lined with fabric which had human hair encapsulated within. For the clothing tag on the items, he encased locks of hair (claimed to be his own) inside of clear plastic squares. The use of human hair referenced several historical practices: keeping a lock of hair as a memento or trophy, the Victorian-era practice of prostitutes selling their hair, and the Victorian use of hair jewellery for mourning.

== Runway show and discovery ==
=== Runway show ===
At the time, CSM presented its graduation collections in a single show at London Fashion Week. That year, it was held at the Duke of York's Headquarters, London, on 16 March 1992; (Note: Some sources provide a date of July 1992 and list the venue as the Olympia London in Kensington. It is unclear where this originated from, but it appears to be erroneous, as London Fashion Week in 1992 was held in March, and Central Saint Martins holds its graduation shows at Fashion Week.) the day before McQueen's twenty-third birthday. Jack the Ripper was presented in the CSM show's second-to-last slot. The show was photographed by Niall McInerney. McQueen's mother Joyce and his aunt Renee attended the runway show. A few other attendees would have a significant impact on McQueen's career. Magazine editor and stylist Isabella Blow immediately found herself fascinated by McQueen's work. Jeweller Shaun Leane was invited to the CSM show by chance; he and McQueen later became friends and formed a long-standing artistic collaboration.

London artist Simon Costin loaned McQueen jewellery for the show, including his 1986 piece Memento Mori, made from bird claws, rabbit skulls, and synthetic jet stones. Other Costin pieces included a piece made with lacquered dried fish, another with dried baby iguanas and thrushes' wings, and a collar necklace made of preserved bird claws.

Students were expected to present a minimum of six outfits for a graduation collection; McQueen presented ten. The first outfit featured a black beaded bandeau with an asymmetrical cut, paired with dark red skintight trousers. The second was a shift in sheer black chiffon worn over a black bra and a black chiffon pencil skirt with feather trim, accessorised with a bird claw necklace by Costin. Next came a black satin frock coat with long pointed front panels and nothing underneath, worn over a photo collage hoop skirt; a tailored black jacket worn over a patchwork skirt; a red and black tunic dress over torn tights; a tailored pink silk frock coat with a print of black thorns designed by Ungless, over a black bra and black satin trousers; a black tailcoat with red lining, with nothing underneath, worn over black satin trousers trimmed with red beads; a sheer black open-back sleeveless top with tight black trousers, all trimmed with feathers; a black coat with a wasp waist and sharply jutting peplum, worn with a deep red beaded pencil skirt; and finally a sleeveless blouse in sheer dark red with black beaded epaulettes and high-waisted black satin trousers.

=== Discovery by Isabella Blow ===
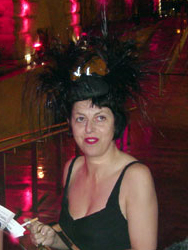
Isabella Blow in 2005

Isabella Blow insisted on purchasing the collection; McQueen later recalled her as "this nutty lady" who "wouldn't stop badgering me" about it. Despite her aristocratic heritage, Blow lived in genteel poverty, and was forced to pay McQueen in cash instalments. Blow described the arrangement in a 2005 interview: "He'd bring an outfit in a bin liner, I'd look at it and then he'd come to the cash-point with me."

How much of the collection Blow purchased and what she paid for what she bought are in dispute. Most sources say she purchased the entire collection. In her 2015 book Gods and Kings, journalist Dana Thomas reported that Simon Ungless told her, "with authority", that it was not the entire collection, although Thomas did not elaborate on how many items Ungless said Blow bought, or which ones. In a 2015 interview, Susannah Frankel also stated that it was not the entire collection.

Author Katherine Knox reports that Blow paid approximately £400 per item, but does not say how many garments she bought. In her biography of McQueen, Judith Watt writes that Blow paid £450 for a single jacket and then £5000 in monthly instalments for the entire collection. Journalists Maureen Callahan and Dana Thomas both criticise the figure of £5000 as an unrealistic one for a brand-new designer at that time, but disagree on who was responsible for the myth: Callahan points at McQueen, while Thomas reports that it was Blow who liked to exaggerate what she paid. Callahan gives the real price for the whole collection as £350. Thomas reports that McQueen charged Blow £450, but is ambiguous as to whether this is for a single jacket or the entire collection. McQueen and Blow themselves disagreed on the figure; in interviews for a 1997 BBC Two programme, they gave differing accounts. McQueen said he was desperate for money and demanded £350, "take it or leave it", while Blow said "actually it wasn't £350 the lot, it was £350 per piece".

Following the purchase, Blow took it upon herself to promote McQueen's work, becoming a combination of mentor and muse for the early part of McQueen's career. She wore his clothing around London and used it for photoshoots. When British Vogue produced a six-page spread about Blow's country house in November 1992, Blow and her husband were photographed in McQueen's clothing, including the pink thorn-print frock coat.

== Reception and analysis ==
In retrospect, those who viewed the show recall the collection as being strong, but not necessarily groundbreaking. Hillson felt that McQueen would have done better in a two-year programme to give him more time to come into himself as a designer. Jane Rapley, then the head of CSM, found Jack the Ripper interesting but thought "it wasn't heart-stopping". Designer John McKitterick, who saw the clothing before the show, thought it was a solid collection. Rapley believed it was Blow's attention that allowed McQueen to succeed at that time, as it provided him networking opportunities. Louise Rytter notes that the show received minimal press attention, but Blow recognised it as something unique regardless. Fashion journalist Susannah Frankel recalled contemporary press attention mostly focusing on the clothing designs, saying that criticism of the violent imagery did not emerge until later "because the press were looking for something to say later on".

Most critical response has focused on the collection's unusual, violent narrative and styling. Some have connected the themes of sexuality and violence to McQueen's traumatic childhood. Author Ana Finel Honigman wrote that McQueen was "transcending but also retaining a history of horror" with his references to the past. In her view, the thorn-print frock coat depicted a "murder victim's hair floating in her own blood". Fashion theorist Caroline Evans cited Jack the Ripper as an early example of McQueen's incorporation of "sex, death, and commerce" into fashion, and connected it to his Autumn/Winter 1996 collection Dante, which had similar themes. Judith Watt found a similarity between Jack the Ripper and the work of British designer John Galliano, whose 1984 degree collection from CSM had drawn on the violence of the French First Republic (1792–1804). Fashion theorist Christopher Breward wrote that McQueen's decision to reference Jack the Ripper could be seen as unoriginal, given the killer's persistent influence on popular culture, but concludes this would be an oversimplification. Theorist Mélissa Diaby Savané described McQueen's overall aesthetic as a "fantasy of ugliness", and noted that to this end, McQueen did not romanticise or beautify the prostitutes he was inspired by, instead presenting them "in all their vulgarity".

McQueen's use of his own hair has also drawn critical analysis. Evans wrote that McQueen conceived of his use of his own hair as his way of "giving himself to the collection". Academic Chris McWade wrote that it took "the idea of investing oneself into one's work to a literal end", serving as a means for McQueen to live on through his work both metaphorically and in a lesser sense literally. Writer Cassandra Atherton described using several McQueen collections, including Jack the Ripper, in a university-level creative writing course to teach a connection between poetry and fashion, particularly how one can inspire the other. She noted that many of the students became fascinated with McQueen's use of hair and the history of hair in clothing and jewellery.

== Legacy ==
What attracted me to Alexander was the way he takes ideas from the past and sabotages them with his cut to make them thoroughly new and in the context of today. It is the complexity and severity of his approach to cut that makes him so modern. He is like a Peeping Tom in the way he slits and stabs at fabric to explore all the erogenous zones of the body.

— Isabella Blow, quoted in Harper's Bazaar, 1996

Jack the Ripper was the only collection McQueen presented under his birth name, Lee A. McQueen. By the time he released his next collection, Taxi Driver (Autumn/Winter 1993), he had decided to design under his middle name, Alexander McQueen, which also became the name of his fashion house.

McQueen held on to the narrative and aesthetic tendencies he established in Jack the Ripper throughout his career, earning a reputation for producing narratively-driven collections inspired by macabre aspects of history, art, and his own life. Tight tailoring and unusual cuts became a brand standard, as did frock coats. Frankel called out "the big shoulder, the dropped waist line, and the exposed midriff" seen in the collection's runway show as an early-career signature silhouette. The so-called three-point "origami" folded tail on the thorn-print coat appeared in later collections. He drew on the novel Perfume again for Highland Rape (Autumn/Winter 1995).

At times, his references to Jack the Ripper were more direct. The Hunger (Spring/Summer 1996) pointed back at Jack the Ripper through design elements like sharply-pointed collars, smears of blood, trimmings that imitated human flesh, and prints of thorns. Hair jewellery appeared again in Sarabande (Spring/Summer 2007).

Two of the frock coats, including the thorn-print frock, appeared at the retrospective exhibition Alexander McQueen: Savage Beauty (staged in New York City in 2011 and in London in 2015, respectively). They were loaned by socialite Daphne Guinness, who purchased Blow's entire collection after her death in 2007. Items from the Blow archive, including the thorn-print coat and other items from Jack the Ripper, appeared in the 2013 retrospective Isabella Blow: Fashion Galore! at Somerset House in London. During the staging process for this exhibition, the thorn-print coat was discovered to have a cigarette burn in its side. The curators opted not to remove it during the textile restoration process, as they felt the burn "was a portal into exploring how Blow wore her remarkable wardrobe with such apparent disregard".

The thorn-print frock coat was photographed for a McQueen retrospective that appeared in the Spring/Summer 2015 issue of AnOther. It was styled with a pair of bumster trousers and the crown of thorns headpiece from Dante. When early McQueen employee Ruti Danan auctioned her personal archive in 2020, a pattern for one of the coats from Jack the Ripper sold for a reported US$3,025.

In 2016, CSM student Tina Gorjanc presented her master's thesis project, Pure Human, which proposed to use McQueen's DNA, sourced from the hair used in Jack the Ripper garments, to grow skin tissue that would be made into leather goods. Gorjanc's project was strictly theoretical. Although she applied for a patent for the process which mentions McQueen's name, she never obtained his actual DNA, and all three prototypes she produced were made of pig skin. McWade describes this project as part of the "ghostly quality" that defines McQueen's posthumous legacy, in which he is often viewed as a haunting presence or is metaphorically resurrected.

== Bibliography ==
- Atherton, Cassandra (2012). "The Haunting: Poetry and Fashion in the Creative Writing Workshop". Writing on the Edge. 23 (1): 47–53. ISSN 1064-6051. JSTOR 43157472.
- Bolton, Andrew (2011). Alexander McQueen: Savage Beauty. New York City: Metropolitan Museum of Art. ISBN 978-1-58839-412-5. Archived from the original on 9 July 2023.
  - Frankel, Susannah. Introduction. In Bolton (2011), pp. 17–27.
- Callahan, Maureen (2014). Champagne Supernovas: Kate Moss, Marc Jacobs, Alexander McQueen, and the '90s Renegades Who Remade Fashion. New York City: Touchstone Books. ISBN 978-1-4516-4053-3.
- Elenowitz-Hess, Caroline (16 April 2022). "Reckoning with Highland Rape: Sexuality, Violence, and Power on the Runway". Fashion Theory. 26 (3): 403. doi:10.1080/1362704X.2020.1846325. ISSN 1362-704X. S2CID 229432510.
- Evans, Caroline (2003). Fashion at the Edge: Spectacle, Modernity and Deathliness. New Haven, Connecticut: Yale University Press. ISBN 978-0-300-10192-8. Archived from the original on 31 May 2023.
- Fairer, Robert; Wilcox, Claire (2016). Alexander McQueen: Unseen. New Haven, Connecticut: Yale University Press. ISBN 978-0-300-22267-8. OCLC 946216643.
- Gleason, Katherine (2012). Alexander McQueen: Evolution. New York City: Race Point Publishing. ISBN 978-1-61058-837-9. Archived from the original on 19 January 2023.
- Honigman, Ana Finel (2021). What Alexander McQueen Can Teach You About Fashion. London: Frances Lincoln. ISBN 978-0-7112-5906-5.
- Knight, Nick (21 May 2015). Alexander McQueen: Susannah Frankel/Nick Knight Interview: Thorn Coat, Graduation Collection 1992. Susannah Frankel, interviewee. Showstudio. Archived from the original on 23 October 2023.
- Knox, Kristin (2010). Alexander McQueen: Genius of a Generation. London: A&C Black. ISBN 978-1-4081-3223-4. OCLC 794296806. Archived from the original on 15 October 2023.
- McWade, Chris (January 2021). "From Rat to Wraith: Spectral Transgression Against Masculine Tropes in Alexander McQueen's Eclect Dissect (A/W for Givenchy 1997–1998)". Fashion Theory. 25 (1): 77. doi:10.1080/1362704X.2019.1598203. ISSN 1362-704X. S2CID 194663301. Archived from the original on 22 May 2023 – via Taylor & Francis.
- Mora, Juliana Luna; Berry, Jess (2 September 2022). "Creative Direction Succession in Luxury Fashion: The Illusion of Immortality at Chanel and Alexander McQueen". Luxury. 9 (2–3): 117–140. doi:10.1080/20511817.2022.2194039. ISSN 2051-1817.
- O'Neill, Alistair (2018). "Staging Fashion in Somerset House, London". In Vänskä, Annamari; Clark, Hazel (eds.). Fashion Curating: Critical Practice in the Museum and Beyond. London: Bloomsbury Academic. pp. 105–118. ISBN 978-1-4742-8711-1.
- Savané, Mélissa Diaby (20 June 2021). "The fantasy of ugliness in Alexander McQueen collections (1992–2009): How did literature and the visual arts inspire Alexander McQueen to merge sex and horror in his own art form?". Revista 2i: Estudos de Identidade e Intermedialidade. 3 (3): 95–108. doi:10.21814/2i.3157. ISSN 2184-7010. Archived from the original on 23 October 2023.
- Thomas, Dana (2015). Gods and Kings: The Rise and Fall of Alexander McQueen and John Galliano. New York City: Penguin Publishing. ISBN 978-1-101-61795-3.
- Watt, Judith (2012). Alexander McQueen: The Life and the Legacy. New York City: Harper Design. ISBN 978-1-84796-085-6. OCLC 892706946.
- Wilcox, Claire, ed. (2015). Alexander McQueen. New York City: Abrams Books. ISBN 978-1-4197-1723-9. OCLC 891618596.
  - Bethune, Kate. "Encyclopedia of Collections". In Wilcox (2015), pp. 303–326.
  - Breward, Christopher. "Su[i]ture: Tailoring & The Fashion Metropolis". In Wilcox (2015), pp. 37–50.
  - Frankel, Susannah. "The Early Years". In Wilcox (2015), pp. 69–79.
  - O'Neill, Alistair. "The Shining and Chic". In Wilcox (2015), pp. 261–280.
  - Rytter, Louise. "Central Saint Martins". In Wilcox (2015), pp. 56–59.
  - Townsend, Eleanor. "Memento Mori". In Wilcox (2015), pp. 159–163.
  - Wilcox, Claire. "Edward Scissorhands". In Wilcox (2015), pp. 25–33.
- Wilson, Andrew (2015). Alexander McQueen: Blood Beneath the Skin. New York City: Simon and Schuster. ISBN 978-1-4767-7674-3.
