= Niall McInerney (photographer) =

Niall McInerney is a fashion photographer, best known for his international catwalk photography.

== Early life and career ==
Born in Limerick, Ireland, on October 8, 1941, Niall McInerney had his first taste of photography as a schoolboy trying to photograph birdlife with a Kodax Box Brownie. At the age of 17 he left Ireland for London and tried his hand at a wide range of jobs, including railway porter at Paddington Station, dish washer, Wimpy chef for J. Lyons, cinema usher and projectionist.

It was not until he began a stint as stage manager in a Soho club, The Phoenix in Old Compton Street, where he started photographing the striptease artistes, that he rediscovered his interest in photography. For these photographs he was helped by Lewis Morley who at that time had a studio in Greek Street. Leaving Soho, he started to work with Tony Ross who ran Piccadilly Press. Here he would photograph groups visiting London, with London landmarks as the backdrop. This led to street photography when he was commissioned by Marubeni, a Japanese company, to take photos of stylish Londoners in fashionable locations such as Kensington High Street, The King’s Road and Camden Town. Shop windows and stores such as Biba and Vivienne Westwood’s shop Sex were a part of this. He then took up with a bunch of young people in Camden Town, who had started a boutique called Swanky Modes. These were Wallie Walters, Melanie Haberfield, Esme Young and Judy Gregson. It was here Mclnerney’s penchant for chronicling styling was born.

== Catwalk photography ==
McInerney made his debut as a catwalk photographer when he photographed a Swanky Modes collection, shown in St Paul’s churchyard in Covent Garden, in 1976. This led to more shows such as the Individual Clothes Show at Pillar Hall.

Some of his earlier catwalk commissions included London-based designers such as Bill Gibb, Zandra Rhodes, John Bates, Jean Muir, Maxfield Parrish, Betty Jackson and Bruce Oldfield. Then Vivienne Westwood, Jasper Conran, Ghost, John Rocha and John Galliano all became regular clients. From there came commissions from magazines such as Newsweek and Harper’s Bazaar, to cover the shows in Paris, Milan and New York City, womenswear, menswear and couture. McInerney’s body of work records the time of fashions best loved supermodels such as Linda Evangelista, Cindy Crawford, Naomi Campbell, Kate Moss and Christy Turlington. Besides the models, he photographed the young designers graduate shows from St Martins, including John Galliano, Alexander McQueen and Stella McCartney, people behind and in front of the catwalk, designers, stylists, editors, show organisers, makeup artists, flaneurs and flanuses and above all the photographers, who he calls “the foot soldiers of fashion”.

Even while McInerney was photographing the work of fashion’s most prestigious designers he never abandoned smaller venues and collections. Over the years he has photographed the Saint Martins’ graduation collections, including those of some of most important fashion designers of the twentieth century. Alexander McQueen's collection Jack the Ripper Stalks His Victims, John Galliano's Les Incroyables, and Stella McCartney's graduation show are all features of McInerney’s Central Saint Martins work.

He retired from catwalk photography in 2000. In 2011, Bloomsbury Publishing purchased Niall McInerney’s complete archive of fashion images (over 500,000). The archive is an unparalleled two-decade-long photographic testimonial which showcases the photographer’s diverse work during a vibrant period of fashion history. Bloomsbury is digitizing McInerney’s work to create a fully searchable online archive for students and academics of fashion, history and related fields.

== Publications and contributions ==
McInerney has contributed to the following publications:

- Sandy Black, Knitwear in Fashion, London: Thames & Hudson, 2002
- Caroline Evans, Fashion at the Edge, London: Yale UP, 2003
- Colin McDowell, Galliano, London: Weidenfeld & Nicolson, 1997
- Colin McDowell, Jean-Paul Gaultier, London: Cassell, 2000
- Ted Polhemus, Streetstyle: from sidewalk to catwalk, London: Thames and Hudson, 1994
- Christian Lacroix, Lacroix: Pieces of a Pattern, London: Thames and Hudson, 1997
- Iain R Webb, Bill Cribb: Fashion and Fantasy, London: V&A Publishing, 2008
- Alice Rawsthorn, Yves Saint Laurent, London: Orion Press, 1999
- Gerda Buxbaum, Icons of Fashion: The 20th Century, Prestel, 2007
- Alistair O’Neill, London After a Fashion London: Reaktion Books, 2007
- Jane Mulvagh, Vivienne Westwood: An Unfashionable Life: London, Harper Collins, 2011
- Amy De La Haye, Chanel: Couture and Industry, London: V&A Publishing, 2011
