= Devils and Angels =

Devils and Angels may refer to:

- Arum maculatum, or devils and angels, plant species of the family Araceae
- "Devils and Angels" (song), 2003 song by Toby Lightman
- Devils & Angels (album), 2007 album by Mêlée

== See also ==
- Devil and Angel
- Angels and Devils
- Djibril – The Devil Angel
