= Julia Rausing =

British philanthropist (1961–2024)

Julia Helen Rausing (née Delves Broughton; 11 February 1961 – 18 April 2024) was a British philanthropist. She co-founded the Julia and Hans Rausing Trust with her husband in 2014, which became one of the largest philanthropic funds in the UK.

== Early life ==
Julia Helen Delves Broughton was born in 1961 to Sir Evelyn Delves Broughton, 12th Baronet and Helen Delves Broughton (née Shore). She had an older sister, Isabella Blow, a younger brother, John, and a younger sister, Lavinia. Julia and her sisters grew up at Doddington Hall in Cheshire and studied at Heathfield School.

== Early career ==
Broughton, like her sisters, was left £5000 by her father on his death. The majority of his wealth was left to his third wife. Broughton worked as a personal assistant and then as a secretary at Christie's. She became a senior director there.

Broughton met Hans Rausing in the early 2000s at Christie's. She supported him after the death of his first wife and psychiatric hospitalisation, and they married at Woburn Abbey in July 2014.

== Philanthropic work ==
Rausing co-founded the Julia and Hans Rausing Trust with her husband in 2014 to support charities in the UK. The Trust became one of the largest charitable grant-makers in the country.

In 2019, the Rausings donated the largest donation that English Heritage had received at that point, to fund a new bridge to Tintagel Castle.

Rausing led an initiative, the Charity Survival Fund, during the COVID-19 pandemic to provide £35 million to charities struggling to raise funds during lockdowns. This was the single biggest donation to NHS Charities Together.

In 2023, the Trust identified hospices at critically low funding levels and provided £8.7million to 27 at financial risk.

In 2025, the National Gallery announced a pledge of £150 million from the Rausing Trust to support its planned expansion.

== Death and legacy ==
Rausing died on 18 April 2024, at the age of 63, after an extended period of living with cancer.

The National Gallery has a room named for Rausing and her spouse, the Julia and Hans Rausing Room (Room 32). A former Moravian Church in Malmesbury was renamed the Julia and Hans Rausing Building in 2018, with funding to support its use for education, heritage, culture and the arts.
