= Demons and Angels =

Demons and Angels may refer to:

- "Demons and Angels" (song), a 2018 song by A Boogie wit da Hoodie
- "Demons & Angels" (Red Dwarf), an episode of science fiction sit-com Red Dwarf

== See also ==
- Angels and Demons (disambiguation)
