= Angels and Devils =

Angels & Devils may refer to:

- Angels and Devils (TV series), a 1983 Hong Kong television drama serial produced by TVB
- Angels & Devils (Fuel album)
- Angels and Devils (The Spectacular Spider-Girl chapter), 2009
- Angels & Devils (Sarah Darling album), 2011
- Angels & Devils (The Bug album), 2014
- "Angels and Devils" (Numb3rs), an episode of the American television show Numb3rs
- Angels and Devils (game), on which Conway's Angel problem is based

== See also ==
- Angels and Demons (disambiguation)
- Devils and Angels (disambiguation)
