= Eva Rausing =

American businesswoman and philanthropist

Eva Louise Rausing
- Born: Eva Louise Kemeny; 7 March 1964; Hong Kong
- Died: 7 May 2012 (aged 48); Cadogan Place, Belgravia, London, England
- Occupation: Philanthropist
- Known for: Shares in Tetra Pak
- Spouse: Hans Kristian Rausing (m. 1992)
- Parent(s): Tom Kemeny (father); Nancy Kemeny (mother)

Eva Louise Rausing (née Kemeny; 7 March 1964 – c. 7 May 2012) was a businesswoman and philanthropist, and a member of the Rausing family, which owns the food packaging business Tetra Pak. She was the wife of Hans Kristian Rausing, whom she met in a rehab clinic in her native U.S., and with whom she had four children.

== Biography ==
She was born Eva Louise Kemeny, a daughter of Tom Kemeny, a PepsiCo executive. Rausing was the UK patron of international drug abuse prevention charity Mentor, and together with her husband, she also provided financial backing to Action on Addiction, a charity that helps young people with drink and drug problems.

In 2008, Rausing was arrested after trying to enter the United States embassy in central London while carrying wraps of cocaine and heroin. She was held outside the embassy in Mayfair, leading to a police raid on the couple's Chelsea home, where more than £1,500 of drugs were found. Her husband, Hans Kristian Rausing, the heir to the £5bn Tetra Pak drink packaging empire, was then also arrested.

== Death ==
On 10 July 2012, she was found dead at her home in Belgravia, London. Her 49-year-old husband was arrested in connection with her death and on suspicion of drugs charges. On 17 July, he was charged with delaying the burial of her body. Hans Kristian Rausing pleaded guilty, and was sentenced on 1 August to ten months' imprisonment, suspended for two years; the Judge required him to attend a two-year drug rehabilitation programme. The court heard that her heart pacemaker indicated that Eva Rausing probably died on 7 May. At the time of her death, she was one of the wealthiest women in the United Kingdom.

On 29 August 2012, the British journalist Ben Quinn revealed in The Guardian that in 2011 Eva Rausing had passed on information to Swedish prosecutors about the unsolved 1986 murder of Swedish prime minister Olof Palme. Scotland Yard had confirmed the day before that it had given information to Swedish authorities, who wanted to question the widower, Hans Kristian Rausing, as a possible witness about the information his wife claimed to have obtained. Gunnar Wall, a Swedish author who has written two books on the Palme killing, said that Rausing had contacted him in June 2011, claiming that she had learned that Palme had been killed by a Swedish businessman, who feared that Palme was a threat to his business. Wall had conducted an email correspondence with Rausing, who told him that she had written to the businessman on three occasions about the allegations. In one e-mail to Wall, she wrote: "Don't forget to investigate if I should suddenly die! Just joking, I hope." Wall told the Guardian: "When her e-mails stopped, I did not think too much about it, until I heard that she had died in circumstances that were unclear ... She also told me that she was going to inform the prosecutors in Sweden and it seemed like she had some arrangement to meet them."

On 14 December 2012, a coroner said Rausing died as a result of her "dependent abuse" of drugs.
