= Anderson & Sheppard =

British bespoke tailors

Anderson & Sheppard Limited
- Trade name: Anderson & Sheppard
- Type: Private
- Industry: Tailoring
- Founded: 1906
- Headquarters: London
- Website: anderson-sheppard.co.uk/

Anderson & Sheppard is a bespoke tailor on Savile Row, London, established in the Row in 1906. It also sells ready-made menswear from its shop in nearby Clifford Street and online.

It specialises in the 'English Drape Cut'.

== History ==
The company was established in 1906, with its original location at 13 Savile Row, London. In 1927, the company moved to No. 30 Savile Row.

Since 2004, it has been owned by Anda Rowland who inherited it from her father.

In 2005, its shop moved to Old Burlington Street and has remained there since.

== Clientele ==
Former clients have included Fred Astaire, Gary Cooper, Noël Coward, and Bryan Ferry. In King Charles' 2005 wedding to then Camilla Parker Bowles, he wore a morning suit Anderson & Sheppard had made for him 13 years earlier.

In 2004, Tom Ford became a customer of the firm, commissioning suits that would later appear in a W magazine photo shoot. Female clients have included Fran Lebowitz and Marlene Dietrich.

== In popular culture ==
Clothing from the tailor has been featured in several films and television shows including the James Bond Franchise, and Wall Street (1987).

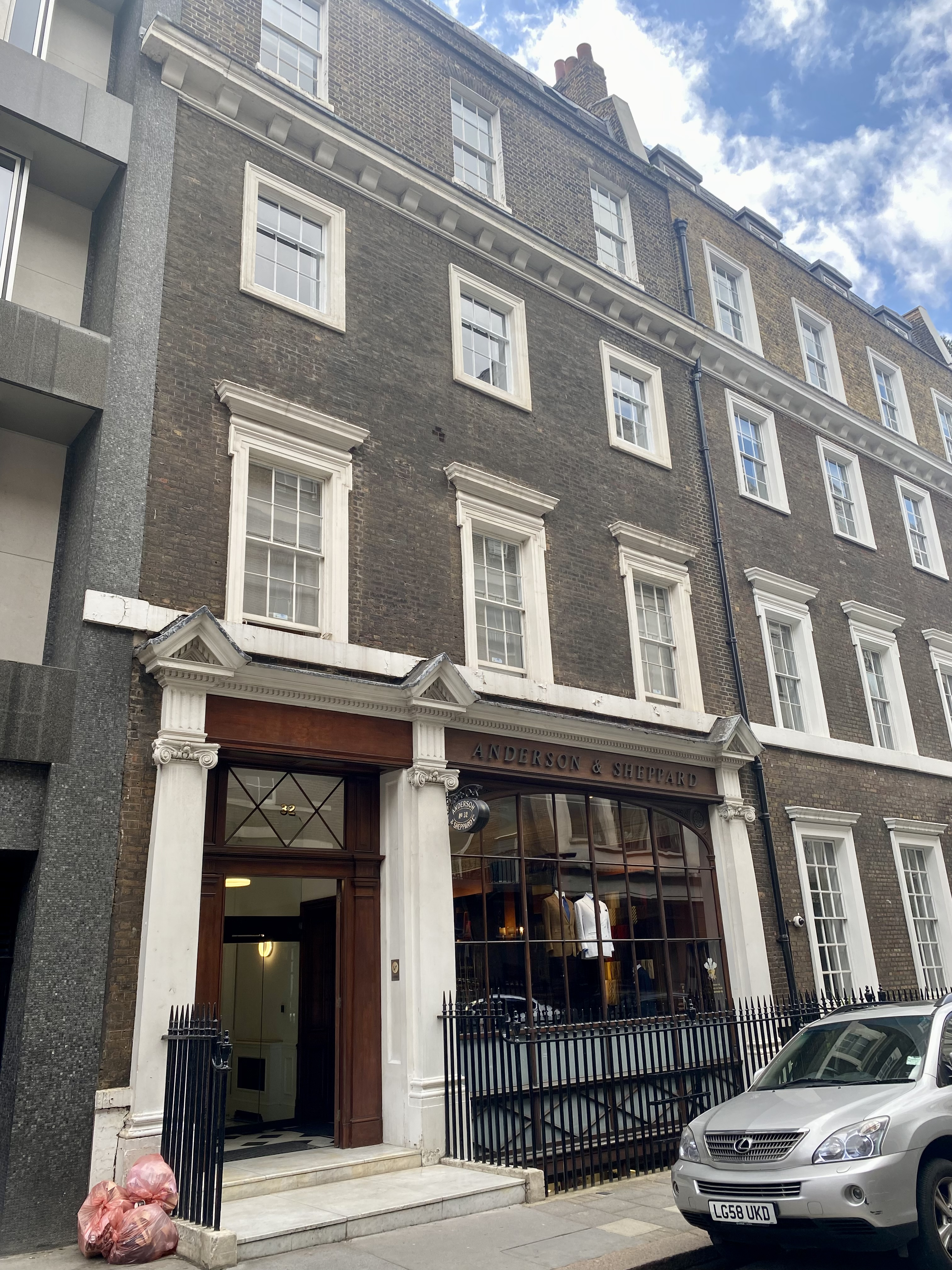
Shop on Old Burlington Street
