= Isabella Blow =

English magazine editor (1958–2007)

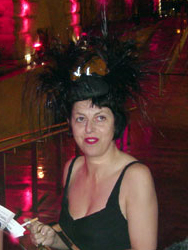
- Blow in 2005
- Born: Isabella Delves Broughton; 19 November 1958; Marylebone, London, England
- Died: 7 May 2007 (aged 48); Gloucester, Gloucestershire, England
- Resting place: Gloucester Cathedral
- Years active: 1993–2007
- Spouses: Nicholas Taylor (m. 1981; div. 1983) Detmar Blow (m. 1989)

Isabella Blow (née Delves Broughton; 19 November 1958 – 7 May 2007) was an English magazine editor. She was mentor to Philip Treacy, and is credited with discovering the models Stella Tennant and Sophie Dahl, and fashion designer Alexander McQueen, beginning when she bought the entirety of his graduate show Jack the Ripper Stalks His Victims.

== Early life ==
Born Isabella Delves Broughton in Marylebone, London, she was the eldest child of Major Sir Evelyn Delves Broughton, a military officer, and his second wife, Helen Mary Shore, a barrister. Sir Evelyn was the only son of Sir Jock Delves Broughton; his sister, Rosamond, married the 15th Lord Lovat in 1938.

Blow was known as 'Issy'. Blow had two sisters, Julia and Lavinia; her brother, John, drowned in the family's swimming pool at the age of two. This had a profound effect on her. In 1972, when she was 14, her parents separated and her mother left the household, bidding each daughter farewell with a handshake. Her parents divorced two years later. Isabella did not get along with her father, who bequeathed her £5,000 from his estate, which was worth more than one million pounds.

Blow studied for her A-levels at Heathfield School, after which she enrolled at a secretarial college and then took odd jobs. She told Tamsin Blanchard of The Observer in 2002:

I've done the most peculiar jobs. I was working in a scone shop for years, selling apricot-studded scones. I was a cleaner in London for two years. I wore a handkerchief with knots on the side, and my cousin saw me in the post office and said, What are you doing? I said, What do you think I look like I'm doing? I'm a cleaner!

== Career ==
Blow moved to New York City in 1979 to study Chinese art at Columbia University and shared a flat with the actress Catherine Oxenberg. A year later, she left the Art History programme at Columbia, moved to Texas, and worked for Guy Laroche. In 1981 she married her first husband, Nicholas Taylor (whom she divorced in 1983), and was introduced to the fashion director of the US edition of Vogue, Anna Wintour. Blow was hired initially as Wintour's assistant, but it was not long before she was assisting André Leon Talley. While working in New York, she befriended Andy Warhol and Jean-Michel Basquiat.

She returned to London in 1986 and worked for Michael Roberts, then the fashion director of Tatler and The Sunday Times Style magazine. During this period she was romantically linked to editor Tim Willis. In 1989, Blow married her second husband, barrister and art dealer Detmar Hamilton Blow, a grandson of the early 20th-century society architect Detmar Blow, in Gloucester Cathedral. Philip Treacy designed her wedding headdress, which began a professional relationship. Realizing Treacy's talent, Blow established Treacy in her London flat, where he worked on his collections. She began wearing Treacy's hats, making them a signature part of her flamboyant style. In a 2002 interview with Tamsin Blanchard, Blow declared that she wore extravagant hats for a practical reason:

[...] to keep everyone away from me. They say, Oh, can I kiss you? I say, No, thank you very much. That's why I've worn the hat. Goodbye. I don't want to be kissed by all and sundry. I want to be kissed by the people I love.

In 1993 she worked with the photographer Steven Meisel producing the Babes in London shoot, which featured Plum Sykes, Bella Freud and Honor Fraser. She discovered Alexander McQueen and purchased his entire graduate collection for £5,000, paying it off in weekly £100 installments. Spotting Sophie Dahl, Blow described her as "a blow up doll with brains", and launched her career. Blow supported both the fashion world and the art world. Artists Tim Noble and Sue Webster created a shadow portrait of her which was displayed in the National Portrait Gallery. Blow was the fashion director of Tatler and consulted for DuPont, Lycra, Lacoste, and Swarovski. She became the subject of an exhibition in 2002 entitled When Philip met Isabella, which featured sketches and photographs of her wearing Treacy's hat designs.

In 2004 Blow had an acting cameo playing a character called Antonia Cook in the film The Life Aquatic with Steve Zissou. She starred in 2005 in a project by artist Matthieu Laurette, commissioned and produced by Frieze Projects 2005 and entitled "What Do They Wear at Frieze Art Fair?" It consisted of daily guided tours of Frieze Art Fair led by Blow and fellow international fashion experts Peter Saville, Kira Joliffe, and Bay Garnett. Shortly before her death, Blow was the creative director and stylist of a series of books for an Arabic beauty magazine, Alef; the books were being produced by Kuwaiti fashion entrepreneur Sheikh Majed al-Sabah.

== Illness ==
Toward the end of her life, Blow became seriously depressed and was reportedly anguished over her inability to "find a home in a world she influenced". Daphne Guinness, a friend of Blow's, stated: "She was upset that Alexander McQueen didn't take her along when he sold his brand to Gucci. Once the deals started happening, she fell by the wayside. Everybody else got contracts, and she got a free dress". According to a 2002 interview with Tamsin Blanchard, it was Blow who brokered the deal in which Gucci purchased McQueen's label. Other pressures on her included financial problems (Blow was disinherited by her father in 1994) and infertility.

Isabella and Detmar Blow separated in 2004. Detmar Blow went on to have an affair with Stephanie Theobald, the society editor of British Harper's Bazaar, while his estranged wife entered into a liaison with a gondolier she met in Venice. During the couple's separation, Blow was diagnosed with bipolar disorder and began undergoing electroconvulsive therapy. For a time, the treatments appeared to be helpful. During this period she also had an affair with Matthew Mellon; however, after an eighteen-month separation, Isabella and Detmar Blow were reconciled. Soon afterward, she was diagnosed with ovarian cancer.

Depressed over her waning celebrity status and her cancer diagnosis, Blow began telling friends that she was suicidal. In 2006 and 2007, Blow repeatedly tried to kill herself.

== Death ==
On 6 May 2007, during a weekend house party at Hilles, where the guests included Treacy and his partner, Stefan Bartlett, Blow announced that she was going shopping. Instead, Blow was later discovered collapsed on a bathroom floor and was taken to Gloucestershire Royal Hospital, where she told the doctor she had drunk weed killer. She died at the hospital the following day. Blow's death was initially reported as being caused by ovarian cancer; however, a coroner later ruled the death a suicide.

Her funeral was held at Gloucester Cathedral on 15 May 2007. Her casket, made of willow, was surmounted by one of her Philip Treacy hats as well as a floral tribute, and her pallbearers included her godson Otis Ferry, a son of the rock star Bryan Ferry (in 2010, Bryan Ferry dedicated his Olympia album in memoriam Isabella Blow and David Williams). Actor Rupert Everett and actress Joan Collins delivered eulogies. Opera singer Charles Eliasch sang. A memorial service was held in the Guards Chapel in London on 18 September 2007, where Anna Wintour and Geordie Greig spoke. Prince Michael and Princess Michael of Kent were in attendance. Wintour's eulogy and part of the memorial service can be seen in DVD disc two of The September Issue.
