= Plato's Atlantis =

2010 fashion collection by Alexander McQueen

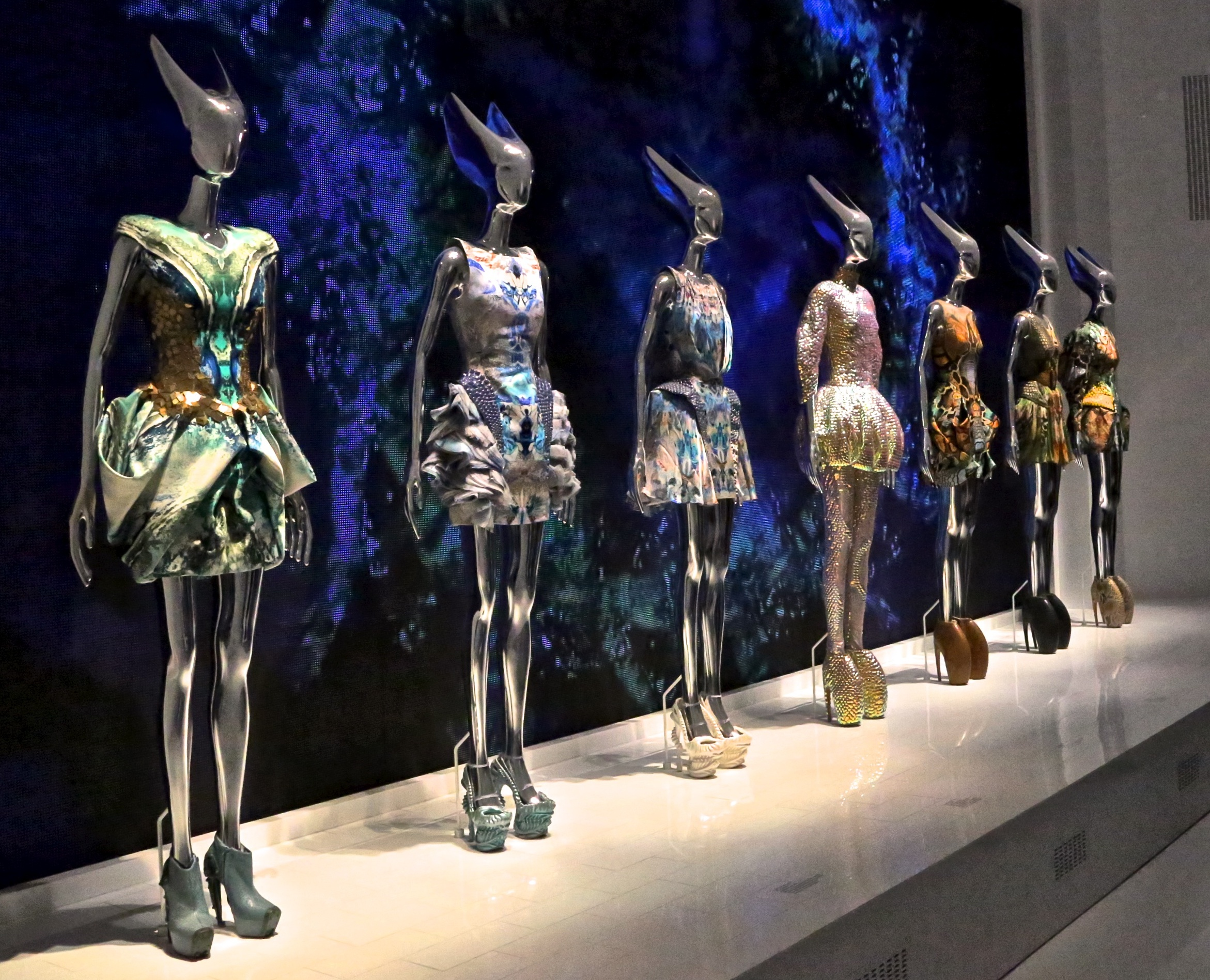
Clothing from Plato's Atlantis on display at Alexander McQueen: Savage Beauty, Victoria and Albert Museum, 2015

Plato's Atlantis is the thirty-fifth collection by British fashion designer Alexander McQueen, released for the Spring/Summer 2010 season of his eponymous fashion house. Drawing on climate change, evolutionary theory, and his love of diving, McQueen envisioned a world where humans had evolved using biological engineering to survive underwater after the sea level rose and flooded the earth. The designs depict the transition of humans from terrestrial to oceanic across two main phases, using a saturated colour palette, elaborate digital prints, and intricate garment construction. Plato's Atlantis is known for its unique platform shoes, especially the armadillo shoes, with their 9-inch (23 cm) spike heels. It was his final fully-realised mainline collection; he committed suicide in February 2010. (Note: Plato's Atlantis is often called McQueen's final complete runway collection. However, he presented a menswear collection, The Bone Collector (Autumn/Winter 2010), in January 2010, one month before his death. He left his Autumn/Winter 2010 womenswear collection, Angels and Demons, incomplete at the time of his death. It was finished and presented by his team.)

Forty-five looks were presented at the runway show, which was staged on 6 October 2009 at the Palais omnisports de Paris-Bercy in Paris. Two cameras on robotic mounts were placed on tracks on the stage, projecting the show and the audience to a large screen at the rear of the stage as well as capturing it for a livestream. Hair and make-up was used to make the models appear increasingly inhuman as the show went on. The show served as the debut of the Lady Gaga single "Bad Romance", and she wore the show's final outfit in the song's music video.

Plato's Atlantis is widely remembered as one of McQueen's greatest achievements for its blend of natural and technological elements, runway showmanship, and pioneering attempt at live-streaming. (Note: Plato's Atlantis was advertised, and is often described, as the first livestreamed fashion show in history; this is disputed. Louise Crewe qualifies Plato's Atlantis as the first runway show to be streamed live to the internet from a Fashion Week event.) Academic analysis has focused on the digital technology, animal imagery and environmental messaging, and its status as McQueen's final finished collection. The collection was a retail success and popular with celebrities as red carpet attire. Ensembles from Plato's Atlantis are held by museums and have appeared in exhibitions such as the McQueen retrospective Alexander McQueen: Savage Beauty.

== Background ==
British fashion designer Alexander McQueen was known for his imaginative, sometimes controversial designs, and dramatic fashion shows. Over the course of his career, which lasted from 1992 until his death in 2010, he explored a broad range of ideas and themes, particularly sexuality, death, violence, romanticism. He learned tailoring as an apprentice on Savile Row, and dressmaking as head designer at French fashion house Givenchy. (Note: From October 1996 to October 2001, McQueen was simultaneously head designer at Givenchy and at his own label.) Although he worked in ready-to-wear – clothing produced for retail sale – his showpiece designs featured a degree of craftsmanship that verged on haute couture. His collections were historicist, in that he adapted historical designs and narratives, and self-referential, in that he revisited and reworked ideas between collections.

McQueen's personal fixations had a strong influence on his designs, especially his love of the natural world, which he referenced visually and by incorporating natural materials. His reference library included volumes of National Geographic, scientific illustrations, and photographic studies. His affinity for water and the ocean was lifelong: he enjoyed diving, and his house by the sea had multiple aquariums. This oceanic fascination was reflected in his career from its earliest stages, with runway shows that included water features and designs inspired by marine life. His final three completed collections, including Plato's Atlantis, explored his concerns about human impact on the environment and the wastefulness of the fashion cycle. All three featured complex, digitally engineered prints. As a cinephile, he also drew on his favourite films to inspire his collections.

McQueen described the fashion industry as toxic and suffocating, and was often ambivalent about continuing his career. He expressed his disillusionment through collections that critiqued the industry. By the mid to late 2000s, he had reached a point of exhaustion, but feared putting his employees out of work if he stepped down from his brand. His personal life had become increasingly unstable by the time he was working on Plato's Atlantis. His reliance on drugs had become a serious concern, and he was openly discussing suicide, although he chose to press on with his work.

== Concept and collection ==
=== Inspiration and development ===
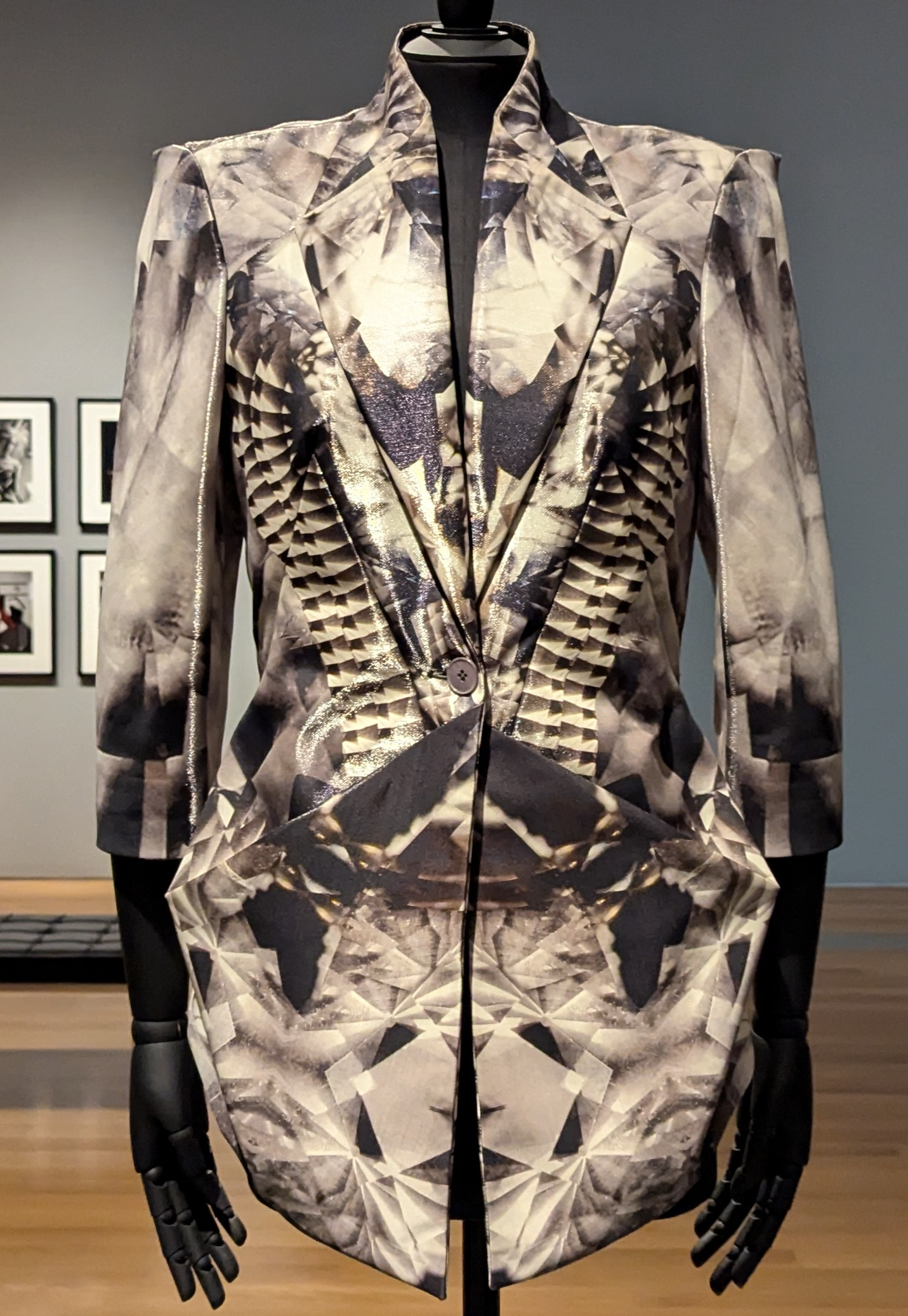
Digitally-patterned look from Natural Dis-tinction Un-natural Selection (Spring/Summer 2009)

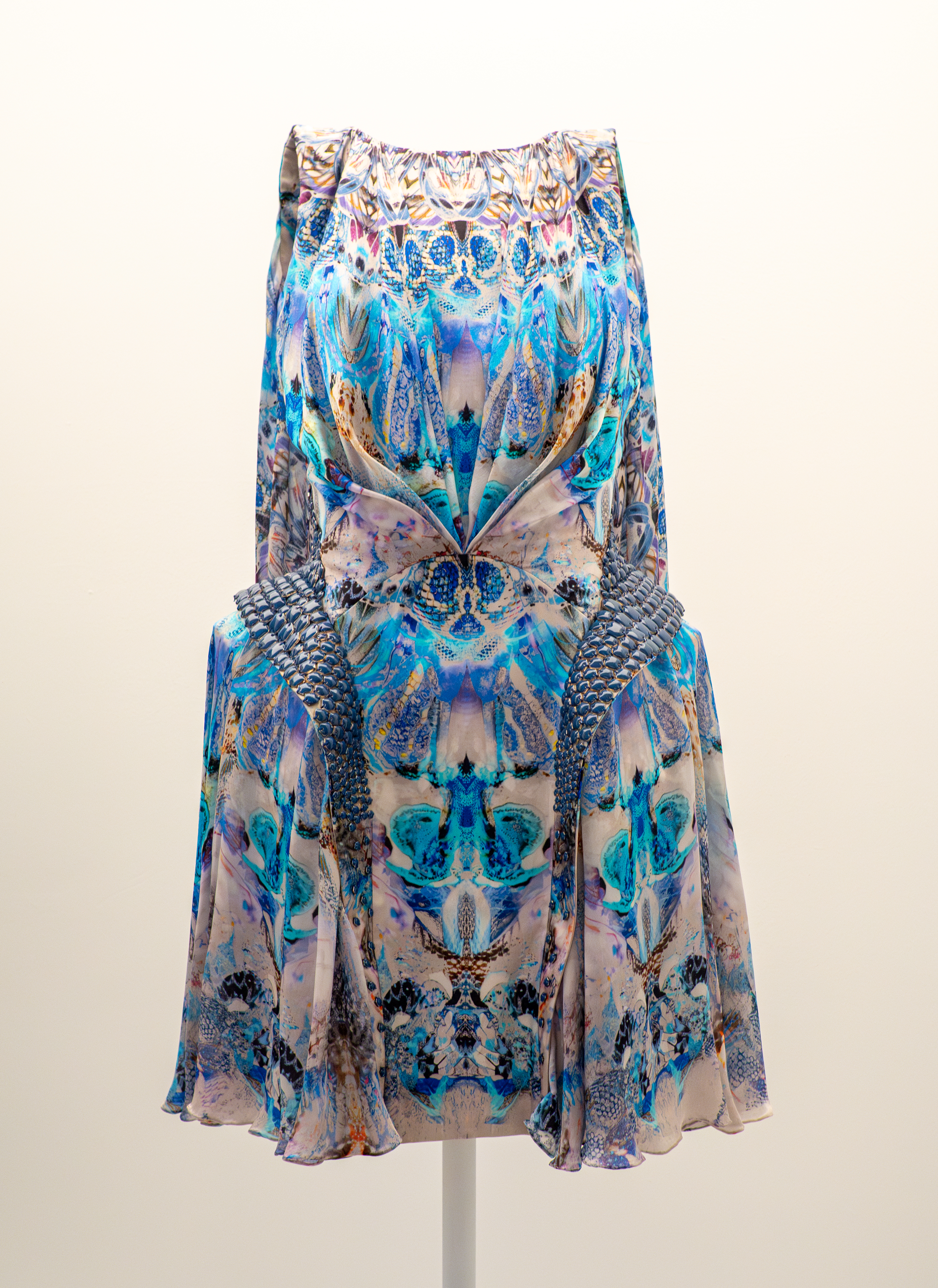
Look 25, silk dress with digital print, from Plato's Atlantis

Plato's Atlantis (Spring/Summer 2010) is the thirty-fifth collection McQueen made for his eponymous fashion house. It is his final fully-realised mainline collection; he committed suicide in February 2010. Its name comes from the allegorical sunken island of Atlantis, described in the works of the Greek philosopher Plato. McQueen thought of Atlantis as a "sanctuary in bad times". McQueen conceived the collection while on vacation in Thailand with his friend Annabelle Neilson. Drawing on climate change, evolutionary theory, and his love of diving, McQueen envisioned a world where humans had evolved using biological engineering to survive underwater after the sea level rose and flooded the earth. He also drew from the brightly coloured marine life drawings of Ernst Haeckel and the James Cameron film The Abyss (1989), in which a dive team discovers an alien city at the bottom of the sea and undergo a spiritual awakening.

Plato's Atlantis expands on techniques of printing and construction which McQueen pioneered in Natural Dis-tinction Un-natural Selection (Spring/Summer 2009). The thirty-six unique prints made for Plato's Atlantis were more colourful and elaborate compared to those in its predecessor. McQueen normally liked to adapt ideas from historical fashion and art, but took a different tack for Plato's Atlantis. He had his team assemble inspiration boards showing aerial views of the earth, brightly coloured marine life, rusted shipwrecks, figures draped in silver cloth, and reflective surfaces. There were stills from The Abyss as well as Terminator 2 (1991), showing the titular character in its liquid-metal form. Partway through the process, he had the boards turned around to display the prints he had developed for the collection, saying he wanted to abandon referencing entirely and make something new.

=== Collection ===
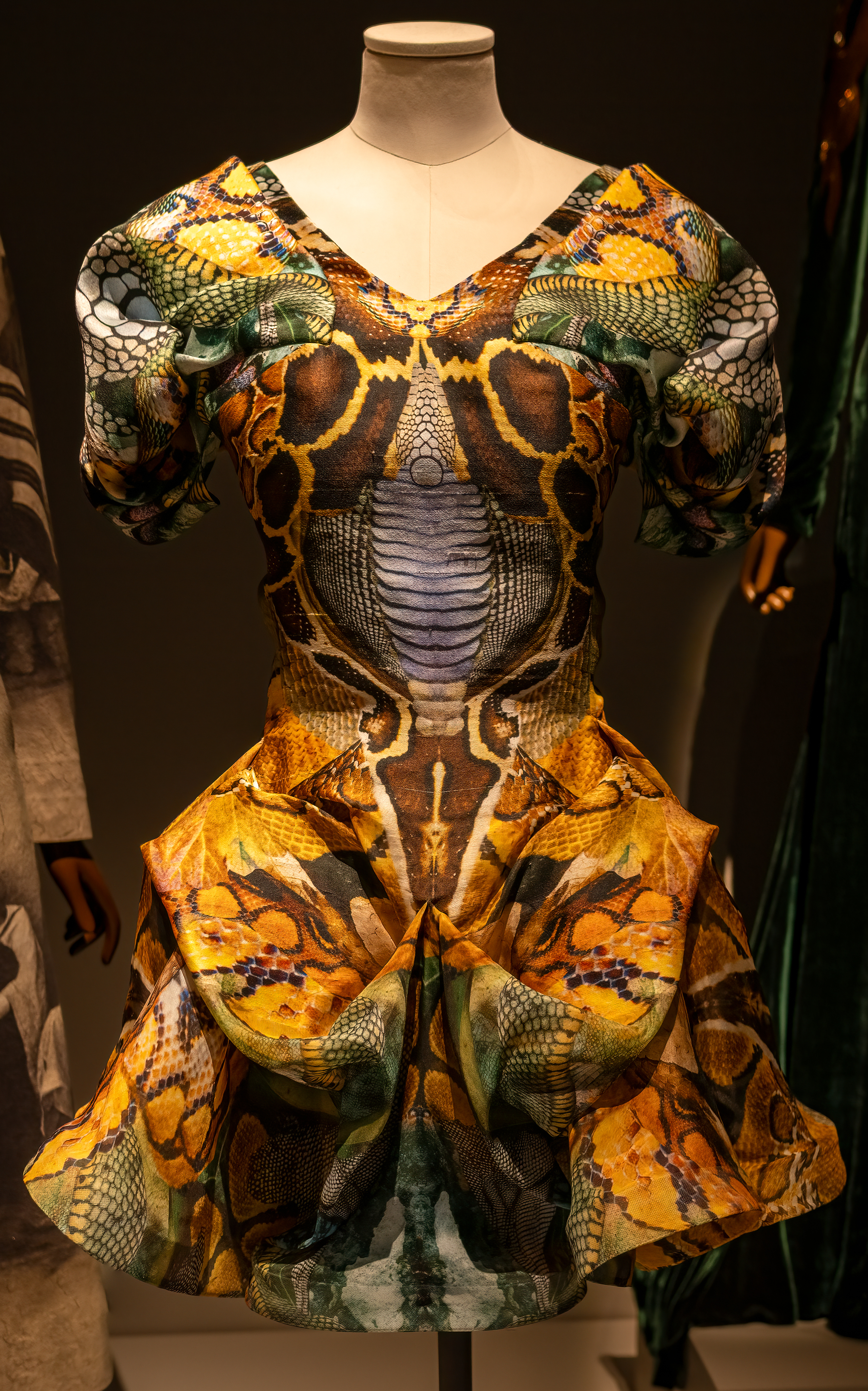
Look 4, reptile print dress, at Dress, Dreams and Desire (2025)

Plato's Atlantis depicts the transition of humans from terrestrial to oceanic across two main phases, using a saturated colour palette, elaborate digital prints, and intricate garment construction. Fifteen of the forty-five looks presented on the runway were so complex that they were intended only as showpieces. The first phase features designs that use earth tones and patterns based on snakeskin and moths to evoke the appearance of land animals or vegetation. The second phase primarily uses more abstracted prints in shades of blue and aqua. These were derived from sea creatures and aerial views of the ocean and Great Barrier Reef, suggesting an adaptation to an increasingly submerged planet.

The primary silhouette, which recurs in several variations, is an hourglass-shaped minidress with round shoulders and a bell-shaped skirt, somewhat reminiscent of a jellyfish. The shape is an evolution of the structured minidresses of Natural Dis-tinction Un-natural Selection. Intricate folding created structure at the shoulders, skirts, and especially the hips, which were also emphasised in other ways. Some items had broad pannier-like hip extensions, while the placement of hexagonal hip sequins on other items resembled pollen baskets on bees. The folds on some items resembled gills.

While the majority of items presented were minidresses, some looks featured trousers or all-in-ones. Other silhouettes included so-called "stingray" jackets made to resemble the animal. Some skirts and leggings were based on scuba diving gear, with thick dark fabrics, rubberised looks, or laser-cut leather details. Sequined leggings reminded theorist Jonathan Faiers of shed snake skins. Despite McQueen's desire to focus on new ideas, some historical elements remained, particularly his signature frock coat. Journalist Dana Thomas remarked that one of the scuba-based outfits had proportions from Elizabethan era fashion.

A variety of textiles were used, ranging from lighter fabrics like chiffon, taffeta, and organza, as well as somewhat heavier ones like jersey, mohair, velvet, and printed jacquard. The fil coupé technique, in which an additional set of weft threads is added to create floating decorative elements on the textile’s surface, was used to merge different textiles, like velvet and chiffon, into one surface. Decorative embellishments included hand-sewn scale-like paillettes and embroidery designed to look like corroded metal. Hexagons occurred on several items as a decorative motif.

Some tailored looks in the aquatic section played on the hybridisation theme by combining two fabrics and methods of working. The sleeves were tailored grey wool more typical of menswear, but the bodies were draped printed jersey. One of these featured a print entitled "Abyss" after the Cameron film. A series of showpiece ensembles at the end of the show was made from blue iridescent gauze. Structure was added by hand-stitching metallic thread throughout. Looks 41 and 42 were tops paired with white and pink iridescent sequined leggings, while 43 and 44 were minidresses. The closing outfit, nicknamed "Neptune's Daughter" or the "Jellyfish ensemble", was a dress with matching leggings and armadillo shoes, covered entirely in enormous blue-green opalescent sequins. It represented the final stage of humanity's adaptation to an underwater environment.

=== Shoes ===
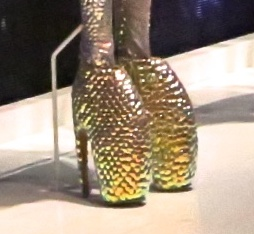
Side view of an armadillo shoe, covered in iridescent paillettes made to look like scales, from the show's final outfit, "Neptune's Daughter"

The collection is known for its three unique styles of platform shoes, referred to as the armadillo shoe, the alien shoe, and the Titanic shoe. The armadillo and alien styles drew inspiration from the biomechanical art of H. R. Giger, known for visually developing the Alien film series. These two styles were showpieces created for the runway and were not commercially produced, although many pairs of the armadillo heels were sold to private buyers following the show.

The armadillo shoes are almost 12 inches (30 cm) from top to sole, with a 9-inch (23 cm) spike heel. The body of the shoe is a convex curve, often compared to the silhouette of an armadillo or lobster claw. The shoe hides the entire foot from ankle to toe, creating the illusion that the wearer is walking en pointe in the manner of a ballerina. In actuality, the ball of the foot rests at an angle on a concealed platform, with a small bulge above the toe to facilitate lifting the heavy shoe to walk. Twenty pairs were worn in the runway show, with one extra. Each pair is decorated to match the theme of its outfit: some are covered with animal skin such as python skin or shagreen (rawhide from the cowtail stingray), while others have iridescent paillettes resembling scales. Three models refused to walk in the show due to concerns about falling.

The ridged biomorphic appearance of the alien shoes draws on the Xenomorph monster from the Alien films, with a spine that spirals up the heel and around the sole and a finger crossing over the toe box. They also evoke the unusual skeletal structures of deep-sea fish. They were 3D printed from resin. Eleven pairs were made for the runway, in shades ranging from bone white to silver to blue.

The Titanic shoes reference the 1912 sinking of the ocean liner RMS Titanic. Their heels were made from pieces of metal riveted together, visually evoking its riveted steel hull. Holes punched in the metal also called to mind Meccano, a British construction set consisting of metal pieces. This style had a matching metal handbag.

=== Production ===
I don't think it makes sense to play safe in these times. The world needs fantasy, not reality. We have enough reality today.

— Alexander McQueen, 2009 interview with Nick Knight

The complex prints and construction made the production process unusually involved. The prints were "circle-engineered", meaning that each was designed to be printed in the centre of a bolt of cloth and cut precisely to fit correctly on the garment pattern. Any change to the cut forced a corresponding change to the pattern so the seams would match precisely, and the type of fabric had to be taken into account as well. The team resorted to making three-dimensional paper dolls of each item to help McQueen visualise the complex designs. McQueen's right-hand woman, Sarah Burton, recalled that he cut and draped about half the collection personally because of the technical difficulty of fitting the patterns to the prints. In some cases, there were no patterns; McQueen constructed the garment on the stand by eye to look like it had emerged from the body. He constructed the tailored hybrid wool and jersey dresses by cutting up the tailored portions and adding them to the jersey body pieces on a mannequin. Some of the last few designs presented, Looks 41 to 44 on the runway, were put together in Paris in the few days before the show.

== Runway show ==
=== Production details ===
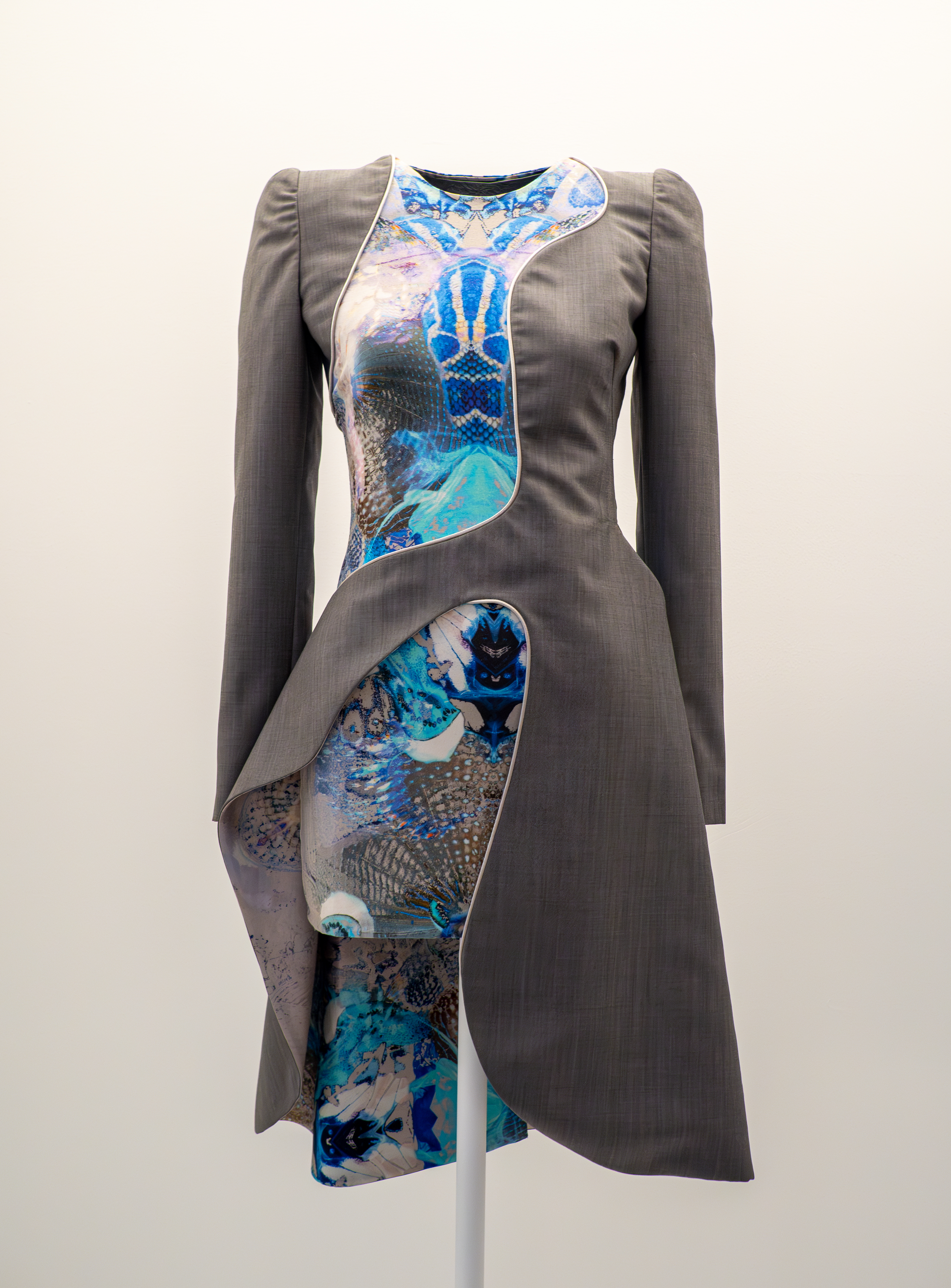
Look 28, jellyfish print and grey wool frock coat dress at Sleeping Beauties: Reawakening Fashion (2024)

The runway show was staged on 6 October 2009 at the Palais omnisports de Paris-Bercy in Paris. Production was estimated to have cost £1 million (US$1.62 million). The runway was a sheet of bright white acrylic whose starkness suggested laboratory tiles and scientific experimentation. Two cameras on robotic mounts were placed on tracks on the stage, projecting the show and the audience to a large screen at the rear of the stage as well as capturing it for a livestream. The floor reflected the screen behind it recursively.

McQueen's usual creative team was responsible for the runway show. Overall styling was handled by Camilla Nickerson, while Gainsbury & Whiting oversaw production. Joseph Bennett returned for set design. Hair was styled by Guido Palau and make-up by Peter Philips. John Gosling created the drum-based soundtrack with Raymond Watts. Photographer Nick Knight, with whom McQueen had begun working in 1996, collaborated for the livestream as well as film accompanying the show, assisted by Ruth Hogben. Hogben recalled the experience as difficult but rewarding, saying there was "no question" that she would go without sleep to ensure McQueen was satisfied with the final product.

=== Styling ===
Make-up was simple, but styled to make the models appear increasingly inhuman as the show went on. Their faces were covered with pearlised pink powder. Eyebrows were concealed and thin lines of eye-shadow were used to extend the eye horizontally. Toward the end of the show, the models' faces were further modified with facial prosthetics that gave unnatural contours to their cheekbones and temples, with some having the appearance of gills. Hair was piled in unusual cone or fin shapes. Some models were styled with braids worn close to the head as in cornrows or piled up into these shapes. The overall appearance was androgynous and alien.

The runway cameras were pre-programmed to move dynamically, getting very close to the models. Due to an oversight, the programming did not take the show's enormous hairstyles into account, creating the possibility of a collision. Knight recalled that the cameras "were swooping low across the top of them. Had they just caught one of them on the back, she would have been over, and I mean, you don't get up in those shoes. You can imagine it was fairly nail-biting stuff."

=== Runway presentation ===
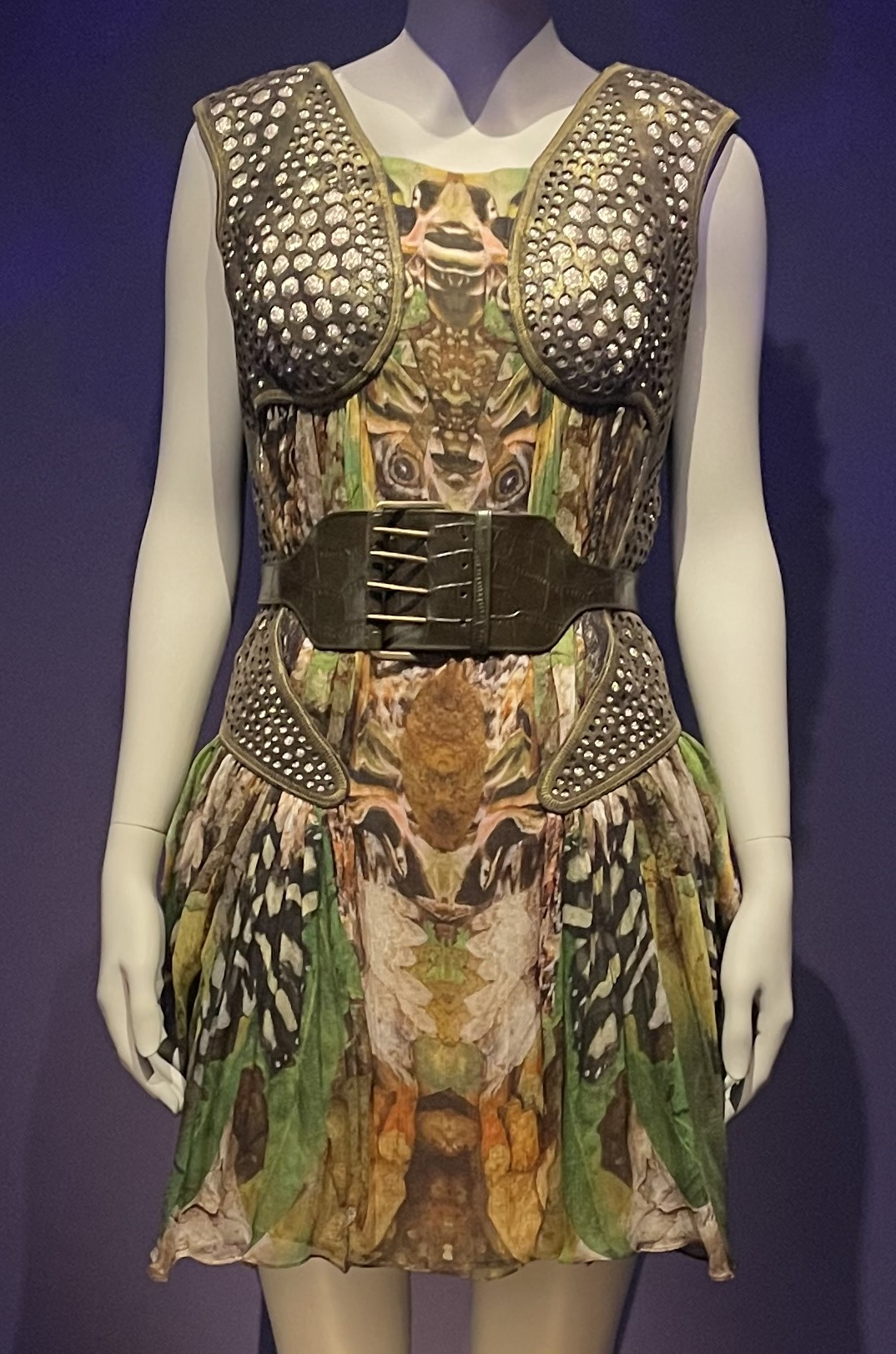
Look 13, dress with reptile print and belt, presented at Alexander McQueen: Mind, Mythos, Muse (2022)

Forty-five looks were presented across roughly two phases. The show opened with a film of model Raquel Zimmerman lying on sand, nude, with colourful snakes all over her. The snakes transformed into a pattern and the screen turned white. Magdalena Frąckowiak entered the stage, backlit to emphasise the alien silhouette of her ensemble. She wore a green and brown snakeskin-printed minidress paired with matching snakeskin armadillo shoes. The next three minidresses each had unique variations of reptilian print. Further minidresses, as well as a few ensembles with cropped trousers, continued the theme of earth tones and warm metallic shades like bronze and copper. Looks 20 through 22 were mostly coppery with some blue at the skirts.

As Constance Jablonski entered, wearing Look 23, the sound of scuba gear air intake played and another film of Zimmerman began, indicating the beginning of the underwater phase. The film shows Zimmermann floating on her back in water, face and breasts breaking the surface, before the background becomes a colourful swirling abstract. The styling of the models gradually became more exaggerated from this point. Looks 28 to 31 feature tailored grey wool looks followed by four ensembles in shiny black material. A short series of deeper blue minidresses ended with Look 40, a short jellyfish-printed dress with puffed sleeves and a puffed collar, whose folds resembled gills. This was followed by four structured iridescent garments interwoven with metallic threads, while the screen displayed a humanoid creature waving its arms in the water. The closing ensemble, "Neptune's Daughter", was worn on the runway by Polina Kasina, who had long been McQueen's fit model. The audience applauded as Kasina finished her turn, and the Lady Gaga song "Bad Romance" began to play as she walked.

Lights went up for the models taking their final turn, cameras projecting the audience onto the screen. McQueen took his bows in jeans to a cheering audience, departing the stage quickly.

=== Livestream ===
The show was livestreamed on SHOWstudio, a website for fashion film and photography curated by Nick Knight. Knight recalled spending several seasons convincing McQueen to livestream one of his runway shows, following their 2002 collaboration on a livestreamed performance in which McQueen recut a suit worn by a male model into a wedding dress. McQueen finally agreed for the Spring/Summer 2010 season; British brand Burberry also asked Knight to facilitate a livestream that season, but he declined in favour of working with McQueen, given their existing relationship. (Note: Burberry livestreamed their Autumn/Winter 2010 fashion show, with the ability to directly buy items as seen in the show, as McQueen had envisioned.) They had a mutual realisation that it would be beneficial to expand the audience for the theatrical show to the broader public rather than restricting things to, in Knight's words, "three hundred journalists and buyers who are a bit pissed off to be there".

Plato's Atlantis was advertised, and is often described, as the first livestreamed fashion show in history. This is not an undisputed claim. Rebecca Halliday reports two early low-quality livestreams by Victoria's Secret in 1999 and 2000, although these efforts were abandoned in favour of the televised Victoria's Secret Fashion Show. A few weeks before the show, Women's Wear Daily reported on McQueen's plans but asserted that he was not the first to livestream his show, listing four other houses that presented "live productions" for the Spring/Summer 2010 season. WWD did not elaborate on the details of those productions, although the Burberry show was only streamed to its flagship store in London. Louise Crewe qualifies Plato's Atlantis as the first runway show to be streamed live to the internet from a Fashion Week event.

The show featured the surprise debut of "Bad Romance"; Lady Gaga and McQueen had become friendly around this time. Even the production team had been unaware; music from Disney films had been used during rehearsal. When Gaga tweeted about the release of the song half an hour before the show, it caused a surge of traffic that crashed the livestream.

== Reception ==
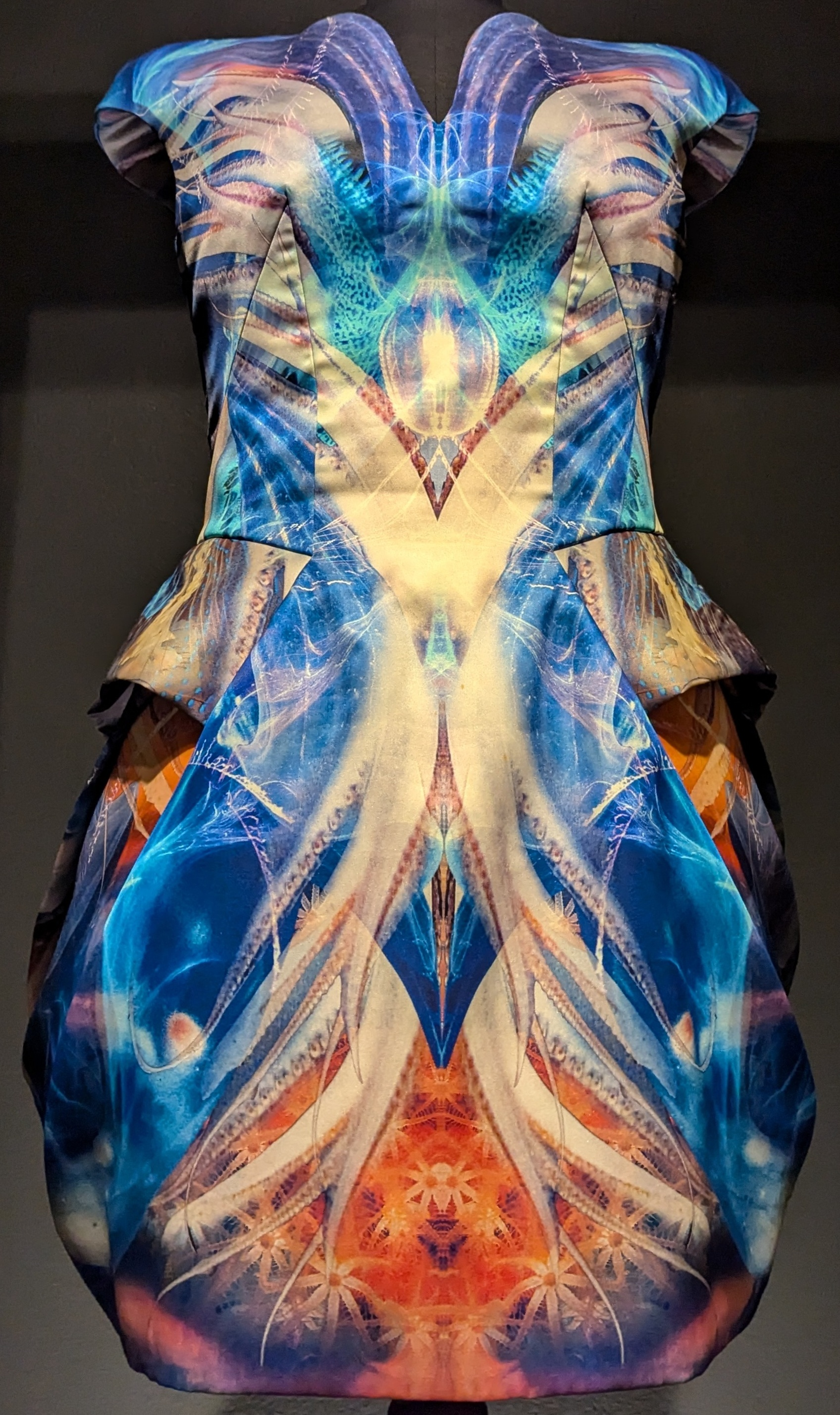
Look 38 at Lee Alexander McQueen & Ann Ray: Rendez-Vous (2024)

Plato's Atlantis is widely remembered as one of McQueen's greatest achievements for its blend of natural and technological elements, runway showmanship, and pioneering attempt at livestreaming. Retail buyers were pleased with the runway show, with one saying they intended to order all of the first twelve outfits. The collection did very well at retail. Magazines such as Glamour, L'Officiel USA, and Wonderland as well as the directors of the 2018 documentary McQueen have listed it as one of the designer's best or most iconic shows.

Curator Claire Wilcox considered it the pinnacle of McQueen's work. For Judith Watt, one of his biographers, it represented McQueen achieving "what he set out to do years before as a tailor's apprentice: to take fashion where it had never been before". Susannah Frankel, a journalist and friend of McQueen, wrote that "if the concept was among his most ambitious, its execution was even more so". Fashion theorist Jonathan Faiers called it his "most complex and visionary dialogue with nature". Kristin Knox considered it a "perfect marriage of man and machine in an innovative fashion context". Janice Miller felt it was McQueen's best use of make-up and hair as a device for expressing a collection's narrative.

Daphne Guinness, a friend of McQueen's, recalled him as being very pleased with the show afterwards. McQueen made light of the collection in a 2009 interview with Frankel, telling her "it's just a bit of fun really". Frankel described this as his way of "typically undercutting" himself and his own narratives.

== Analysis ==
=== Digital technology and livestreaming ===
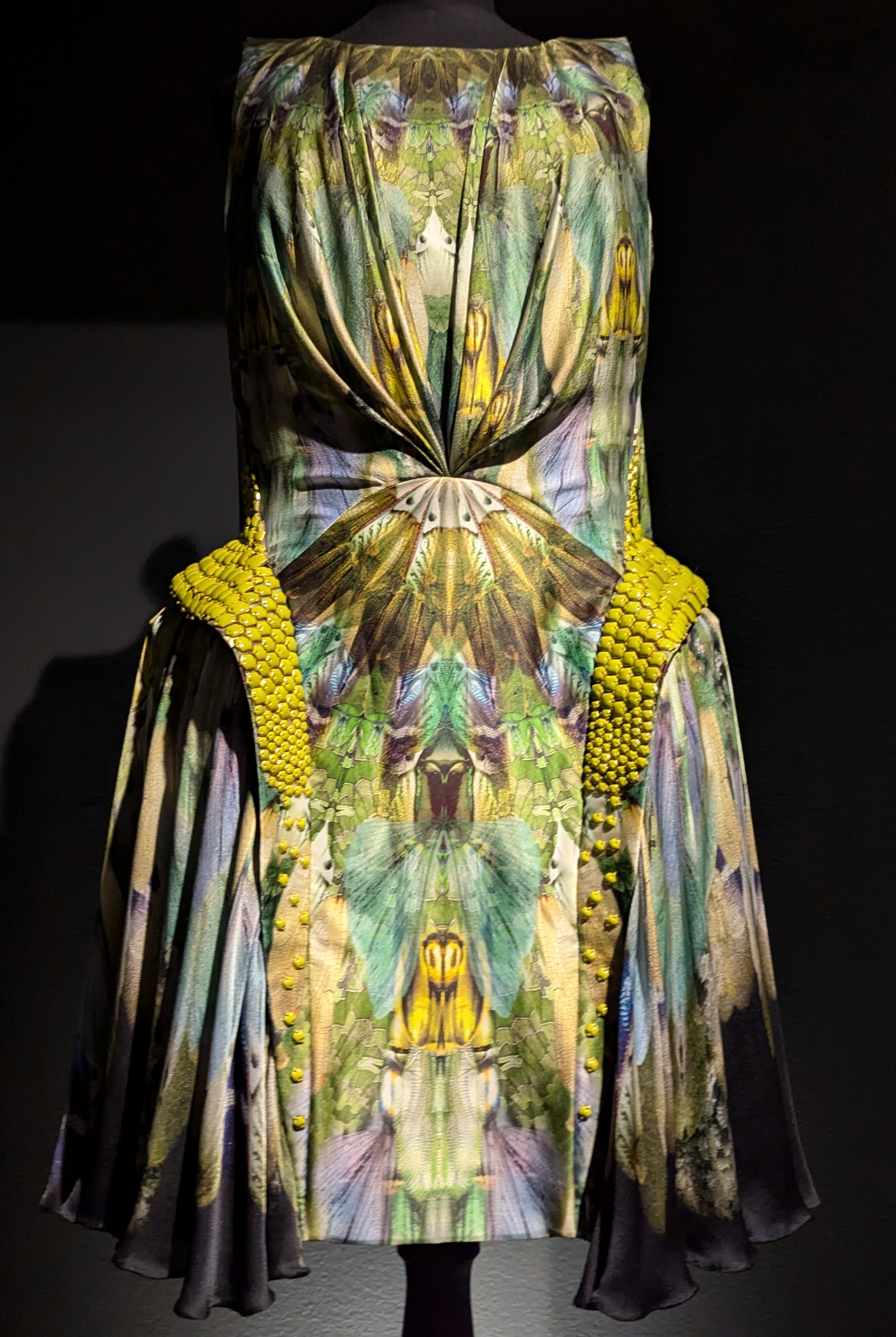
Look 7 at Rendez-Vous

The use of digital elements in the fashion industry, such as video and projection, had increased in the 2000s. McQueen frequently incorporated technology into his work in new ways, often juxtaposing it with natural elements. Claire Wilcox thought he might have been inspired to examine "the relationship between man, nature and machine" by science fiction films such as Tron (1982). He had used technology to great effect in No. 13 (Spring/Summer 1999), whose finale featured robots spray painting a white dress worn by model Shalom Harlow. His Autumn/Winter 2006 show, The Widows of Culloden, concluded with a large-scale 3D illusion of Kate Moss. It was the first fashion show to employ this kind of effect.

In many ways, the technology in Plato's Atlantis reflected ideas McQueen had explored in its predecessors. The runway cameras reminded set decorator Joseph Bennett of the robots in No. 13 but "with a further hint of malevolence and voyeurism". The cameras recording and projecting the audience onto a screen was reminiscent of the staging of Voss (Spring/Summer 2001), in which the audience was forced to watch their own reflections on a mirrored box for an hour before the show started. Knight described the cameras as McQueen's means of turning the front row, normally full of celebrities and influential industry people, into a spectacle.

McQueen's pioneering attempt to livestream the show is considered to be a turning point for fashion, contributing to a shift in the popular conception of runway shows. Originally seen as singular live spectacles staged for a select audience, they began to be viewed as permanently recorded performances widely available to a global viewership, supplementing or replacing advertising campaigns. After shows ended, social media provided a new space for the audience to immediately discuss each collection. For Autumn/Winter 2010, the season following Plato's Atlantis, all major fashion houses livestreamed their fashion week shows.

As a result of these changes, fashion theorists Adam Geczy and Vicki Karaminas described contemporary fashion as being displaced from material reality and "into a cinematic dream space". Fashion writer Nathalie Khan argued that McQueen's decision to livestream Plato's Atlantis meant that it "transcended any notion of the runway show as an event in fixed time and place". Žarko Paić cited it as an example of an attempt at a transformation in how contemporary fashion shows subversively present the body. McQueen himself felt the use of livestreaming would be a commercial opportunity: he imagined creating small capsule collections that would be immediately available for sale following the show. This sales model, sometimes called "see now buy now", has become common in fashion. Despite the emphasis on the livestream and background film, McQueen told the International Herald Tribune in October 2009 that he created his collections with an eye toward still photography: "I design the shows as stills and I think that if you look at those stills they tell the whole story."

Isabel Formica Jakob argued that the rapid turnover of the fashion cycle was damaging to designers and had been instrumental in the deterioration of McQueen's mental health. She referred to Plato's Atlantis as a turning point for the industry, suggesting that although livestreaming was "a laudable, democratic, and anti-elite premise", in practice it had accelerated the pace of fashion to an intolerable point. She argued that McQueen's suicide indicated a need to slow the fashion cycle in order to ensure that designs could be properly appreciated and protect designers' mental health.

=== Nature imagery ===
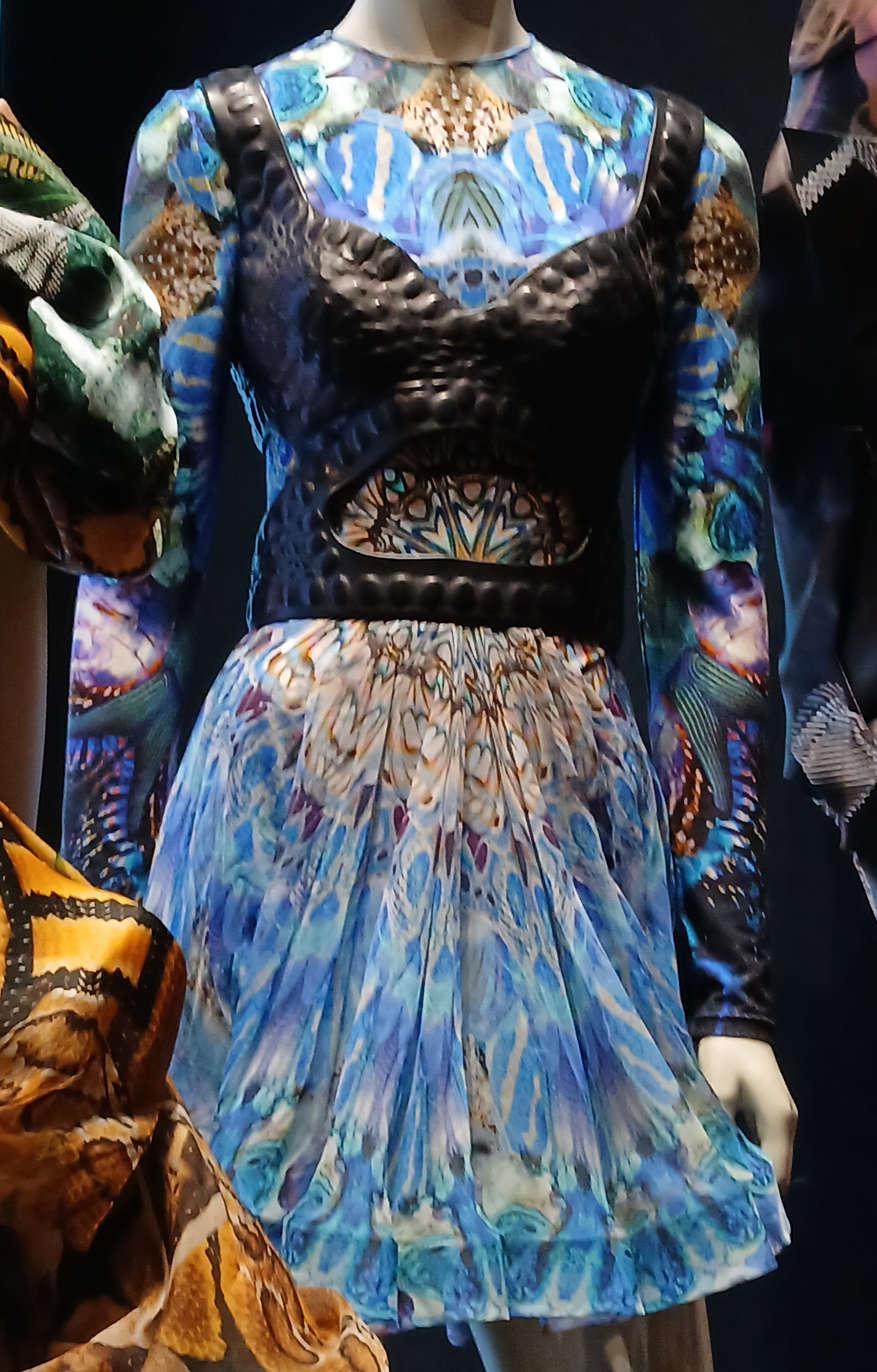
Look 36 at House of McQueen exhibit (2025)

McQueen was known for his love of nature, which he integrated into his work materially and thematically. Jonathan Faiers described Plato's Atlantis as the culmination of McQueen's multifaceted interest in nature: fascinated by its beauty and strangeness, with a scientist's "belief in the unity of all living things". Bolton placed McQueen in the tradition of the Romanticists, who revered the natural world as a source of inspiration and wonder; this reverence was most clearly visible to Bolton in Plato's Atlantis. He felt the livestreaming of the show was a postmodern element that enhanced the show's "powerful evocation of the Sublime".

Faiers compared Plato's Atlantis to Voss, in which McQueen had used marine life, especially shells, to explore animal life cycles and the tension between "vulnerability and protection". Judith Watt viewed the collection's bright patterns as a development of the thermal imaging designs from Voss. Textile curators Clarissa M. Esguerra and Michaela Hansen also identified a theme of protection running through the collection's prints. One pattern derived from moths suggested protective colouration, while those based on stingrays and jellyfish called to mind their toxic natural defences.

The snake imagery in the first half of the show has drawn comment, given the multi-faceted associations of serpents in mythology and art history. In some instances they represent sneakiness, evil and death; in others, strength, goodness and rebirth. Curators from the Los Angeles County Museum of Art (LACMA) Clarissa M. Esguerra and Michaela Hansen wrote that the collection recalled a "serpent's regenerative possibilities". Another LACMA curator, Danielle Whitfield, saw the opening film, in which Raquel Zimmerman is covered in snakes, as a possible reference to the Biblical narrative of Eve being tempted by the serpent. These authors also compared the nature-based elements in Plato's Atlantis to the work of sixteenth-century potter Bernard Palissy, known for his complex depictions of lizards, snakes, frogs, and plants in life-cast detail. They felt McQueen and Palissy shared an interest in nature that was "scientific in approach and creative in execution".

=== Regeneration and environmental message ===
The ocean represented a symbol of regeneration in the eyes of some critics. Wilcox saw the collection overall as a possible allusion to the story of the Biblical flood narrative, in which God floods the earth to cleanse it of corruption. In Plato's Altantis, she felt McQueen presented a vision of humanity liberated from the mechanical dystopia of modern life and returned to the primal ocean. Esguerra and Hansen compared McQueen's concerns about climate change to the work of photographer Andreas Gursky, who documented melting polar ice caps in a series of photographs in 2009. They thought the reference to the Titanic, in the shoes, was intended as a "cautionary tale" about environmental destruction and human overreach. Oceanic prints displayed "water's life-giving power", which they felt gave the collection an overall hopeful tone which "affirmed that from destruction, regrowth inevitably follows".

Andrea Bisevac compared the collection to the 1927 cosmic horror short story "The Colour Out of Space" by H. P. Lovecraft, arguing that they shared themes of existential dread and ecological fragility, demonstrating how artists reflect and influence discussion of environmental issues. In Lovecraft's story, an alien entity causes severe environmental damage after crash-landing in a field. Bisevac described this as symbolising the ecological impact of pollution, with the resulting "cosmic dread" serving as a means of inviting action on these problems. Meanwhile, Plato's Atlantis demonstrated that fashion could be used to raise awareness of ecological concerns, especially the need for sustainability in the fashion industry. McQueen's use of grotesque flourishes, such as the Xenomorph-inspired alien shoe, "mirrored the blend of beauty and terror" in Lovecraft's work. She concluded by arguing that although each work explores environmental issues, they present contrasting outcomes: Lovecraft's story is pessimistic and suggests catastrophes will escalate beyond human control", while McQueen's collection is optimistic and suggests humanity will learn to survive after integrating with nature.

In a retrospective of the collection written for Earth Day in 2020, Steff Yotka of Vogue considered the impact of collection's focus on nature and sustainability. She argued that Sarah Burton, who took over as creative director following McQueen's suicide, had lived up to these ideals, but felt that the rest of the industry had not. Yotka considered the runway cameras to be part of the environmentalist message, wondering if the projection of the audience was "a call to action or an assigning of blame?" She hoped that reflecting on Plato's Atlantis could inspire people to work toward a more environmentally sustainable future.

=== Human-animal hybridisation ===
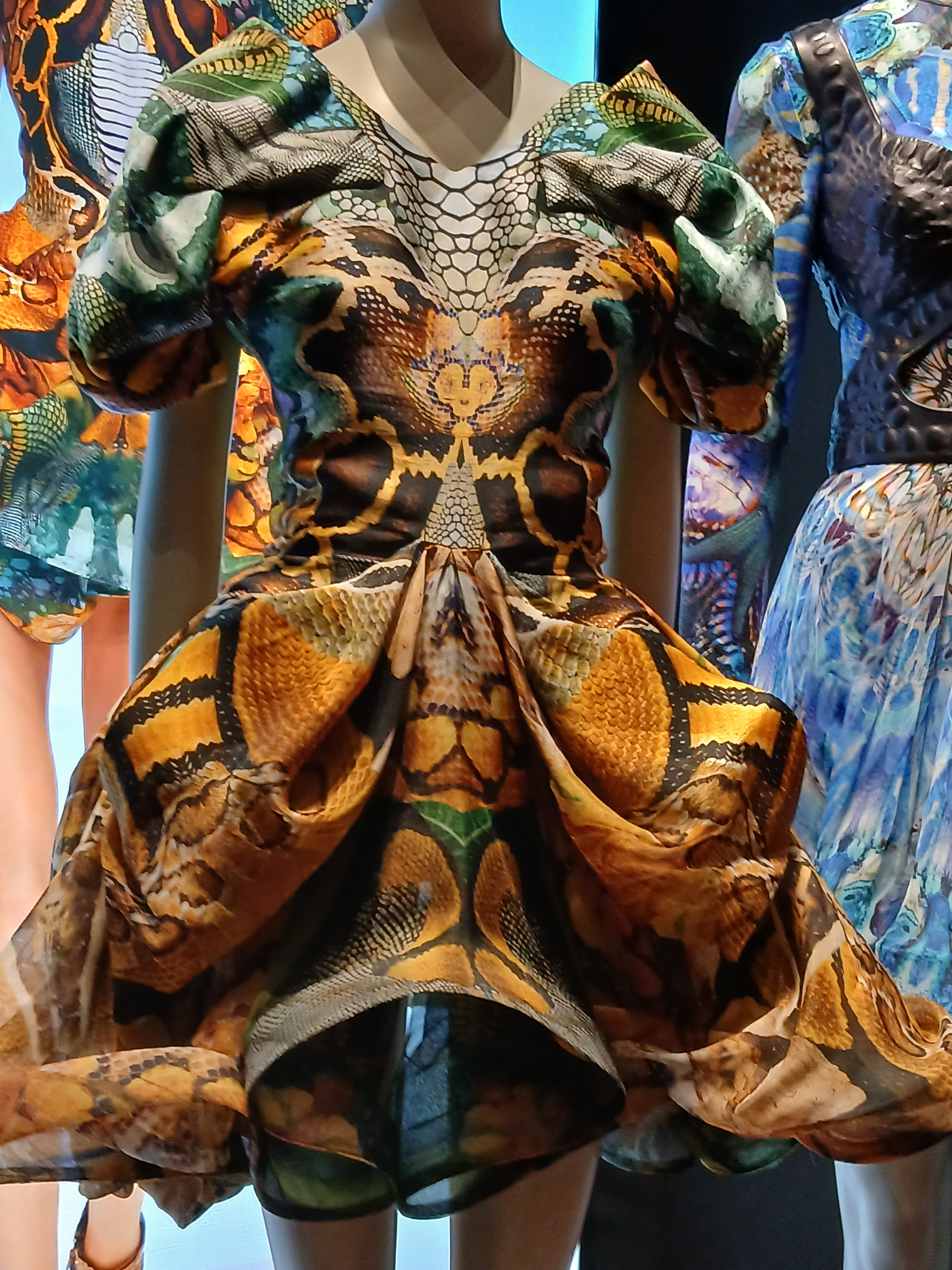
Variant of Look 4 at House of McQueen

Animal–human hybridisation was a recurring concept in McQueen's work, appearing most prominently in It's a Jungle Out There (Spring/Summer 1997) and Voss. The motif recurs in Plato's Atlantis, allowing McQueen to explore nature's evolutionary cycles through fashion. Author Judith Watt felt the collection was a gentler exploration of the concept compared to It's a Jungle, which was raw and provocative. Diana Villanueva Romero analysed McQueen's work from an ecofeminist perspective, identifying Plato's Atlantis as an evolution of McQueen's longstanding tendency to present women as female-animal hybrids. Initially he did so for aesthetic reasons, but gradually he began to use these transformations as social commentary, culminating in Plato's Atlantis, which used hybridisation to call attention to his environmental concerns.

Many scholars have viewed the hybridisation elements of Plato's Atlantis through the analytical lens of 'becoming', developed by the French academics Gilles Deleuze and Félix Guattari. The notion of becoming suggests that identity is a constant process of change and is not bound to fixed ideas. The way the collection presented humanity as merging with the natural world, through nature-based prints and inhuman silhouettes, is seen as McQueen's way of exploring becoming something other than human.

Gender theorist Stephen D. Seely explored the notion of becoming in an essay about fashion which enables the wearer to defy standard binary categories such as "human/animal". For Seely, McQueen's designs achieve this by incorporating aesthetics and materials from nature, such as in Plato's Atlantis, which combines animal patterns, nature imagery, and non-organic materials to depict a hybridised species which seemed to be from the deep past or the far future. Theorist Justyna Stępień wrote that the collection's designs seem to enable transformation in a way that suggested "that the process of becoming nonhuman appears to be very natural". She cited Neptune's Daughter as an example, writing that the fabric of the outfit seemed to merge with the body of the wearer to create "an entirely new assemblage" that moved in its own unique way. To her, the collection was a posthumanist interrogation of, and liberation from, normative body standards.

Theorist Mélissa Diaby Savané argued that McQueen's designs merged technology with nature to produce a uniquely modern "reflection on human identity" through hybridisation. She cited Plato's Atlantis as the apotheosis of his work in this respect, crediting the collection with altering trends for clothing and footwear with designs made to distort the classic symmetrical silhouette. The staging was suggestive of science fiction and a "mad scientist" concept that had surfaced in previous McQueen collections. In contrast to others who saw the transformation aspect as hopeful or optimistic, Savané saw the collection as a "victory of the artificial" and a degeneration to monstrousness. She did note that his silhouettes, despite their inhumanity, still made some attempt to adhere to fashion norms with their tailored waists, leading her to conclude that "McQueen was inspired by horror, but not to the point of completely deconstructing the fashion body as Rei Kawakubo did, among others".

Samuel Egea-Castañeda also used the collection as an example of McQueen's engagement with posthumanist ideas. As an example, he cited the protruding fin hairstyles in the latter half of the show, which present a "macrocephalic aspect allegedly typical of intellectually superior aliens". In combination with the androgynous-seeming facial prosthetics, he felt this was indicative of a posthuman "blurring of boundaries" resulting from use of technology. He also cited McQueen's decision to place humanity on a continuum with the nonhuman as a means of raising environmental awareness.

Massimiliano Ciammaichella and Barbara Pasa jointly analysed the patterns and shapes of selected designs from Plato's Atlantis, reconstructing some as 3D models, in order to analyse how they contributed to "the process of constructing personal identity and gender".

=== As McQueen's final collection ===
Plato's Atlantis is often discussed in light of its status as McQueen's final fully-realised mainline collection. He committed suicide in February 2010 following years of mental health issues, substance use, and an escalating obsession with death. At the time of his death, he was working on his final collection, posthumously titled Angels and Demons (Autumn/Winter 2010). It was left unfinished, with sixteen outfits in various stages of completion. (Note: Some sources incorrectly report fifteen.)

McQueen had said that his previous collection, The Horn of Plenty (Autumn/Winter 2009), was his last as a young man. Wilcox noted that this made Plato's Atlantis both his first and last as a grown man. She felt the collection's heavy identification with water, symbolically associated with peril and death but also freedom and life, resembled McQueen's tumultuous yet creatively productive experience in the fashion industry. Faiers noted the large amount of technical skill required for the collection's complex designs, and felt that it would not have been possible without its predecessor. He described The Horn of Plenty, which parodied fashion history and McQueen's own previous work, as a stage in which the designer "discarded the 'skins' of his previous collections" to create the new ideas seen in Plato's Atlantis.

Theorist Ana Honigman considered Plato's Atlantis a "disarmingly optimistic" collection when viewed in light of his subsequent suicide. She felt the iridescent scales of the final look resembled soap bubbles, suggesting impermanence. Alexander McQueen archivist John Matheson described Plato's Atlantis as a "last burst of life" for McQueen. Aria Darcella in Fashionista wondered how the innovations of Plato's Atlantis – livestreaming, digital technology, and his relationship with Lady Gaga – might have influenced McQueen's future career, had he lived.

== Legacy ==
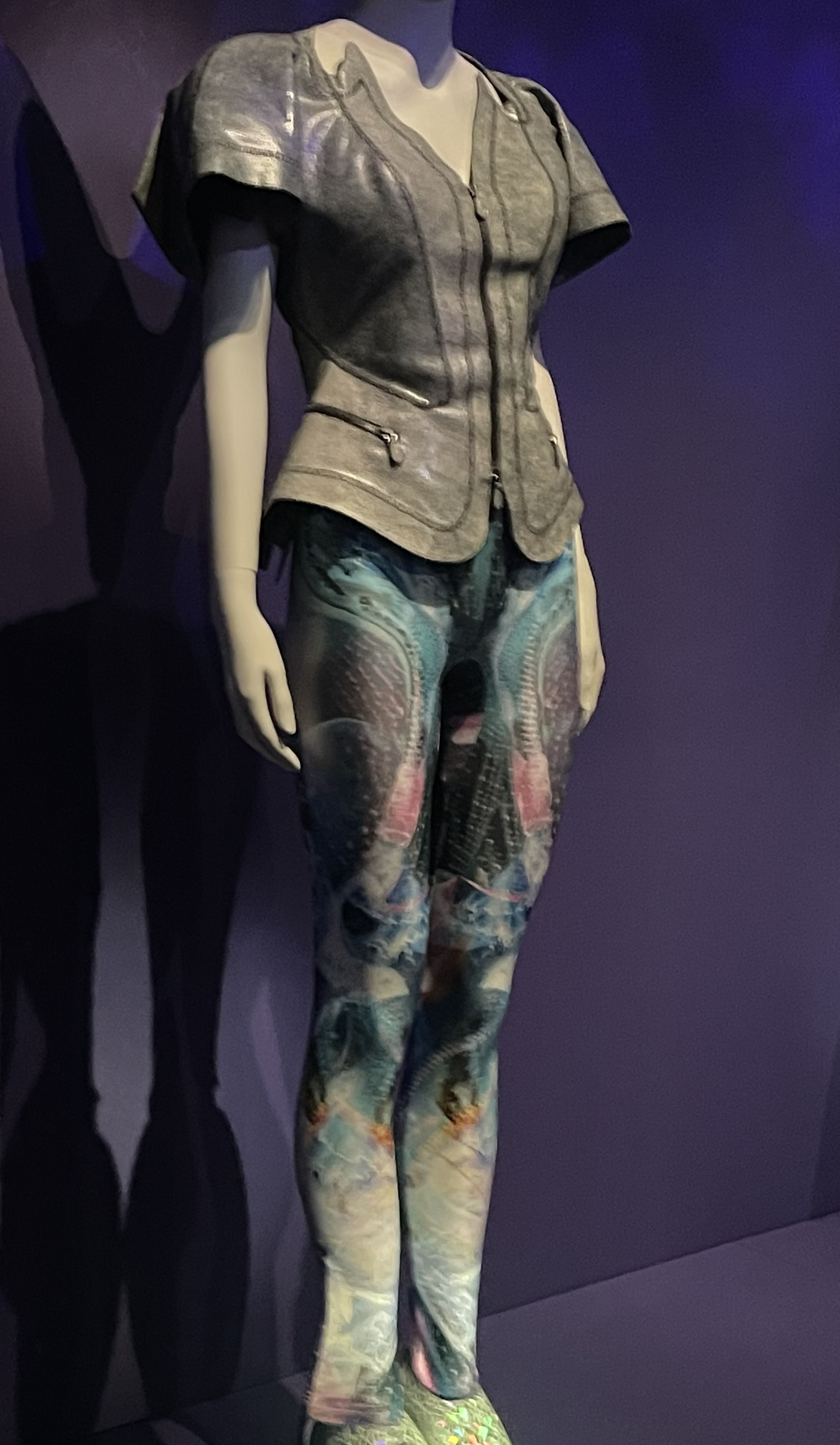
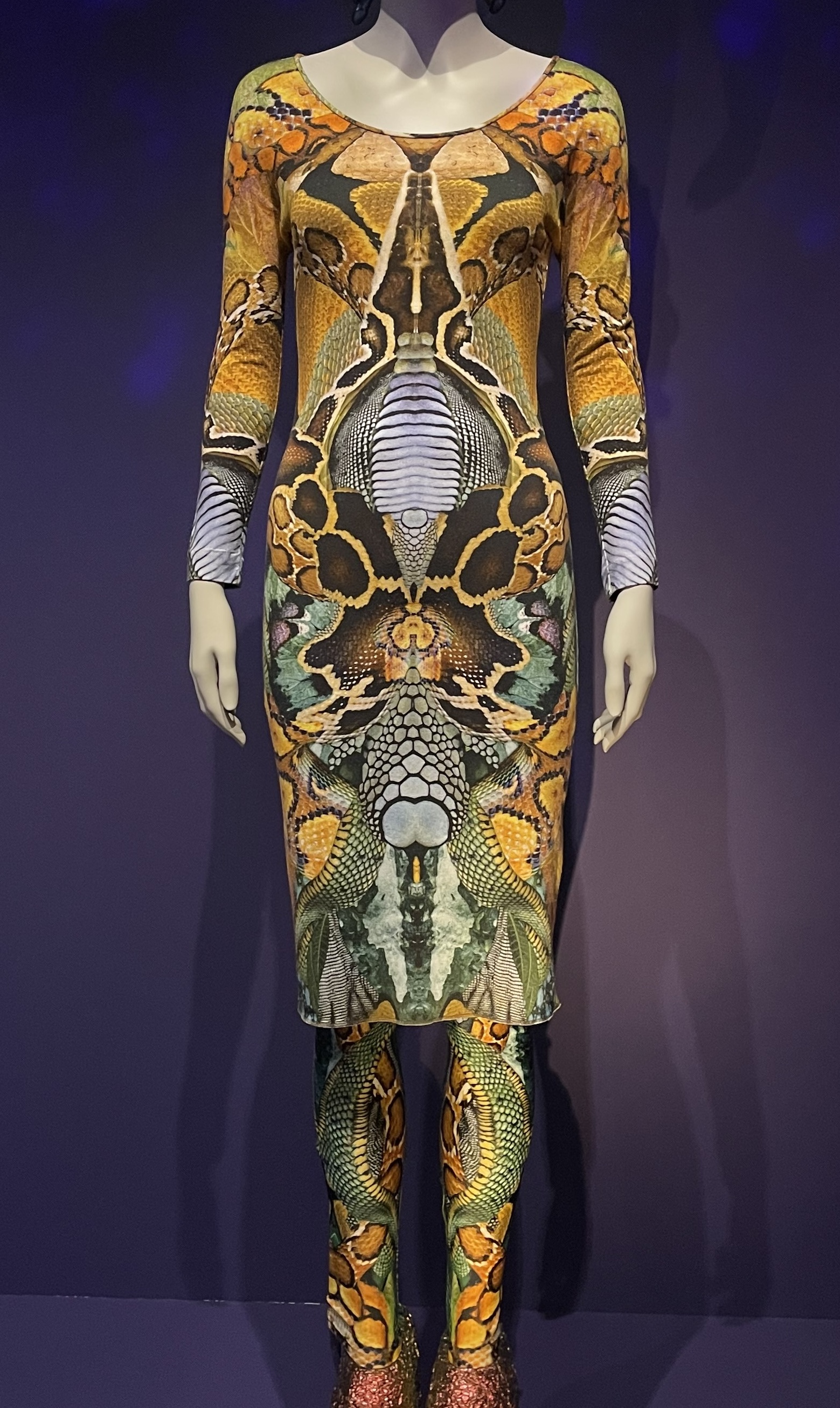
Items from retail collection presented at Lee Alexander McQueen: Mind, Mythos, Muse (2022)

Beginning with Natural Dis-tinction and continuing through Plato's Atlantis, McQueen is credited with popularising the use of digitally-engineered prints in fashion.

In March 2026, the soundtrack for the collection was released digitally and on vinyl. In April that year, John Gosling collaborated with the London Contemporary Orchestra for "Unnatural Harmony: Sounds of Lee Alexander McQueen", which featured 17 songs from McQueen's life and the soundtracks of his shows. The show is named in honour of the theme of Plato's Atlantis.

=== Celebrity wear and editorials ===
For the "Bad Romance" music video, released November 2009, Lady Gaga wore the opalescent "Neptune's Daughter" outfit that closed the Plato's Atlantis show, including the matching armadillo shoes. The video for her 2011 single "Born This Way" was visually influenced by the symmetrical prints and facial prosthetics that featured in Plato's Atlantis. In a 2011 episode of RuPaul's Drag Race, Yara Sofia wore a replica of the "Neptune's Daughter" outfit.

The collection's printed minidresses were popular with celebrities, especially as red carpet attire. Camilla Belle wore one of the underwater looks to the November 2009 premiere of the film 2012. Anna Paquin wore one of the reptile-print cocktail dresses for the Screen Actors Guild Awards in January 2010. McQueen's friends Naomi Campbell, Kate Moss and Annabelle Neilson wore minidresses from the collection together to a charity event in March 2010 as a tribute to him. Other celebrities known to have worn the dresses include Daphne Guinness, Noot Seear, Salma Hayek, and Lily Cole. Josh Olins photographed one of the reptile minidresses for Vogue.

=== Exhibitions and ownership ===
Items from Plato's Atlantis, especially the armadillo shoes, have appeared in various museum exhibitions, and are owned by museums and celebrities.

Several ensembles appeared in Alexander McQueen: Savage Beauty, a retrospective exhibition of McQueen's designs originally staged at the Metropolitan Museum of Art (the Met) in 2011. Two of the tailored grey and blue minidresses were placed in the Romantic Mind section, which explored McQueen's tailoring and construction. The remainder formed the focus of the Romantic Naturalism section, which concerned McQueen's interest in the natural world. These included two snakeskin-print minidresses, a moth-print minidress with leather harness, three jellyfish-print minidresses with sequins, all with shoes from the collection, and the "Neptune's Daughter" ensemble with dress, leggings, and matching armadillo shoes. The film of Zimmerman from the runway show was projected onto the ceiling in this area. An additional pair of armadillo shoes was placed in the Cabinet of Curiosities section with other accessories.

The collection was a feature in #techstyle, a 2016 exhibition at the Museum of Fine Arts in Boston that considered clothing that acts as wearable technology. A reptile-print minidress owned by the The Museum at FIT appeared in their 2017 exhibition Force of Nature, while a copy owned by the Victoria and Albert Museum appeared in their 2021 exhibition Silk: Fibre, Fabric and Fashion. Five ensembles owned by the Los Angeles County Museum of Art appeared in their exhibition Lee Alexander McQueen: Mind, Mythos, Muse, originally staged in 2022: several digitally-printed minidresses, some with leggings, as well as a leather harness and pair of shoes. Two aquatic minidresses from the Met's collection appeared in their 2024 exhibition Sleeping Beauties: Reawakening Fashion. The Met also owns a reptile-print minidress.

Designed as showpieces, the armadillo shoes were never commercially produced, although many were sold to private buyers following the show. As of 2011, the Alexander McQueen brand archive in London retained ownership of at least five pairs, including the pair covered with iridescent scales worn in the final outfit of the show. (Note: The others include a beige python-skin pair from Look 2; a black pair from either Look 3 or 6; a black pair possibly from Look 20; and an olive-green python-skin pair from an unidentified look.) The The Met owns two pairs, one made from turquoise shagreen and another in black leather with metal accents. Musician Kelis owns a nude pair, which she was seen wearing in January 2010. Until September 2026, Naomi Campbell owned a custom version of Look 1, a multi-coloured snakeskin dress with matching armadillo shoes. The outfit was sold at auction for $1,586,000, the highest known auction price for a McQueen ensemble.

== Bibliography ==
=== Audio-visual media ===
- Knight, Nick (6 October 2009). "Interview: Alexander McQueen on Plato's Atlantis". SHOWstudio.

=== Books ===
- Anthony, Clare (2013). Art of the Handbag: Crazy Beautiful Bags. New York City: Race Point Publishing. ISBN 978-1-62788-081-7.
- Antonelli, Paola; Millar Fisher, Michelle (2017). Items: Is Fashion Modern?. New York City: The Museum of Modern Art. ISBN 978-1-63345-036-3. OCLC 973794681.
- Bolton, Andrew (2011). Alexander McQueen: Savage Beauty. New York City: Metropolitan Museum of Art. ISBN 978-1-58839-412-5. OCLC 687693871.
  - Frankel, Susannah. Introduction. In Bolton (2011), pp. 17–27.
- Bolton, Andrew (2024). Sleeping Beauties: Reawakening Fashion. New York City: Metropolitan Museum of Art. ISBN 978-1-58839-777-5.
- Crewe, Louise (2017). The Geographies of Fashion: Consumption, Space, and Value. London: Bloomsbury Publishing. ISBN 978-1-4725-8958-3.
- Esguerra, Clarissa M.; Hansen, Michaela (2022). Lee Alexander McQueen: Mind, Mythos, Muse. New York City: Delmonico Books. ISBN 1-63681-018-7. OCLC 1289986708.
- Fairer, Robert; Wilcox, Claire (2016). Alexander McQueen: Unseen. New Haven, Connecticut: Yale University Press. ISBN 0-300-22267-X. OCLC 946216643.
- Fox, Chloe (2012). Vogue On: Alexander McQueen. Vogue on Designers. London: Quadrille Publishing. ISBN 1849491135. OCLC 828766756.
- Geczy, Adam; Karaminas, Vicki (2019). Fashion Installation: Body, Space, and Performance. London: Bloomsbury Visual Arts. ISBN 978-1-350-03253-8.
- Gleason, Katherine (2012). Alexander McQueen: Evolution. New York City: Race Point Publishing. ISBN 978-1-61058-837-9. OCLC 783147416.
- Gray, Sally; Rutnam, Anisha (2014). "Her Own Real Thing: Lady Gaga and the Haus of Fashion". In Iddon, Martin; Marshall, Melanie L. (eds.). Lady Gaga and Popular Music: Performing Gender, Fashion, and Culture. Routledge Studies in Popular Music. New York City: Routledge. ISBN 978-1-134-07987-2.
- Halliday, Rebecca (2022). The Fashion Show Goes Live: Exclusive and Mediatized Performance. London: Bloomsbury Publishing. ISBN 978-1-350-22637-1.
- Hill, Colleen (2016). Fairy Tale Fashion. New Haven: Yale University Press. ISBN 978-0-300-21802-2. OCLC 920017513.
- Homer, Karen (2023). Little Book of Alexander McQueen: The Story of the Iconic Brand. London: Welbeck Publishing Group. ISBN 978-1-80279-270-6.
- Honigman, Ana Finel (2021). What Alexander McQueen Can Teach You About Fashion. London: Frances Lincoln. ISBN 978-0-7112-5906-5.
- Khan, Nathalie (2013). "Fashion as Mythology: Considering the Legacy of Alexander McQueen". In Bruzzi, Stella; Gibson, Pamela Church (eds.). Fashion Cultures Revisited. London: Routledge. pp. 261–271. ISBN 978-0-415-68005-9.
- Knox, Kristin (2010). Alexander McQueen: Genius of a Generation. London: A&C Black. ISBN 978-1-4081-3223-4. OCLC 794296806.
- O'Flaherty, Mark C. (2023). "John Matheson". Narrative Thread: Conversations on Fashion Collections. London: Bloomsbury Visual Arts. pp. 66–85. ISBN 978-1-350-28767-9.
- Paić, Žarko (2022). Paić, Žarko (ed.). Fashion Theory and the Visual Semiotics of the Body. Newcastle Upon Tyne: Cambridge Scholars Publishing. ISBN 978-1-5275-8583-6.
- Thomas, Dana (2015). Gods and Kings: The Rise and Fall of Alexander McQueen and John Galliano. New York City: Penguin Publishing. ISBN 978-1-101-61795-3. OCLC 951153602.
- Watt, Judith (2012). Alexander McQueen: The Life and the Legacy. New York City: Harper Design. ISBN 978-1-84796-085-6. OCLC 892706946.
- Wilcox, Claire, ed. (2015). Alexander McQueen. New York City: Abrams Books. ISBN 978-1-4197-1723-9. OCLC 891618596.
  - Bethune, Kate. "Encyclopedia of Collections". In Wilcox (2015), pp. 303–326.
  - Brown, Susanna. "Nightmares and Dreams". In Wilcox (2015), pp. 284–301.
  - Faiers, Jonathan. "Nature Boy". In Wilcox (2015), pp. 123–137.
  - Miller, Janice. "Making-Up". In Wilcox (2015), pp. 234–241.
  - Persson, Helen. "Walking Out". In Wilcox (2015), pp. 110–115.
  - Spooner, Catherine. "A Gothic Mind". In Wilcox (2015), pp. 141–158.
  - Wilcox, Claire. "Edward Scissorhands". In Wilcox (2015), pp. 25–33.
  - Wilcox, Claire. "Plato's Atlantis: Anatomy of a Collection". In Wilcox (2015), pp. 83–103.
- Wilson, Andrew (2015). Alexander McQueen: Blood Beneath the Skin. New York City: Simon and Schuster. ISBN 978-1-4767-7674-3. OCLC 1310585849.

=== Periodicals ===
- Bisevac, Andjela (2024). "Environmental Elegies in Art and Fashion". Journal of the Science of Design. 8 (2): 29–36. doi:10.11247/jsd.8.2_2_29.
- Ciammaichella, Massimiliano; Pasa, Barbara (October 2025). "Representations of Embodied Identities in the Design Universe of Lee Alexander McQueen". Ékphrasis. Franco Angeli: 2585–2608. doi:10.3280/oa-1430-c889. ISBN 978-88-351-8241-2.
- Egea-Castañeda, Samuel (2023). "The Posthuman Turn in The Fashion Industry: On Human Animals & Cyborgs through Alexander McQueen's Fashion Shows". In Conejero Magro, Luis Javier; Blanco García, Cristina; Méndez Márquez, Laura; Ruiz-Morgan, Jennifer (eds.). Bridging Cultures: English and American Studies in Spain (PDF). Cáceres: University of Extremadura. pp. 25–30. ISBN 978-84-9127-212-0.
- Fennetaux, Ariane (Autumn 2018). "Birds of a Feather: Alexander McQueen's Victorian Bestiary". Cahiers victoriens et édouardiens (in French) (88). doi:10.4000/cve.4328. ISSN 0220-5610.
- Jakob, Isabel Formica (18 November 2021). "On Mental Health, Lee Alexander McQueen, and Slow Fashion". The Fashion Studies Journal (9).
- Lamb, Brittany (2015). "The Federal Government's Hand-Me-Downs: The Possibility of Protecting Fashion at the State Level". Columbia Law Review. 115 (1): 127–164. ISSN 0010-1958.
- McColm, Donna, ed. (January–February 2023). "Alexander McQueen: Mind, Mythos, Muse". NGV Magazine. No. 38.
  - Faiers, Jonathan. "Re-make/Re-model". In McColm (2023), pp. 26–32.
  - Mallia-Valjan, Imogen. "Capturing the Animal Kingdom". In McColm (2023), p. 26.
  - Whitfield, Danielle. "Plato's Atlantis". In McColm (2023), p. 25.
- Mora, Juliana Luna; Berry, Jess (2 September 2022). "Creative Direction Succession in Luxury Fashion: The Illusion of Immortality at Chanel and Alexander McQueen". Luxury. 9 (2–3): 117–140. doi:10.1080/20511817.2022.2194039. ISSN 2051-1817.
- Ojala, Aino Elina; Pouta, Emmi; Gowrishankar, Ramyah (4 March 2025). "Unveiling Kinetic Expression: Exploring Design Variables and Processes for Dynamic Woven Textiles". Proceedings of the Nineteenth International Conference on Tangible, Embedded, and Embodied Interaction. New York, NY, USA: ACM: 1–17. doi:10.1145/3689050.3704950.
- Savané, Mélissa Diaby (20 June 2021). "The fantasy of ugliness in Alexander McQueen collections (1992–2009): How did literature and the visual arts inspire Alexander McQueen to merge sex and horror in his own art form?". Revista 2i: Estudos de Identidade e Intermedialidade. 3 (3): 95–108. doi:10.21814/2i.3157. ISSN 2184-7010. Archived from the original on 23 October 2023.
- Seely, Stephen D. (2013). "How Do You Dress a Body Without Organs?: Affective Fashion and Nonhuman Becoming". Women's Studies Quarterly. 41 (1): 247–265. doi:10.1353/wsq.2013.0069. ISSN 1934-1520.
- Steele, Valerie (September 2013). "Exhibition review: Alexander McQueen: Savage Beauty". Fashion Theory. 17 (4): 419–430. doi:10.2752/175174113X13673474643129. ISSN 1362-704X.
- Stępień, Justyna (3 July 2017). "'Savage Beauties'. Alexander McQueen's Performance of Posthuman Bodies". International Journal of Performance Arts and Digital Media. 13 (2): 170–182. doi:10.1080/14794713.2017.1345584. ISSN 1479-4713.
- Uhlirova, Marketa (2013). "100 Years of the Fashion Film: Frameworks and Histories". Fashion Theory. 17 (2): 137–157. doi:10.2752/175174113X13541091797562. ISSN 1362-704X.
- Villanueva Romero, Diana (December 2013). ""Savage Beauty": representations of women as animals in PETA's campaigns and Alexander McQueen's fashion shows". Feminismo/s (22): 147–175. doi:10.14198/fem.2013.22.09. hdl:10045/39796. ISSN 1696-8166. Archived from the original on 12 April 2023.
