= Armadillo shoe =

2010 platform shoe by Alexander McQueen

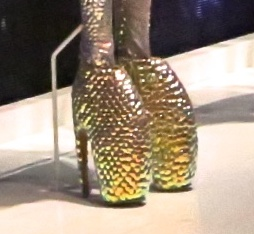
Side view of an armadillo shoe, covered in iridescent paillettes made to look like scales, from the show's final outfit, "Neptune's Daughter"

The armadillo shoe (alternately armadillo heel or armadillo boot) is a high fashion platform shoe created by British fashion designer Alexander McQueen for McQueen's final collection, Plato's Atlantis (Spring/Summer 2010). Only 24 pairs exist: 21 were made during the initial production in 2009, and three were made in 2015 for a charity auction. The shoes are named for their unusual convex curved shape, said to resemble an armadillo. Each pair is approximately 12 inches (30 cm) from top to sole, with a 9-inch (23 cm) stiletto heel; this extreme height caused some models to refuse to walk in the Plato's Atlantis show. American singer Lady Gaga famously wore the shoes in several public appearances, including the music video for her 2009 single "Bad Romance".

Critical response to the armadillo heels was extensive, both immediately following the show and in retrospect. They are considered iconic in the context of the Plato's Atlantis show, McQueen's body of work, and in fashion history in general. Critics have referred to them as both grotesque and beautiful, sometimes in the same review. Much of the negative criticism focused on the height of the heel, which has been viewed as impractical, even unsafe. Other writers have explored the shoes as artistic statements. Pairs of armadillo heels have been featured in museum exhibitions, most prominently in the McQueen retrospective Alexander McQueen: Savage Beauty, first shown at the Metropolitan Museum of Art in New York City in 2011.

== Background ==
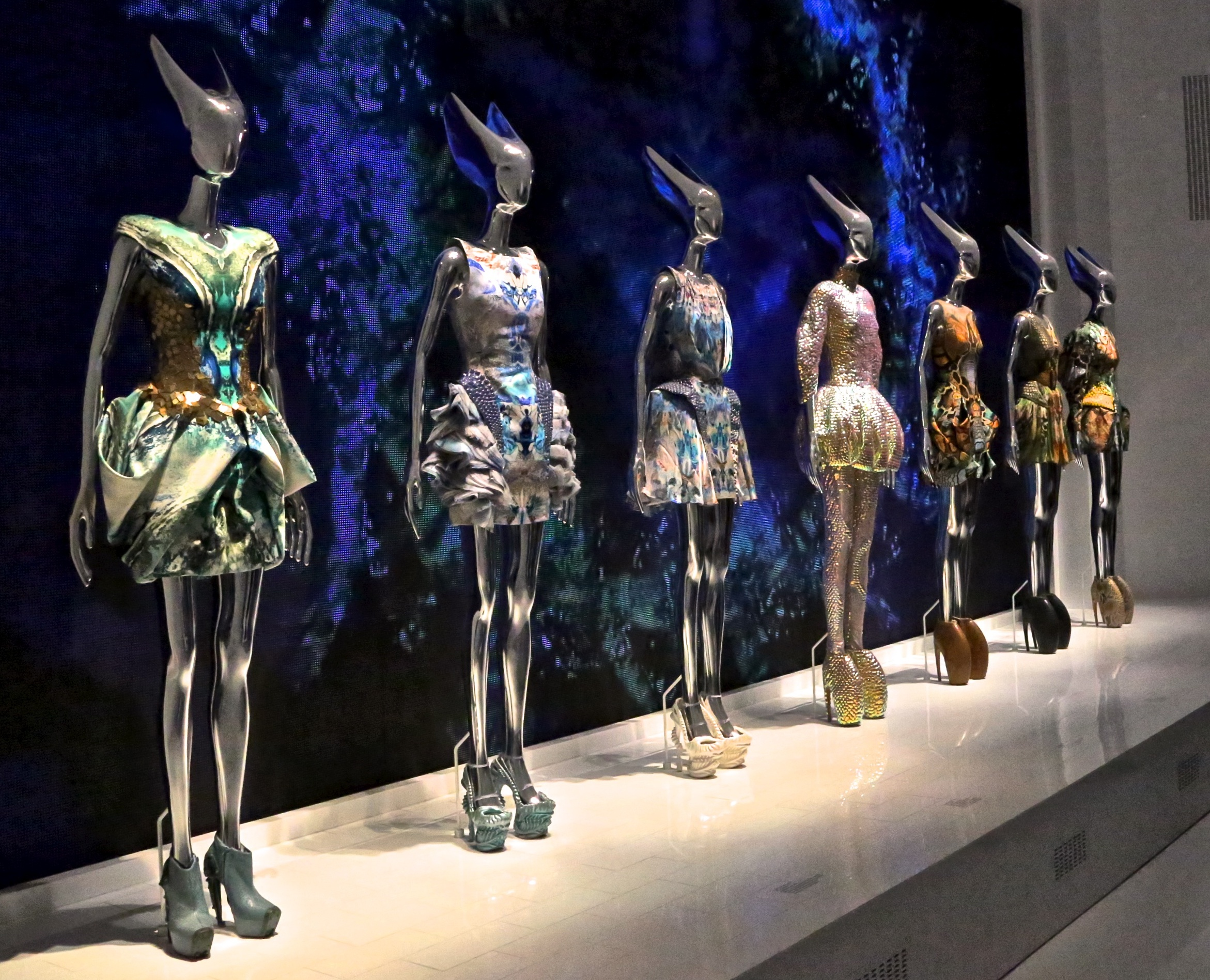
Clothing from Plato's Atlantis on display at Alexander McQueen: Savage Beauty, Victoria and Albert Museum, 2015

British fashion designer Alexander McQueen was known for his imaginative, sometimes controversial designs, and dramatic fashion shows. During his nearly twenty-year career, he explored a broad range of ideas and themes, including historicism, romanticism, femininity, sexuality, and death. He had designed extreme footwear for previous collections, including high platform shoes inspired by the Japanese geta and Venetian chopine for his Spring/Summer 2008 collection, La Dame Bleue, and houndstooth platforms for Autumn/Winter 2009, The Horn of Plenty.

For his Spring/Summer 2010 collection, Plato's Atlantis, McQueen took inspiration from climate change and Charles Darwin's theory of evolution, envisioning a world where humans evolved to survive underwater after global flooding. The collection was presented on the catwalk at Paris Fashion Week on 6 October 2009. The show began with designs that used earth tones and digitally printed animal skin patterns to invoke the appearance of land animals, and gradually transitioned into designs featuring abstract prints in aqua and blue, suggesting that the models were adapting to an increasingly submerged planet. The show's final outfit, entitled "Neptune's Daughter", was covered entirely in enormous blue-green opalescent sequins, including the matching armadillo shoes. The outfit represented the final stage of humanity's adaptation to an underwater environment. It was worn on the runway by Polina Kasina, who had long been McQueen's fit model. Plato's Atlantis was McQueen's final fully realised collection; he committed suicide in 2010.

== Design ==
Sketch showing the interior construction of the armadillo boot, 2009

The armadillo shoes are almost 12 inches (30 cm) from top to sole, with a 9-inch (23 cm) spike heel. The vertical body of the shoe is shaped in a convex curve, which has been variously compared to the silhouette of an armadillo, lobster claw, or animal hoof. Their shape is generally regarded as unique in high fashion, although museum curator Helen Persson found a precedent in the shape of Persian riding boots of the 16th century.

The shoe hides the entire foot from ankle to toe, creating the illusion that the wearer is walking en pointe in the manner of a ballerina. In actuality the ball of the foot rests at an angle on a concealed platform, with a small bulge above the toe to facilitate lifting the heavy shoe to walk. Each pair is decorated to match the theme of the collection: some are covered with animal skin such as python skin or shagreen (rawhide from the cowtail stingray), while others have iridescent paillettes resembling scales.

== History ==
=== Development and runway show ===
McQueen took his inspiration for the armadillo shoes from the work of pop artist Allen Jones and fashion designer Leigh Bowery, as well as the biomechanical art of H. R. Giger, known for visually developing the Alien movies. There is also a resemblance to a pair of shoes seen in the music video for the 1975 song "White Punks on Dope" by The Tubes.

McQueen worked with shoe designer Georgina Goodman to realise the concept. Each pair was hand-carved from wood in Italy. According to The Daily Beast, the complex manufacturing process "spanned five days and involved 30 people, using material from three suppliers and passing through three factories". The inner lining and outer shell were shaped separately and fitted together; each section required two zippers for access. For the original collection, 21 pairs were made, 20 of which were worn during the Plato's Atlantis October 2009 fashion show.

The unusual shape made walking in the shoes notoriously difficult for most. The show's producer, Sam Gainsbury, tested them the night before the show and found walking impossible. When she complained of this to McQueen and suggested the models were at risk of falling, the designer responded, "If they fall, they fall." In the end, models Abbey Lee Kershaw, Natasha Poly and Sasha Pivovarova all declined to walk in Plato's Atlantis because of their concerns that the heels were too high to be safe. Kershaw had already torn a ligament in her knee after a fall in September 2008. In the 2018 documentary McQueen model Magdalena Frąckowiak said that she found walking in them "really frightening". Despite these concerns, no models fell at the show, which was regarded as "miraculous" by the fashion press. Shortly after the Plato's Atlantis show, staffers from British Vogue tested the shoes and found them difficult to walk in. Months after the show, McQueen confirmed in an interview with trade journal Women's Wear Daily that he had never tested the armadillos personally. He made it clear that he was far less concerned with practicality than with visual effect, saying elsewhere, "The world needs fantasy, not reality. We have enough reality today."

=== Celebrity wear ===
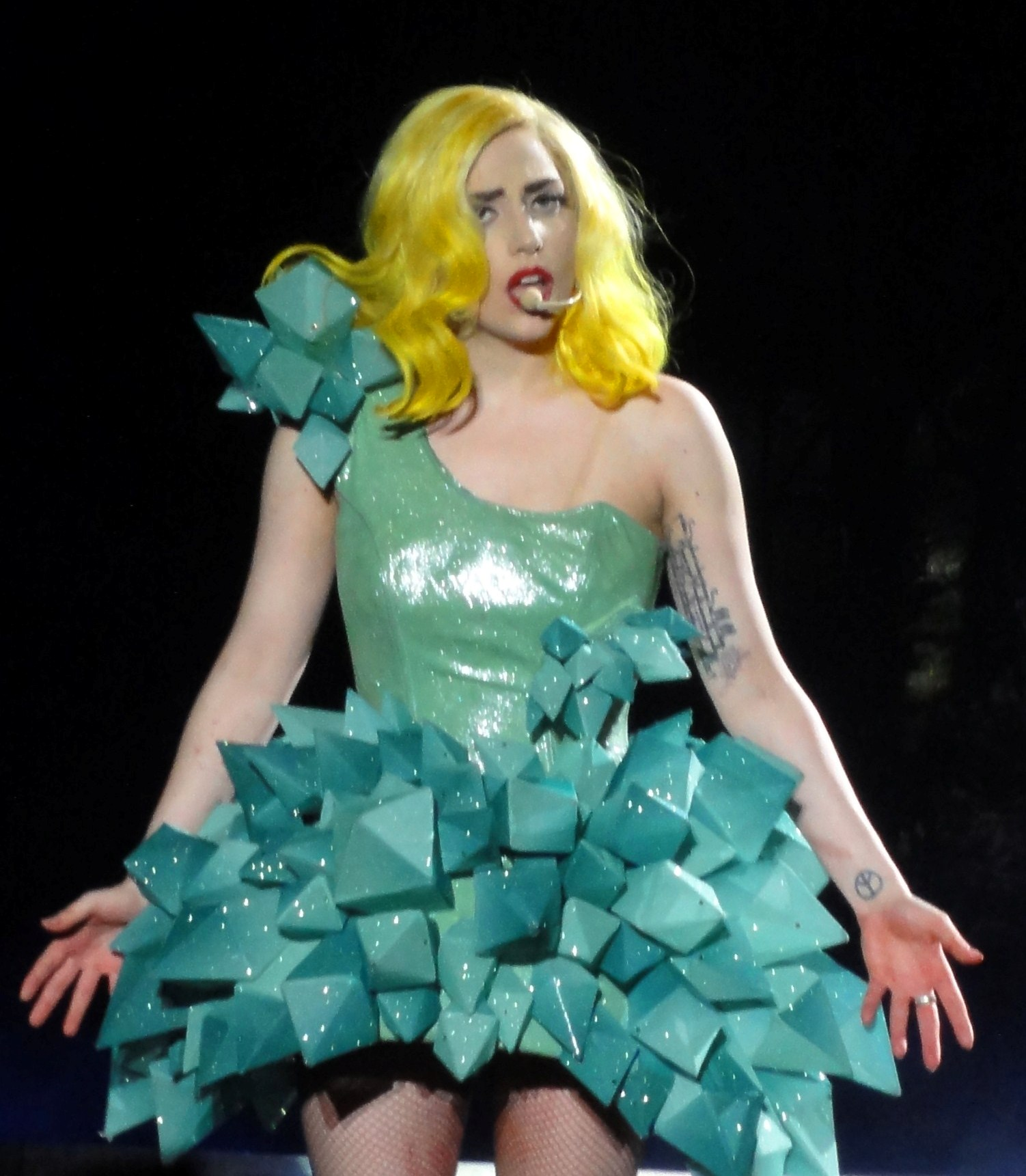
Lady Gaga on The Monster Ball Tour in 2010

Celebrities have worn armadillo heels for red carpet appearances and photoshoots. The first of these was in November 2009, when British socialite Daphne Guinness wore a pair in nude-coloured leather and reported that they were "surprisingly comfortable". Guinness also wore a pair of snakeskin armadillo boots in a shoot for Vogue Italia in February 2010. American singer Kelis wore another nude leather pair on the red carpet in January 2010. American actress Demi Moore wore a tan pair on the April 2010 cover of Harper's Bazaar.

American singer Lady Gaga, who became a friend of McQueen's shortly before his suicide, premiered her 2009 single "Bad Romance" at the Plato's Atlantis show. For the single's music video, released November 2009, Gaga wore the opalescent "Neptune's Daughter" outfit that closed the Plato's Atlantis show, including the matching armadillo shoes. Gaga wore a pair of armadillo heels in python skin when she arrived at the MTV Video Music Awards in September 2010; she described this look in 2018 as the top outfit of her career. Later that month, she wore the same pair with a dress made of hair for a performance at The Oak Room at New York's Plaza Hotel. In 2016 Gaga was the guest editor for the Spring preview issue of V magazine, which featured a photoshoot of herself and Guinness wearing armadillo heels.

== Reception and cultural legacy ==
Critical reaction to the armadillo shoes was immediate and polarised. Many reviewers described them as both grotesque and beautiful in the same breath. They were particularly noted for their complete visual departure from the natural structure of the human foot. Critics often described the models as looking alien, monstrous, or inhuman while wearing them. They are considered an iconic element of the Plato's Atlantis collection and of McQueen's body of work more broadly. In 2012, British Vogue called them one of the 20 all-time most iconic shoes.

Although there was some criticism of their appearance, much of the negative reaction centered on the perceived impracticality of walking in the armadillo heels. Some critics labelled the impractical design a feminist issue, pointing out that female models were being expected to walk in extreme heels designed by a man. Costume design professor Deborah Bell wrote that they transformed the model into a "hunted victim".

Critics viewing them in retrospect have described their effect on high fashion footwear as groundbreaking. By 2010, fashion journalists were crediting the armadillo heels as one source of a trend towards extreme high heels both on the runway and in everyday fashion. In 2018, Aria Darcella argued in Fashionista that "never in fashion has a shoe eclipsed the rest of a collection". Later that year, in an article that celebrated deliberately unappealing fashion, The Paris Review called them "aggressively ugly" while noting that they had "forever change[d] footwear." Writing for the American edition of Vogue in 2020, Steff Yotka described them as "the progenitor of our obsession with really quite bizarre footwear".

For the Spring/Summer 2024 Alexander McQueen pre-collection, the brand introduced a line of shoes with curved heels inspired by the shape of the armadillo shoes.

=== Ownership and museum appearances ===
There is no diamond, no award, nothing I ever wanted more than a memory of my brief friendship with McQueen. I am sad every day that I enter my closet, knowing he is not here anymore to dazzle the world with his beautiful, dark, limitless, brave mind. These shoes are the only tangible piece I have left of our work together.

— Lady Gaga, letter to V magazine after being given the shoes, 2015

Designed as showpieces, the shoes were never commercially produced, although many were sold to private buyers following the show. As of 2011, the Alexander McQueen brand archive in London retained ownership of at least five pairs, including the pair covered with iridescent scales worn in the final outfit of the show. (Note: The others include a beige python-skin pair from Look 2; a black pair from either Look 3 or 6; a black pair possibly from Look 20; and an olive-green python-skin pair from an unidentified look.) The Metropolitan Museum of Art (The Met) in New York City owns two pairs, one made from turquoise shagreen and another in black leather with metal accents. Kelis owns the nude pair she was seen wearing in January 2010. Until September 2026, Naomi Campbell owned the multi-coloured snakeskin pair from Look 1, as well as its matching dress. The outfit was sold at auction for $1,586,000, the highest known auction price for a McQueen ensemble.

Three brand-new pairs were created in 2015 by McQueen's label in partnership with Christie's auction house, which sold them to raise money for the UNICEF 2015 Nepal earthquake relief fund. Initially expected to sell for US$10–15,000 all together, they eventually sold for a combined total of $295,000. All three pairs were sold to American actor Taylor Kinney, who gifted them to Lady Gaga, then his fiancée.

Since their debut, armadillo shoes have been featured in a number of museum exhibitions. Several pairs from the Alexander McQueen archive were featured at Alexander McQueen: Savage Beauty, a retrospective exhibition of McQueen's work, which appeared at The Met in 2011 and the Victoria and Albert Museum (V&A) of London in 2015. The shoes also appeared in the 2015 V&A exhibition Shoes: Pleasure and Pain. In 2017, Kelis lent her pair to the Museum of Modern Art for a fashion exhibition entitled Items: Is Fashion Modern? In 2019 Kerry Taylor Auctions reported selling a pair of armadillo heels in turquoise shagreen for £60,000; the buyer was not specified. For the 2022 exhibition Lee Alexander McQueen: Mind, Mythos, Muse, first shown at the Los Angeles County Museum of Art, designer Michael Schmidt was commissioned to make several replica pairs from various materials, including candy wrappers, broken CDs, and Swarovski crystals. Campbell lent her pair to the 2024 V&A exhibition Naomi: In Fashion.

== Analysis ==
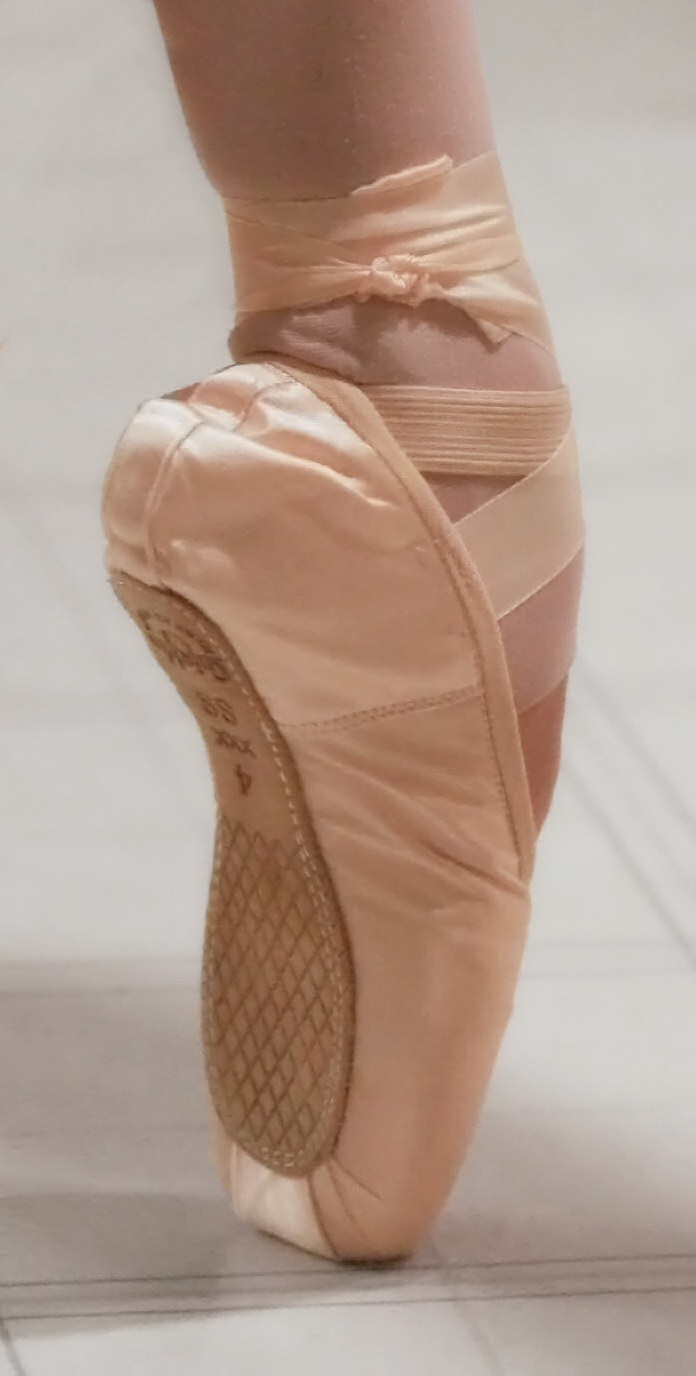
A relevé or rise en pointe in a pointe shoe

Some writers have explored the artistic and cultural implications of the armadillo heels. Their existence as impractical but visually striking footwear has been used to support the argument that fashion is an art form in its own right. Writing for The New York Times in 2009, Amanda Fortini connected their immense height to the so-called hemline theory, which posits that fashion designs tend to reflect the state of the economy. She suggested that the extreme heels on the armadillo boots reflected an attempt to "lift our collective spirits" given the impact of the Great Recession of 2008. Fashion historians Beth Dincuff Charleston and Francesca Granata have each argued, in 2010 and 2017 respectively, that the shoes function closer to medical or corrective devices than footwear.

Mass media theorist Paul Hegarty discussed Lady Gaga's use of the armadillo heels in her "Bad Romance" video as a combination of dominance and submission: their height restricts Gaga's movement, indicating submissiveness, but her ability to walk in them indicates a subversive kind of dominance. In this way, the video "looks at complicity with controls as a way of surmounting them". In 2014 Isabelle Szmigin and Maria Piacentini discussed them as an example of how high fashion concepts – in this case, extremely high heels – are absorbed into popular culture and then spread to individuals, affecting their desires and behaviour as consumers.

Shahidha Bari, professor of fashion cultures, described them in 2020 as a parody of a ballerina's pointe shoes: "gorgeous and cruel, but it also makes explicit the mercilessness of the pointe shoe". Philosopher Gwenda-Lin Grewal called them an example of surrealist high comedy in fashion, comparing them to the absurdist shoe hat created by Italian designer Elsa Schiaparelli in 1937.

Performance scholar Franziska Bork Petersen picked up the thread of Charleston and Granata's arguments in her book Body Utopianism (2022), analysing the armadillo shoes as analogous to prosthetics in their altering of the human form. Petersen noted that while watching the runway show, the distinctive gait of the models wearing the armadillo heels became a visual norm, and that the more typical gait of models wearing other shoes "stand out in their otherness". She argues that their ability to wear the difficult shoes proficiently makes them "technicians" on the runway, and that it is the movement of the models which completes the visual impact of the shoe. She situates the unusual shape of the shoe as typical of fashion rather than an outlier, arguing that throughout the history of fashion design, clothing and footwear have significantly altered the natural shape of the human body. Although she critiques the armadillo shoes for existing as commercial rather than strictly artistic objects, Petersen concludes that the radical alteration the shoes make to the appearance of the body can "open up the possibility to encounter the familiar human body as strange", allowing for unconventional ideas of beauty to emerge in the viewer.

== See also ==
- List of shoe styles

== Bibliography ==
- Antonelli, Paola; Millar Fisher, Michelle (2017). Items: Is Fashion Modern?. New York City: The Museum of Modern Art. p. 283. ISBN 978-1-63345-036-3. OCLC 973794681.
- Bari, Shahidha K. (2020). Dressed: A Philosophy of Clothes. New York City: Basic Books. ISBN 978-1-5416-4598-1. OCLC 1108524905.
- Bell, Deborah (17 December 2014). "Introduction". Masquerade: Essays on Tradition and Innovation Worldwide. Jefferson, North Carolina: McFarland & Company. p. 6. ISBN 978-0-7864-7646-6.
- Birringer, Johannes (2016). "Performance In the Cabinet of Curiosities: Or, The Boy Who Lived in the Tree". PAJ: A Journal of Performance and Art. 38 (3): 27–28. doi:10.1162/PAJJ_a_00331. ISSN 1520-281X. JSTOR 26386804. S2CID 57559845.
- Bolton, Andrew (2011). Alexander McQueen: Savage Beauty. New York City: Metropolitan Museum of Art. ISBN 978-1-58839-412-5. OCLC 687693871.
- Esguerra, Clarissa M.; Hansen, Michaela (2022). Lee Alexander McQueen: Mind, Mythos, Muse. New York City: Delmonico Books. ISBN 978-1-63681-018-8. OCLC 1289986708.
- Fairer, Robert; Wilcox, Claire (2016). Alexander McQueen: Unseen. New Haven, Connecticut: Yale University Press. ISBN 978-0-300-22267-8. OCLC 946216643.
- Gleason, Katherine (2012). Alexander McQueen: Evolution. New York City: Race Point Publishing. ISBN 978-1-63106-444-9.
- Granata, Francesca (23 February 2017). Experimental Fashion: Performance Art, Carnival and the Grotesque Body. London: I. B. Tauris. ISBN 978-1-78673-029-9.
- Gray, Sally; Rutnam, Anisha (2014). "Her Own Real Thing: Lady Gaga and the Haus of Fashion". In Iddon, Martin; Marshall, Melanie L. (eds.). Lady Gaga and Popular Music: Performing Gender, Fashion, and Culture. Routledge Studies in Popular Music. New York City: Routledge. ISBN 978-1-134-07987-2.
- Grewal, Gwenda-lin (19 May 2022). Fashion | Sense: On Philosophy and Fashion. London: Bloomsbury Publishing. ISBN 978-1-350-20148-4.
- Hegarty, Paul (2014). "Lady Gaga and the Drop: Eroticism High and Low". In Iddon, Martin; Marshall, Melanie L. (eds.). Lady Gaga and Popular Music: Performing Gender, Fashion, and Culture. Routledge Studies in Popular Music. New York City: Routledge. ISBN 978-1-134-07987-2.
- Knox, Kristin (2010). Alexander McQueen: Genius of a Generation. London: A&C Black. ISBN 978-1-4081-3223-4.
- Mora, Juliana Luna; Berry, Jess (2 September 2022). "Creative Direction Succession in Luxury Fashion: The Illusion of Immortality at Chanel and Alexander McQueen". Luxury. 9 (2–3). doi:10.1080/20511817.2022.2194039. ISSN 2051-1817.
- Petersen, Franziska Bork (2022). Body Utopianism: Prosthetic Being Between Enhancement and Estrangement. Palgrave Studies in Utopianism. London: Palgrave Macmillan. ISBN 978-3-030-97486-2.
- Quick, Harriet (2018). Vogue: The Shoe. Portfolio series. London: Conran Octopus. ISBN 978-1-84091-779-6.
- Szmigin, Isabelle; Piacentini, Maria (2014). Consumer Behaviour. Oxford: Oxford University Press. ISBN 978-0-19-964644-9.
- Stępień, Justyna (3 July 2017). "'Savage Beauties'. Alexander McQueen's Performance of Posthuman Bodies". International Journal of Performance Arts and Digital Media. 13 (2): 170–182. doi:10.1080/14794713.2017.1345584. ISSN 1479-4713.
- Wilcox, Claire, ed. (2015). Alexander McQueen. New York City: Abrams Books. ISBN 978-1-4197-1723-9. OCLC 891618596.
  - Persson, Helen. "Walking Out". In Wilcox (2015), pp. 110–115.
  - Wilcox, Claire. "Plato's Atlantis: Anatomy of a Collection". In Wilcox (2015), pp. 83–103.
- Wilson, Andrew (2015). Alexander McQueen: Blood Beneath the Skin. New York City: Simon and Schuster. ISBN 978-1-4767-7674-3. OCLC 1310585849.
