= Fit model =

Model used by a fashion designer to check the fit and look of clothing

A fit model (sometimes fitting model) is a person who is used by a fashion designer or clothing manufacturer to check the fit, drape and visual appearance of a design on a 'real' human being, effectively acting as a live mannequin. A person is selected to work as a fitting model primarily on criteria matching the desired measurement specifications of the designer or manufacturer. These specifications generally consist of height, bust-waist-hip circumference, arm and leg length, shoulder width, and a myriad other measurements as indicated by the garment type. This is the case whether the garments are for women or men of any size; the grading of construction patterns is often tested on a variety of fitting models to be sure that increases in size are translated accurately and evenly across the range.

Beyond merely wearing the garment for inspection, a fit model can become an integral role in the design process; commenting on garments and materials with regard to fit, movement and feel on flesh, and objective feedback on the 'fit' and design of the garment in the stead of the consumer. Ultimately, a fitting model aids in confirming that the sizing, design and cut of the garment to be produced meets the designer's specifications and intentions.

For female fit models there are five basic types of fit: junior, missy, contemporary, plus-size, and petite. The measurements and proportions vary based on size as well as age. Depending on the brand and demographic of their customer sometimes the brand has more than one fit, which may also vary according to region. Many major brands make clothes in juniors and missy sizes. For example: a female (Australian) size 10 is:

Height: 170 cm (67 inch)
Waist: 72 cm (27 inch)
Hip: 98 cm (39 inch)
Bust: 89 cm (35 inch)
Female models in America are usually a size 4 and:
Height: 5'4 - 5'9
Waist: 26 inch
Hips 37 inch
Bust: 34 inch

== See also ==
- Modeling
