= Fashionista (website) =

Fashion website

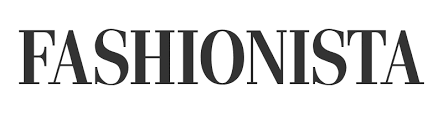
- Website type: Fashion news
- Available in: English
- Editor: Breaking Media
- Website: fashionista.com
- Launched: 2007

Fashionista is a fashion website owned by Breaking Media.

== History ==
Fashionista was launched in 2007. It was originally written as a fashion blog by Faran Krentcil. In April 2009, editor Natalie Hormilla stepped down.

By 2010, Fashionista had gained worldwide popularity in the fashion niche and revamped its website and logo (also moving it from Joomla to WordPress). In 2010, Breaking Media raised a $1.3 million round of investment.

In November 2013, Stephanie Trong and Lauren Indvik were named co-editors-in-chief of Fashionista, succeeding to Leah Chernikoff. In March 2014, Stephanie Trong stepped down, leaving Lauren Indvik the sole editor-in-chief of the website. In April 2014, the website was moved from WordPress to SAY Media's content management and monetization platform Tempest.

In April 2015, Breaking Media raised another $1.5 million round of investment. In November 2015, Lauren Indvik was named editor at large of Fashionista, succeeding to Lauren Sherman. In December 2015, Fashionista introduced its own advertising studio (Fashionista CoLab) to offer custom advertising experiences to advertisers.

== Description ==
Fashionista is the most-visited website edited by Breaking Media. Compared to other fashion news websites, Fashionista's editorial is more pop culture and geared to a younger audience.

== Awards ==
- 2012: Webby Award for best fashion website

== Related pages ==
- Fashion journalism
