= Met Gala =

Annual fundraising gala held in New York City

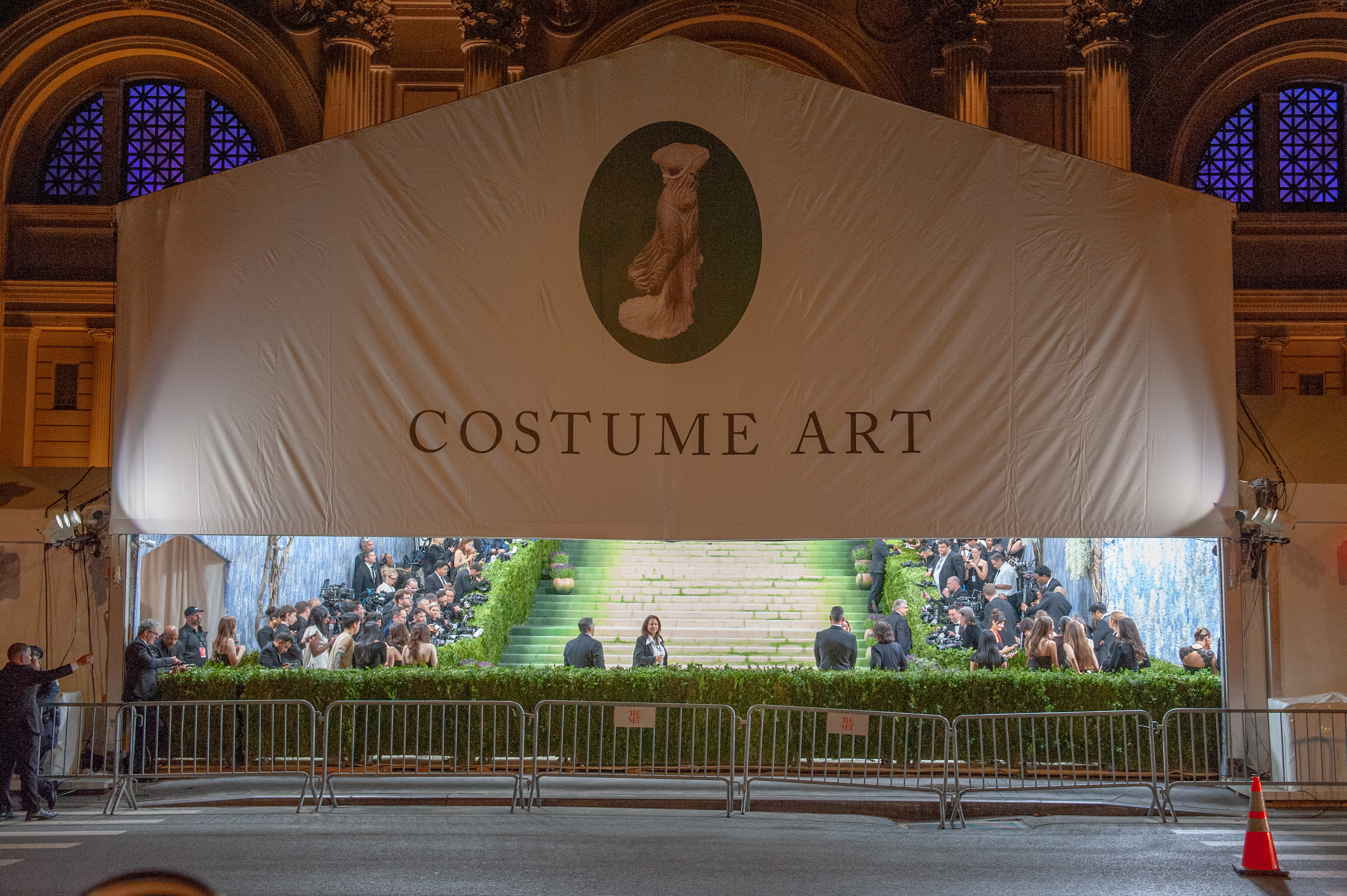
- The Metropolitan Museum of Art for the 2026 Met Gala
- Genre: Fundraising gala, contribution of $100,000 per seat to enter the 2026 Met Gala
- Frequency: Annual, held on the first Monday of May
- Venue: Metropolitan Museum of Art's Costume Institute
- Locations: Fifth Avenue, Manhattan, New York City
- Country: United States
- Years active: 1948–present
- Founder: Eleanor Lambert
- Most recent: May 4, 2026
- Next event: May 3, 2027
- Organizer: Vogue
- Website: The Costume Institute
- The Gala was founded in 1946, and the first major event was held in 1948.

The Met Gala, formally known as the Costume Institute Benefit, is the annual haute couture fundraising festival held at and for the benefit of the Metropolitan Museum of Art's Costume Institute on the Museum Mile of Fifth Avenue in Manhattan. Often known as "fashion's biggest night", the Met Gala is popularly regarded as the world's most prestigious and glamorous event in fashion.

The Gala is held annually on the first Monday of May, which marks the opening of the Costume Institute's annual fashion exhibit hosted on the Upper East Side of Manhattan. The Met Gala is one of the most important sources of funding for the Met Museum's Costume Institute, with the high price of attendance being a contribution. The entry price for one ticket to attend the Met Gala rose to US$100,000 in 2026, and the 2026 Gala brought in a record US$42 million for the Costume Institute.

The event is organized by the fashion and glamour magazine Vogue under direction of Global Chief Content Officer Anna Wintour. Wintour, who was the former editor-in-chief of Vogue, has chaired or co-chaired the Met Gala since 1995, except for the 1996 Met Gala, which was chaired by Wintour's successor at British Vogue, Liz Tilberis, who attended with her friend Diana, Princess of Wales.

Known as "the world's most exclusive party", an invitation is highly sought after. Invitees to attend the Met Gala in a given year are typically personalities widely perceived to be culturally relevant to contemporary society from various professional spheres, including globally-focused fashion, digital and social media, tech, music, Broadway, Wall Street, film, television, sports, and politics. Guests are expected to curate their fashions to match the theme of the annual exhibit, generally in formal haute couture.

== History ==
The Met Gala was established in 1948 by fashion publicist Eleanor Lambert as a fundraiser for the newly founded Costume Institute and to mark the opening of its annual exhibit. The first gala was a dinner, with tickets at 50 dollars each. Over the first few decades, the Gala was simply one of many annual benefits held for New York charitable institutions. The attendees were almost entirely members of New York high society or the city's fashion industry. From 1948 to 1971, the event was held at various prominent Manhattan venues, including the Waldorf Astoria, Central Park, and the Rainbow Room.

When Diana Vreeland became consultant to the Costume Institute in 1972, the Gala began to evolve into a more global and glamorous affair, although one that was still aimed at New York's local high-societal set. The event became more celebrity-oriented with attendees like Elizabeth Taylor, Andy Warhol, Bianca Jagger, Diana Ross, Elton John, Liza Minnelli, Madonna, Barbra Streisand, and Cher intermixing with the city's other elite. It was during the Vreeland years that the Gala was first held at the Met and that Gala themes were introduced.

Since 1948, the Met Gala has generally been held annually, although events were cancelled in 1963 and 1969. In 2000, the Gala and a planned Chanel retrospective were cancelled due to the death of the Costume Institute's chief curator Richard Martin, and in 2002, the Gala and exhibition were cancelled again out of respect for ongoing recovery efforts due to the September 11 attacks. In 2020, the Met Gala was not held due to the COVID-19 pandemic, and the opening of the exhibition About Time: Fashion and Duration was postponed. The Gala resumed in 2021, but took place in September rather than in May that year.

Historically, the Oscars has been the representative showcase of glamor; however, by the early 2010s, new media, streaming platforms, and a cultural drift away from both network television and award shows converged to produce a perceived shift of the center of glamor from the Oscars to the Met Gala.

== Present day ==
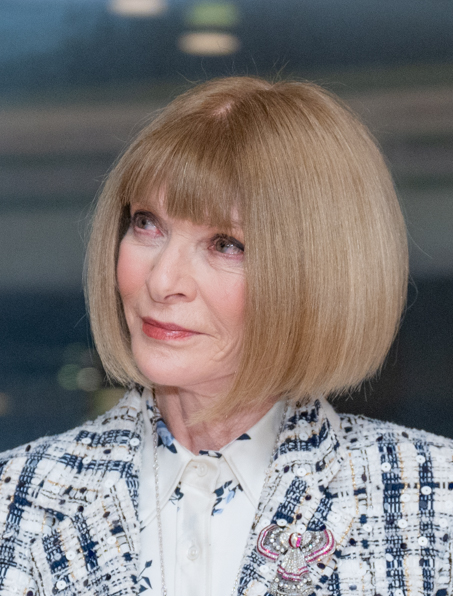
Anna Wintour, the lead chairperson of the Met Gala since the 1990s

The Met Costume Institute Gala is the globally renowned, haute couture fundraising spectacle that serves as an opening celebration for the institute's annual fashion exhibit. Following the event, the exhibition runs for several months. For example, the 2014 exhibition was scheduled to run from May 8 until August 10, 2014. The museum is closed to the general public on the first Monday of May to facilitate the Gala's festivities.

Fashion executive Anna Wintour, former editor-in-chief of Vogue, has chaired or co-chaired the Met Gala since 1995, except for the 1996 Met Gala, which was chaired by Wintour's successor at British Vogue, Liz Tilberis, who attended with her friend Diana, Princess of Wales.

The Gala, increasingly attended by personalities from the convergence of the arts, tech, social media, fashion, high society, film, Broadway, and music, has been held at the Met since 1948 and is considered to be the global fashion industry's premier annual red carpet event, and as such, promotes haute couture themes and styles. However, the Met Gala has evolved over time to include culturally impactful tastemakers, influencers, and icons from all dimensions of the human existence, including sports, technology, business, and politics. The event's red carpet fashions are widely photographed, reviewed, critiqued, and emulated.

=== Theme ===
The exhibit is assigned a specific theme each year to reflect the contemporaneous cultural zeitgeist, with guests being expected but not mandated to follow. It includes a cocktail hour and a formal dinner. During the cocktail hour, guests arrive to walk on the red carpet, tour the year's special themed exhibition, and be seated before the dinner party that includes entertainment from the preeminent entertainers of the day. The theme not only sets the tone for the annual exhibit, but also for the guests who attempt to dress in conjunction with the theme of the year, oftentimes causing runs on certain fashion themes among the world's leading fashion retailers.

Sometimes, as in 2013, with Punk: Chaos to Couture, the theme given has been considered unclear or difficult to follow because it does not provide a clear stylistic directive. At other times, including in 2014, with Charles James: Beyond Fashion, the theme may be far more challenging for one gender, as James made clothing intended for women. When the Met Gala announced a dress code requiring white tie attire; several media outlets pointed out the difficulty and expense of obtaining traditional white tie attire at the time, even for the celebrity guests.

For the 2021 Met Gala In America: A Lexicon of Fashion, Curator Andrew Bolton was reportedly "really impressed by American designers' responses to the social and political climate, particularly around issues of body inclusivity and gender fluidity". The 2025 gala focused on Black dandyism.

=== Finances ===
The Met Gala is an annual fundraising event for the Metropolitan Museum of Art’s Costume Institute. It takes place in May and marks the opening of the institute’s spring exhibition .It is also one of the biggest fundraising nights in New York City, with US$9 million raised in 2013, $12 million the following year, and a record $17.4 million by 2022. The Met Gala is one of the most notable sources of funding for the institute, with total contributions surpassing $200 million for the first time after the 2019 event. Anna Wintour, the chairperson of the event, assumed the chairmanship of the Institute in 1995. Her guest list grew to include celebrities globally from the worlds of fashion, entertainment, business, sports, and politics who would eventually grace the pages of Vogue.

Anna Wintour, the former editor-in-chief of Vogue and the lead chairperson of the Gala event since 1995 (excluding 1996 and 1998), has overseen both the benefit committee and the guest list, with Vogue staffers helping to assemble the list of invitees. In 2014, the individual tickets cost US$30,000 for those outside the official guest list, after prices were raised by $10,000 to increase the exclusivity of the event. The annual guest list is limited to approximately 450–600 people. Starting in the 2020s, the Met Gala has started including social-media influencers. The cost of a seat per guest to attend the Met Gala rose to US$50,000 by 2023, and to $75,000 in 2024.

The entry price for one ticket to attend the Met Gala rose to US$100,000 in 2026, up from US$75,000 in 2025, which in turn had reflected an increase from US$50,000 in 2023, to attend the annual gala in New York City. In 2023, software company Launchmetrics found that the Met Gala generated nearly double the "media impact value" (the monetary value of publicity generated) for brands than the Super Bowl, at US$995 million. In 2024, the Met Gala's figure rose to $1.4 billion.

At the 2026 Met Gala, the Costume Institute unveiled its recently inaugurated Condé M. Nast Galleries. The 2026 Gala brought in a record $US42 million for the Costume Institute.

=== Attendees ===
At the 2021 Met Gala, Rosé became the first artist from the K-pop girl group BLACKPINK to attend; she made her debut with a custom Little Black Dress. Since then, multiple BLACKPINK artists have appeared at the Gala. TikTok star Addison Rae also made her first appearance the same year, marking the increasing trend of social media influencer invitees.

The 2025 Met Gala, titled 'Superfine: Tailoring Black Style', took place on Monday, May 5, hosted by Anna Wintour with co-hosts Colman Domingo, Lewis Hamilton, A$AP Rocky, and Pharrell Williams. The honorary co-chair LeBron James was unable to attend due to a knee injury sustained during the National Basketball Association playoff season, but his wife Savannah James attended on his behalf. At the 2025 Met Gala, Shah Rukh Khan, accompanied by celebrity fashion designer Sabyasachi Mukherjee, became the first male Bollywood star to ascend the renowned stairs, although fashion designer Manish Malhotra and Bollywood actresses including Priyanka Chopra, Alia Bhatt, Kiara Advani, and Deepika Padukone have made appearances at the Gala, along with Indian-American actress Mindy Kaling as well as Indian tycoon heiress Isha Ambani and fashion icon Natasha Poonawalla.

=== Rules ===
The 2015 Gala and its theme of "China: Through the Looking Glass" became the subject of a documentary—The First Monday in May, directed by Andrew Rossi and produced by Condé Nast Entertainment, Vogue, and Relativity Studios. A total of 225 approved photographers, reporters, and social media participants documented the event for the documentary. All other attendees were forbidden from using social media at the event. Guests received notices about the restriction of selfies and social media inside the gala. The no-selfie ordinance was extended to the following editions of the Met Gala. Despite the existing "No Selfie Rule," celebrities including Billie Eilish, Dakota Johnson, and Kylie Jenner have started the tradition of taking an annual selfie in the Met bathroom. These pictures have become viral for their eclectic groupings of celebrities who are rarely seen in the same room with each other.

A no-smoking rule was added to the Met Gala bathroom after images of Bella Hadid surfaced smoking in the Met bathroom in 2017; the rule was created and is enforced for public health and safety reasons.

As of 2018, Wintour announced that guests may not be allowed to attend the gala when younger than the age of 18.

== Controversies ==
=== Controversies: 2009–2019 ===
Models Naomi Campbell and Stephanie Seymour pulled out of attending the 2009 Met Gala at the last minute, in a show of support for designer Azzedine Alaïa. After discovering that none of his work was included in the Costume Institute exhibit, Alaïa asked the models not to wear the dresses he had designed for them to the Gala and they chose not to attend altogether. Alaïa was well-known for having close relationships with his models, and his exclusion from the "Model as Muse" exhibit was seen as a snub. He criticized Wintour (with whom he had a longtime feud) for having "too much power over this museum."

In 2014, the Gala was disturbed by a streaker who wasn't able to make it up the stairs but nevertheless caused a commotion. This was followed by a fight in the elevator at the after party between Solange Knowles and Jay-Z. Security tape showed Solange speaking angrily to Jay-Z (the husband of her sister Beyoncé) before hitting and kicking him.

In 2015, the Gala's theme, originally named "Chinese Whispers: Tales of the East in Art, Film and Fashion," was renamed to "China: Through the Looking Glass." The theme was met with critics saying it was "A reminder of the subtle institutionalized racism that's been compounded by centuries of Asian isolationism across the board, and enduring Western stereotypes exacerbated by ignorance and the meme-able nature of social media." One of the most criticized actresses was Sarah Jessica Parker, who wore a headdress which was thought to conform to the Dragon Lady stereotype.

In October 2017, an episode of James Corden's Late Late Show aired a segment with Anna Wintour where she said President Donald Trump was banned from the Met Gala. Despite his consecutive appearances from 2004 to 2012, he became the first celebrity to ever be banned from attending.

The 2018 Gala had a Roman Catholic theme. In attendance, Rihanna wore a pearl and jewel-encrusted robe, matching papal mitre and necklace, Christian Louboutin heels, an outfit designed by Maison Margiela. Critics on social media called it "blasphemous" and "sacrilegious cosplay", even though the Catholic Church lent more than forty papal vestments from the Vatican for the exhibition, and Cardinal Timothy M. Dolan attended. American critic Kyle Smith argued that the Catholic Church was in fact "abetting the mockery of its symbols."

=== Controversies: 2020–present ===
The 2021 Met Gala theme was "In America: A Lexicon of Fashion." The American theme of the gala allowed celebrities to go in many different directions with how they chose to embody the theme. Democratic U.S. representative Alexandria Ocasio-Cortez of New York attended the 2021 Met Gala dressed by designer Aurora James. Ocasio-Cortez's controversial look was bold and targeted the attendees of the Met; she wore a white off-the-shoulder gown with the phrase "tax the rich" sewn onto the back in bold red satin lettering. This look faced controversy as many thought it was hypocritical to condemn wealth inequality while attending an event with a $35,000 ticket. In an interview, designer Aurora James explains how she thinks it smart to be able to deliver the message directly to those who need to hear it. The United States House Committee on Ethics later determined that Ocasio-Cortez failed to comply with the House's gifting rule as part of this appearance by improperly accepting free admission to the gala for her partner and by failing to pay full fair market value for some of the items she wore at the event.

In 2022, with the theme of "Gilded Glamour", Kim Kardashian wore the gown Marilyn Monroe wore when singing "Happy Birthday, Mr. President" to John F. Kennedy in 1962. The gown is the property of Ripley's Believe It or Not. The controversy around the gown started when some noticed some damage to the gown. Other controversies came from the diet that Kim Kardashian had to adhere to in order to wear the gown.

In 2024, the Met Gala was the flashpoint of the Blockout 2024 online social media campaign, which promote blocking the accounts of celebrities who attended the event. The appearance of attendees after recent university campus war protests related to the Gaza war caused many to compare the celebrities to those in The Hunger Games. In an opinion piece for USA Today, columnist Nicole Russell compared the Met Gala to The Hunger Games' wealthy Capitol, and the rest of the United States and the world to the Districts of Panem which "struggle with consequences like poverty, inflation, homelessness and even war".

At the 2025 Met Gala, red carpet interviewers Ego Nwodim and Teyana Taylor appeared to be unaware of Bollywood actor Shah Rukh Khan's notoriety in South Asia and the Middle East. Khan's fashion designer Sabyasachi Mukherjee stepped in and provided the interviewers context in the otherwise good-natured interview, even noting that there had been nearly a "stampede" of fans waiting outside Khan's New York hotel. The perceived lack of adequate recognition of Bollywood celebrity by Western media at the gala generated widespread criticism in South Asia and the Middle East. In regard to the controversy, Vogue responded that there was no intention to ignore or slight anyone.

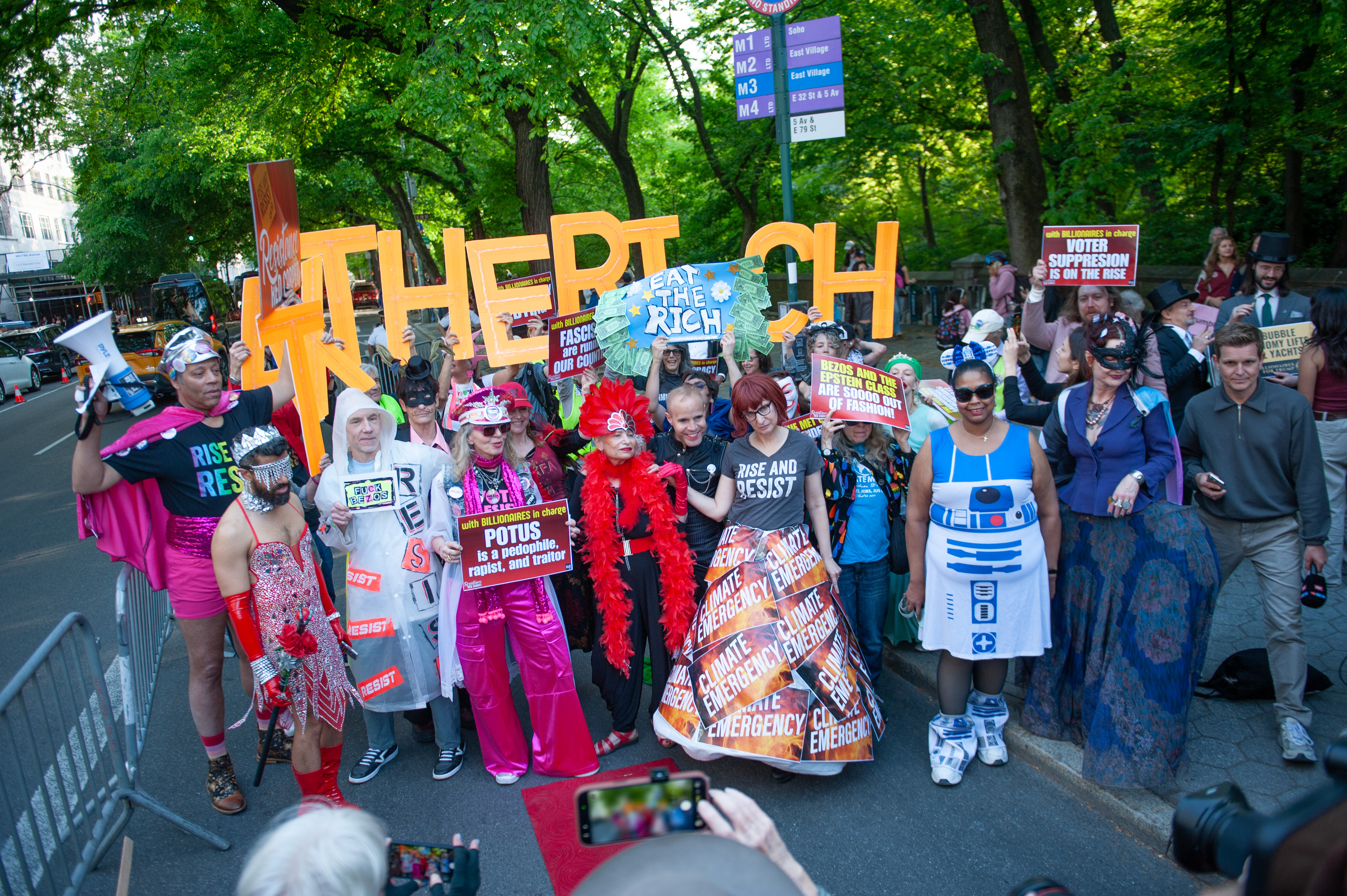
Protesters holding a "Resistance Red Carpet" near the 2026 Met Gala.

The 2026 Met Gala saw controversy surrounding the presence of Amazon founder and billionaire Jeff Bezos and his wife Lauren Sánchez Bezos as the lead sponsors and honorary co-chairs. The couple raised $10 million in donations to the museum. Protesters down the street held a "Resistance Red Carpet".

In August 2026, the Met Gala announced John Galliano: Horizons, a Costume Institute exhibition for the 2027 Met Gala devoted to British fashion designer John Galliano. The announcement drew criticism over the designer's past antisemitic remarks, which had led to his 2011 dismissal from Dior and a conviction in France. After objections from Jewish leaders, including New York City Council Speaker Julie Menin, and threats by donors to withdraw support, the Met canceled the exhibition on August 31, 2026.

== List of Met Galas ==
The following is a list of Met Galas, as well as the chairs and entertainment, for the Galas that have taken place since themes were introduced in 1973.

Date	Theme	Co-chairs	Honorary chairs	Sponsor	Ticket price	Ref.
March 21, 1973	The World of Balenciaga	None	None	Government of Spain	$85	
December 12, 1973	The 10s, the 20s, the 30s: Inventive Clothes: 1909–1939	Phyllis Ellsworth Dillon	None		$100	
November 20, 1974	Romantic and Glamorous Hollywood Design	Jane Engelhard	None	SCM Corporation	$150	
December 10, 1975	American Women of Style	Jane Engelhard	None	SCM Corporation	$125	
December 6, 1976	The Glory of Russian Costume	Jacqueline Kennedy Onassis	None	SCM Corporation	$150	
December 12, 1977	Vanity Fair: A Treasure Trove	Jacqueline Kennedy Onassis	None	Halston		
November 20, 1978	Diaghilev: Costumes and Designs of the Ballets Russes	Pat Buckley	None			
December 3, 1979	Fashions of the Habsburg Era: Austria-Hungary	Pat Buckley	None		$200	
December 9, 1980	The Manchu Dragon: Costumes of China, the Chi'ng Dynasty	Pat Buckley	None			
December 7, 1981	The Eighteenth-Century Woman	Pat Buckley	None	Merle Norman Cosmetics	$350	
December 6, 1982	La Belle Époque	Pat Buckley	None	Pierre Cardin	$500	
December 5, 1983	Yves Saint Laurent: 25 Years of Design	Pat Buckley	None	Gustave Zumsteg	$500	
December 3, 1984	Man and the Horse	Pat Buckley	None	Ralph Lauren	$750	
December 9, 1985	Costumes of Royal India	Pat Buckley	None	Ratti, Christian Humann Foundation		
December 8, 1986	Dance	Pat Buckley	None	Shiseido	$750	
December 7, 1987	A Tribute to Diana Vreeland	Pat Buckley	None	Reliance Group Holdings	$850	
December 5, 1988	From Queen to Empress: Victorian Dress 1837–1877	Pat Buckley	None	The Leslie Fay Companies	$850	
December 4, 1989	The Age of Napoleon: Costume from Revolution to Empire, 1789–1815	Pat Buckley	None	Wolfgang K. Flottl		
December 3, 1990	Théâtre de la Mode – Fashion Dolls: The Survival of Haute Couture	Pat Buckley	None	Wolfgang K. Flottl	$900	
December 9, 1991	No theme, as no concurrent costume exhibition was held	Pat Buckley	None			
December 7, 1992	Fashion and History: A Dialogue	Pat Buckley	None			
December 6, 1993	Diana Vreeland: Immoderate Style	Pat Buckley	None		$900	
December 5, 1994	Orientalism: Visions of the East in Western dress	Pat Buckley, Oscar de la Renta, Bill Blass	None		$900	
December 4, 1995	Haute Couture	Anna Wintour, Annette de la Renta, Clarissa Bronfman	Karl Lagerfeld, Gianni Versace	Karl Lagerfeld for Chanel, Gianni Versace	$1,000	
December 9, 1996	Christian Dior	Elizabeth Tilberis, Marie-Chantal, Crown Princess of Greece, Helene David-Weill	None	Dior, LVMH	$1,000	
December 8, 1997	Gianni Versace	Anna Wintour, Julia Koch, Patrick McCarthy	None	David H. Koch Foundation, VH1, Fairchild Publications	$2,000	
December 7, 1998	Cubism and Fashion	Anna Wintour, Miuccia Prada, Paula Cussi, Pia Getty	None	Prada	$2,000	
December 6, 1999	Rock Style	Anna Wintour, Tommy Hilfiger, Aerin Lauder	None	Tommy Hilfiger, Estée Lauder		
April 23, 2001	Jacqueline Kennedy: The White House Years	Anna Wintour, Christina and Lindsay Owen-Jones, Annette and Oscar de la Renta, Carolina Herrera	Caroline Kennedy and Edwin A. Schlossberg	L'Oréal		
April 28, 2003	Goddess: The Classical Mode	Anna Wintour, Tom Ford, Nicole Kidman	None	Gucci		
April 26, 2004	Dangerous Liaisons: Fashion and Furniture in the 18th Century	Anna Wintour, Renée Zellweger, Lawrence Stroll, Silas Chou, Edgar Bronfman Jr.	Jacob Rothschild, Jayne Wrightsman	Asprey		
May 2, 2005	The House of Chanel	Anna Wintour, Karl Lagerfeld, Nicole Kidman	Caroline, Princess of Hanover	Chanel		
May 1, 2006	AngloMania: Tradition and Transgression in British Fashion	Anna Wintour, Christopher Bailey, Sienna Miller	Rose Marie Bravo, The Duke of Devonshire	Burberry		
May 7, 2007	Poiret: King of Fashion	Anna Wintour, Cate Blanchett, Nicolas Ghesquière	François-Henri Pinault	Balenciaga		
May 5, 2008	Superheroes: Fashion and Fantasy	Anna Wintour, George Clooney, Julia Roberts	Giorgio Armani	Giorgio Armani		
May 4, 2009	The Model As Muse: Embodying Fashion	Anna Wintour, Kate Moss, Justin Timberlake	Marc Jacobs	Marc Jacobs	$7,500	
May 3, 2010	American Woman: Fashioning a National Identity	Anna Wintour, Oprah Winfrey, Patrick Robinson	None	Gap		
May 2, 2011	Alexander McQueen: Savage Beauty	Anna Wintour, Colin Firth, Stella McCartney	François-Henri Pinault and Salma Hayek	Alexander McQueen		
May 7, 2012	Schiaparelli and Prada: Impossible Conversations	Anna Wintour, Carey Mulligan, Miuccia Prada	Jeff Bezos	Amazon		
May 6, 2013	Punk: Chaos to Couture	Anna Wintour, Rooney Mara, Lauren Santo Domingo, Riccardo Tisci	Beyoncé	Moda Operandi	$15,000	
May 5, 2014	Charles James: Beyond Fashion	Aerin Lauder, Anna Wintour, Bradley Cooper, Oscar de la Renta, Sarah Jessica Parker, Lizzie and Jonathan Tisch	None	AERIN	$25,000	
May 4, 2015	China: Through the Looking Glass	Anna Wintour, Jennifer Lawrence, Gong Li, Marissa Mayer, Wendi Murdoch	Silas Chou	Yahoo	$25,000	
May 2, 2016	Manus x Machina: Fashion in an Age of Technology	Anna Wintour, Taylor Swift, Idris Elba, Jonathan Ive	Nicolas Ghesquière, Karl Lagerfeld, Miuccia Prada	Apple	$30,000	
May 1, 2017	Rei Kawakubo/Comme des Garçons: Art of the In-Between	Anna Wintour, Gisele Bündchen and Tom Brady, Katy Perry, Pharrell Williams	Rei Kawakubo	Apple, Condé Nast, Farfetch, H&M, Maison Valentino	$30,000	
May 7, 2018	Heavenly Bodies: Fashion and the Catholic Imagination	Anna Wintour, Rihanna, Amal Clooney, Donatella Versace	Christine and Stephen A. Schwarzman	Christine and Stephen A. Schwarzman, Versace	$30,000	
May 6, 2019	Camp: Notes on Fashion	Anna Wintour, Lady Gaga, Harry Styles, Serena Williams, Alessandro Michele	None	Gucci	$35,000	
Planned for May 4, 2020 (canceled)	About Time: Fashion and Duration	Anna Wintour, Meryl Streep, Emma Stone, Lin-Manuel Miranda, Nicolas Ghesquière	None	Louis Vuitton	N/A	
September 13, 2021	In America: A Lexicon of Fashion	Timothée Chalamet, Billie Eilish, Amanda Gorman, Naomi Osaka	Tom Ford, Adam Mosseri, Anna Wintour	Instagram	$35,000	
May 2, 2022	In America: An Anthology of Fashion	Blake Lively and Ryan Reynolds, Lin-Manuel Miranda, Regina King	Tom Ford, Adam Mosseri, Anna Wintour	Instagram	$35,000	
May 1, 2023	Karl Lagerfeld: A Line of Beauty	Anna Wintour, Dua Lipa, Michaela Coel, Penélope Cruz, Roger Federer	None	Chanel, Fendi, Karl Lagerfeld (brand)	$50,000	
May 6, 2024	Sleeping Beauties: Reawakening Fashion (Dress code: The Garden of Time)	Anna Wintour, Jennifer Lopez, Zendaya, Chris Hemsworth, Bad Bunny	Shou Zi Chew, Jonathan Anderson	TikTok, Loewe	$75,000	
May 5, 2025	Superfine: Tailoring Black Style (Dress code: tailored for you)	Anna Wintour, Pharrell Williams, ASAP Rocky, Lewis Hamilton, Colman Domingo	LeBron James	Louis Vuitton	$75,000	
May 4, 2026	Costume Art (Dress code: fashion is art)	Anna Wintour, Beyoncé, Nicole Kidman, Venus Williams	Jeff and Lauren Sánchez Bezos	Jeff and Lauren Sánchez Bezos, Saint Laurent	$100,000	
May 3, 2027	extraORDINARY: Fashion and the Poetics of the Everyday (Note: On August 31, 2026, the Met announced in a joint statement with the designer that the exhibition John Galliano: Horizons was canceled due to the designer’s past antisemitic and racist statements. The new theme was announced on November 5, 2026.)	TBA	TBA	Instagram, Moncler, Condé Nast, Jordan Roth	TBA	

== See also ==
- Oscars Red Carpet
- The First Monday in May
- Ocean's 8
- TIME 100
- Vogue World 2024
