= Andrew Bolton (curator) =

British art museum curator

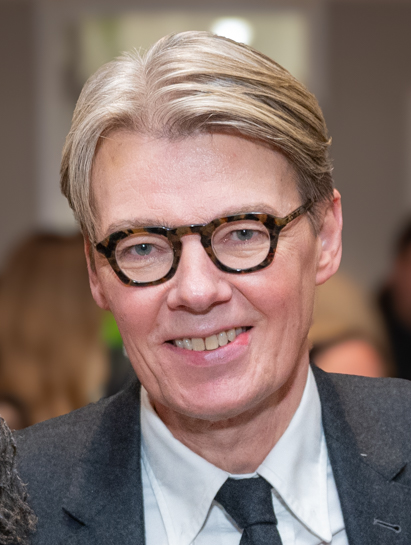
- Born: 1966 (age 59–60); Blackburn, Lancashire, England
- Occupations: Curator in chief, Anna Wintour Costume Center
- Known for: Savage Beauty; China: Through the Looking Glass
- Partner: Thom Browne

Andrew John Bolton OBE (born 1966) is a British museum curator and incumbent head curator of the Anna Wintour Costume Center at the Metropolitan Museum of Art in New York City, the host venue for the annual Met Gala.

== Early life and education ==
Bolton was born in 1966 in Blackburn, Lancashire, England, and majored in anthropology at the University of East Anglia in Norwich, where he graduated with an undergraduate degree in 1987, and subsequently completed a master's degree.

== Career ==
Bolton began his career at London's Victoria and Albert Museum.

On September 8, 2015, it was announced that he would replace the retiring Harold Koda as curator in chief of the Anna Wintour Costume Center in New York City. Later that year, he was awarded the Vilcek Prize in Fashion. Bolton has created and or co-created several critically lauded exhibitions including Savage Beauty featuring clothing created by British fashion designer Alexander McQueen, as well as China: Through the Looking Glass (both with Koda). Bolton exhibitions are known for their "scholarly rigor....whimsy.... (and) theatricality".

Japanese fashion designer Rei Kawakubo was the subject of the 2017 exhibit. In an interview with Vogue in April 2017, Bolton stated, "I really think her influence is so huge, but sometimes it's subtle. It's not about copying her; it's the purity of her vision."

Bolton's show, Heavenly Bodies: Fashion and the Catholic Imagination, opened on 10 May 2018. Bolton described the exhibition as an examination of "the role dress plays within the Roman Catholic Church and the role the Roman Catholic Church plays within the fashionable imagination". The exhibition included objects from the Vatican Collection alongside designs by Gianni Versace, John Galliano for Dior, Yves Saint Laurent and other designers.

Bolton is featured alongside Anna Wintour in Andrew Rossi's 2016 documentary film The First Monday in May, which documents the staging of the Metropolitan Museum's annual Costume Institute Gala.

Bolton was appointed Officer of the Order of the British Empire (OBE) in the 2023 Birthday Honours for services to art and fashion.

== Costume Institute exhibitions ==
- 2006: AngloMania: Tradition and Transgression in British Fashion (May 3 – September 6, 2006)
- 2007: Poiret: King of Fashion (May 9 – August 5, 2007)
- 2008: Superheroes: Fashion and Fantasy (May 7 – September 1, 2008)
- 2009: The Model As Muse: Embodying Fashion (May 6 – August 9, 2009)
- 2010: American Woman: Fashioning a National Identity (May 5 – August 10, 2010)
- 2011: Alexander McQueen: Savage Beauty (May 4 – August 7, 2011)
- 2012: Schiaparelli and Prada: Impossible Conversations (May 10 – August 19, 2012)
- 2013: Punk: Chaos to Couture (May 9 – August 14, 2013)
- 2014: Charles James: Beyond Fashion (May 8 – August 10, 2014)
- 2014–2015: Death Becomes Her: A Century of Mourning Attire (October 21, 2014 – February 1, 2015)
- 2015: China: Through the Looking Glass• (May 7 – September 7, 2015)
- 2015–2016: Jacqueline de Ribes: The Art of Style (November 19, 2015 – February 21, 2016)
- 2016: Manus x Machina: Fashion In An Age Of Technology (May 5 – September 5, 2016)
- 2016–2017: Masterworks: Unpacking Fashion (November 18, 2016 – February 5, 2017)
- 2017: Rei Kawakubo/Comme des Garçons: Art of the In-Between (May 4 – September 4, 2017)
- 2018: Heavenly Bodies: Fashion and the Catholic Imagination (May 10 – October 8, 2018)
- 2019: Camp: Notes on Fashion (May 8 – September 9, 2019)
- 2020: About Time: Fashion and Duration
- 2021–2022 In America: A Lexicon of Fashion (Part one of a two part exhibition)
- 2022 In America: An Anthology of Fashion (Part two of a two part exhibition)
- 2023 Karl Lagerfeld: A Line of Beauty
- 2024 Sleeping Beauties: Reawakening Fashion
- 2025 Superfine: Tailoring Black Style
- 2026 Costume Art

== Personal life ==
Since 2011, Bolton has lived in Manhattan with fashion designer Thom Browne, his partner.

== Literary works ==
The following is an incomplete list of his literary works:

- Bolton, Andrew (2002). The Supermodern Wardrobe. New York: V&A.
- Bolton, Andrew (November 2, 2010). Sui, Anna; White, Jack; Meisel, Steven, eds. Anna Sui. New York: Chronicle Books. ISBN 1452128596.
- Bolton, Andrew (2011). McQueen, Alexander, eds. Alexander McQueen: Savage Beauty. New York: Metropolitan Museum of Art. ISBN 9781588394125.
- Bolton, Andrew (and Richard Hell, Jon Savage, John Lydon) (2013), eds. Punk: Chaos to Couture. New York: Metropolitan Museum of Art.
- Bolton, Andrew (2016). Manux X Machina: Fashion in an Age of Technology. New York: Metropolitan Museum of Art.
- Bolton, Andrew (2017). Rei Kawakubo/Comme des Garçons: Art of the In-Between. New York: Metropolitan Museum of Art.
- Bolton, Andrew (2018). Heavenly Bodies: Fashion and the Catholic Imagination. New York: Metropolitan Museum of Art.
- Bolton, Andrew (2019). In Pursuit of Fashion: The Sandy Schreier Collection. New York: Metropolitan Museum of Art.

== See also ==
- LGBT culture in New York City
- List of LGBT people from New York City
- NYC Pride March
