= Patricia Buckley =

Canadian-American socialite

- Born: Patricia Aldyen Austin Taylor; July 1, 1926; Vancouver, British Columbia, Canada
- Died: April 15, 2007 (aged 80); Stamford, Connecticut, U.S.
- Education: Vassar College
- Spouse: William F. Buckley Jr.
- Children: Christopher
- Parent(s): Austin Cotterell Taylor; Kathleen Elliott

Patricia Aldyen Austin Buckley (née Taylor; July 1, 1926 – April 15, 2007) was a Canadian-American socialite, noted for her fundraising activities. She was the wife of conservative writer and activist William F. Buckley Jr. and the mother of writer Christopher Buckley, their only child.

== Life ==
Patricia Taylor was born in Vancouver, British Columbia, to Austin Cotterell Taylor, a wealthy industrialist, and Kathleen Elliott, the daughter of the chief of police of Winnipeg. She had two siblings, and attended Crofton House School. Patricia went to Vassar College in 1948 but left to marry William F. Buckley Jr., the older brother of her Vassar roommate, Patricia Lee Buckley. William and Patricia Buckley had one child, writer Christopher Buckley.

Aside from their home in Stamford, Connecticut, the Buckleys also had a Park Avenue duplex in Manhattan and leased the Chateau de Rougemont, a former monastery, near Gstaad, Switzerland, for winters. Her dark sense of humour was manifested when economist John Kenneth Galbraith brought Ted Kennedy to visit the Buckleys at Rougemont one winter. Kennedy asked if he could borrow a car to go back to Gstaad. Pat replied, "Certainly not—there are three bridges between here and Gstaad."

In 1975, she was named to the International Best-Dressed Hall of Fame created by Eleanor Lambert. She served as chairwoman of the Metropolitan Museum of Art's Costume Institute benefit from 1978 to 1995, making it a major event on the charity social circuit. Other focuses included the Memorial Sloan Kettering Cancer Center, the New York University Medical Center, as well as Vietnam War veterans.

She became a United States citizen in the early 1990s.

== Death ==
Patricia Taylor Buckley died in Stamford, Connecticut, aged 80, after a period of ill health. Her widower reported in National Review, following her death in April 2007, that her "infirmities dated back to a skiing accident in 1965. She went through four hip replacements over the years. She went into the hospital a fortnight ago, but there was no thought of any terminal problem. Yet following an infection, on the seventh day, she died, in the arms of her son."

Her son, Christopher Buckley, added "Sixty-five years of smoking cigarettes, with attendant problems of circulation, had taken their toll. A few days before, an operation to install a stent [into her leg] ... went wrong, and a mortal infection set in."
