= Superheroes: Fashion and Fantasy =

2008 art exhibition

Superheroes: Fashion and Fantasy was an art exhibition held 7 May - 1 September 2008 at the Metropolitan Museum of Art featuring clothing inspired by superhero costuming, along with actual costumes from superhero films. Sponsored by Giorgio Armani, the exhibit was curated by Andrew Bolton (supervised by Harold Koda) of the Costume Center, and author Michael Chabon wrote material for the exhibition catalog. Backdrops for the exhibition were derived from Alex Ross's Justice, Jamie Rama, Nathan Crowley, Dermot Power, Gary Frank, and photographs of Thomas Jane as The Punisher, Nicolas Cage as Ghost Rider, and Michelle Pfeiffer as Catwoman.

== Contents ==
The exhibition included many notable comicbook issues, mostly on loan from Michael E. Uslan and Metropolis Collectibles, including some of the most iconic costume imagery, such as Action Comics #1 (the first appearance of Superman), Amazing Fantasy #15 (the first appearance of Spider-Man), and The Amazing Spider-Man #252 (a revamped version of the previous cover featuring the first use of the black costume in The Amazing Spider-Man series, having previously appeared on the cover of Marvel Super Heroes Secret Wars #8, The Amazing Spider-Man #129 (the first appearance of The Punisher), The Incredible Hulk #1, Tales of Suspense #39 (first appearance of Iron Man), The X-Men #1, Sensation Comics #1 (first appearance of Wonder Woman), Captain America Comics #1, Batman #42 (featuring the Catwoman), Detective Comics #33 (featuring Batman's cape), Flash Comics #1 (first appearance of The Flash (Jay Garrick)), Marvel Spotlight #5 (first appearance of Ghost Rider), and The Fantastic Four #51 (an iconic image of The Thing).

The actual movie costumes featured were that worn by Christopher Reeve as the title role in Superman designed by Yvonne Blake, Rebecca Romijn as Mystique in X-Men: The Last Stand designed by Gordon J. Smith, Tobey Maguire as the title role in Spider-Man 3 designed by James Acheson, Lynda Carter as the television Wonder Woman designed by Donfeld, Christian Bale as the Batman in The Dark Knight designed by Lindy Hemming, Robert Downey Jr. as Iron Man in Iron Man designed by Adi Granov and Phil Saunders.

The main focus of the exhibit is how fashion designers have taken inspiration from superhero artwork. The designers comprise Bernard Willhelm, House of Moschino, Spyder Active Sports, Jean-Paul Gaultier, Thierry Mugler, Julien Macdonald, Giorgio Armani, John Galliano, House of Dior, Rick Owens, Pierre Cardin, House of Balenciaga and Nicolas Ghesquière, Gareth Pugh, Alexander McQueen, As Four, Walter Van Beirendock, Dolce & Gabbana, Descente Ltd., Speedo Fastskin, Hussain Chalayan, Atair Aerospace, and Dava J. Newman.

== Reception ==
Cathy Horyn in The New York Times's dismissed the exhibition as "camp" (which the Met would later use as a fashion exhibition theme) as well as criticizing the paucity of examples from the 1960s and 1970s and the inclusion of only two American designers, but she compares it to the negative reception Thierry Mugler received for his metal and plastic armor that exposed women's most vulnerable body parts. Layla Halabian in The Fader called it "a weird high school prom." Popsugar called it "incredibly creative."
