= AngloMania: Tradition and Transgression in British Fashion =

Exhibition at the Metropolitan Museum of Art

AngloMania: Tradition and Transgression in British Fashion was an exhibition curated by Andrew Bolton at the Metropolitan Museum of Art that ran from May 3 to September 4, 2006. The exhibition featured fashion from throughout Europe in the eighteenth-century that was influenced directly by British attitudes, ideas, and trends. However, these were not accurate depictions of British fashion, but idealized depictions of "a nation's notorious vanity, a romance with itself, and the eccentric desire of English designers to re-establish the establishment." The exhibit is composed of nine "theatrical installations containing clothed mannequins and paintings" that contrasted historical and modern aspects of fashion.

== Featured artists ==
The exhibit features works of designers Richard Anderson, Christopher Bailey, Manolo Blahnik, Carlo Brandelli, Ozwald Boateng, Hussein Chalayan, Simon Costin, John Galliano, Richard James, Stephen Jones, Shaun Leane, Stella McCartney, Alexander McQueen, Paul Smith, Philip Treacy, and Vivienne Westwood. The pieces of clothing presented in the exhibition "will be styled as a series of thematic vignettes that reflect the history, function, and decoration of the Museum's English Period Rooms."

The exhibit shows representations of Englishness by juxtaposing historical costume with late 20th- and early 21st-century fashions. Through the lens of fashion, "AngloMania" examines aspects of English culture—such as class, sport, royalty, eccentricity, the English gentleman, and the English country garden— that has fueled the European and American imagination.

Anglomania: Tradition and Transgression in British Fashion was a catalog as well as an exhibit of all the pieces that express the duality of English style and ideals.

== The exhibit ==
=== Vignettes ===
The entryway to the exhibit is a large Union Jack curtain being pulled open by two mannequins. On the left is a historically dressed mannequin in a red coat uniform. To the right is a modern mannequin dressed in punk styled clothing. This shift introduces the juxtaposition displayed in the exhibit between historical and modern pieces.

The first vignette, "The English Garden," was staged in The Kirklinton Park Dining Room, introducing pompadoured mannequins in 18th and 19th-century gowns, adorned with orchid themed hats by Phillip Treachy. A cropped pink rosette dress by Hussein Chalyan was set to center stage. The room was softly lit and accented with old mirrors.

"The Gentlemen's Club" establishes the juxtaposition of historical and modern fashion and ideals as it depicts the different "stylish Englishman's persona." Mannequins dressed in punk styles with metal mohawks intertwined with traditional bespoke suits were set in a neoclassical dining room in order to show this drastic contrast.

"The Hunt" vignette, leading into "The Hunt Ball," showcased a woman on horseback in a "Trench Coat Dress" - lilac silk faille lined by Christopher Bailey for Burberry. What followed was a room representing British sport and how "class" previously determined the sport played, with "riding and fox hunting for aristocrats, cricket for the bourgeoisie and soccer for the masses." Designers John Galliano, Westwood, and Stephen Jones parodied the brutality of fox hunting with blood-spattered fox fur muffs and hoods.

=== Pieces ===
In the Anglomania: Tradition and Transgression in British Fashion catalog, the cover is of a frock coat, circa 1966. This coat was designed for David Bowie by Alexander McQueen. McQueen took inspiration for this piece from John Bull, the personification of the United Kingdom.

"Incubus Necklace" is a piece of glass vials filled with bodily fluids. The bottles were engraved with "Vice and Virtue."

Thomas Gainsborough's "Mrs. Grace Dalrymple Elliott" (1778) is an oil painting on canvas displayed in the exhibit. This painting is an example of one of the paintings displayed to add to the historical aspect of the fore mentioned juxtaposition.

"Portrait of a Noblewoman," (Late 16th Century, Gift of J. Pierpont Morgan). A painting showing a woman emulating The Virgin Queen's famous white makeup, elegant jewels, and opulent gowns.

The theme of the monarchy was explored through Vivienne Westwood's work, which included an aquatic-themed dress, tweed crown, cape, corset, and laced "Rocking Horse" shoes.

Class and domestic service is the theme of the Cassiobury Park Staircase from Hertfordshire which contrasts a 1880s court gown with tattered, ragged dresses by Hussein Chalayan. The court gown was worn to the court of Queen Victoria and comprises an elaborate eleven-foot train with floral motifs that reflect the foliate carving of the staircase. Recalling the 18th- and 19th-century practice of servants wearing their employers' hand-me-downs, Chalayan's dresses are made up of several layers of second-hand garments and elements from his own repertoire, such as buried and distressed garments.

Ball Gown: Maria Luisa Black Silk Taffeta Gown by John Galliano for Christian Dior.
