= Camp: Notes on Fashion =

Exhibition at the Metropolitan Museum of Art

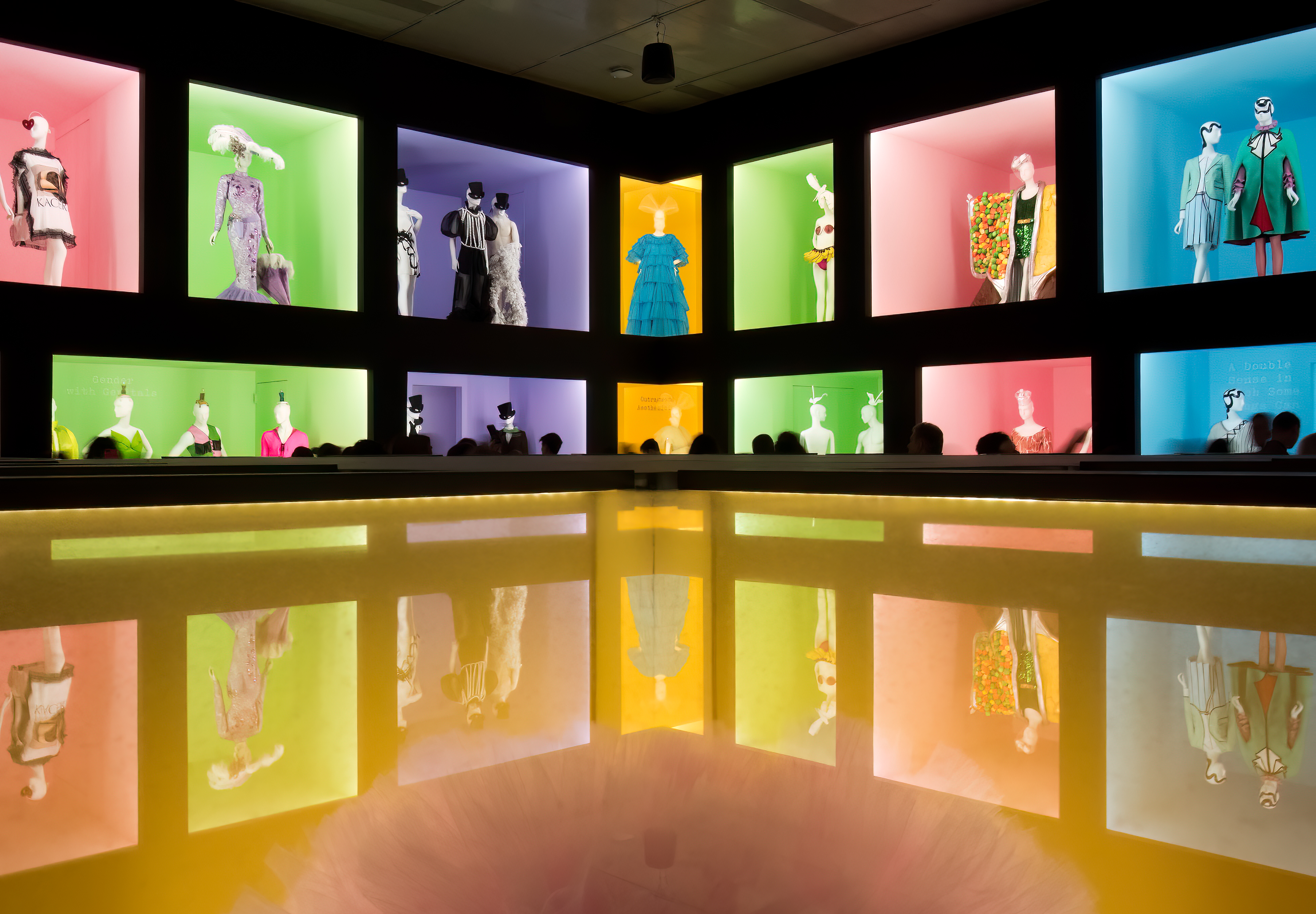
Colorful displays of clothing in the Camp: Notes on Fashion exhibition

Camp: Notes on Fashion was the 2019 high fashion art exhibition of the Anna Wintour Costume Center, a wing of the Metropolitan Museum of Art in New York that houses the collection of the Costume Institute.

The exhibition focused on the fashion style of camp, an aesthetic style and sensibility that regards something as appealing because of its bad taste and ironic value. The style of camp has been a part of fashion since around the 1960s. This creative style of camp has been used by people like Cher and Donatella Versace, and was worn at the 2019 met gala by celebrities like Harry Styles and Kim Kardashian. The visual style is closely associated with gay culture. It ran from May 8 through September 9, 2019, and was preceded by the annual Costume Institute Gala, an annual fundraising gala benefiting the Costume Institute, and considered to be the fashion industry's biggest and most prestigious yearly event, on May 6. Each year's gala celebrates the theme of that year's exhibition, and the exhibition sets the tone for the formal dress of the night.

== Costume Institute's annual exhibitions ==
The Costume Institute at the Metropolitan Museum of Art inaugurates its annual exhibition with a formal benefit dinner at the Costume Institute Gala, also known as the Met Gala. The gala for the 2019 exhibition took place on May 6, 2019. The co-chairs for the Gala were Lady Gaga, Alessandro Michele, Harry Styles, Serena Williams, and Anna Wintour. Co-chairs are chosen by the permanent Met Gala co-chair Anna Wintour, for each Met Gala. They are chosen greatly in part because of their contribution to and relation to the theme. Co-chairs are not always solely fashion-focused individuals. A diverse group, ranging from athletes, musicians, and actors within the entertainment industry are brought together in order to cultivate more dynamic ideas. Past galas have seen celebrities wear outlandish and controversial outfits. Of the co-chairs, Lady Gaga is well known for embodying the camp style, including her wearing of a dress made of raw meat at the 2010 MTV Video Music Awards.

== Background ==
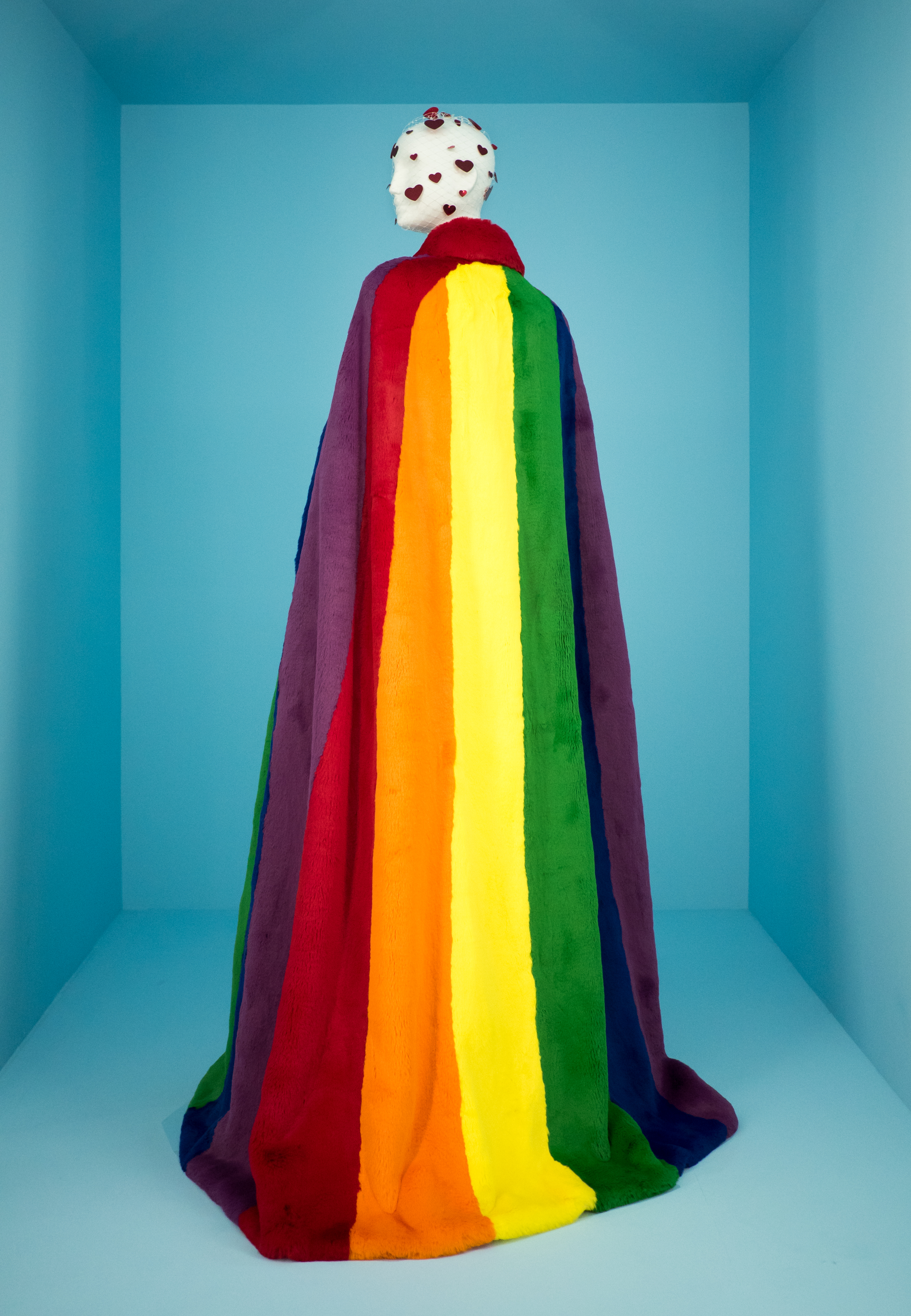
Rainbow cape by Christopher Bailey for Burberry

In Anna Wintour's Go Ask Anna, her weekly video series answering questions from fashion fans, she explained that Andrew Bolton, chief curator of the Costume Institute, chooses the theme, sometimes up to five years in advance. She also shared that her only advice was that the title of the show needed to be clear so "everybody understands it immediately".

The theme from the exhibit was announced as the Gala theme October 9, 2018. Andrew Bolton, the Wendy Yu Curator in Charge of the Costume Institute, framed the exhibition around Susan Sontag's 1964 essay "Notes on 'Camp'", which considers meanings and connotations of the word "camp". Her "influential" essay includes "58 points detailing the ways the concept of "camp" can be constructed." It arguably brought camp into the mainstream, and made Sontag a literary celebrity. Sontag wrote, "Indeed the essence of Camp is its love of the unnatural: of artifice and exaggeration."

Bolton found Sontag's observations of camp, the "love of the unnatural: of artifice and exaggeration ... style at the expense of content ... the triumph of the epicene style", "timely with what we are going through culturally and politically". Bolton notes that 'camp' embraces elements including "irony, humor, parody, pastiche, artifice, theatricality, excess, extravagance, nostalgia, and exaggeration". He added that the theme is timely, and "very relevant to the cultural conversation to look at what is often dismissed as empty frivolity but can be actually a very sophisticated and powerful political tool, especially for marginalized cultures." Bolton noted camp never lost its subversive element from the 1960s when the essay was written and used as a "private code primarily in the gay community".

Bolton traced camp back to the French verb se camper, to strike an exaggerated pose, its origins in the flamboyant posturing of the French court under Louis XIV. Louis XIV himself consolidated power by compelling noblemen to spend their wealth at Versailles on fashions and jewelry to adorn themselves while taking part in elaborate, mandatory social dances and faux battles. His gay younger brother, Philippe I, duc d'Orléans, was "in many ways the paradigm of camp", with his obsession with clothing and jewelry, and "besotted with his pretty male favorites". "Camp became the "ultimate expression" of Philippe I, Duke of Orléans, who "devoted his life to dancing and dressing up and although he was married twice he was flamboyantly gay.""

Author Andy Medhurst notes the definition has changed throughout history, "It was first a French verb ("to flaunt" or "posture"), then an adjective with a gay connotation in the 18th century, and most recently, a noun to describe exaggerated gestures and actions." Kareem Khubchandani, queer studies and performance studies professor at Tufts University, has said "Camp makes profane the things that are sacred and is a queer way of knowing."

The exhibition centered around camp. Camp has been defined in many different ways. Phillip Core, American artist, referred to camp by saying "The essence of dandyism consists of being obsessed with and knowledgeable about the limits of 'how far one can go too far.'" Kenneth Williams, English actor, said that "Camp is a great jewel, 22 carats."

== Exhibition design ==
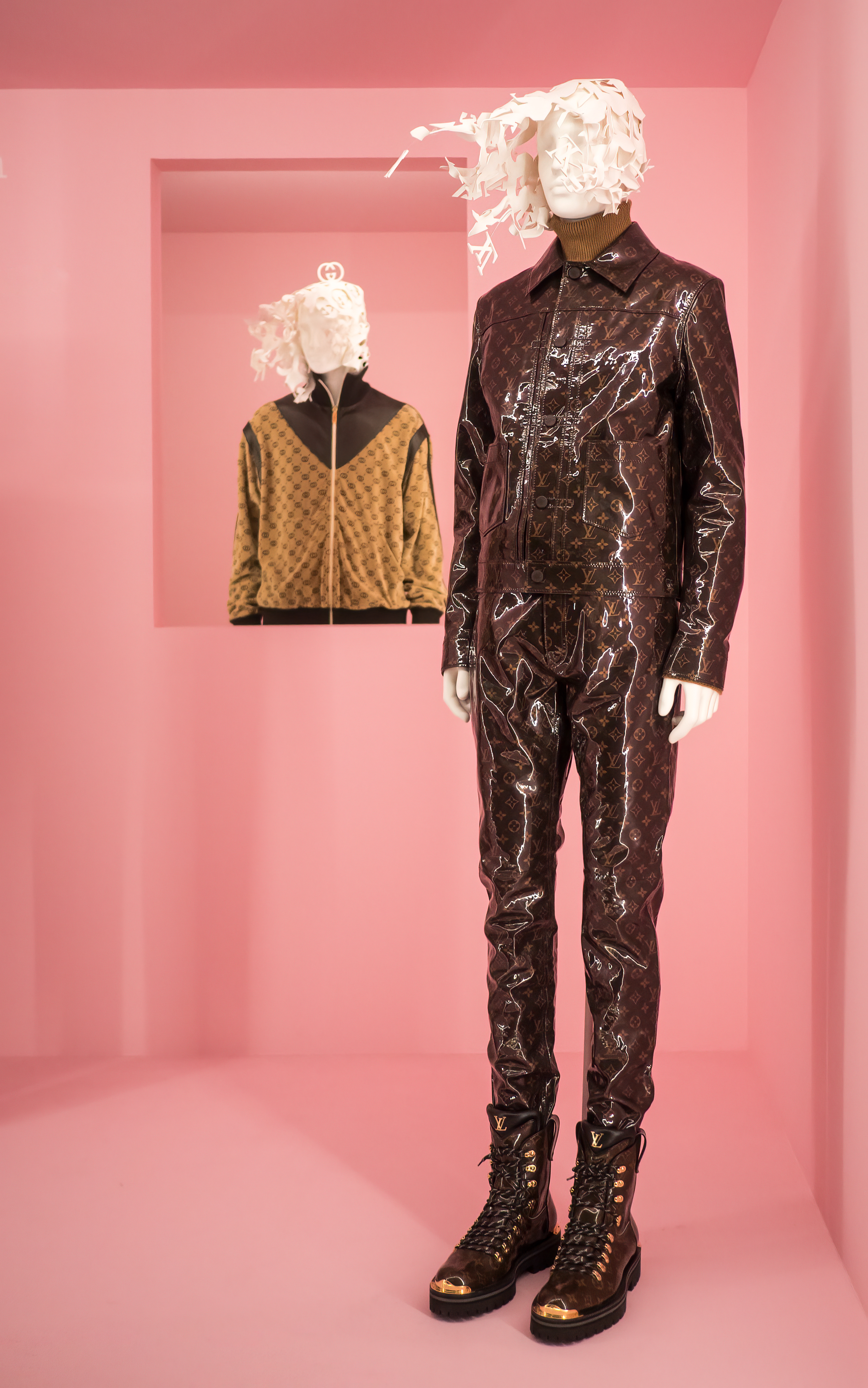
Left by Gucci/Dapper Dan, 2018. Right by Louis Vuitton/Kim Jones, autumn/winter 2018–19

The exhibition is presented in the Met Fifth Avenue's Iris and B. Gerald Cantor Exhibition Hall, and was underwritten by Gucci, whose creative director Alessandro Michele, said Sontag's essay "perfectly expresses what camp truly means to me: the unique ability of combining high art and pop culture". The Metropolitan Museum's director, Max Hollein stated: "Camp's disruptive nature and subversion of modern aesthetic values has often been trivialized, but this exhibition will reveal its profound influence on both high art and popular culture." Sontag's essay is on display next to a photo of her and is part of the exhibition.

The exhibit, designed by the scenographer Jan Versweyveld, has 175 pieces of fashion including menswear, womenswear, and 75 sculptures, paintings and drawings relating to the theme. The pieces date back as early as the 1600s. The show is presented in two parts, starting with the origins of camp as a concept, with Sontag as a ghost narrator, Bolton finds camp in the Stonewall riots, and used in LGBTQ communities. The two sections are physically designed apart with the first section featuring "narrow corridors with low ceilings," projecting a "clandestine underground" mood with Sontag "narrating in whispers."

The exhibit then uses 100 examples from the 1960s onward to show how camp has become more mainstream by examples in the collections by Balenciaga, Prada and Vetements, as well as Gucci. Bolton aims to portray how ubiquitous the concept of camp is with this exhibit manifest. The second half's structural design "is an open piazza," mirroring "mainstream acceptance". In all, around 37 fashion designers are represented, with 175 fashion pieces. Also on display is a full-length portrait of Oscar Wilde, spokesman for aestheticism and flamboyant fashion, in a frock coat.

As a soundtrack for the show, the camp anthem Judy Garland's "Over the Rainbow", her signature song from 1939's The Wizard of Oz, plays intermittently in both sections of the show. The Wizard of Oz version in the first section, and a recording shortly before her death plays in the second section. Garland is considered a gay icon, particularly because of this song.

== Critical reception ==
The exhibition received mixed critical reviews upon opening from publications including The New York Times, The Face, The Independent, and Fashionista. The New York Times claimed the exhibition was "the most idea-driven, conceptual, intellectual exhibition theme the Costume Institute has ever used" but criticized the lack of designers of color included in the exhibition. Clémence Michallon of The Independent praised Bolton's work, stating the exhibit is "entertaining and educative, and the attentive visitor will relish in the many sensibilities of camp. It’s a needed celebration." Fashionista also labelled the show "delightful" and "a visual feast for the ultimate fashion fan."

== Catalog ==
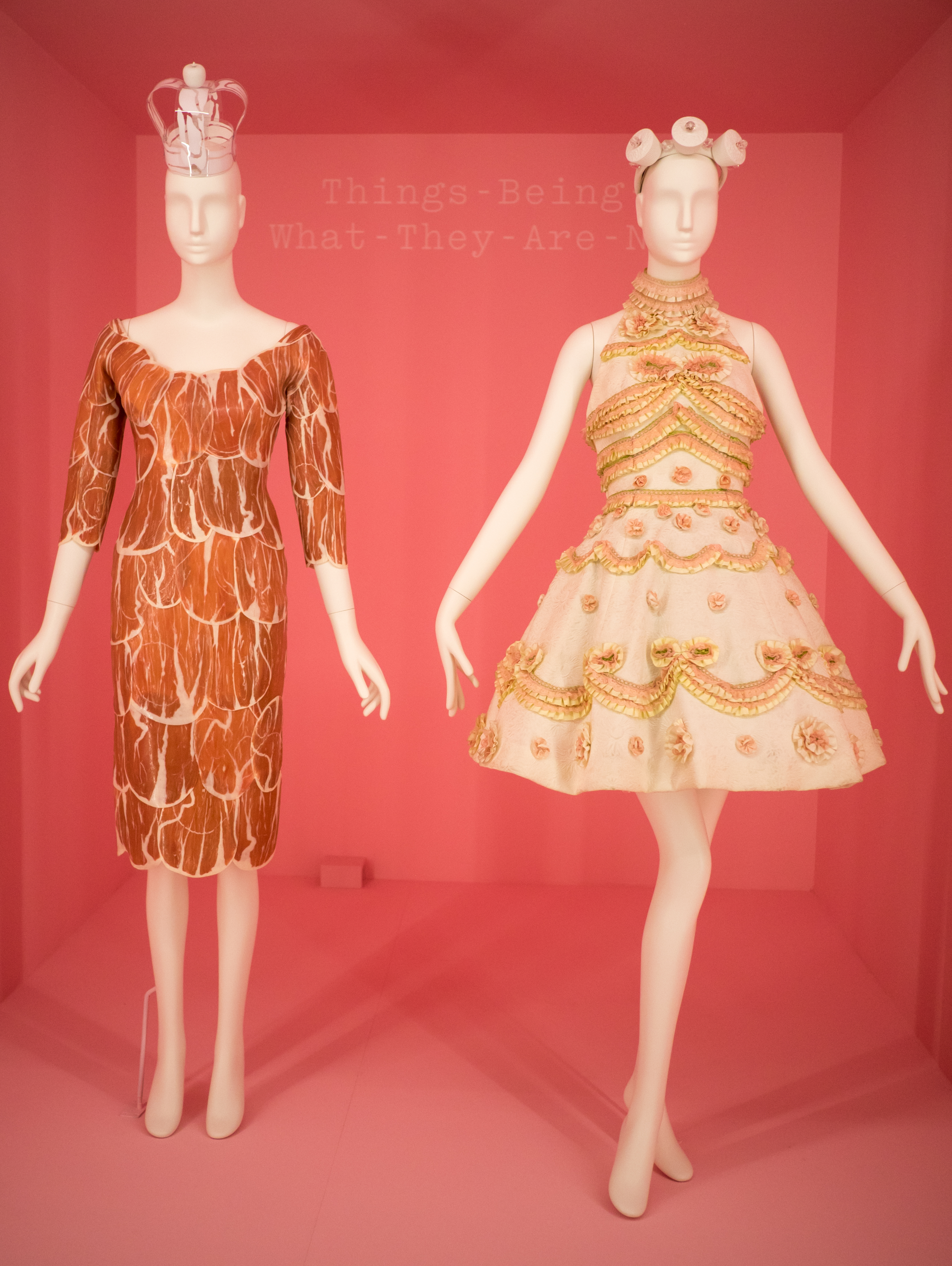
Left by Jeremy Scott, spring/summer 2011. Right by Christian Lacroix, late 1990s.

The exhibition catalog was published in two volumes and also adheres to the camp theme with its pale pink casing, and an engraved quote from Oscar Wilde, on the book's spine in gold: "One should either be a work of art or wear a work of art." The co-writers are Andrew Bolton, Karen Van Godtsenhoven, and Amanda Garfinkel. The catalog is in two chartreuse volumes of the history and modern applications of camp, including the full text of Susan Sontag's Notes on "Camp".

The first volume has scholar Fabio Cleto's comprehensive essay on camp followed by a visual history guide of camp sensibility. The second volume has an essay by Andrew Bolton, the Wendy Yu curator in charge of the Costume Institute, outlying inspirations and interpretations of camp for the exhibition. The second volume includes 160 images from photographer Johnny Dufort, each image is paired with a quote on camp.

== Gallery ==
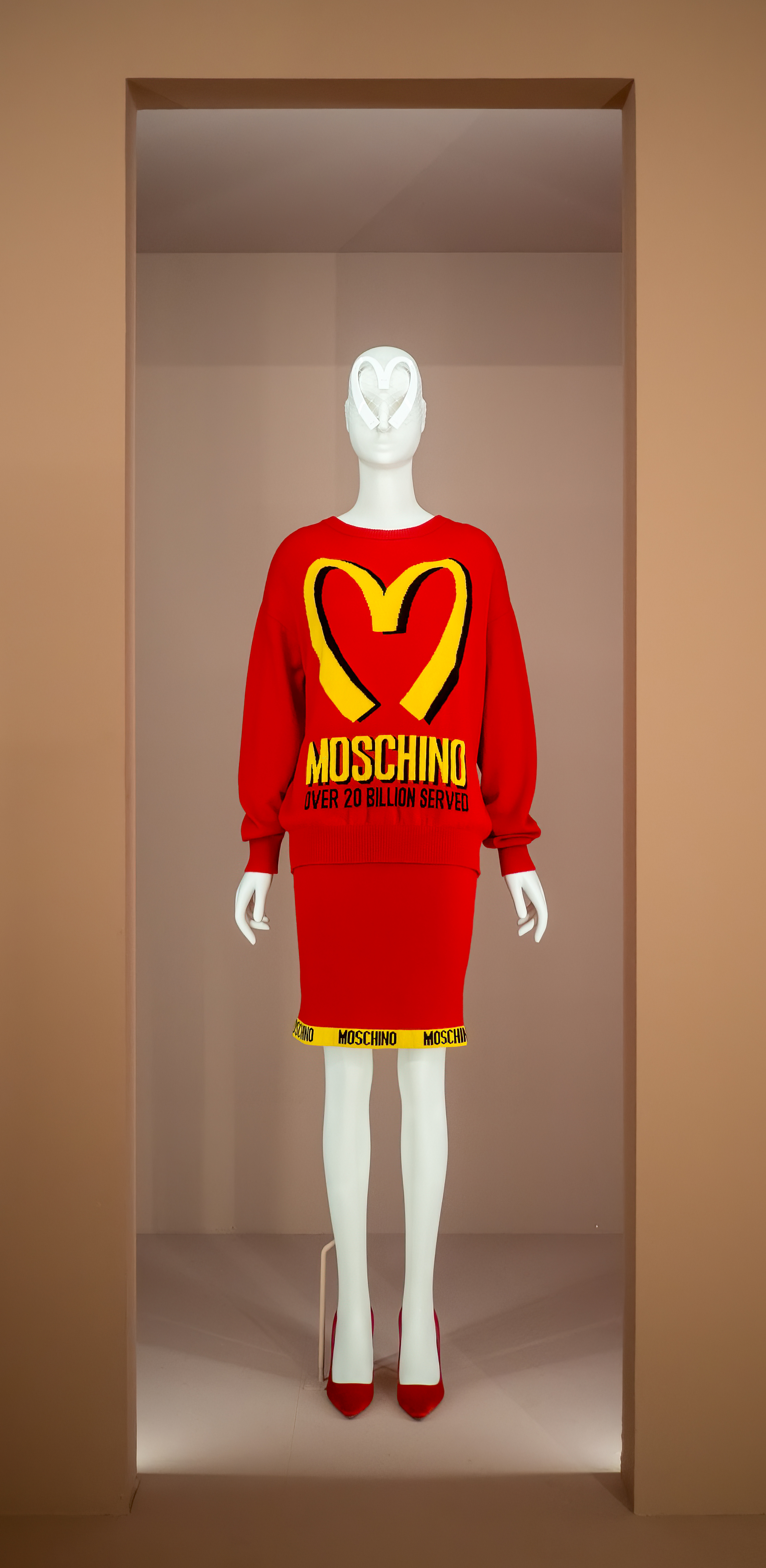

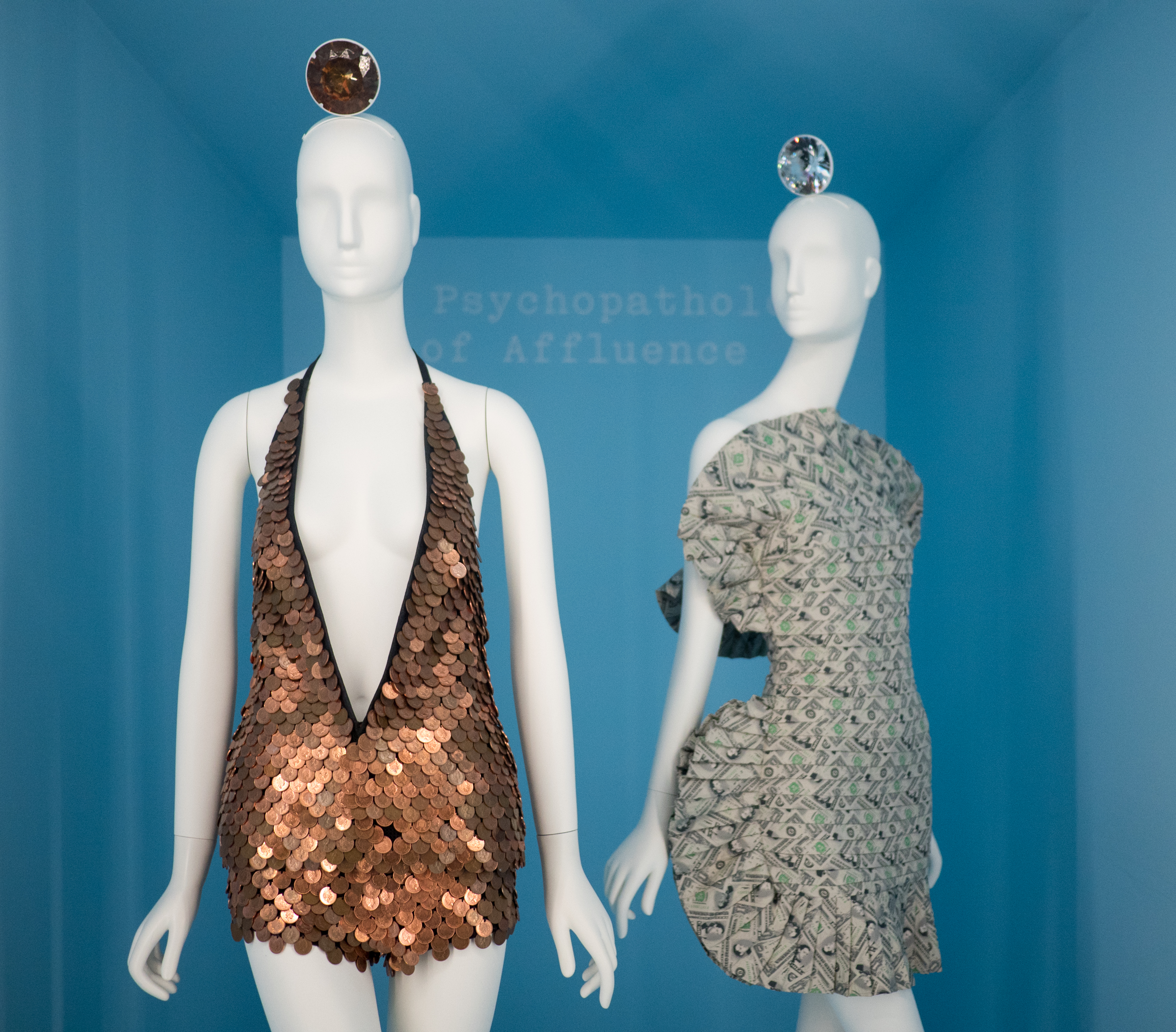

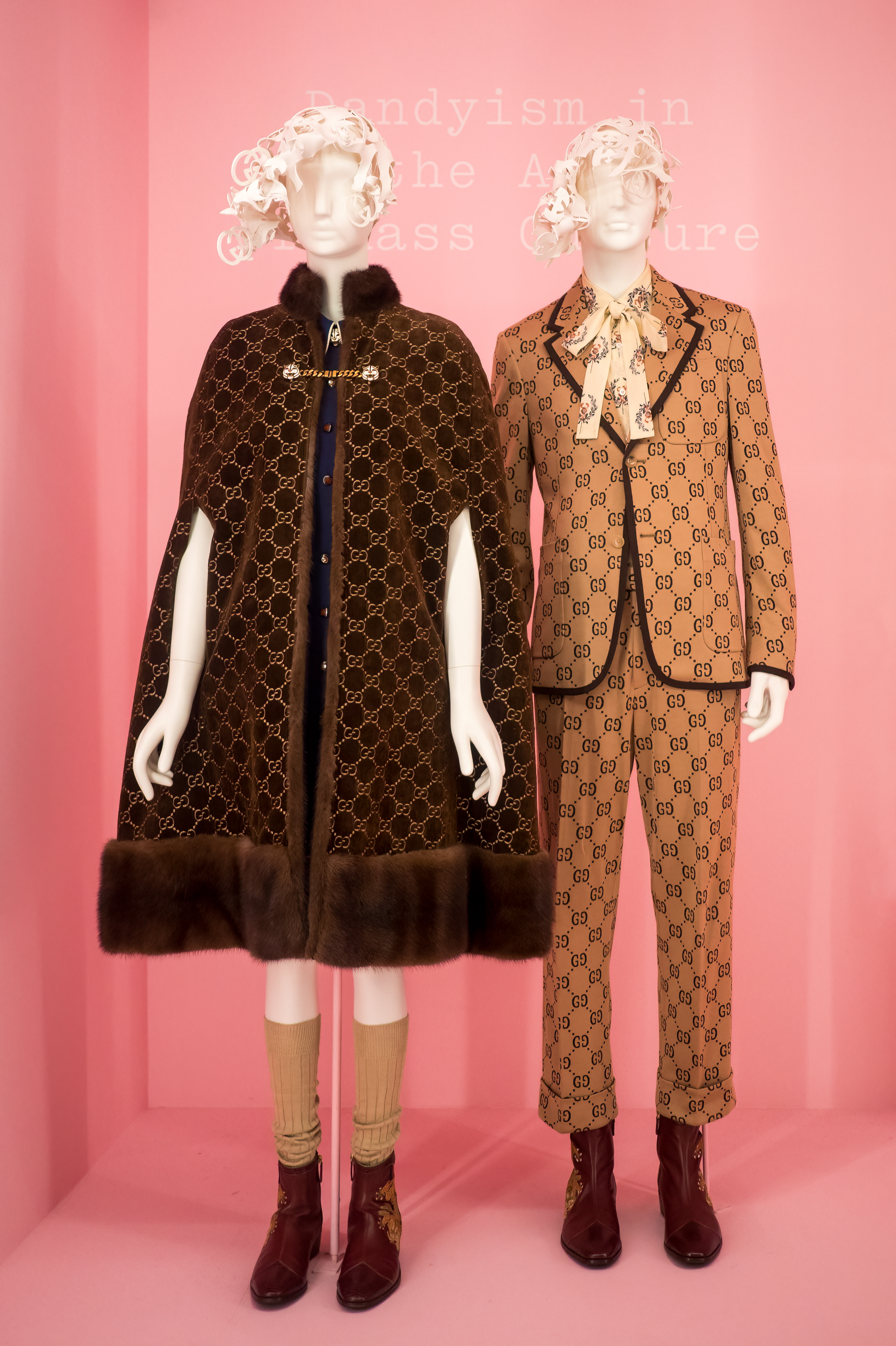

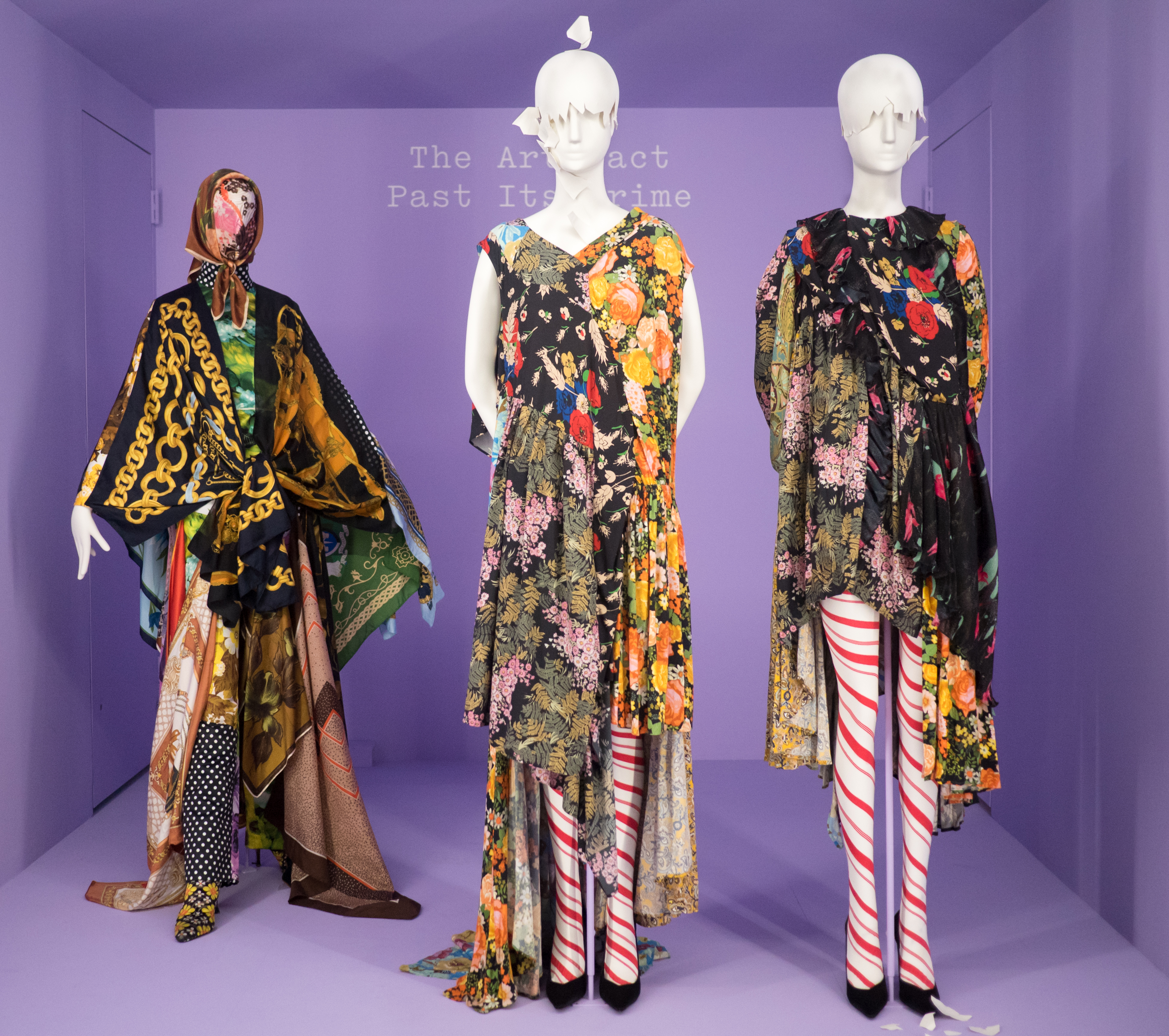

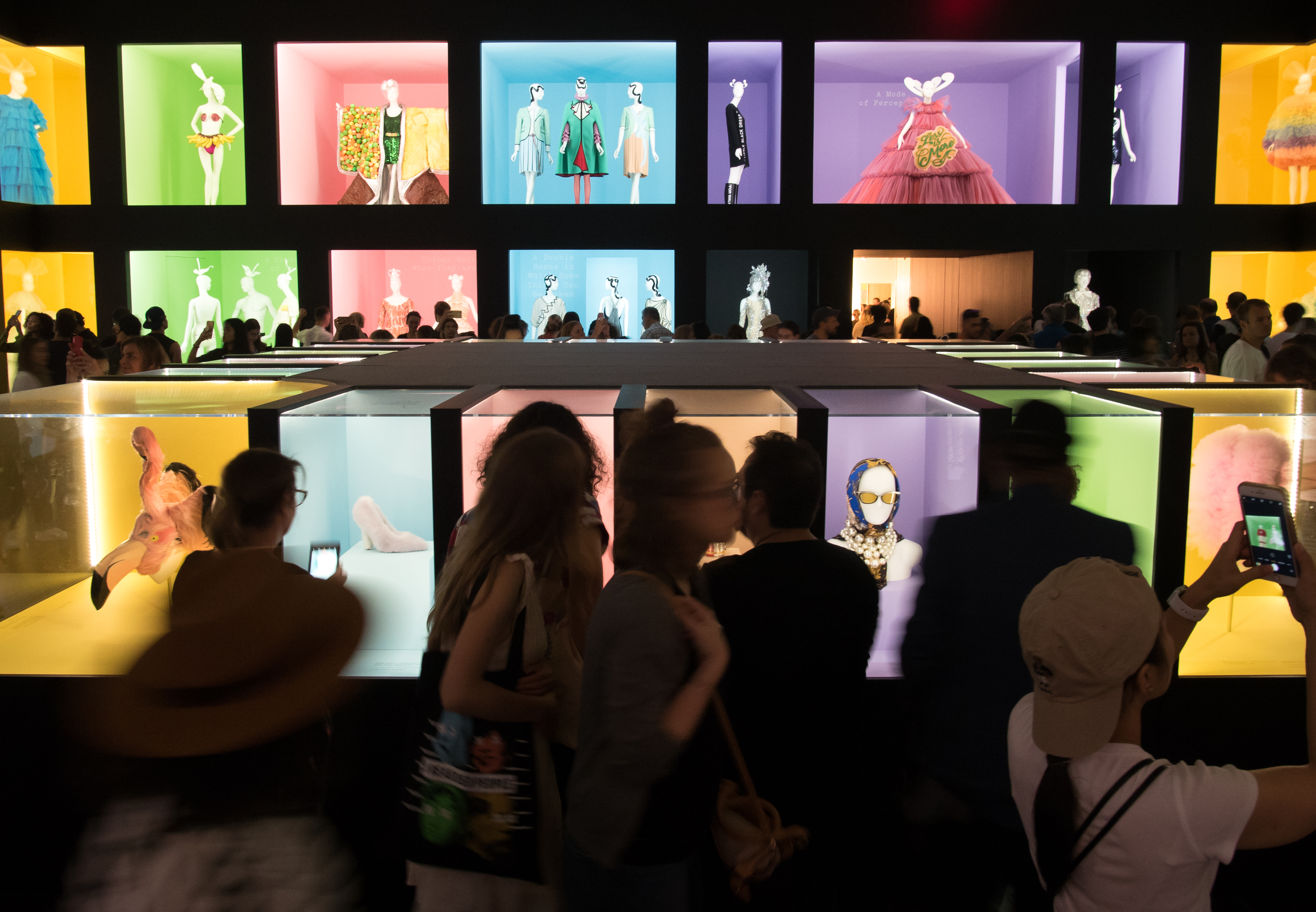

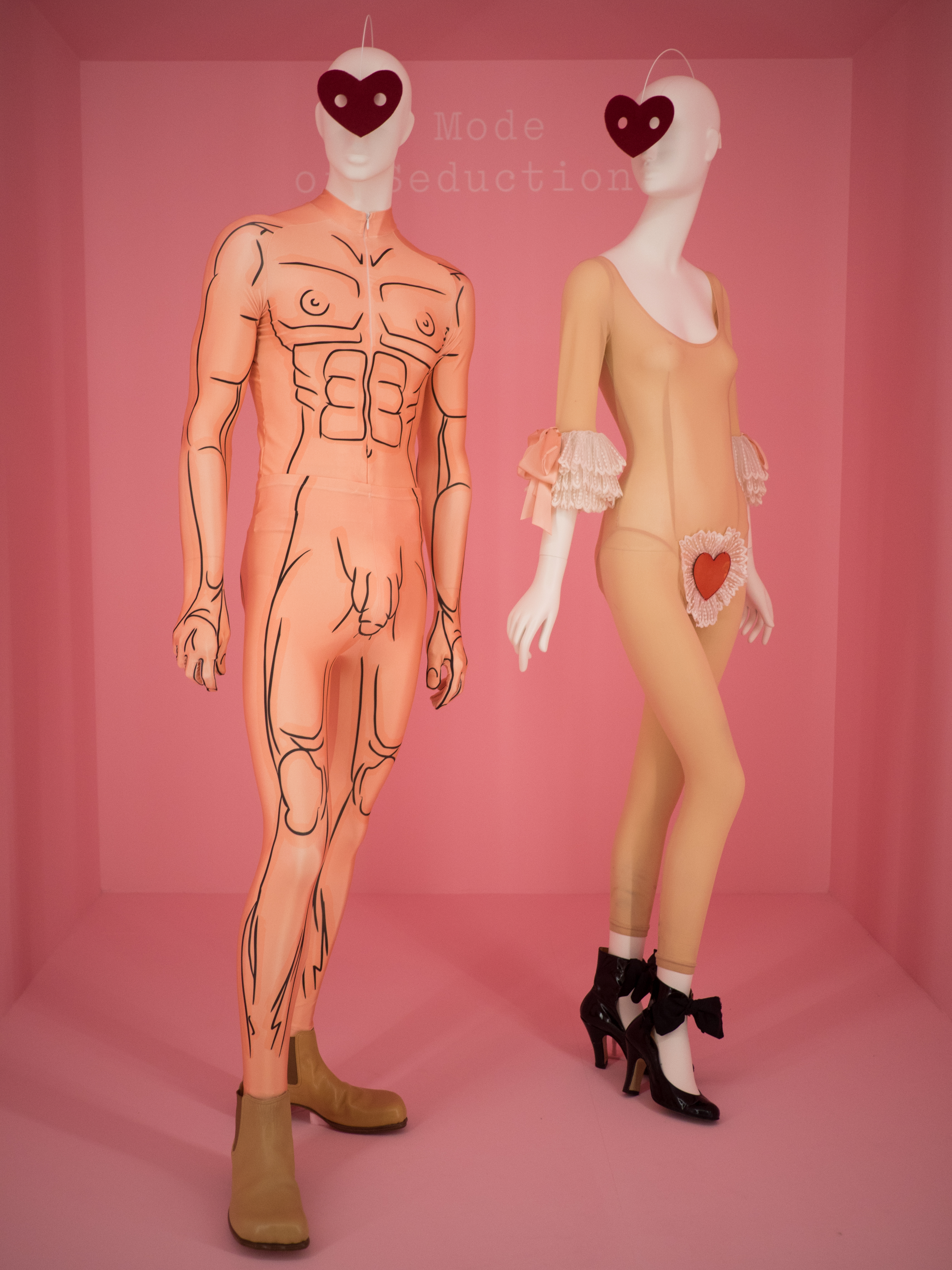

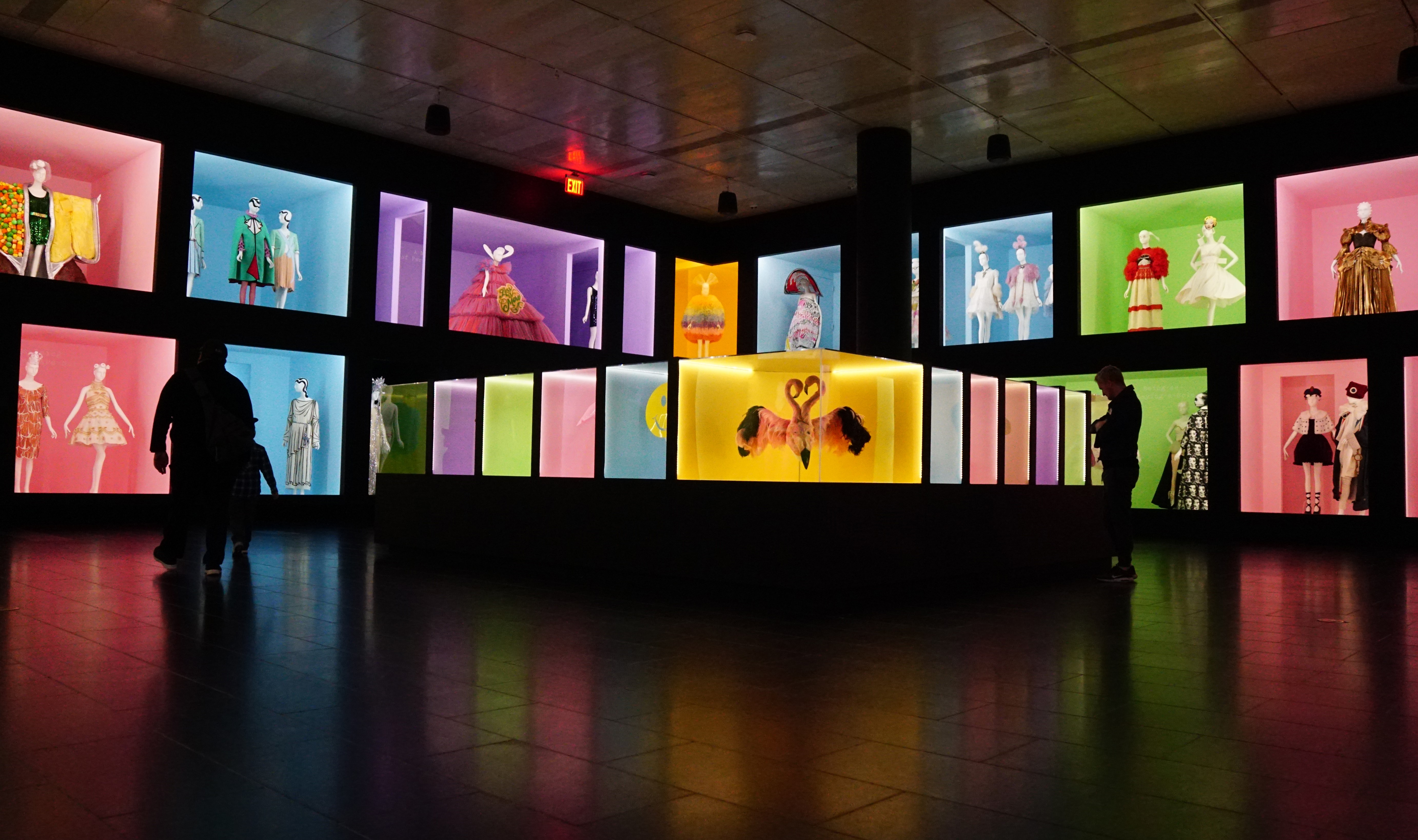

== See also ==
- Camp (1965 film)
- Polari
- Haute couture
