= American Woman: Fashioning a National Identity =

2010 museum exhibit

American Woman: Fashioning a National Identity was an exhibit at the Metropolitan Museum of Art in New York City, New York that ran from May 5 to August 15, 2010. This exhibition explored the evolution of the modern woman's image from the 1890s to the 1940s in the United States. Taking approximately nine months to complete, the goal of the exhibition was to create a "time machine" of women's clothing from the past to present. The exhibit was the first from the Costume Institute to incorporate pieces from the Brooklyn Museum Costume collection which had recently been transferred to the Met's holdings. The exhibition, consisting of a range of women's clothing from ball gowns to cycling suits, displayed the impact of "Gibson Girls", "Screen Sirens", and "Bohemians" on American women.

The annual Met Gala was held on Monday, May 3, 2010, just before the exhibition's opening.

One of the first galleries within the exhibition features "Heiress", a series of ball gowns of the Gilded Age from the 1890s by Charles Frederick Worth. The ball gowns were pioneered to be distributed throughout the world and were made to reflect elegance of the current era, especially in France. Charles Fredrick Worth designed the gowns to have a Crinoline, stiffened to make the skirt stand out so the woman could achieve the illusion of a small waist. During this time the body trend was that of a curvier figure, with a petite waist.

The "Gibson Girls" also from 1890, portrays a type that was of independent women with a cycling dress and bathing suits. The New Woman, more disconcerting of the two images at the time as she was seen as an example of change and disruption within the old patterns of social order, asking for the right to equal educational and work opportunities as well as progressive reform, sexual freedom and suffrage. Whilst the Gibson Girl took on many characteristics of the New Woman, she did so without involving herself in politics and thus did not appear to contemporaries at the time to be usurping traditionally masculine roles as the New Woman was deemed to. She therefore managed to stay within the boundaries of feminine roles without too much transgression.
