= China: Through the Looking Glass =

Exhibition at the Metropolitan Museum of Art

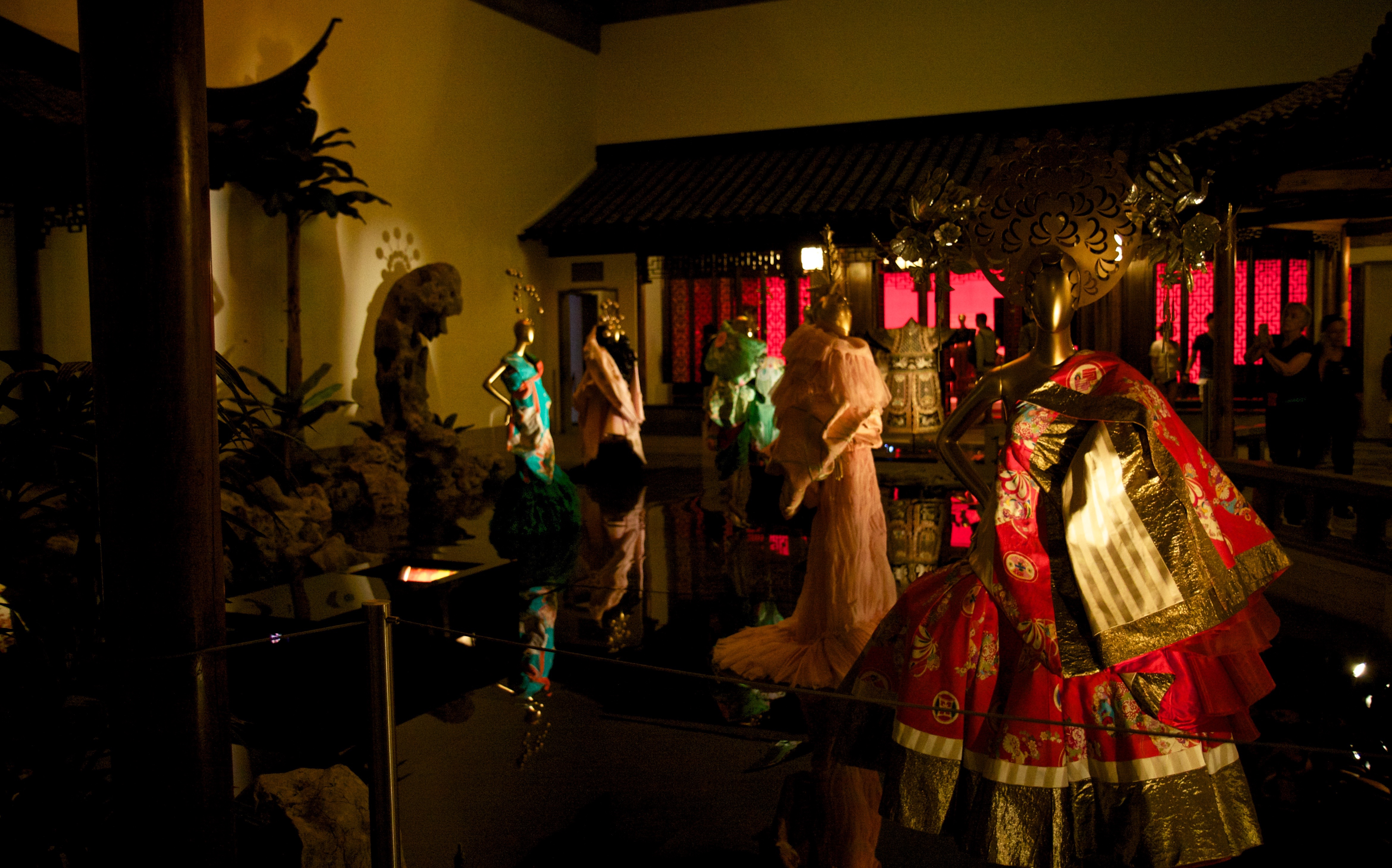
China: Through the Looking Glass at Metropolitan Museum of Art with fashion inspired by Chinese opera

China: Through the Looking Glass was a fashion and art exhibition held from May 7 through August 16, 2015, at the Metropolitan Museum of Art focusing on the impact of Chinese design on Western fashion over the centuries. It was curated by Andrew Bolton with support from Harold Koda. Nathan Crowley was responsible for production design.

Consisting of over 140 examples, each piece of this exhibit is said to embody "haute couture and avant-garde ready-to-wear alongside Chinese art." Alongside the exhibition, China was portrayed in cinematic forms to reveal how perceptions of the country are shaped by pop culture. The exhibit was extremely popular in New York City and resulted in record attendance for the museum, drawing more visitors than that of the previous record holder among popular Costume Institute exhibitions, Savage Beauty. Originally scheduled to run from 7 May to 16 August, it was extended through September 7 and stayed open through the night on its final weekend.

The exhibition inverted Orientalism, choosing to focus on "the East as authentic". The show "aims to readdress Edward Said's notion of Orientalism—a criticism of the West's depictions of the East as patronising and inauthentic."

A documentary film about the exhibition, The First Monday in May, was released in 2016 and is available on Netflix outside of the US.

== Gallery ==
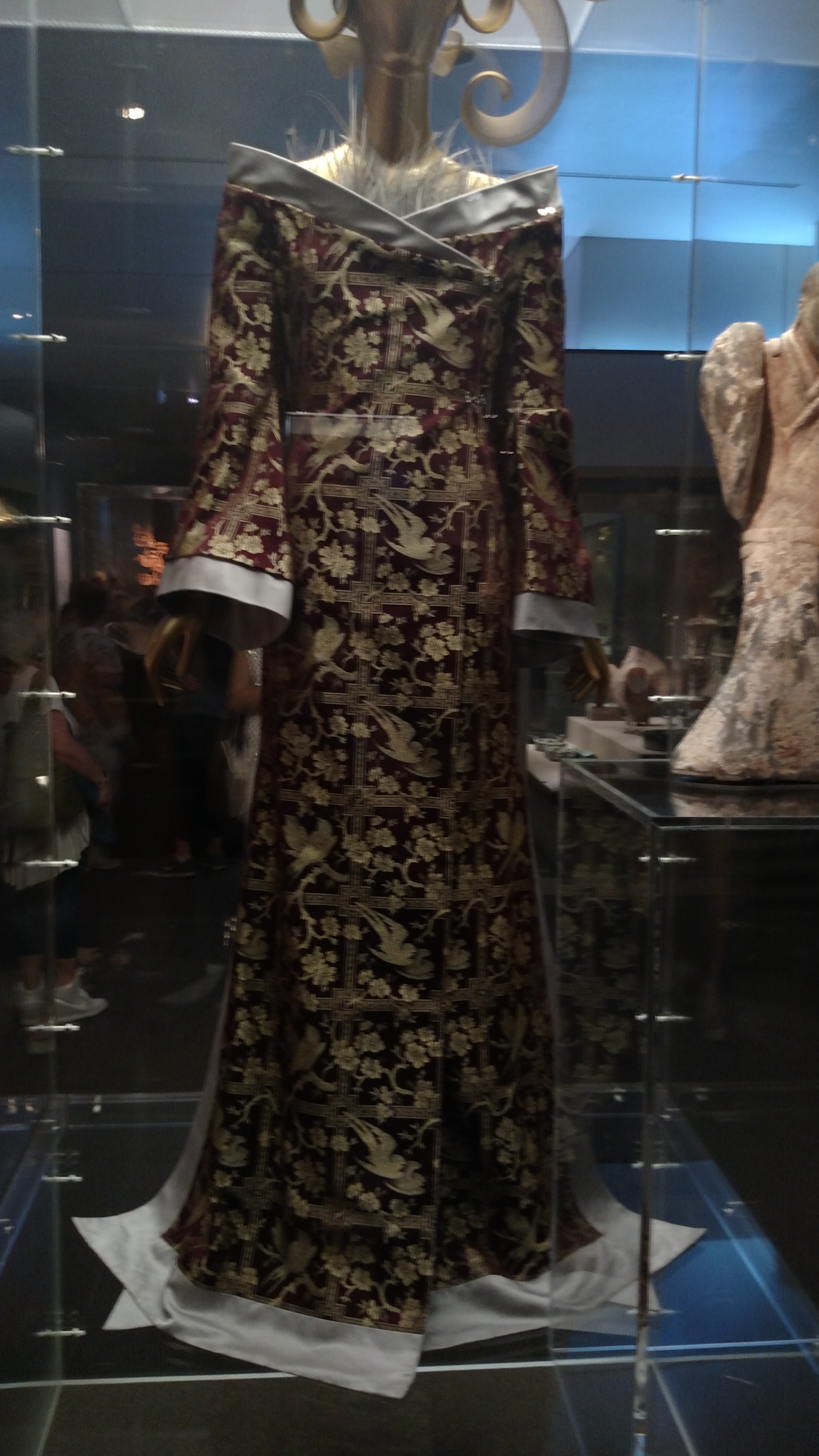
A dress by Alexander McQueen in the style of a traditional Chinese clothing; the gown is exhibited alongside Han dynasty ceramic figures

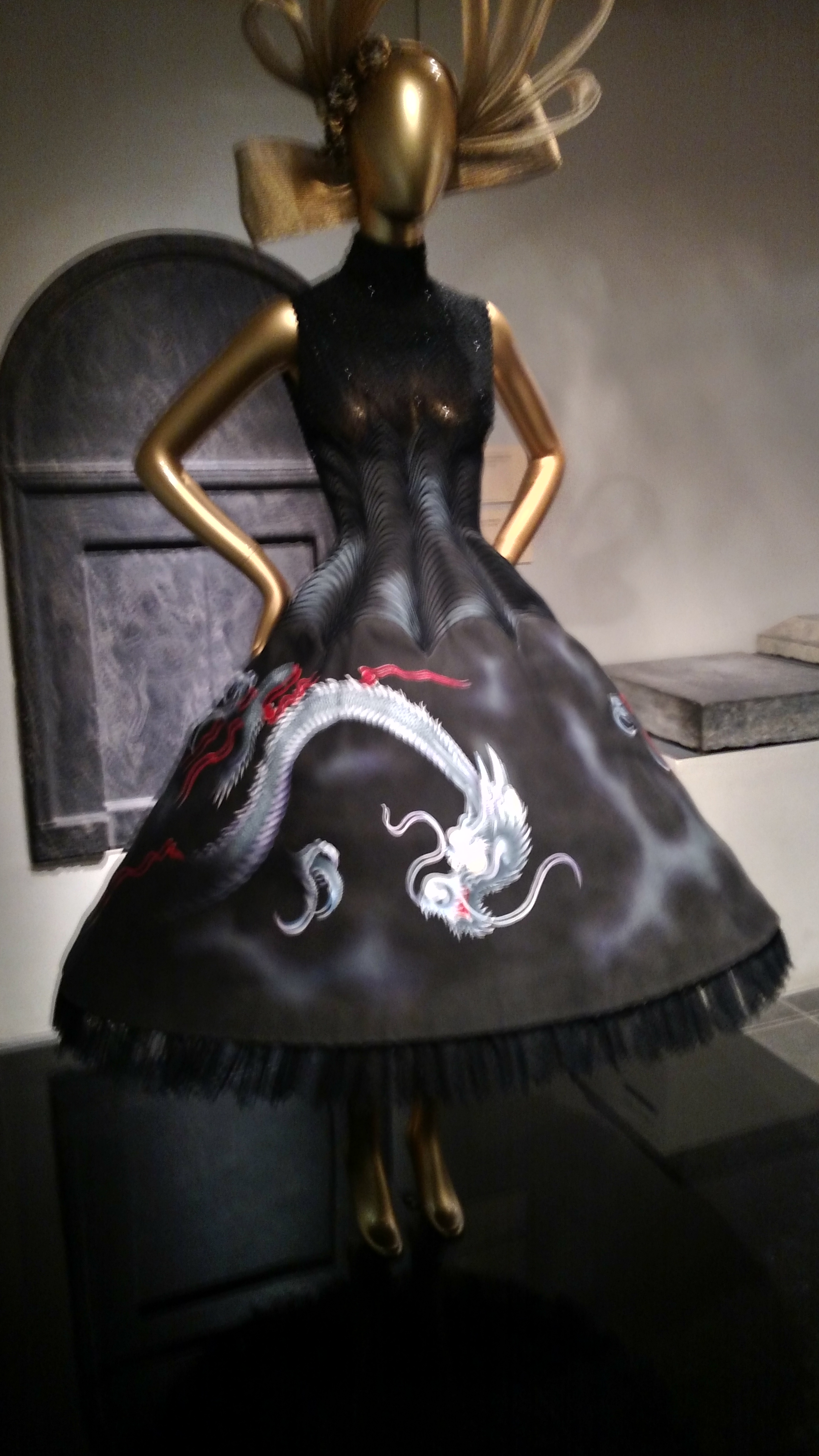
A Givenchy dragon gown

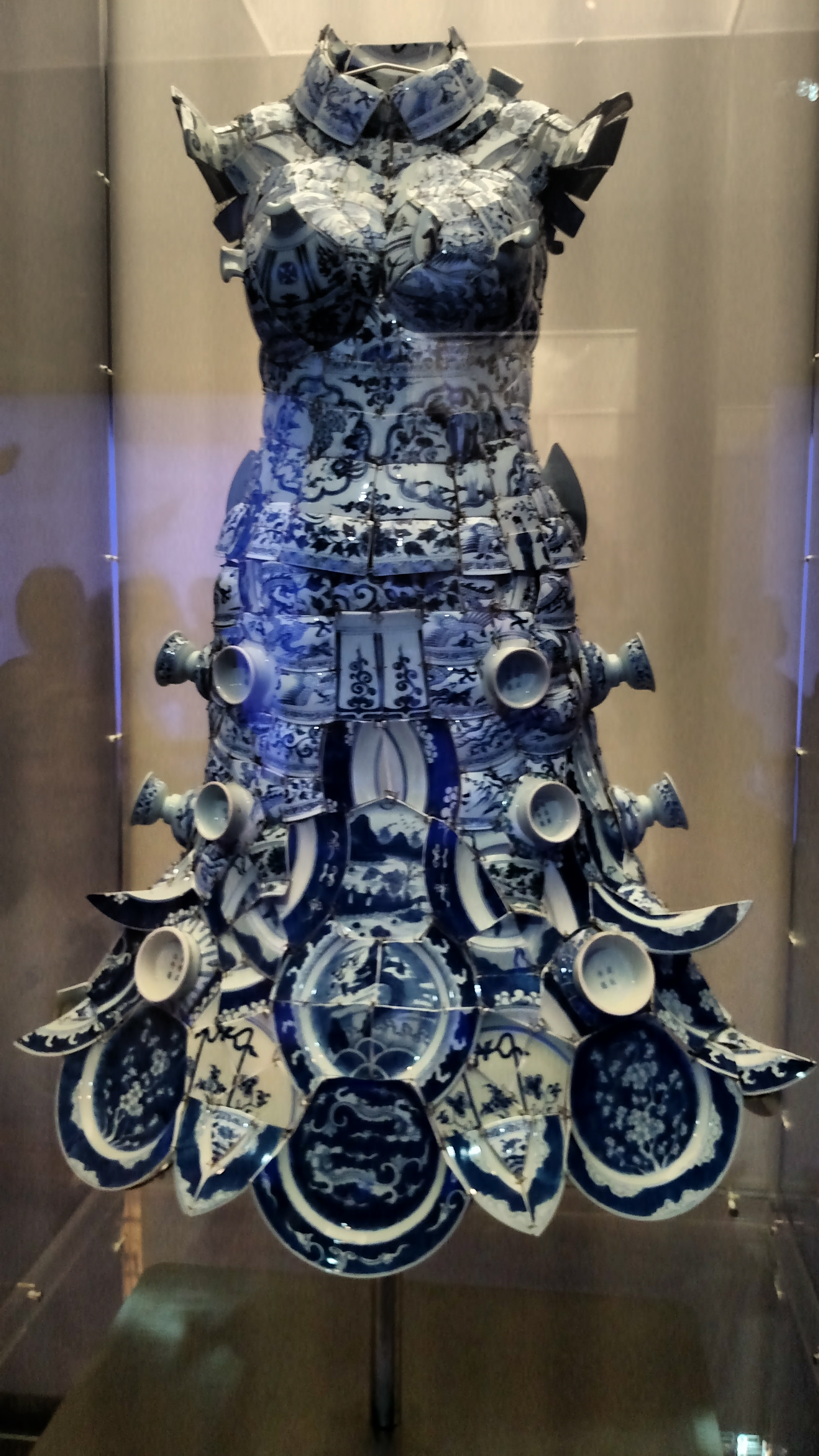
"The Weight of the Millennium", a dress by Li Xiaofeng, made entirely of porcelain pieces

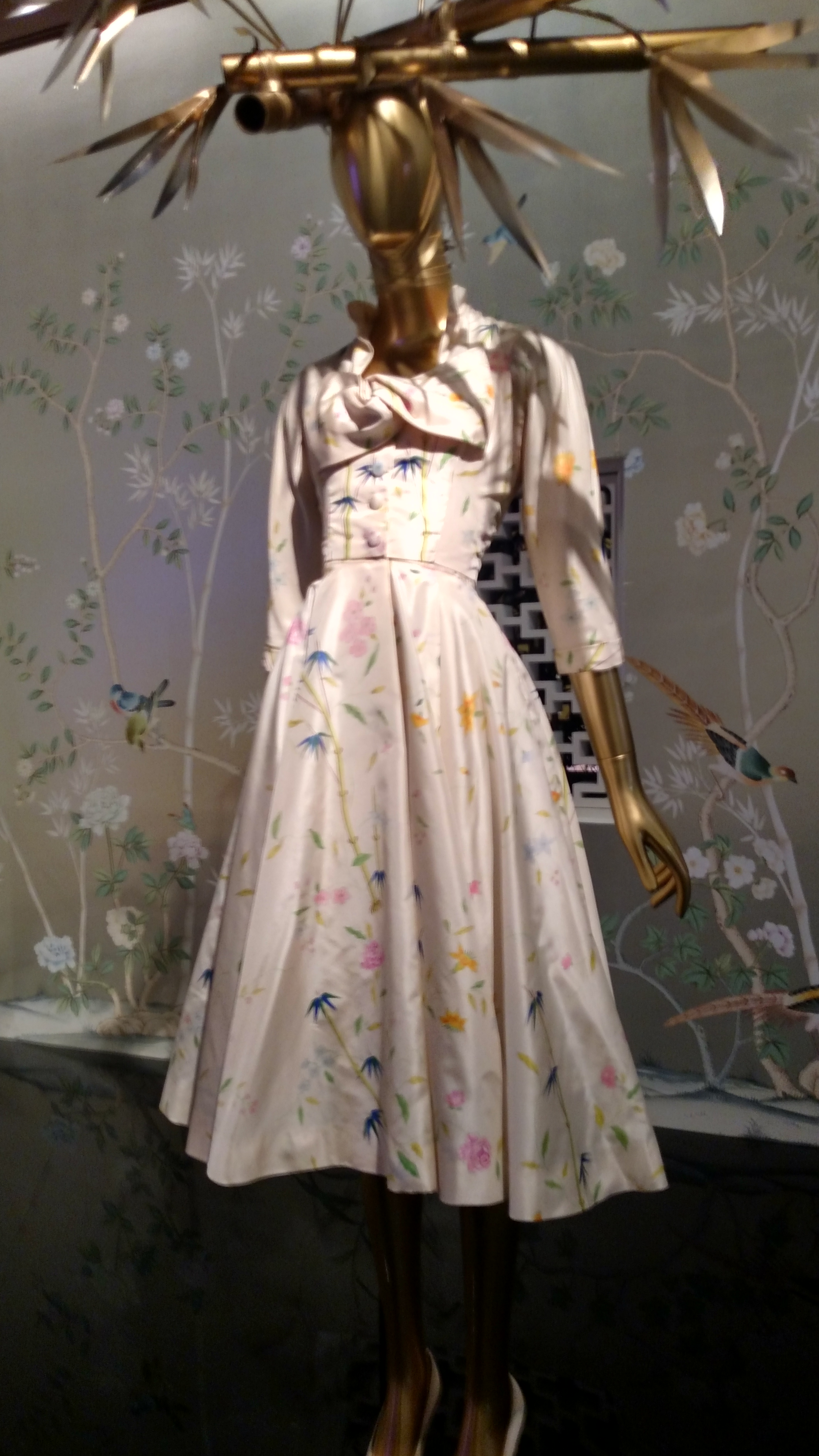
A Balenciaga dress with Chinese floral motif

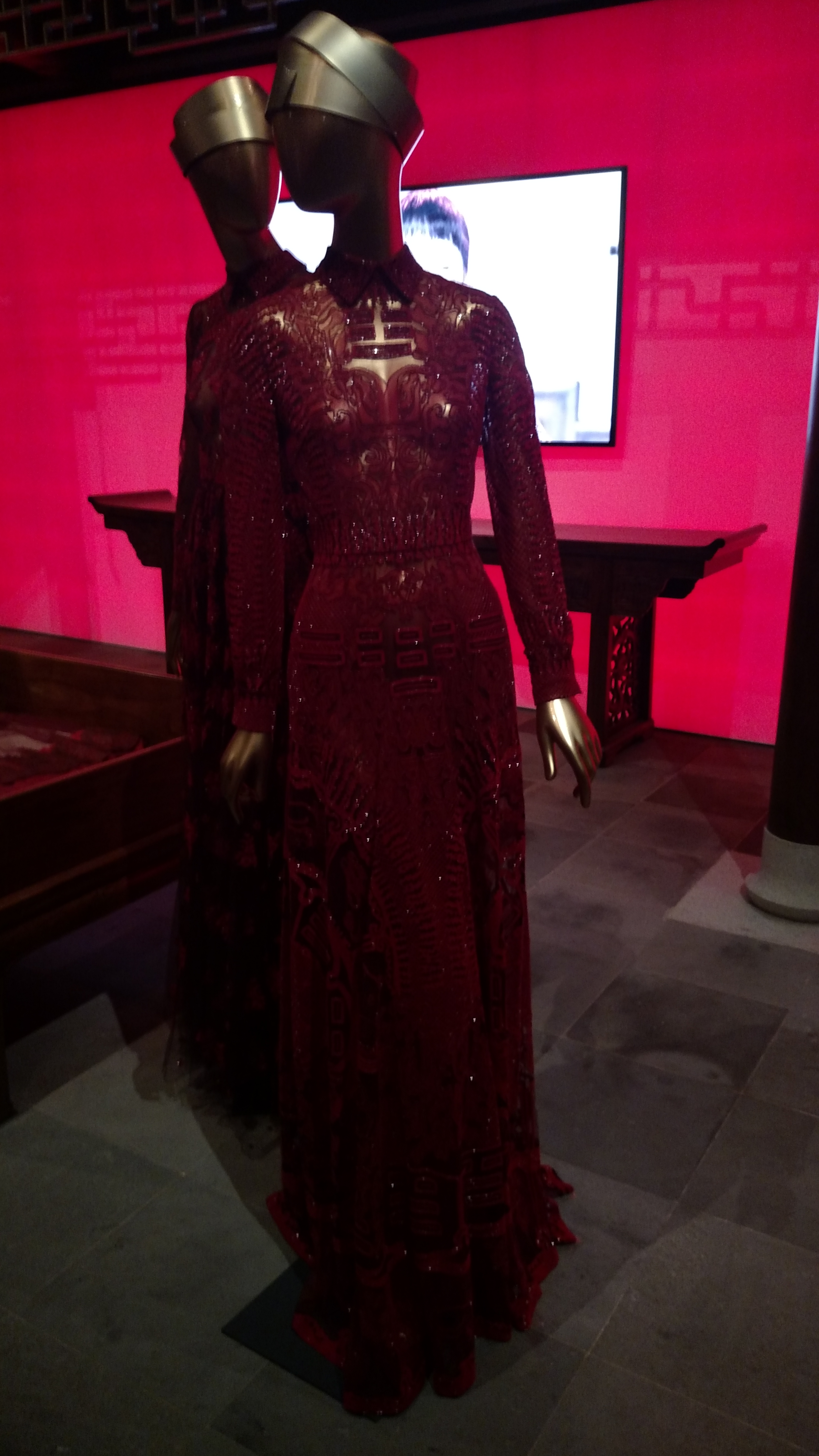
Evening dresses from Valentino, with Chinese symbolism

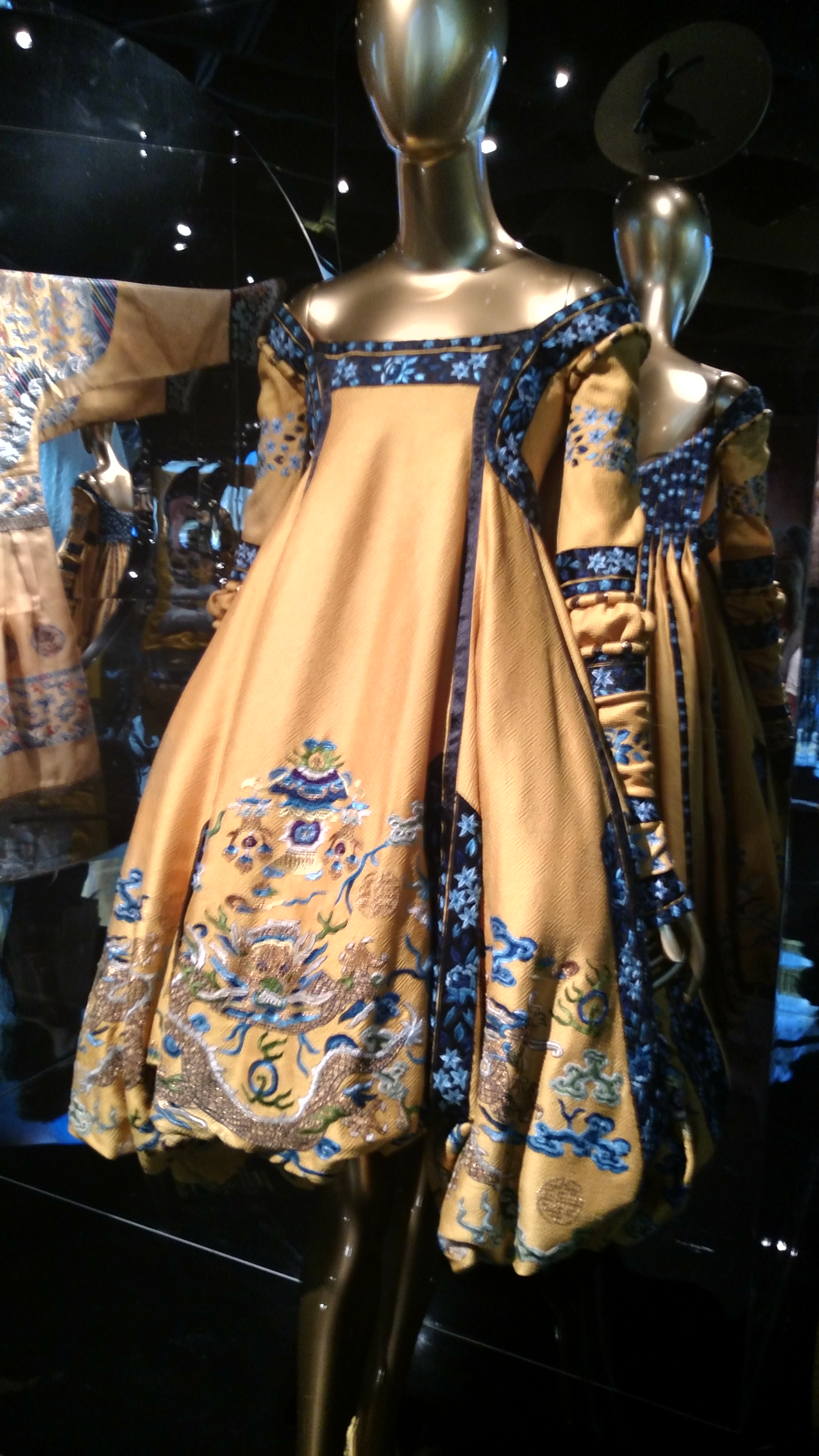
A gown infused with Eastern and Western aesthetics

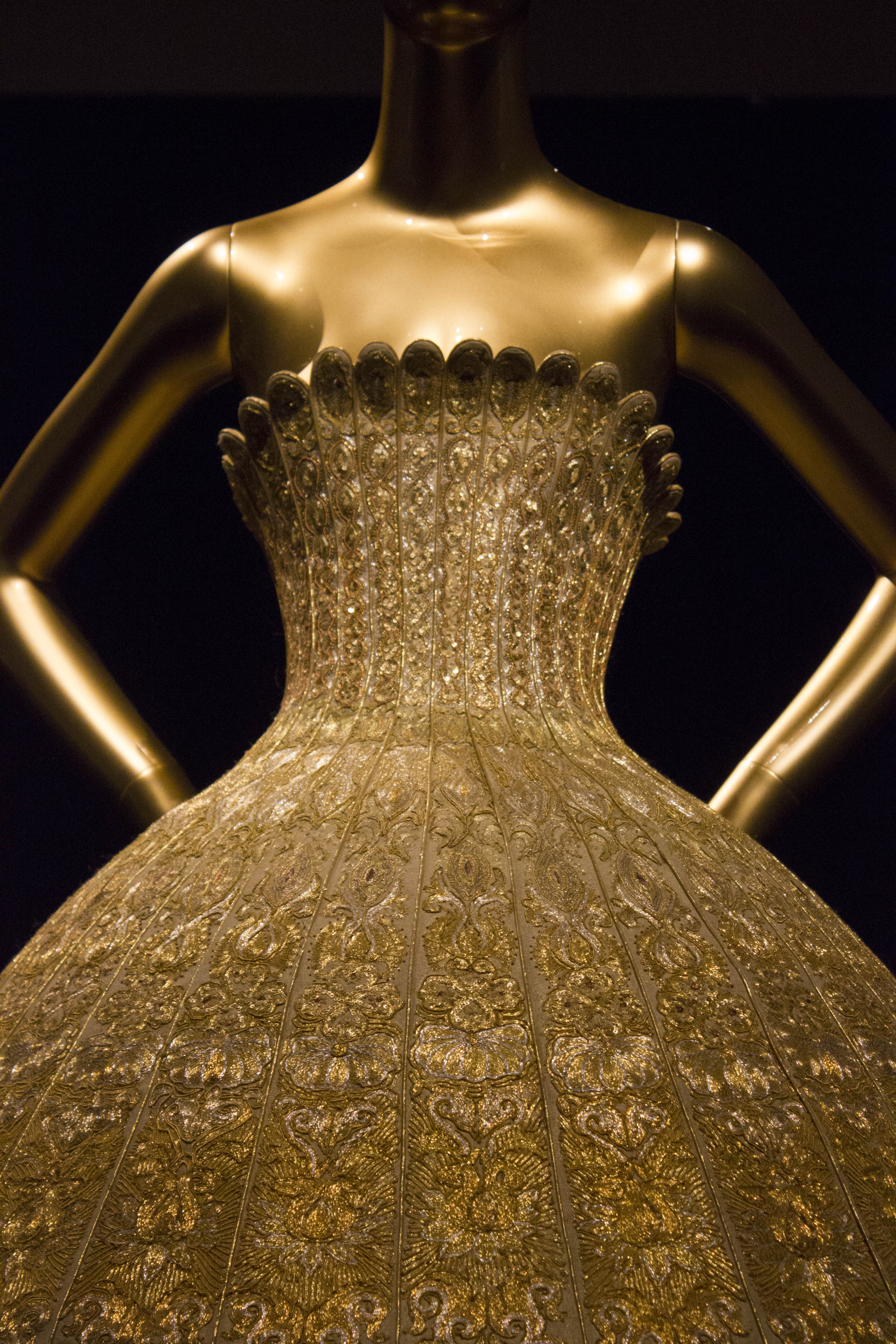
Detail on Guo Pei's silk dress

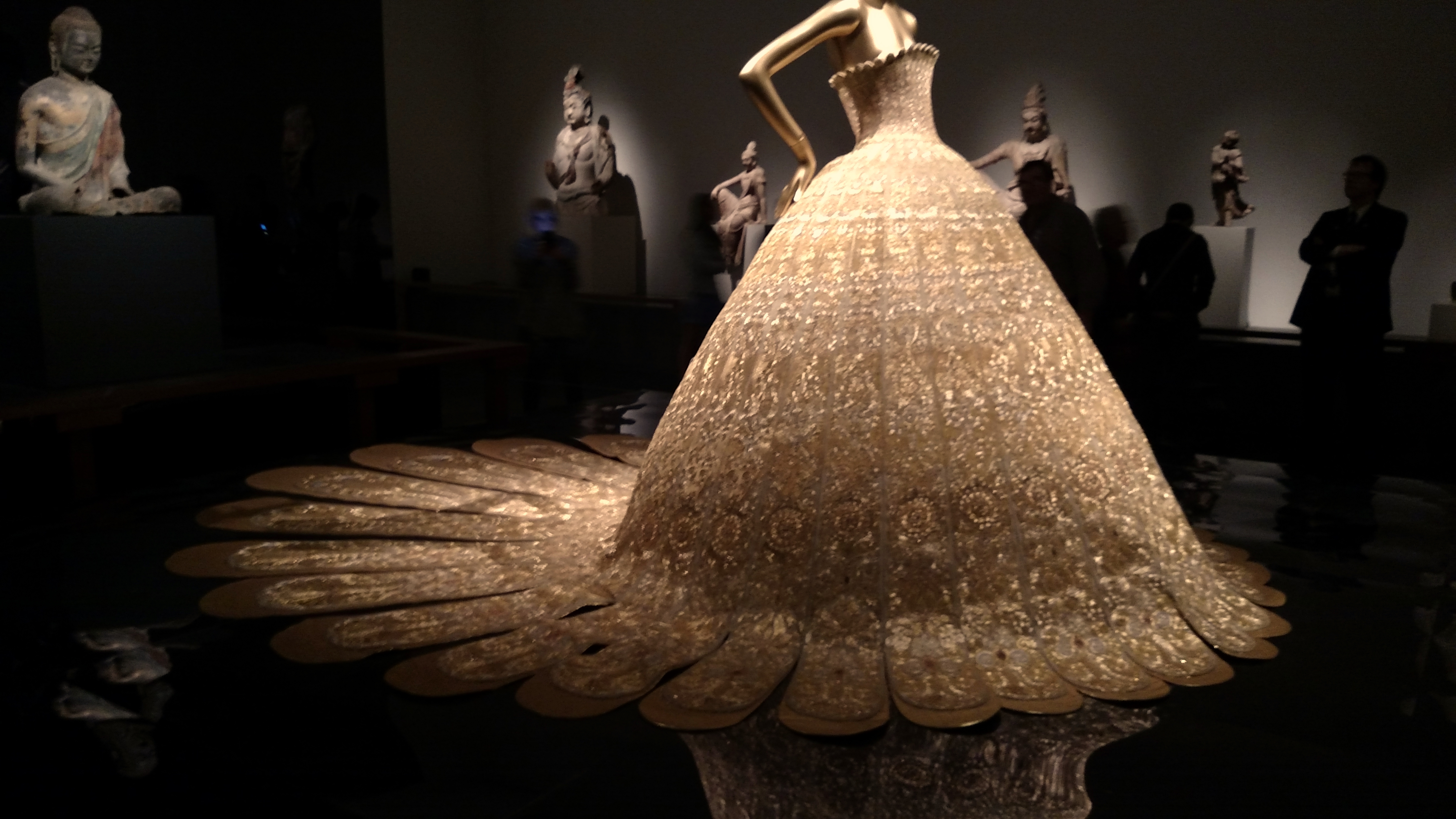
A silk couture dress by Chinese designer Guo Pei became a center piece of the exhibition
