= Manus x Machina: Fashion in an Age of Technology =

Exhibition at the Metropolitan Museum of Art

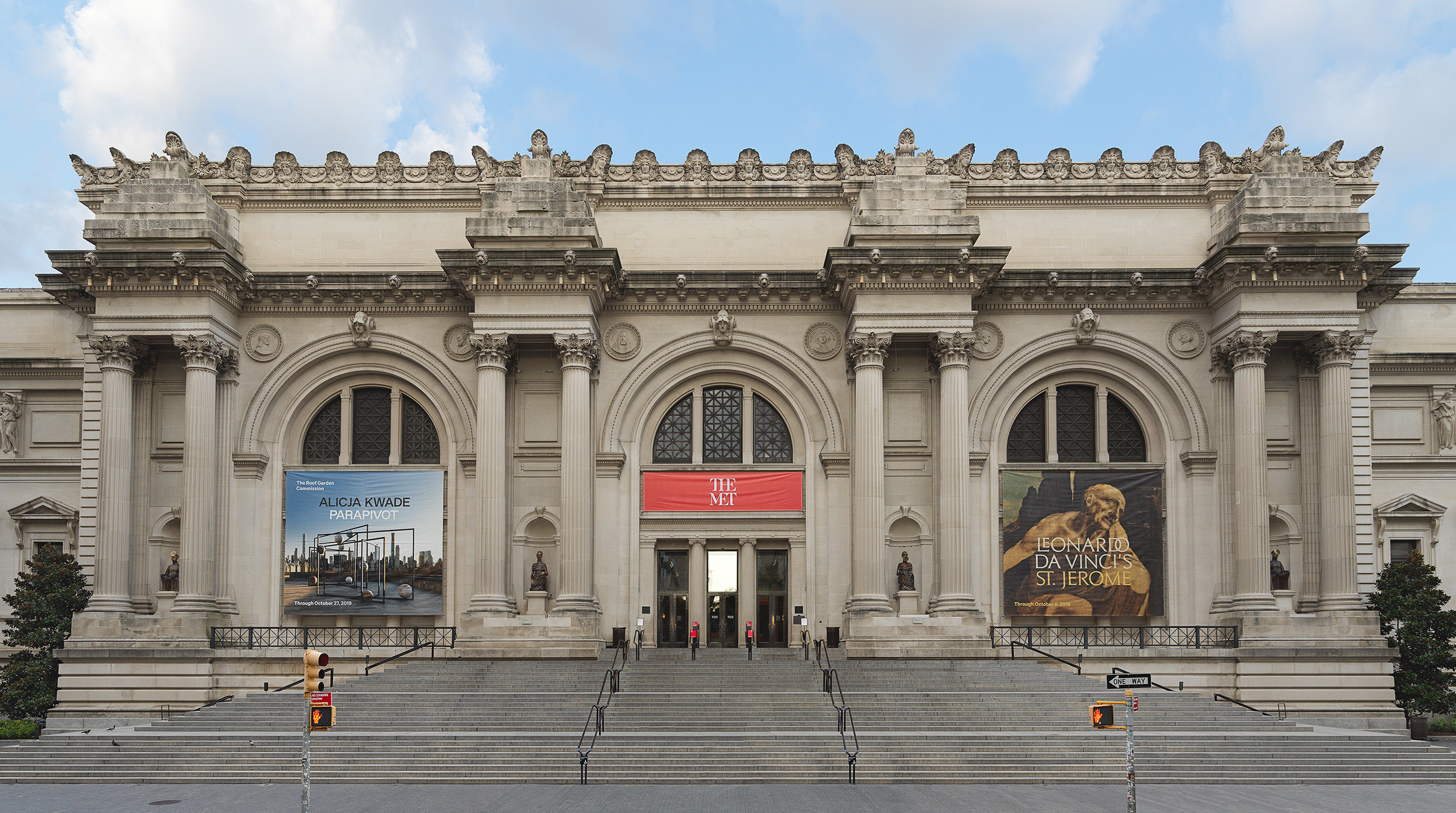
The Metropolitan Museum of Art (The Met) entrance façade in Upper East Side, Manhattan, New York City

Manus x Machina: Fashion in an Age of Technology was an exhibition at the Metropolitan Museum of Art that showcased the dichotomy between Manus (the hand), also known as haute couture, and Machina (the machine), also known as prêt-à-porter. The Metropolitan Museum of Art debuted this exhibition during the 2016 Met Gala and ran it from May 5, 2016 to September 5, 2016. It included over 120 pieces from designers like Chanel and Christian Dior, varying from the 20th Century to present day .

The exhibition explored the evolution of clothing and the differences in how pieces are made. Haute Couture is one piece, fitted to a specific individual, while prêt-à-porter pieces are mass marketed and sold to fit many individuals. In contrast to fashion created solely for a specific individual, pret a porter can be more associated with mass production such as fast fashion. Greatly focusing on making hand-made and machine-made equal and using both to solve design complications. Certain aspects of the exhibition direct the viewers attention to the clothing's DNA by laying out various case studies. The DNA reveals if the article was produced by hand or by machine.

At the same time, the show was meant to question the stigma hand-machine dichotomy has had in culture and symbolic meaning. "Typically, the hand has been identified with exclusivity and individuality as well as with elitism and the cult of personality. Similarly, the machine has been understood to signify not only progress and democracy but also dehumanization and homogenization." Said by the Met Museum themselves.

The incorporation of machines with modern fashion continues to breed new designs and will continuously influence the modern motif of what fashion will and can be.

A dramatic cathedral-like structure, designed by OMA and carefully constructed from white translucent scrims stretched over an intentionally visible framework, featured central domed atrium leading to five porte-cochères. While showcasing exquisite craftsmanship, this exhibit also explored technology's relationship with the handmade.

The exhibition featured pieces by renowned designers such as Maria Grazia Chiuri, Pier Paolo Piccioli, Nicolas Ghesquiere, Iris Van Herpen, Christopher Kane, Karl Lagerfeld, and Miuccia Prada.

The exhibition of Manus x Machina is a prime example of how fashion design is more than just clothing, it is an art. New York Times "Is it Streetwear or Is it Art" is an article going into detail about Mr. Thomas's "Gallery Dept" store. It talks about streetwear and his part in the fashion world, highlighting that fashion designs are more than just clothes and dresses but actual art.

== Exhibition Galleries ==
Manus x Machina's intention was to have the handmade and the machine-made serve as expressions of the designer's creative impulses, to liberate them from their usual haute couture and prêt-à-porter confines. The galleries that made up the exhibit incorporated the use of traditional handcrafted methods and modern machine methods to create homogenous pieces that highlighted the designers' creativities.

=== Wearable Technology ===
“Manus x Machina” has embraced the implementation of wearable technology into high-end fashion. This enabled new boundaries for what could be considered wearable technology and even brought on the support of Apple as sponsors for the event. Designers at the event showed off new measures of technology that included 4-D printing, nanoengineering, metamaterials, biotechnology, and using nano drones to make a dress.

=== Case Study, Chanel Wedding Ensemble ===
Karl Lagerfield's Wedding Ensemble for Chanel is a hand molded, machine sewn, and hand finished garment made from scuba knit, a polyester based fabric, and silk satin. This ensemble has been described by Lagerfeld as "haute couture without the couture," being the focal point of the Manus x Machina exhibition.

There was embroidery, painting, sewing, and heat presses to make and design the dress using both machines and hand.

=== Case Study, Iris van Herpen ‘Bird’ ===
Dutch designer Iris van Herpen worked with Cedric Laquieze to create a dress using silicone feathers, cotton twill, gull skulls and synthetic pearls. The dress included hand stitch, laser cut, machine stitch, hand applied feathers, and a silicone coating. The two birds at the shoulders of the dress are made with real skulls, decorated with synthetic pears and glass eyes. The mixed media of this garment, essential for the design, presents a challenge to conservators tasked with keeping the garment in good condition.

=== Broderie ===
Broderie is also known as embroidery. This includes feather work and artificial flowers. The techniques of creating these have remained unchanged for more than a century.

Traditional embroidery is needlework deriving from three types of stitches: flat, looped, and knotted. In the 1860s Louis Ferry-Bonnechaux invented Luneville embroidery: the practice of wooden frames used to stretch out and hook the fabric to decorate the textile with chain stitch.

The greatest innovations in hand embroidery developed due to new materials allowing for a diverse range of surface embellishments.

Although Paris is the center of specialized embroiderers, India is becoming an important role in hand embroidery with skilled craftspeople.

=== Plumasserie ===
Plumasserie is long for the Latin term "plumarius": used to describe both feather work and embroiderer. Today, both are combined into one practice to make clothing pieces.

Feathers have a long process before they can be part of any design. First the feathers are cleaned, dried, and sorted, then they are bleached, and sometimes dyed. The feathers are then shaped, trimmed, scorched, and finished through reduction. Through handwork, the feathers are knotted or wrapped to a wire and finally each feather is pulled across a metal tool.

=== Parurier Floral ===
Parurier Floral are artificial flowers and are a significant form of embellishment in the haute couture.

Artificial flowers also have a long process before implemented into clothing. To begin, the material is treated in a flour or gelatin. The petals are then cut and layered to be created all together lastly, the petals are stamped, using machines rather than mallets.

To decorate, the petals are dyed with a hand mixed alcohol and pigment solution, being dipped and dried several times until the color is attained. The petals are shaped and glued together to a piece of thread.

=== Toiles ===
Toiles is a French term for "cloth" or "canvas", being used since the 19th century to describe a prototype garment for a finished fashion design. Toiles are also referred to as "muslins": an unbleached plain-weave textile usually made of linen.

Toiles have been used to create mannequins. In the 1850s, Alexis Lavigne used paper-mâché padded with cotton and covered in seamed canvas to create one of the first dummies. These dummies are now used to help with measurements and dimensions essential to dressmaking.

For Manus a full toile is created and for machina half a toile is created.

=== Tailleur and Flou ===
Tailleur the French term for "one who cuts" is the action of cutting or hewing.

Cutting and hewing has become easier with the use of a sewing machine, but it is also an art form. Understanding how pieces of fabrics work together and how to manipulate the fabric is a technique.

Flou implying something being hazy or blurry specializing in draping.

A garment made within the flou is responds to the hand of the fabric and the layering around the figure.

=== Plissé 1 ===
Plissé also known as pleating was brought into the fashion world once the invention in the 1760s by Martin Petit with paper mold was created.

By the 19th century the technique was advanced. In the 20th century, designers advanced pleating techniques further with technological advancements.

Designer Mary McFadden created an invention called "Marii": using synthetic fabric woven in Australia, dyed in Japan, and pleated in the United States. These innovations were then continued by Issey Miyake, pleating clothing rather than textiles.

=== Plissé 2 ===
While most pleated garments appreciate classic drapery, others are fitted and shaped by hand without cutting or seaming the fabric.

Designers like Thiery Mugler and Junko Koshino combine handmade and machines to make their grid-like patterns, creating an illusion of volume with linear repetition. These designers use ratio and geometric relations to understand the dimensions needed for their pieces.

Issey Miyake's "132.5" collection was designed entirely by a computer program, but the hands of those who were wearing it were needed to transform the structured clothing.

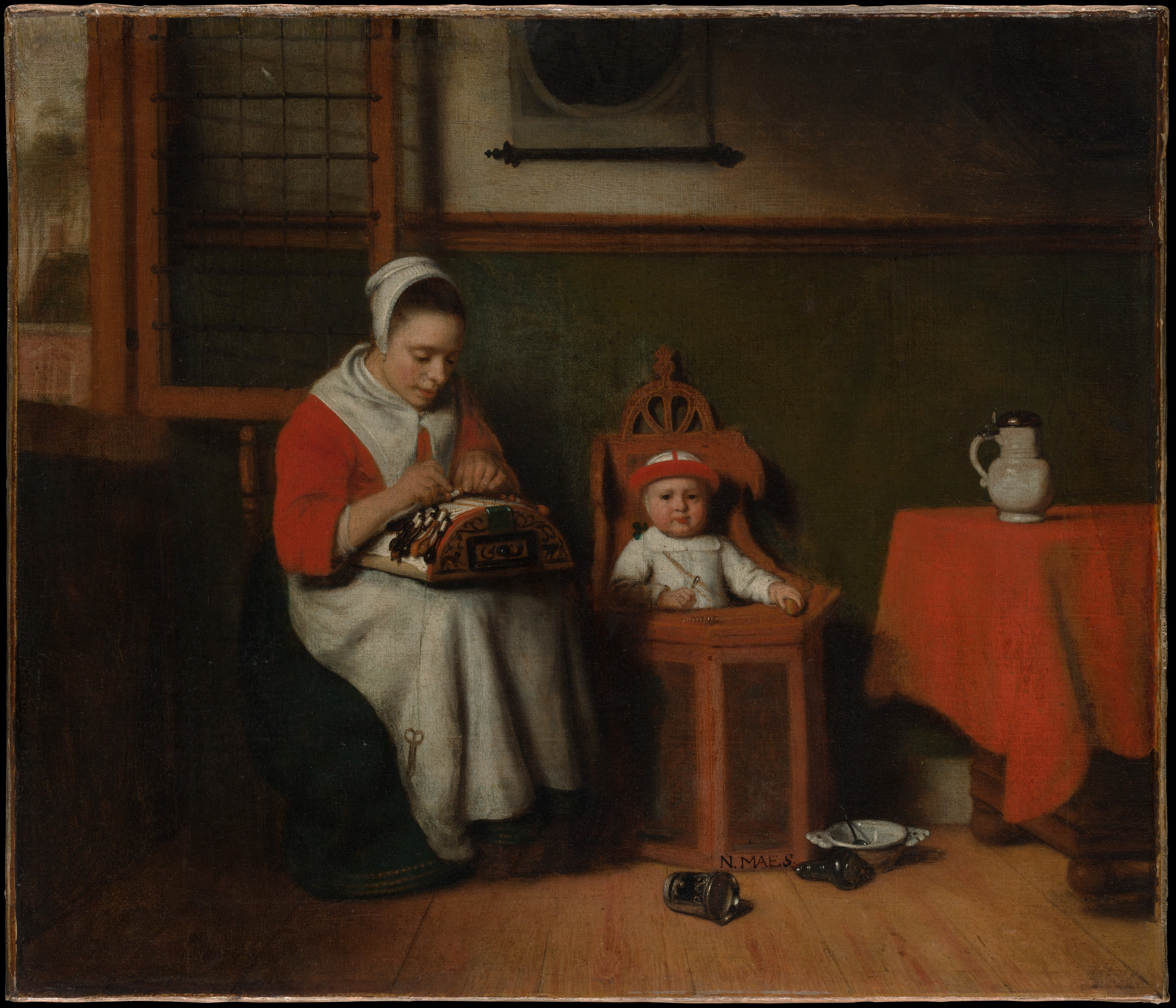
The Lacemaker – painting by Nicolaes Maes (MET, 32.100.5)

=== Dentellerie ===
Dentellerie is the French term for "lacemaking".

The introduction of lace was around the 16th century and rose to prominence by the 16th century. There are two types of handmade lace: bobbin (pillow lace) and needlepoint (point lace), which make use of additive techniques. The initial making of lace involved multiple stages of production: creating the netted ground, repairing, and finishing. This production took training, time, and labor that inventors were trying to replicate with machinery.

In 1809 John Heathcoast patented the Bobbinet machine, creating a netted ground for the lace that just needed completion with decorations. in 1813 the Bobbinet machine was improved by John Leavers, and eventually adapted a mechanism that produced lace completed with net and pattern.

During the industrial revolution, machines continued to be manufactured with greater speed and efficiency.

Today machine-made lace predominates in both the haute couture and prêt-à-porter

=== Maroquinerie ===
Maroquinerie is a French term derived from a type of goatskin exported from Morocco that specializes in fine leatherwork.

There is a delicate technique and process that evolved during the 19th century. Many designers used chromium salts, increased dexterity, and created leather pieces with real animals, this then introduced the reptilian simulations. Designers would stamp the skins of animals into the leather, this leading to the first synthetic leather to enter high fashion.

In the late 20th century, there was an increase in experimenting with leather. Later using recent technology to cut, weld, and create synthetic pieces that novelties of the 1920s and 1960s have been equaled.
