= Threeasfour =

American fashion house

threeASFOUR
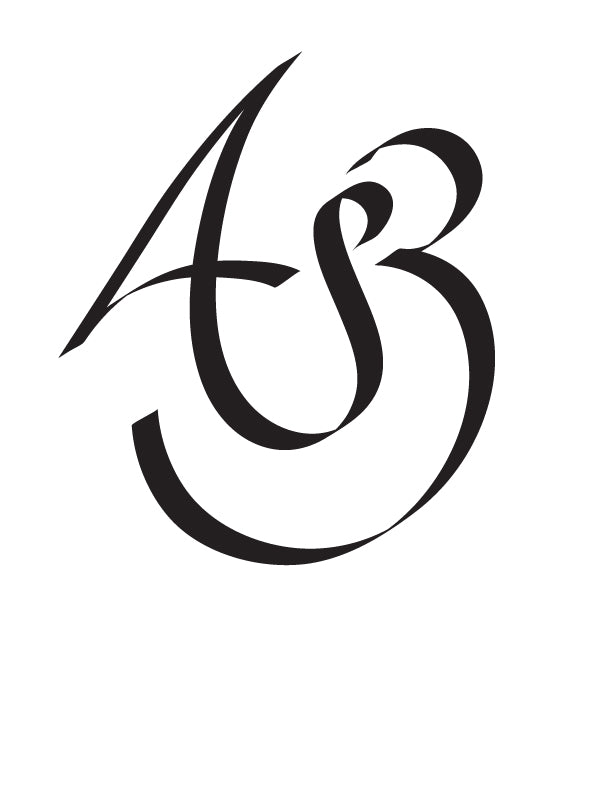

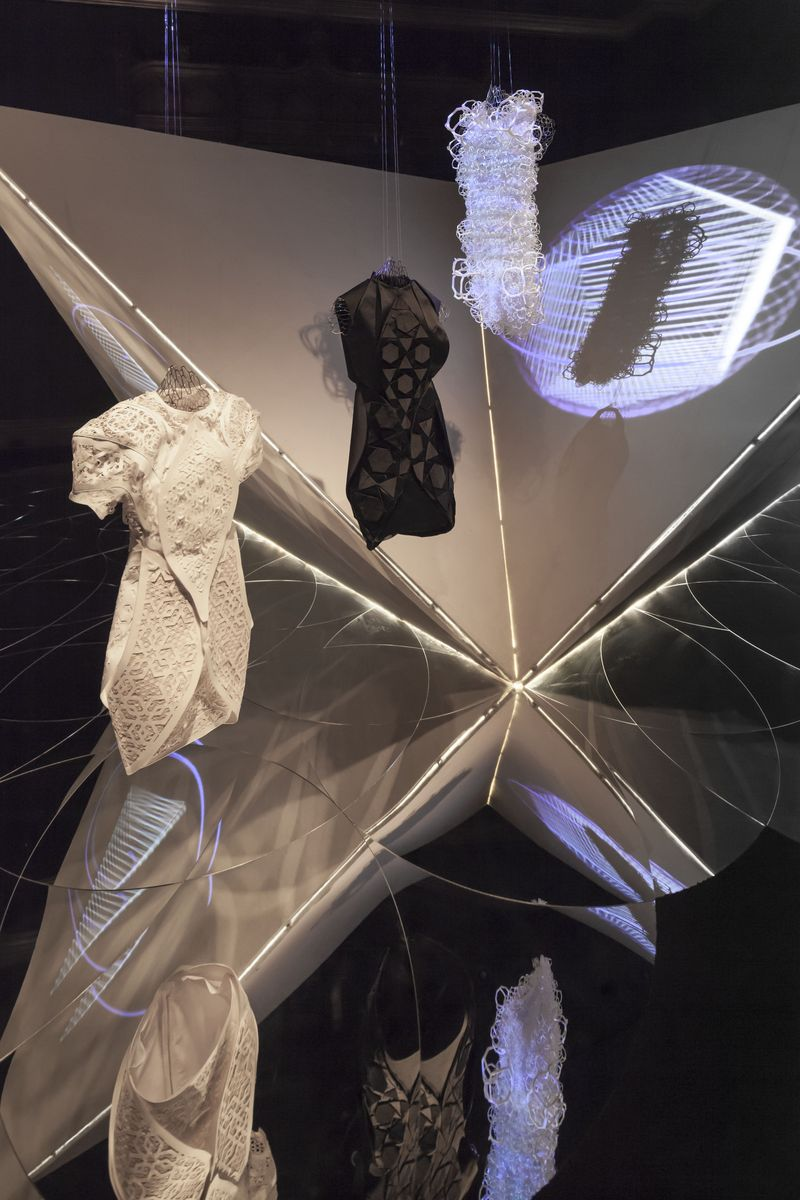
- Type: Privately held
- Industry: Fashion
- Founded: 2005 New York City, New York
- Headquarters: Jersey City, New Jersey, USA
- Key people: Gabriel Asfour; Angela Donhauser; Adi Gil
- Products: Apparel, Accessories
- Website: threeASFOUR

threeASFOUR is a New York fashion house led by Gabriel Asfour, Angela Donhauser, and Adi Gil, known for combining technical innovation and couture craftsmanship with an aesthetic focus on natural geometries. Hailing from Lebanon, USSR, and Israel, respectively, Asfour, Donhauser, and Gil have referred to threeASFOUR as a ‘United Nations of Fashion’, and their collections frequently promote intercultural unity. The house presents their designs at New York Fashion Week, and their work is exhibited by several museums internationally, including the Metropolitan Museum’s Costume Institute and London’s Victoria and Albert Museum. In 2015, threeASFOUR was awarded the Cooper Hewitt National Design Award for fashion design.

== History ==
threeASFOUR was founded in 2005 after the adjournment of ASFOUR, a design collective established in 1998 by Asfour, Donhauser, Gil, and Kai Khune, who left the group to pursue his own label. ASFOUR were known for their ‘Circle Bags’, considered synonymous with the downtown New York fashion scene during the early 2000s. The collective operated out of the so-called ‘Silver Cage’, a studio located on Forsyth Street in Chinatown, Manhattan. Artist Lauren Boyle described the studio as ‘the epicenter of the sort of [...] mythical, barely documented period of downtown New York. [...] [A] kind of utopian bubble of grungy, pre-internet, pre-smartphone glamor set against the Florida recount, and the chaos of 9/11, and Giuliani’s dancing ban’. In 2004, ASFOUR released a capsule collection with Kate Spade, and in 2007 they were finalists for the CFDA/Vogue Fashion Fund, which resulted in a capsule collection with Gap. Later that year, they collaborated with artist Matthew Barney on ‘The Guardian of the Veil’, a performance piece exhibited at the Manchester Opera House.

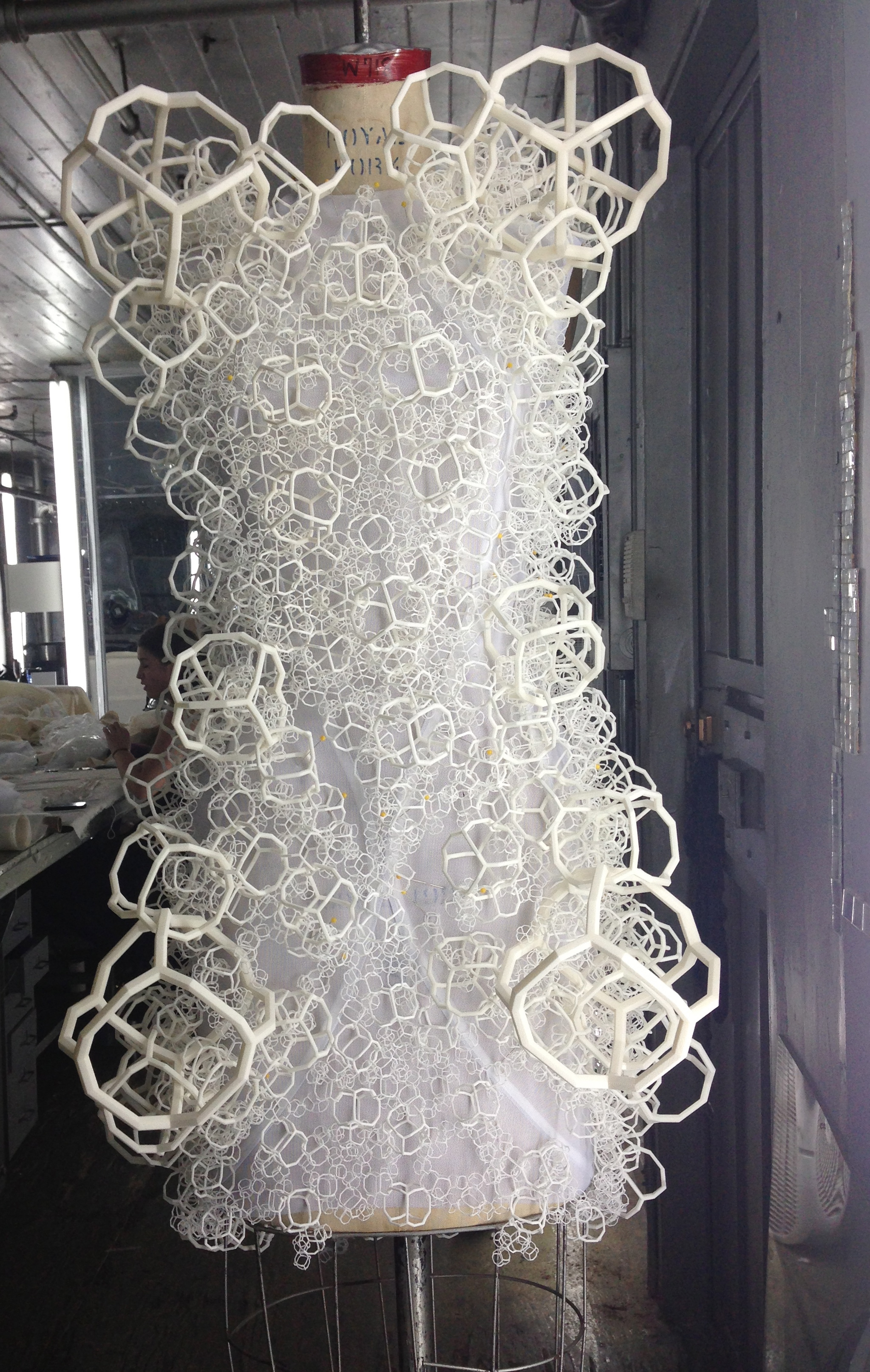
'Bahai Dress', by threeASFOUR, SS14, in collaboration with Bradley Rothernberg and Materialise.

As threeASFOUR, Asfour, Donhauser, and Gil were, according to artist Shoplifter, ‘able to focus a little bit more on the design, on being a company’. Photographer Schohaja told Vogue that ‘Threeasfour are perhaps less poetic [than ASFOUR] but developed even more their message of peace in between nations/religions, using new techniques (3D Printing) for their collections and new media to present their work’. This combination of technological development and promotion of international co-existence is considered characteristic of the house, whose Spring 2012 ready-to-wear collection, ‘InSALAAM InSHALLOM’, drew upon the heritage of its founders to envision a dialogue between Jewish and Arabic iconography. Taking inspiration from keffiyeh patterns, the evil eye, the hamsa, six-pointed stars, and tallit shawls in order to invoke what journalist Matthew Schneier called ‘the essential similarity of even warring parties’. This message – the ‘geometric unification of cultural symbology’ – continued for Spring 2014. This collection, entitled ‘Mer Ka Ba’, took aesthetic inspiration from the tiling patterns on churches, synagogues, and mosques, combining Christian, Jewish, and Islamic geometries into unified patterns. ‘Mer Ka Ba’ is notable for premiering threeASFOUR's first two 3D printed dresses, created in collaboration with 3D printing company Materialise and architect Bradley Rothenberg. The use of this technology to create both the fabric and the silhouette of a garment would go on to become a signature code of the house. ‘Mer Ka Ba’ was exhibited as a solo installation at the Jewish Museum in New York, which opened with a runway show featuring a 7 ft temple designed in collaboration with architect Christian Wassmann. Whilst showing at the museum, threeASFOUR launched ‘Fest’ during the performance art festival Performa, in which audience members would break bread (provided by Breads Bakery) from custom 'bread dresses' in a combination of avant-garde fashion and ancient ritual.

== Collaborations ==
In recent years, threeASFOUR have collaborated with tech companies in order to experiment with cutting-edge design practices. ‘Biomimicry’ for Fall/Winter 2016, which sought design solutions from the natural world, featured two entirely 3D-printed dresses, produced in collaboration with the 3D printing company Stratasys and 3D designer Travis Fitch. Gil described how these garments were ‘intended to maximize the potentials inherent to this technology. [...] [I]t was critical to us that the design should evoke a language unique to 3D Printing’. The Pre-Fall 2018 collection was a partnership with Epson, using digital sublimation printing techniques to produce patterns inspired by the cymascopic photography of collaborator Linden Gledhill. Spring 2020's collection, ‘Human Plant’, was once again based on the confluences between natural geometries and human anatomy, focusing on botanical structures. ‘Human Plant’ also featured the ‘Chro Morpho’ collection, again working alongside Fitch and Stratasys, debuting dresses created by 3D printing directly on to pre-existing textiles, as opposed to using the technology to produce the garment itself, as was done with prior examples of 3D printed garments.

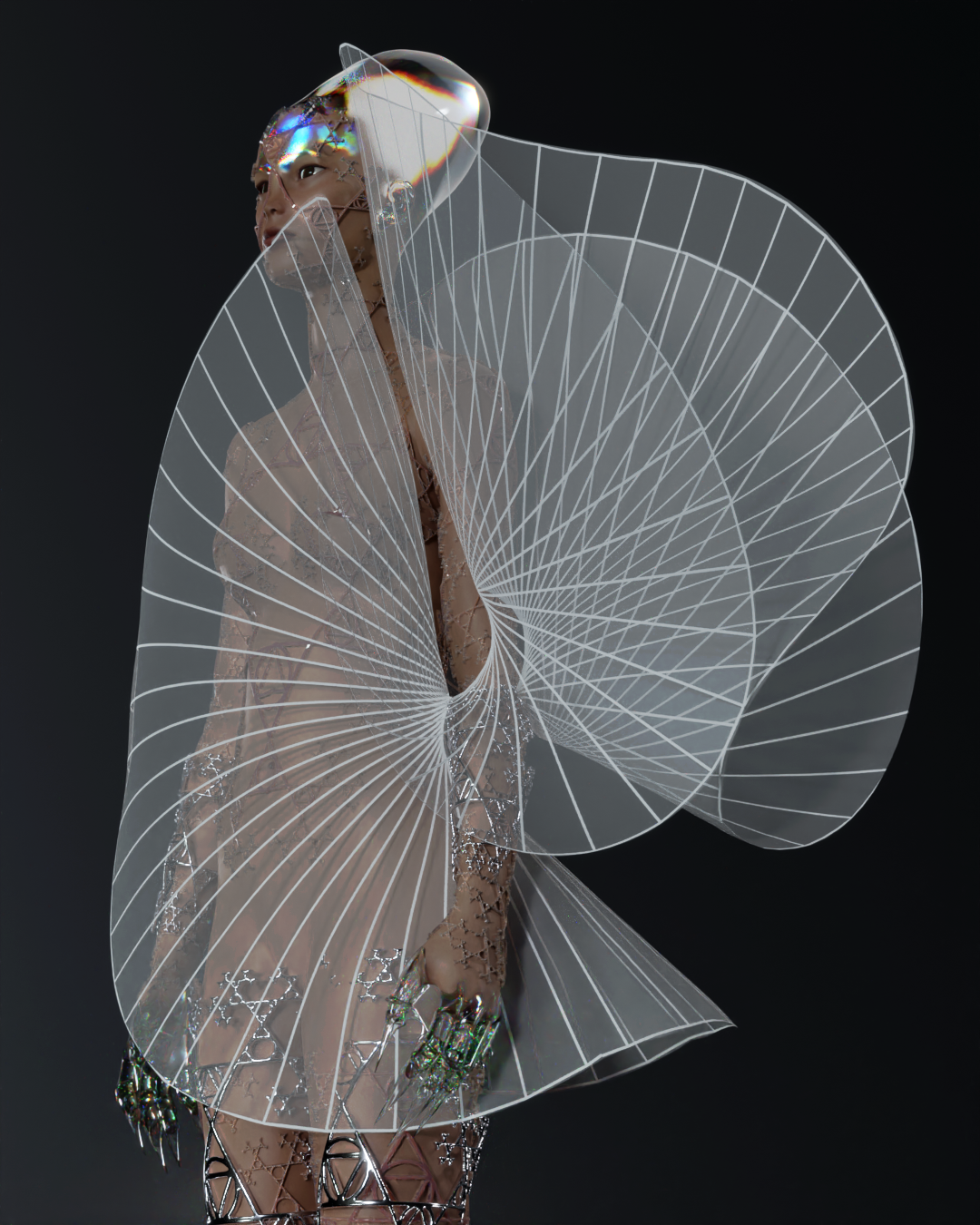
'Shinto', by threeASFOUR, FW23 Couture, in collaboration with Shingo Everard

‘Vesica Picsis’, the Spring 2022 collection – produced alongside digital printing company Mimaki – was shown via a film produced using XR technology. A collaboration with digital artist Alex Czetwertynski and Worldstage Inc, the film used an LED stage backdrop and in-camera augmented reality to create a virtual environment of 3D fractals in which to display the clothes. SS22 ('Kundalini') was produced in collaboration with digital printing company Kornit Digital, and was described by Vogue as 'light years ahead of most of the industry'. For FW22 Couture, a collection entitled ‘Ancestors’, threeASFOUR presented an entirely digital collection, building upon the digital environments used in ‘Vesica Picsis’ and earlier collections ‘Topographic’ (FW14) and ‘Tree of Life’ (SS15). The garments were digital replicas of looks from ‘Vesica Picsis’, made available as NFTs in collaboration with DressX. Each NFT has the potential to be 3D printed proportionally, combining digital fashion with physical garments.

In addition to collaborations within the tech industries, threeASFOUR frequently collaborates with artists, performers, and musicians, and have been described by the New York Post as ‘known for dressing famed risk takers like Lady Gaga and Björk in futuristic showstoppers’. Indeed, singer Björk considers herself their number one fan, having collaborated with the house since 2000, including on her ‘Biophilia’ and ‘Utopia’ tours. A threeASFOUR dress worn by Lady Gaga for a Harper’s Bazaar photoshoot was auctioned for $15,625 in 2014. The house collaborated with performance artist Yoko Ono for their Spring 2010 collection, a reinterpretation of Ono's ‘Cut Piece’, featuring a model's spiraling dress being cut away, altering into a white bandeau top and briefs. The show was soundtracked by the Plastic Ono Band and displayed garments inspired by Ono's dot drawings. ‘There's not one fashion designer like them’, Ono told Vogue, ‘art comes first’. The garments shown for Fall 2019 were constructed from recycled canvases donated by the artist Stanley Casselman. Pre-Fall 2019 featured repurposed denim, including Cassleman's paint-splattered jeans and vintage Levi’s. threeASFOUR have notably dressed Mariah Carey for the cover of her 2005 album The Emancipation of Mimi; Rihanna during her Loud tour in 2011; and Solange for a 2017 Bust cover. Other collaborators include Billy Porter at the 2021 Brit awards, Caroline Polacheck, Japanese Breakfast, Mitski, and Joey King.

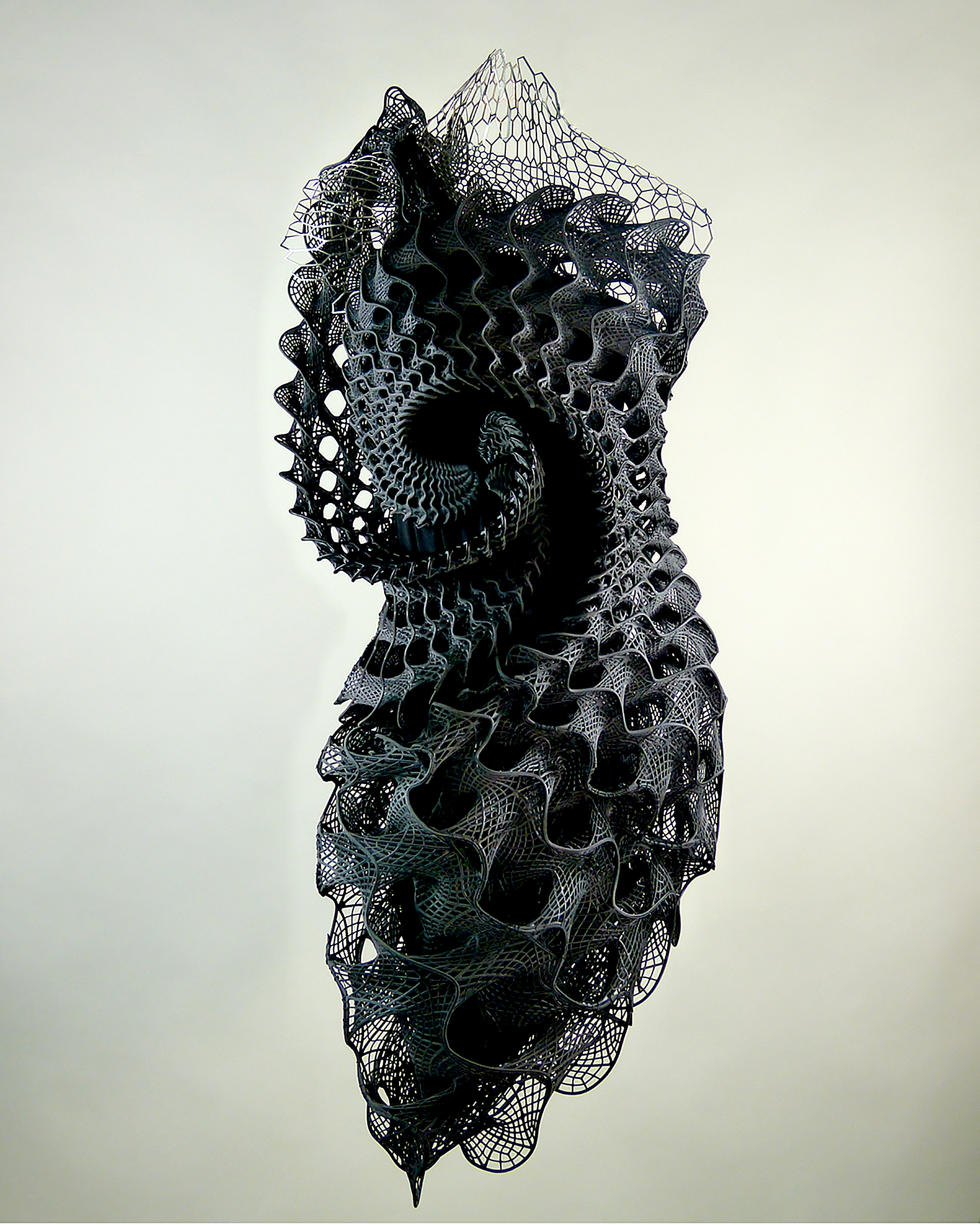
'Harmonograph Dress', by threeASFOUR, FW16, in collaboration with 3D designer Travis Fitch and Stratasys.

== Notable exhibitions ==
threeASFOUR's designs are permanently housed in the Cooper Hewitt Design Museum, the Museum at FIT, London's V&A Museum and the MET Costume Institute in New York, which also displayed threeASFOUR's work for 'Superheroes' in 2008, 'Manus X Machina' in 2016, and most recently 2022's 'In America: An Anthology of Fashion' Their pieces have been the subject of various exhibitions, including 'Designs for Different Futures', Philadelphia Museum of Art & Walker Art Center (2019); 'Nature', Cooper-Hewitt Design Museum (2019); '#techstyle', Museum of Fine Arts, Boston (2016); 'Killer Heels', Brooklyn Museum (2014); 'MER KA BA', Jewish Museum, New York (2013); 'Insalaam Inshalom', Beit Ha’ir Cultural Museum, Tel Aviv (2013); and 'New York Minute', Garage Gallery, Moscow (2011).
