= In America: A Lexicon of Fashion =

2021–2022 high fashion art exhibition

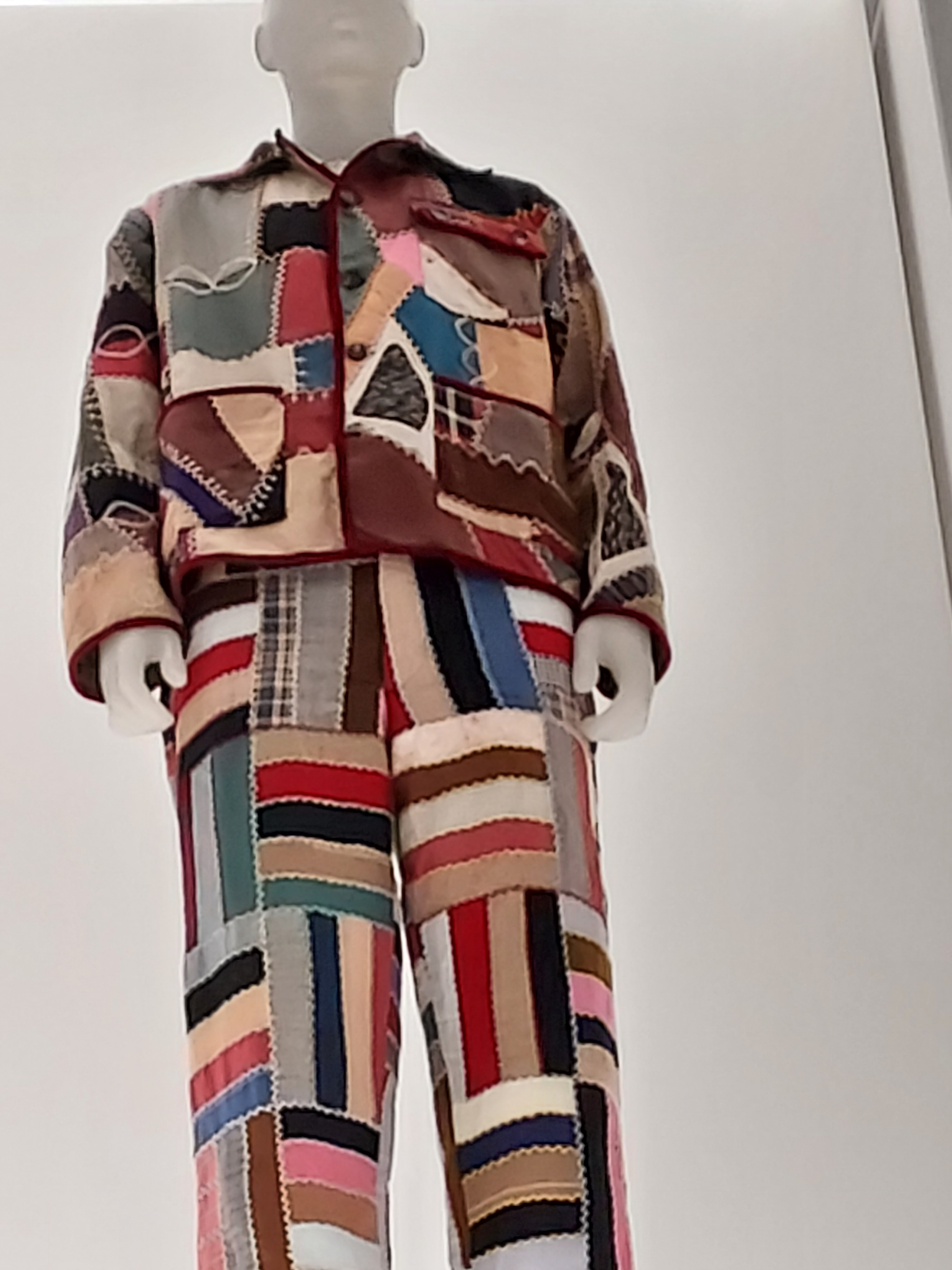
A Bode outfit displayed at the exhibition.

In America: A Lexicon of Fashion was a 2021–2022 high fashion art exhibition of the Anna Wintour Costume Center, a wing of the Metropolitan Museum of Art (MMA), which houses the collection of the Costume Institute. Approximately 100 men’s and women’s ensembles by a diverse range of designers from the 1940s to the present are featured. Along with ensembles, various dresses, sweaters, jackets, jumpsuits, bodysuits, coats, smocks, capes, quilts, and a flag were showcased as part of the exhibit. Enclosed in scrimmed cases that represent three-dimensional "patches" of a quilt, they are organized into 12 sections that explore defining emotional qualities: Nostalgia, Belonging, Delight, Joy, Wonder, Affinity, Confidence, Strength, Desire, Assurance, Comfort, and Consciousness.

It is the first portion of a two-part exhibition on fashion in the United States. Part two, In America: An Anthology of Fashion—which opened in the American Wing period rooms on May 7, 2022—presented sartorial narratives that relate to the complex and layered histories of those rooms.
