= Death Becomes Her (disambiguation) =

Death Becomes Her is a 1992 American black comedy film directed and produced by Robert Zemeckis.

Death Becomes Her may also refer to:

== Entertainment ==
- Death Becomes Her (musical), a 2024 musical performance based on the film
- "Death Becomes Her", a 2004 episode from the first season of the American television series Tru Calling
- "Death Becomes Her", a 2024 episode from the third season of American television series Chucky

== Art ==
- Death Becomes Her: A Century of Mourning Attire, an exhibition at the Metropolitan Museum of Art (2014–2015)

== See also ==
- "Death Becomes Him", a 1993 episode from the first season of American television series Frasier
- "Death Becomes Them", a 2005 episode from the seventh season of American television series Charmed
- "Debt Becomes Her", a 2011 episode from the fourth season of American reality television series The Real Housewives of New York City
