= Anna Wintour Costume Center =

Wing of the Metropolitan Museum of Art, housing The Costume Institute

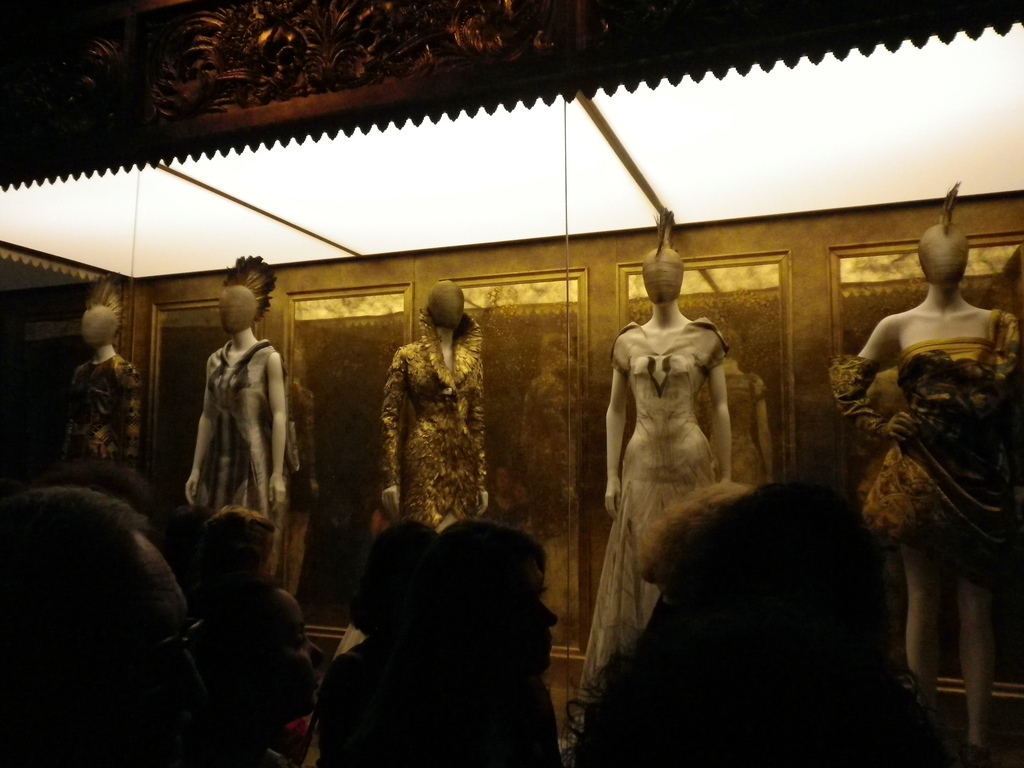
- Savage Beauty Exhibition, 2011

- Location within New York City
- Established: 2014
- Location: 1000 5th Avenue, Manhattan, New York City; 10028
- Coordinates: 40°46′48″N 73°57′44″W
- Director: Andrew Bolton
- Public transit access: Subway: to 86th Street; Bus: M1, M2, M3, M4, M79, M86

The Anna Wintour Costume Center is a wing of the Metropolitan Museum of Art main building in New York City, United States. It houses the collection of the Costume Institute, a curatorial department of the museum focused on fashion and costume design. The center is named after Anna Wintour, the longtime editor-in-chief of Vogue, Chief Content Officer of Condé Nast, and chair of the museum's annual Met Gala (often called the "Met Ball") since 1995. It was endowed by Lizzie and Jonathan Tisch. As of August 2017, the chief curator is Andrew Bolton.

The center was formally opened by the first lady of the United States Michelle Obama on May 5, 2014. Guests included Sarah Jessica Parker, Diane Von Furstenberg, Tory Burch, Zac Posen, Ralph Lauren, and Donatella Versace.

== History ==
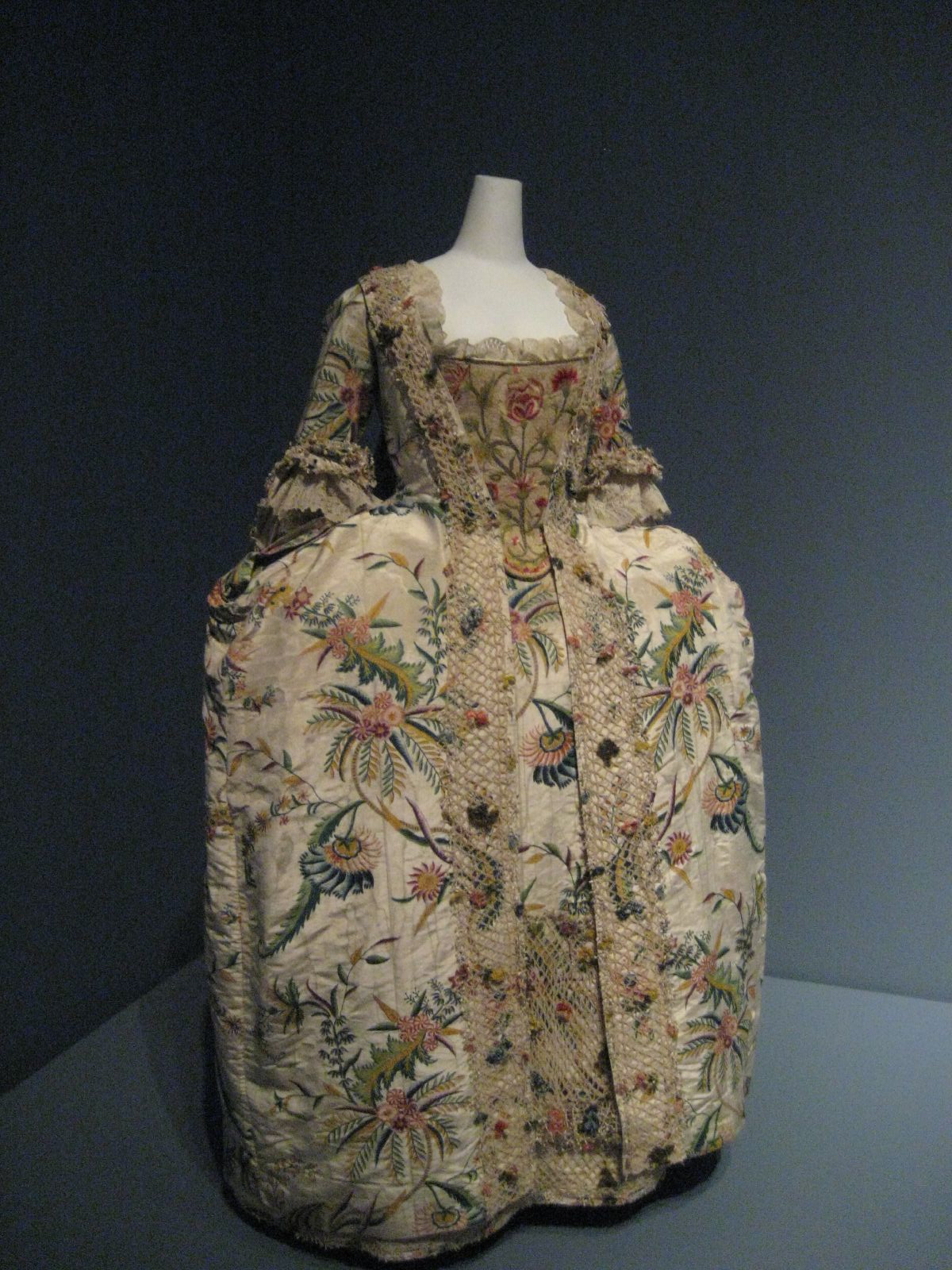
Robe à la française 1740s, as seen in one of the exhibits at the Costume Institute

In 1902, wealthy philanthropists Irene and Alice Lewisohn began to volunteer at the Henry Street Settlement House in New York, a community center that provided social services and healthcare to immigrant families. Alice, who acted in plays herself, began working as a drama teacher, while Irene devoted herself to dance productions. In 1914, the sisters bought a lot on the corner of Grand and Pitt Streets and donated it to the Settlement for building a new theater. The Neighborhood Playhouse opened in 1915. By 1920, the theater employed professional actors, and it was known for its experimental productions and its revue "The Grand Street Follies." Theater designer Aline Bernstein served her apprenticeship there from 1915 to 1924 designing costumes and stage sets.

The Playhouse closed in 1927, but the company continued to produce plays on Broadway under the management of Helen F. Ingersoll. In 1928, with Rita Wallach Morganthau, the Lewisohns established the Neighborhood Playhouse School of the Theatre at East 54th Street, where it became an actor training school and students were offered a two-year program formal drama and dance training to become professionals.

During their years of running the school theatre and producing plays, a body of knowledge was formed about acting, theater production, and costume, set and stage design. In 1937, Irene Lewisohn opened a home for this library, the Museum of Costume Art, on Fifth Avenue. Aline Bernstein served as the first President and Polaire Weissman as its first executive director. After Irene Lewisohn's death in 1944, Lord & Taylor president Dorothy Shaver worked to bring the collection to the Metropolitan Museum of Art. Shaver believed that this would strengthen the American fashion industry and raised $350,000 from New York garment manufacturers to finance the transaction. The Costume Art museum became part of the Metropolitan Museum of Art in 1946, becoming The Costume Institute, which was independently run until 1959 when it became a curatorial department in the museum. After a renovation of the Costume Institute in 1960, the reference library associated with this collection was designated the Irene Lewisohn Costume Reference Library.

Since 1946, with help from the fashion publicist Eleanor Lambert, the institute has hosted the annual Met Gala to raise money for operating expenses.

After being fired from Vogue, fashion editor Diana Vreeland became a special consultant to the Costume Institute from 1972 until her death in 1989. In 1989, art history professor Richard Martin became the Curator in Charge of the collection, with the support of Associate Curator Harold Koda. After Martin's death in 1999, Koda returned to the Metropolitan museum in 2000 after co-curating an exhibition on Giorgio Armani for the Solomon R. Guggenheim Museum.

In 2009, the American Costume Collection of the Brooklyn Museum was transferred to the Costume Institute, as The Brooklyn Museum Costume Collection at The Metropolitan Museum of Art. The high costs of maintaining and displaying the collection was the main impetus for the move, which followed years of close collaboration between the two organizations. The collection of the Brooklyn museum is older, having been formed from private donations by former New York high society personalities, beginning with the donation in 1903 of an 1892 cream colored crepe dress worn by Kate Mallory Williams at her graduation from Brooklyn Heights Seminary. Prior to the move, 23,500 objects from the Brooklyn collection were digitized and these images are now shared by both organizations. At the time of the acquisition, the Met costume collection consisted of 31,000 objects from the 17th-century onwards.

At the time that the Brooklyn Museum Costume Collection was transferred to the Metropolitan Museum of Art, the Costume Institute space was closed for a significant multi-year renovation, the collection's first since 1992. Upon reopening in 2014, the combined Costume Institute was designated the Anna Wintour Costume Center to commemorate the long-time support of the Met Gala's fundraising campaign by Anna Wintour, who had been a Trustee of the museum since 1999. The Met Gala in 2014 marked the formal opening of the new space, with its first exhibition featuring work by British-born designer Charles James.

On September 8, 2015, it was announced that Harold Koda would be stepping down from his position as Curator in Charge of the Costume Institute. Andrew Bolton, who had joined the Costume Institute in 2002 as associate curator and was made curator in 2006, was announced as his replacement.

In May 2017, the Costume Institute featured an exhibition featuring the works of Rei Kawakubo/Comme des Garçons. The exhibit was the Costume Institute's first exhibition focusing on a living designer since Yves Saint Laurent in 1983.

In 2026, after a renovation of historic museum spaces, the museum debuted the Condé M. Nast Galleries, a dedicated 12,000-square-foot space for major Costume Institute exhibitions adjacent to the Great Hall. The first exhibition to be displayed in these new galleries was Costume Art.

The 2026 exhibition served as the first in the Costume Institute's history to be fully inclusive of all body types. The Costume Art exhibit highlighted all body types, including pregnant, plus-sized, and disabled figures.

== List of exhibitions ==
Year	Exhibition Title	Exhibition Dates	Notes	Citation
1971–1972	Fashion Plate	October 1971 – January 1972		
1972–1973	Untailored Garments	January–July 1972)		
1973–1974	The World of Balenciaga	March–September 1973		
1974–1975	Romantic and Glamorous Hollywood Design	November 1974 – August 1975		
1975–1976	American Women of Style	December 1975 – August 1976		
1976–1977	The Glory of Russian Costume	December 1976 – August 1977		
1977–1978	Vanity Fair: A Treasure Trove	December 1977 – September 1978		
1978–1979	Diaghilev: Costumes and Designs of the Ballets Russes	November 1978 – June 1979		
1979–1980	Fashions of the Habsburg Era: Austria-Hungary	December 1979 – August 1980		
1980–1981	The Manchu Dragon: Costumes of China, the Chi'ng Dynasty	December 1980 – August 1981		
1981–1982	The Eighteenth-Century Woman	December 1981 – September 1982		
1982–1983	Le Belle Époque	December 1982 – September 1983		
1983–1984	Yves Saint Laurent: 25 Years of Design	December 1983 – September 1984		
1984–1985	Man and the Horse	December 1984 – September 1985		
1985–1986	Costumes of Royal India	December 1985 – August 1986		
1986–1987	Dance	December 1986 – September 1987		
1987–1988	In Style: Celebrating Fifty Years of the Costume Institute	November 1987 – April 1988		
1988–1989	From Queen to Empress: Victorian Dress 1837–1877	December 1988 – April 1989		
1989–1990	The Age of Napoleon: Costume from Revolution to Empire, 1789–1815	December 1989 – April 1990		
1990–1991	Théâtre de la Mode – Fashion Dolls: The Survival of Haute Couture	December 1990 – April 1991		
1992–1993	Fashion and History: A Dialogue	December 1992 – March 1993		
1993–1994	Diana Vreeland: Immoderate Style	December 1993 – March 1994		
1994–1995	Orientalism: Visions of the East in Western Dress	December 1994 – March 1995		
1995–1996	Haute Couture	December 1995 – March 1996		
1996–1997	Christian Dior	December 1996 – March 1997		
1997–1998	Gianni Versace	December 1997 – March 1998		
1998–1999	Cubism and Fashion	December 10, 1998 – March 14, 1999		
1999–2000	Rock Style	December 9, 1999 – March 19, 2000		
2001	Jacqueline Kennedy: The White House Years	May 1 – July 29, 2001		
2001	Dress Rehearsal: Origins of the Costume Institute	August 1 – October 28, 2001		
2003	Goddess: The Classical Mode	May 1 – August 3, 2003		
2004	Dangerous Liaisons: Fashion and Furniture in the 18th Century	April 29 – August 8, 2004		
2005	The House of Chanel	May 5 – August 7, 2005		
2005–2006	Rara Avis: Selections from the Iris Barrel Apfel Collection	September 13, 2005 – January 22, 2006		
2006	AngloMania: Tradition and Transgression in British Fashion	May 3 – September 6, 2006		
2007	Poiret: King of Fashion	May 9 – August 5, 2007		
2007–2008	blog.mode: addressing fashion	December 18, 2007 – April 13, 2008	The last exhibition in the galleries of the Costume Institute prior to a multi-year closure for renovation.	
2008	Superheroes: Fashion and Fantasy	May 7 – September 1, 2008		
2009	The Model As Muse: Embodying Fashion	May 6 – August 9, 2009		
2010	American Woman: Fashioning a National Identity	May 5 – August 10, 2010		
2011	Alexander McQueen: Savage Beauty	May 4 – August 7, 2011		
2012	Schiaparelli and Prada: Impossible Conversations	May 10 – August 19, 2012		
2013	Punk: Chaos to Couture	May 9 – August 14, 2013		
2014	Charles James: Beyond Fashion	May 8 – August 10, 2014	First exhibition in the galleries of the renovated Anna Wintour Costume Center.	
2014–2015	Death Becomes Her: A Century of Mourning Attire	October 21, 2014 – February 1, 2015		
2015	China: Through the Looking Glass	May 7 – September 7, 2015		
2015–2016	Jacqueline de Ribes: The Art of Style	November 19, 2015 – February 21, 2016		
2016	Manus x Machina: Fashion in an Age of Technology	May 5 – September 5, 2016		
2016–2017	Masterworks: Unpacking Fashion	November 18, 2016 – February 5, 2017		
2017	Rei Kawakubo/Comme des Garçons Art of the In-Between	May 4 – September 4, 2017		
2018	Heavenly Bodies: Fashion and the Catholic Imagination	May 10 – October 8, 2018		
2019	Camp: Notes on Fashion	May 9 – September 8, 2019		
2019–2020	In Pursuit of Fashion: The Sandy Schreier Collection	November 27, 2019 – May 17, 2020	Marking the Met's 150th anniversary.	
2020	About Time: Fashion and Duration	October 29, 2020 – February 7, 2021		
2021–2022	In America: A Lexicon of Fashion	September 18, 2021 – September 5, 2022	Part one of a two part exhibition. In March 2022, nearly half of the pieces in this section were rotated out ahead of the opening of the second part of the exhibition.	
2022	In America: An Anthology of Fashion	May 7 – September 5, 2022	Part two of a two part exhibition. Part one remained on display during the course of the exhibition; the two parts closed concurrently.	
2023	Karl Lagerfeld: A Line of Beauty	May 5 – July 16, 2023		
2023–2024	Women Dressing Women	December 7, 2023 – March 10, 2024		
2024	Sleeping Beauties: Reawakening Fashion	May 10 – September 2, 2024		
2025	Superfine: Tailoring Black Style	May 10 – October 26, 2025		
2026–2027	Costume Art	May 10, 2026 – January 10, 2027		
2027–2028	extraORDINARY: Fashion and the Poetics of the Everyday	May 9, 2027 – January 9, 2028	Original plans for the exhibition John Galliano: Horizons were cancelled in August 2026	
