= Jean de Beaumont =

French sport shooter (1904–2002)

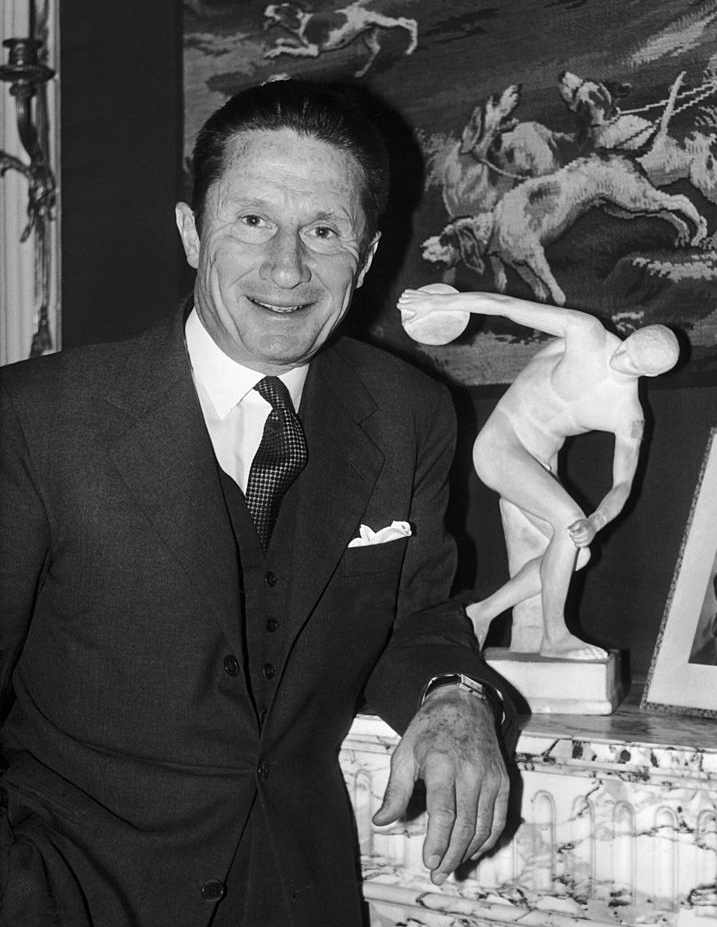
- Jean de Beaumont in 1967

Personal information
- Born: 13 January 1904 Château de Berg, Paris, France
- Died: 12 June 2002 (aged 98) Paris, France

Sport
- Sport: Sports shooting

Coat of arms of the family Bonnin de La Bonninière de Beaumont

Count Jean Bonnin de la Bonninière de Beaumont (13 January 1904 – 12 June 2002), simply known as Jean de Beaumont, was a French aristocrat, businessman, politician, journalist and sport shooter who competed at the 1924 Summer Olympics.

== Biography ==
De Beaumont was born in Paris into an old French aristocratic family, the son of Count Marc Louis Bonnin de la Bonninière de Beaumont (1869-1931) and his wife, Juliette Emélie De Trédern (1875-1963). His ancestors were Marc Antoine de Beaumont, Comte de Baumont, Senator of France and Guillaume Dupuytren, Baron Dupuytren, a French anatomist and military surgeon. He studied at the École des Roches and École Libre des Sciences Politiques.

De Beaumont was a versatile sportsman and sports official. In 1923, he reached the finals of the 110 metre hurdles at the World Student Games. At the 1924 Olympics, he finished 11th with the French team in the team clay pigeons competition. He served as president of the French Olympic Committee from 1967 to 1971, member of the International Olympic Committee from 1951 to 1971, and vice president of the IOC Executive Committee from 1970 to 1974.

De Beaumont started his business career as an assistant manager on rubber plantations in Indo-China. After returning to France he became president of several companies operating in the Far East and South Africa. Because of his business connections with Africa he was the first IOC Member to actively promote Olympic sports there. In France, de Beaumont served as a Member of Parliament in 1936–40, and fought as a pilot during World War II. On 10 July 1940, he voted in favour of granting the cabinet presided by Marshal Philippe Pétain authority to draw up a new constitution, thereby effectively ending the French Third Republic and establishing Vichy France.

== Family ==
On 15 May 1928, De Beaumont married Paule de Rivaud de La Raffinière (1908-1999), the only daughter of Olivier Macoux de Rivaud de la Raffinière (1875-1938) and his wife, Nicolle de Borrelli (1880-1939). Paule was great-great-granddaughter of Olivier Macoux de Rivaud, Baron de la Raffinière, a French infantry commander during the French Revolutionary and Napoleonic Wars. Together, they had two daughters and a son:

- Jacqueline Bonnin de la Bonninière de Beaumont, (1929-2025); a French designer, married Vicomte Édouard de Ribes (1923-2013), later Comte de Ribes
- Monique Bonnin de la Bonninière de Beaumont, (b. 1930)
- Louis-Marc Robert Bonnin de la Bonninière de Beaumont, (1934-2001); married Diane Anatonialdi

Preceded by (Austria) Bruno Kreisky	President of Organizing Committee for Winter Olympic Games; 1968	Succeeded by (Japan) Kogoro Uemura
