= Fashion and History: A Dialogue =

1992 exhibition at the Metropolitan Museum of Art

Fashion and History: A Dialogue was a 1992 exhibition of the Costume Institute at the Metropolitan Museum of Art (The Met). The exhibit featured European and American clothing and accessories from a variety of time periods. The curator was Katell Le Bourhis. The exhibition ran from December 7, 1992, to March 21, 1993 and had more than 200 pieces, many of them donated. Of that total, 120 mannequins were assembled entirely.

The event took place in the basement, a space of 5,000 square feet, and had four central themes: Floral Imagery, Symbolism of Black and White, Geometric and Abstract Imagery, and The Evolution of Tweeds.

== Background ==
Le Bourhis' aim for the exhibition was to portray fashion as "a dialogue between the ideas of the moment and those of the past; ... a discourse between the values and creativity of present-day society and those of history." Fashion is considered to be a dialogue between ideas in the moment and past. Fashion responds to everyone's needs and comes from distant cultures and different eras. It is also known for it to be ephemeral and perpetual. Fashion is a form of self-expression and identity. There are fashion trends all over history, telling a story about the people of that time and culture; in specific cultures, clothing and fashion were status symbols.

Each of the various galleries within the exhibit focused on a particular genre of garment form (e.g. gloves, shoes, petticoats, dresses, hats, coats, corsets, stays, stomachers) or on a particular material (e.g., tweed, lace). Further, one gallery was dedicated to the theme of black and white color contrast. Of this le Bourhis wrote that "black and white, especially in dynamic opposition, can symbolize for darkness and light, sinfulness and purity, or death and life."

Together, the galleries focused on what Bourhis called the "surcharged atmosphere of pleasure, luxury, sensuality, and fantasy" of fashion, which "borrows voraciously from all sorts of distant cultures and different eras [choosing] sources of inspiration according to the desires of the period [while] translating them into a taste that reflects the contemporary images of "culture.""
