= Harold Koda =

American fashion scholar

Harold Koda (born January 3, 1950, in Honolulu, Hawaii) is an American fashion scholar, curator, and the former curator-in-chief of the Anna Wintour Costume Center at the Metropolitan Museum of Art.

== Career ==
While at the costume institute, Koda curated or co-curated, among other shows, Schiaparelli and Prada: Impossible Conversations (2012), "Charles James Beyond Fashion" (2014), and "Jacqueline de Ribes: The Art of Style" (2015) He retired from his position at the museum in 2016 and was succeeded in it by Andrew Bolton. Koda is the co-author of upwards of twenty books, including twelve catalogues for exhibitions held at the Metropolitan Museum. On May 5, 2016, Koda was given the "Pratt Fashion Lifetime Achievement Award" by Pratt Institute. The award was presented to him by Simon Doonan.

Koda appears in Andrew Rossi's 2016 documentary film The First Monday in May which is the staging of the Metropolitan Museum's annual Costume Institute Gala. He also appears extensively in the 2010 documentary on fashion photographer Bill Cunningham, Bill Cunningham New York. He co-curated the 2009 Metropolitan Costume Institute exhibition, The Model as Muse: Embodying Fashion.
