= Jacqueline de Ribes =

French aristocrat and fashion icon (1929–2025)

Vicomtesse de Ribes Jacqueline de Ribes
- Born: Jacqueline Bonnin de la Bonninière de Beaumont; July 14, 1929; Paris, 7th arrondissement
- Died: December 30, 2025 (96 years); Tolochenaz, Switzerland
- Resting place: Cimetière de Passy, 16th arrondissement, Paris, France
- Other name: Last Queen of Paris
- Education: Convent of Les Oiseaux, Verneuil-sur-Seine
- Occupations: Fashion designer, socialite, muse
- Known for: Socialite, muse, aristocrat and fashion designer
- Style: Madame la Comtesse de Ribes
- Title: Vicomtesse de Ribes Comtesse de Ribes
- Spouse: Comte Édouard de Ribes (married 1948)
- Children: Elizabeth de Ribes (born 1949) Jean, 8th Comte de Ribes (born 1952)
- Parents: Count Jean de Beaumont (1904-2002) (father); Paule de Rivaud de La Raffinière (1908–1999) (mother)
- Awards: Rodeo Drive Award (1985) International Best-Dressed List (1956) International Best-Dressed Hall of Fame (1962)
- Honours: Ordre national de la Légion d'honneur, Chevalier (2010) "Divine Jacqueline" -spring/summer couture collection dedicated (1999) The Metropolitan Museum of Art Solo Exhibition (2015)

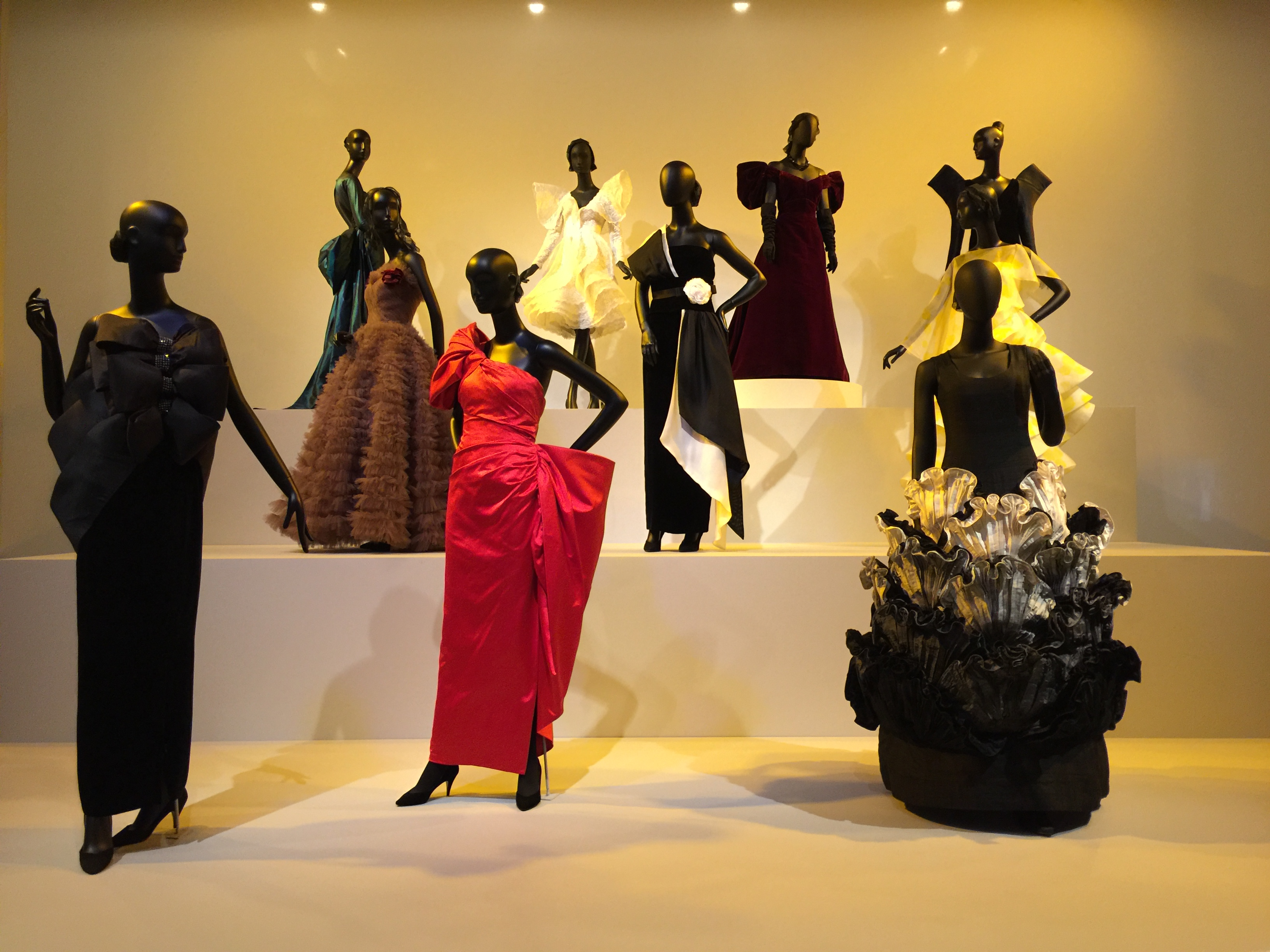
Red gown, designed by Jacqueline de Ribes, "Fabulous Fashion: From Dior's New Look to Now", Philadelphia Museum of Art (2018)

Coat of arms of the family Bonnin de La Bonninière de Beaumont

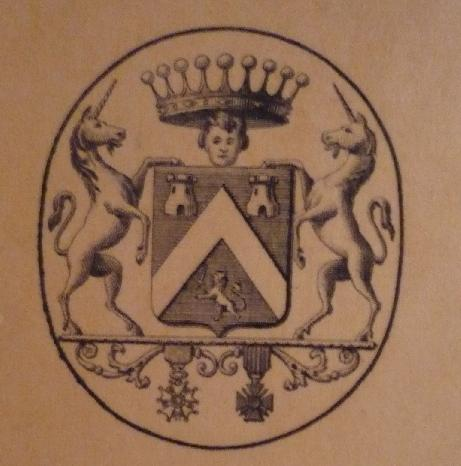
Coat of arms of the Comte de Ribes

Jacqueline, Comtesse de Ribes (14 July 1929 – 30 December 2025) was a French aristocrat, designer, fashion icon, businesswoman, film producer and philanthropist. She was a member of the International Best Dressed List from 1962 on.

== Background ==
Jacqueline Bonnin de La Bonninière de Beaumont was born on 14 July 1929 in Paris to Jean Bonnin de La Bonninière, Comte de Beaumont (1904–2002) and his wife, Paule de Rivaud de La Raffinière (1908–1999), both belonging to the French aristocracy.

The Countess de Ribes was born Jacqueline de Beaumont. She was the daughter of Count Jean de Beaumont, (1904-2002) commander of the Legion of Honor, vice president of the International Olympic Committee, president of the French Academy of Sports and chairman of Cercle de l'Union interalliée; and his wife, Countess Paule (née Rivaud de La Raffinière; 1908–1999), descendant of Olivier Macoux Rivaud de la Raffinière, Baron de la Raffinière, and a woman of letters. Her granddaughter, Alix Van der Kemp (born 1976), is married to Comte Pierre de La Rochefoucauld (born 1977), and they have two daughters and a son.

In 1939, when she was 10, de Ribes's parents sent her and her siblings to Hendaye with a nanny during World War II. They lived in the concierge's cottage, as the main house was requisitioned by the Gestapo. Worried that the U.S. army would land on the beaches of Hendaye and endanger their children, de Ribes's parents moved them again to the château of the Count and Countess Solages in central France. They shared the château with occupying German soldiers, and were liberated by American soldiers in 1944. After the war, Jacqueline returned to school at the convent of Les Oiseaux in Verneuil.

On 30 January 1948, Jacqueline married Vicomte Édouard de Ribes, a successful banker who subsequently became Comte de Ribes and Officer of the Legion of Honour, Croix de guerre 1939–1945. They had two children, Elisabeth Van der Kemp née de Ribes (born 1949) and Jean, Comte de Ribes (born 1952).

De Ribes died in Switzerland on 30 December 2025, at the age of 96.

== Life in fashion and society ==
In the 1950s and 1960s, before she began designing her own collections, de Ribes employed couture dressmakers to create custom garments for her. In the '70s she began modifying these gowns to create elaborate costumes for fancy-dress balls. In 1955 she employed Oleg Cassini to make her custom gowns based on muslin patterns de Ribes cut on the floor of her attic. She employed a young and then unknown Valentino to create the sketches that accompanied them.

For 12 years de Ribes created ready-to-wear collections, using marketing techniques to attract international clients such as Joan Collins, Raquel Welch, Naty Abascal, Barbara Walters, Baroness von Thyssen, Cher, Danielle Steel, Olympia de Rothschild, and Marie-Hélène de Rothschild.

Her first fashion show was held in the home of Yves Saint Laurent. Her creations were positively received, with fashion journalists Hebe Dorsey of the International Herald Tribune and John Fairchild of Women's Wear Daily singing her praises. De Ribes's collection performed well commercially, and she signed an exclusive three-year contract with Saks Fifth Avenue after her first collection debuted. By 1985, her line was grossing $3 million annually.

In 1986, Japanese cosmetics conglomerate Kanebo acquired a minority stake in the company. De Ribes subsequently became unhappy with requests to change the proportions and designs of her collections for Japanese markets.

After being hospitalized for debilitating back pain, de Ribes underwent hemilaminectomy surgery in 1994 which left her unable to walk for three years. During this time she also began to suffer from celiac disease, and due to these health problems was forced to dissolve her company in 1995.

On 14 July 2010, the French President Nicolas Sarkozy decorated her as a Chevalier of the Légion d'honneur at the Elysée Palace.

From 19 November 2015 to 21 February 2016, the Costume Institute at the Metropolitan Museum in New York City featured "The Art of Style", an exhibition featuring items from de Ribes's wardrobe. "The thematic show [included] about sixty ensembles of haute couture and ready-to-wear primarily from her personal archive, dating from 1962 [to 2015]. Also included [were] her creations for fancy-dress balls" as well as numerous photographs and ephemera, recounting "the story of how her interest in fashion developed over decades, from childhood 'dress-up' to the epitome of international style". She attended also the famous Ball of the Kings at Palazzo Serra di Cassano in Naples in 1960 and one of her last interview was about that night and was given to Italian writer and former fashion editor Demetrio Baffa Trasci Amalfitani.

== Theatre and ballet ==
In 1958, she produced the first play performed at the new Recamier Theatre, When Five Years Pass by Federico García Lorca, with Laurent Terzieff and Pascale de Boysson and scenery by Raimundo de Larrain.

After the Marquis de Cuevas died in 1961, de Ribes became the new manager of the International Ballet of the Marquis de Cuevas. Together with Raymundo de Larrain, she produced a version of Prokofiev’s Cinderella with Geraldine Chaplin, daughter of Charlie Chaplin. De Ribes worked 15-hour days during her time managing the ballet, eventually dissolving it three years later due to a lack of resources.

== Producer, film and television ==
Following this experience, she co-produced the initiative for the first French television channel, a film in three episodes from the book by Luigi Barzini, Jr. The Italians, published by Gallimard in 1966. It was during this trip that Luchino Visconti asked her to play the duchesse de Guermantes in his next film In Search ... based on the novel by Marcel Proust; she agreed. The film was cancelled after Visconti fell sick. In the 1970s, she focused her efforts on volunteering for show production and co-produced Eurovision television shows to benefit UNICEF.

== Active "mécène" of many museums and institutions ==
De Ribes chaired the Association of Friends of Foreign Orsay Museum during the Claude Monet exhibition in Tokyo in 1996. She supported several museums and foundations in France. She accepted, at the 2007 Biennale, the chairmanship of Venetian Heritage.

== Humanitarian and charitable activities ==
De Ribes supported humanitarian causes throughout the world. She won the Women of Achievement Award in 1980, alongside Bette Davis, Iris Love, Ann Getty, Dame Sheila Sherlock, and Jessie M. Rattley, among others.

== Ecology ==
De Ribes was a pioneer in the field of nature conservation and ecology. As early as 1974 in the Balearic Islands, she advocated for the respect of the natural beauty and for the survival of the species in the area. She also orchestrated an international campaign to safeguard the Mediterranean island of Espalmaor, a migratory bird refuge, successfully fighting for the classification of the island as a nature reserve.

== Recognition ==
- She appeared for the first time on the International Best Dressed List in 1956
- She was named to the International Best Dressed List Hall of Fame in 1962.
- In 1983, she was voted the "Most Stylish Woman in the World" by Town and Country.
- As a designer, she received the Rodeo Drive Award in 1985.
- In 1999, French designer Jean-Paul Gaultier dedicated his collection to Jacqueline de Ribes.

== See also ==
- 1960s in fashion
