= DRESSX =

American digital fashion company

- Industry: AI, fashion, retail
- Founded: 2020
- Headquarters: Los Angeles, USA
- Products: AI Suite, AI Virtual Try-On, AI Studio, AI Mirror, AI Stylist for retail, Advertising in ChatGPT, AEO/GEO optimization for e-commerce

DRESSX is a fashion technology company that develops virtual try-on tools, including business-to-business solutions for fashion e-commerce.

Founded in Los Angeles in 2020, DRESSX began as a digital fashion marketplace and grew into a company with over 100 million assets distributed across various digital platforms and more than global brand partnerships, including DIESEL, BOSS, Burberry, FENDI, Lacoste, Farfetch, PUMA, Printemps, Ubisoft, EA’s Covet Fashion. It is a female-led, female founded fashion-tech company. DRESSX received 10+ industry awards and recognitions, and was named one of the finalists of LVMH Innovation Award 2022 in the category 3D/Virtual Product Experience & Metaverse.

In August 2021, DRESSX launched its first augmented reality (AR) fashion app. In 2024, DRESSX introduced its generative AI engine DRESSX Gen AI, and by 2025 had launched its first Roblox experience DRESSGO with PUMA, and debuted DRESSX Agent, an AI try-on and shopping platform partnering with over 4000 luxury retailers and brands.

In 2026, DRESSX has focused on AI Suite of B2B solutions for fashion e-commerce, partnering with fashion and luxury brands such as Victoria Beckham, Windsor, Depop, and Loulou de Saison.

In June 2026, DRESSX published an industry report, examining the effect of virtual try-on on purchase intent and conversion among luxury shoppers.

More than 1 million shoppers across over 200 countries found that virtual try-on technology increases purchase intent and conversion among luxury consumers while reducing product returns.

== History ==
DRESSX was founded in Los Angeles, California, in 2020 by Ukrainian entrepreneurs Daria Shapovalova and Natalia Modenova. Julie Krasnienko, ex-Marketing and Business Development Director at Looksery, joined the team as a Head of Product and a founding team member. According to the media (Evening Standard, New York Times) the company was created to address the fashion industry's sustainability problem, offering digital clothes to substitute physical garments in content for social media.

DRESSX uses image/video processing technologies for 3D fashion creation and digital dressing. The platform implements ML algorithms for body recognition and pose detection, render engines, CGI engines, and augmented reality technology for generating digital clothes and for digital dressing.

The first product was a digital fashion marketplace. DRESSX used image/video processing technologies for 3D fashion creation and digital dressing. The platform implemented ML algorithms for body recognition and pose detection, render engines, CGI engines, and augmented reality technology for generating digital clothes and for digital dressing.

In 2021, DRESSX launched its augmented reality (AR) fashion app, enabling users to digitally try on 3D garments and accessories in real time using their mobile devices. The app applied AR technology to overlay photorealistic fashion items onto user-generated photos and videos, offering a virtual dressing experience without the need for physical clothing. It featured AR outfits from both traditional brands, including Balenciaga, American Eagle, and Bershka, and digital-first fashion brands, bridging high fashion with immersive technology.

In December 2021, DRESSX was recognized by Fast Company as one of the Next Big Things in Tech for its innovation in avatar styling.

A new updated version of the DRESSX AR app was released, including a fully redesigned user experience, new subscription models, and a streamlined onboarding process. It introduced the largest library of augmented reality (AR) fashion ever assembled, allowing users to instantly try on and style digital garments in real time. Other enhancements included improved avatar fitting accuracy, upgraded visual rendering, and editorial-quality garment presentation.

In June 2022, the company was a finalist for the LVMH Innovation Award at VivaTech.

In July 2022, DRESSX became the first digital-only fashion company to launch a 3D collection on the Meta Avatar Store, making virtual garments available across Facebook, Instagram, and Horizon Worlds.

In September 2022, DRESSX partnered with Zepeto, a leading metaverse platform, and launched five virtual looks in collaboration with virtual fashion influencer Monica Quin.

At the same time, the companyalso partnered with fashion brand Dundas to release six digital wearables using Roblox’s Layered Clothing technology. Vogue Business named founders Daria Shapovalova and Natalia Modenova among the 100 Innovators shaping the future of fashion and technology.

In 2022, Warner Music announced an investment in DRESSX. In March 2023, it raised an additional $15 million.

The second collection with Dundas followed in January 2023, featuring designs inspired by celebrity and '90s aesthetics. The collaboration utilized Roblox’s Layered Clothing technology to deliver hyperrealistic and size-inclusive garments for avatars, marking Dundas's debut on the platform. The collection featured iconic Dundas designs, including a digital version of the headpiece worn by model Emily Ratajkowski at the 2019 Met Gala.

In March 2023, Fast Company included DRESSX among the Most Innovative Companies in the style category for its AI-powered virtual fashion ecosystem.

In December 2023, Newsweek listed DRESSX among America’s Greatest Disruptors for transforming traditional fashion through digital innovation and avatar commerce.

DRESSX joined the Bitmoji Fashion Marketplace on Snapchat and became its long-term partner, serving over 250 million daily Bitmoji users. The company operates on the platform in two capacities: as a brand releasing its own collections, and as a technical partner collaborating with major fashion brands to launch their virtual stores.

In October 2024, DRESSX served as the production partner for Lacoste's dedicated Bitmoji Fashion Store launch, digitizing the brand's FW 24 collection which included iconic pieces such as the L.12.12 polo shirt, V-neck knit sweaters, and color-block styles. The collaboration allowed Bitmoji users to access both free and paid Lacoste items.

DRESSX introduced DRESSX Gen AI, a proprietary generative AI engine designed to instantly create photorealistic virtual fashion through text-based prompts. The technology enables users to generate high-quality digital outfits by simply describing a desired look, combining cutting-edge AI image synthesis with DRESSX’s fashion expertise.

DRESSX partnered with EA Mobile’s Covet Fashion to launch a fully virtual capsule collection within the mobile styling game. The collaboration marked a first-of-its-kind integration of DRESSX’s products into a mainstream mobile gaming experience.

Select items from the collection were also made available on DRESSXME.com, enabling users to visualize themselves in the same outfits featured in the game. The collaboration reflected a shared vision between DRESSX and Covet Fashion to redefine self-expression and creativity through immersive virtual fashion experiences.

By mid-2025, DRESSX had distributed over 100 million virtual fashion items and was recognized for operating the world’s largest library of virtual outfits.

In summer 2025, DRESSX released its first Roblox experience — DRESSGO, a fashion-focused game. DRESSGO combines fashion discovery with random number generation mechanics, allowing players to collect virtual fashion items by opening boxes, with the option to purchase upgrades to accelerate the collection process.

In September 2025, DRESSX launched DRESSX Agent, AI try-on and shopping platform with more than 4000 luxury retailers, including Farfetch, MyTheresa, and SSENSE, and brands, a million products, and $2 million in merchandise.

In November 2025, DRESSX partnered with Sportmax on an omnichannel AI Mirror activation, combining an in-store pop-up with a six-week virtual try-on integration on the brand's website.

In December 2025, DRESSX launched DRESSX Fashion Rivals on Meta Horizon Worlds, a competitive styling game on VR and mobile. Following Meta's deprioritization of Reality Labs in 2026, DRESSX concluded active development of Fashion Rivals on Meta Horizon. The game remains available exclusively on mobile.

In 2026, DRESSX launched AI-powered virtual try-on with Victoria Beckham, Windsor, and Loulou de Saison, with photo- and video-based try-on.

In June 2026, DRESSX partnered with Depop to offer virtual try-on at live events.

In October 2026, DRESSX introduced two AI commerce analytics tools, AI Visibility and AI Revenue Tracker, through its More Dash Ads platform. AI Visibility tracks mentions and recommendations of brands in responses generated by AI assistants, including ChatGPT, Gemini and Perplexity, while AI Revenue Tracker measures website traffic and purchasing activity associated with those services.

== Operations ==
DRESSX Agent functions as a personal stylist and virtual try-on service. It offers tiered membership levels, an advanced AI try-on system, and a digital twin feature that allows users to visualize outfits from a single selfie. The platform includes a curated marketplace featuring luxury retailers such as MyTheresa, SSENSE, and Farfetch, with purchases completed directly on partner websites.

DRESSX Agent operates on a three-tier membership model: DRESSX Friend, a free plan offering AI-driven styling, Mix & Match tools, image-based search, and avatar creation; DRESSX Member, which adds full virtual try-on capabilities, personalized styling, and the ability to save and share looks; and DRESSX Premium Member (upcoming), which will introduce voice interaction, video-based try-ons, enhanced personalization, and access to exclusive events.
