= Death Becomes Her: A Century of Mourning Attire =

Art exhibit at New York's MMA 2014–2015

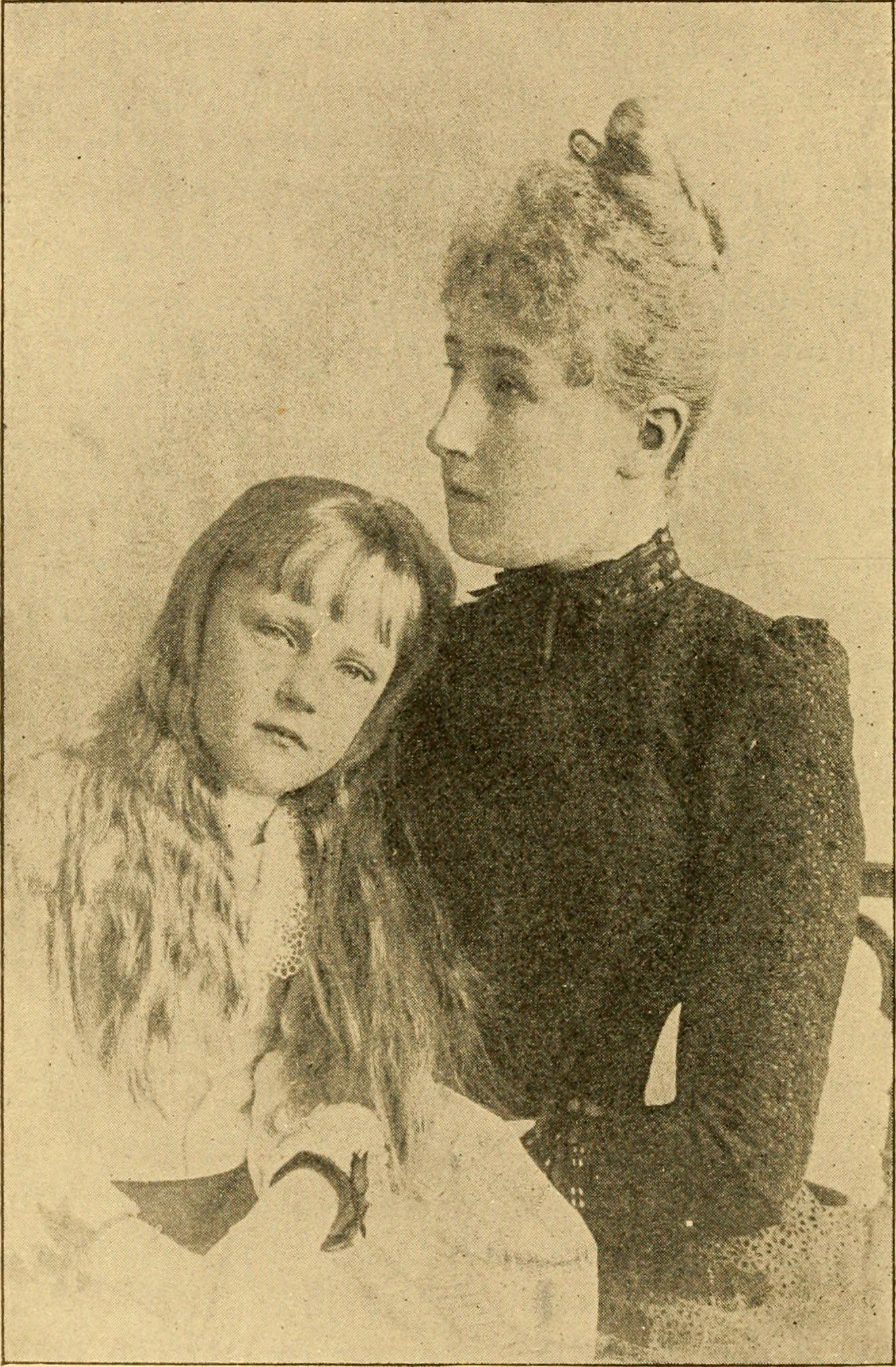
A widow and her daughter in traditional mourning attire.

Death Becomes Her: A Century of Mourning Attire was an exhibition at the Metropolitan Museum of Art that ran from October 21, 2014, to February 1, 2015. The exhibition featured mourning attire from 1815 to 1915, primarily from the collection of the Met's Anna Wintour Costume Center and organized by curator Harold Koda with assistance from Jessica Regan.

In the 19th century, it was uncommon to live past the age of fifty, and deaths during childbirth were frequent, so women of the time often grieved over the deaths of children and other family members. Life expectancy during these times was significantly reduced by a variety of diseases such as smallpox, cholera, typhus, dysentery, yellow fever, scarlet fever, syphilis, measles, malaria, diphtheria, tuberculosis, and influenza. The exhibition depicted a timeline of clothing worn during funerals. Through the different attire depicted, we are able to identify individual stages of mourning and who was lost and their importance or relation to each separate figure. Black remains to be the traditional color worn but grey and navy are also used to represent other circumstances and relationships. A person's financial situation did not hold them back from participating in the lamentation of a loved one. The bereavement attires were displayed to demonstrate the evolution in fashion culture through clothing styles and accessories. This can be observed from the relevant changes in fabrics, from mourning crape to corded silks, and the use of color with shades of gray and mauve.

The color black was associated with the period of mourning for a widow. In Victorian times, widows were believed to be a threat to the social order because as widowed women with unrestrained sexual prowess, they would allegedly tempt men. If a widow were to wear a different color, it would be considered an inappropriate gesture. Although widows could gradually relax their dress code, if a widow were to stop dressing in black too early, she would be assumed to be sexually active. After a few years, a widow would be able to costume more muted colors such as grey or lavender. Following the Civil War and countless deaths, the abundance of widows wearing black came to be viewed as bad morale. Therefore, the dress code for widows was relaxed.

The majority of this exhibit was devoted to the mourning attire worn by ladies rather than by men. But it does portray the plain black suit that men typically wore, complete with a hat with a wide black band, but this was not always worn as the suit was. Even so, the clothing of the women during this time period was emphasized more. They were described as having worn a "mourning crape," or a light crinkled gauze material, processed to get this texture and lusterless appearance, as an attempt to make the outfit consciously bleak. It was also said that women believed that the indulgence of personal grief was incompatible with their duties to themselves.
