= The Model as Muse: Embodying Fashion =

Art exhibit

The Model as Muse: Embodying Fashion was a fashion exhibition at the Metropolitan Museum of Art that ran from May 6 to August 9, 2009. It focused on iconic fashion models of the twentieth century who inspired fashion in their respective eras. Organized by historical period from 1947 to 1997, the exhibition was made possible by Marc Jacobs with additional funding from Condé Nast. It was curated by Harold Koda and Kohle Yohannan.

== Content ==
The exhibition featured photographs of many of the top models from the last half of the twentieth century, such as Twiggy, Jerry Hall, Beverly Johnson, Iman, Kate Moss, Christy Turlington, Naomi Campbell, and Linda Evangelista. It also showcased some of the most prominent dresses and other articles of clothing these women made famous, like the black gown with a white sash Yves Saint Laurent designed for Christian Dior worn by model Dovima as she stood between elephants in a well-known Richard Avedon photo. Designers in the exhibition included Giorgio Armani, Cristóbal Balenciaga, Pierre Cardin, Karl Lagerfeld for Chanel, Christian Dior, Donna Karan, Calvin Klein, Helmut Lang, Ralph Lauren, Prada, Yves Saint Laurent, and Gianni Versace.

== Reception ==
The New York Times review of the exhibition noted, "the exhibition feels in search of a legitimate center, a justification — beyond icon-mongering — to spend so much time looking at pretty faces. By its very title, The Model as Muse presents an idealized relationship between photographer and model, or designer and model, and while much of the work in fashion is collaborative, the fact is that many designers and photographers are major control freaks. And some just outright dismiss the role of models." The Boston Globe called it "a wonderful show." The British Daily Telegraph described it as "a lavish tribute to iconic models who have worked at the forefront of the industry."

== Catalogue ==
An accompanying catalogue was edited by Koda and Yohannan. It was published by MetPublications and Yale University Press. Library Journal called it, "A glossy and admiring look at the last half century of fashion imagery through its most iconic models and the styles they personified. For anyone who loves fashion photography."

== Met Gala ==
The annual gala benefit, known as the "Met Ball," took place on May 4, 2009, with approximately 650 guests including Madonna, Donald Trump and his wife Melania, Donatella Versace, Victoria Beckham, and John Galliano. Marc Jacobs served as the honorary chair of the gala with co-chairs Kate Moss, Justin Timberlake, and Anna Wintour.
