= Irene Lewisohn Costume Reference Library =

Fashion library in New York City

Coordinates: 40.7794°N 73.9631°W

The Costume Institute's Irene Lewisohn Costume Reference Library is located at the Metropolitan Museum of Art. It is more commonly known as The Costume Institute Library. It is known as one of the world's foremost fashion libraries. The collection contains over thirty thousand books, nearly seven hundred periodical titles, and over fifteen hundred designer files. The documents pertain to worldwide fashion and clothing history from the sixteenth century to today.

== History ==
The library is named after the Museum of Costume Art's co-founder Irene Lewisohn. In 1960, as a part of a major renovation of The Costume Institute, the library was named in her honor. By 1983, it was reported that the library was used by the staff and more than 1800 researches each year.

== Collection ==
The library aims to represent the valued diversity and interdisciplinary nature of fashion. The special collections include artist books, exhibition history documentation, designer archives, fashion plates, lookbooks, photography collections, scrapbooks, sketches, textiles samples, and fashion related ephemera. The collection contains over one hundred binders of materials related to exhibitions held or organized by The Met's Costume Institute. The Binders generally include wall labels, exhibition installation images, press releases, invitations, checklists, and more. The collection's fashion plates feature men's, women's, and children's fashion and date between 1700 and 1955 and are organized in over one hundred binders and boxes by date and/or topic. The library also collects reference materials about clothing types and fashion related topics not currently nor generally acquired for the Costume Institute, with library topics including separates, wearable art objects, boutique objects, study objects, fur, wedding dresses, children's clothing, and works on paper.

=== Availability ===
The collection's holdings are available on the Museum's online catalog. The library is primarily for museum curatorial staff to research for exhibitions and publications. According to librarian Julie Lê, curatorial staff uses the library's material to help date and contextualize pieces. Limited appointments are available for outside and qualified researchers, based on the librarian's discretion and availability.

=== Collection sources ===
The library collection began with a number of gifts by donors, curators, and staff. It has since grown though purchases reflecting The Costume Institute Collection's holdings and books acquired for preliminary exhibition research relating to art, film, gender studies, LGBTQIA+ history, literature, music, pop culture, and others. The second largest designer archive at the library was donated by Todd Oldham. Oldham's fashion and design archive records include videotapes, photographs, lookbooks, fabric samples, scrapbooks, and publicity materials. Vera Maxwell also donated a collection of her sketches and other materials. The library's impressive Comme des Garçons collection was primarily donated by the museum's late curator and bibliophile, Richard Martin. The library also has a number of fabric swatches, although separate from the Met's Antonio Ratti Textile Center and Library.

== Instagram notoriety ==
The library is also noted for its Instagram popularity, receiving over 40,000 followers in a little over three years, as well as many accolades from the press.
