= In America: An Anthology of Fashion =

Exhibition at the Metropolitan Museum of Art

In America: An Anthology of Fashion is the 2022 high fashion art exhibition of the Anna Wintour Costume Center, a wing of the Metropolitan Museum of Art (MMA) which houses the collection of the Costume Institute. It is the piece of a two-part exhibit that explores fashion in the United States. This exhibit highlights stylistic narratives and histories of the American Wing Period. Each immersive period rooms reflect America from the 1700s to the 1970s and captures men's and women's fashion. The rooms also display America's domestic life and the influences of cultures, politics, and style at each period.

Within the rooms are a series of focused narratives that reflect larger developments, such as the emergence of an identifiable American style and the rise of the named designer as an individual recognized for their distinct creative vision. In this way, Anthology also provides a historical grounding for the companion exhibition, In America: A Lexicon of Fashion—currently on view in the Anna Wintour Costume Center (Galleries 980 and 981)—which offers an expansive reflection on defining qualities of fashion in the United States. The installations take the form of cinematic vignettes that enliven the stories and highlight the intimate and immersive aspects of the rooms. These fictional tableaux were created by nine film directors: Radha Blank, Janicza Bravo, Sofia Coppola, Julie Dash, Tom Ford, Regina King, Martin Scorsese, Autumn de Wilde, and Chloe Zhao. Seven “case studies” offer in-depth, forensic analyses of individual costumes that function as connecting threads. Together, they comprise an anthology that challenges and complicates received histories, offering a more nuanced and less monolithic reading of American fashion, and American culture more broadly.
