= Sacai =

Japanese luxury fashion brand

- Company type: Private
- Industry: Fashion
- Founded: 1999
- Founder: Chitose Abe
- Headquarters: Tokyo, Japan
- Website: www.sacai.jp

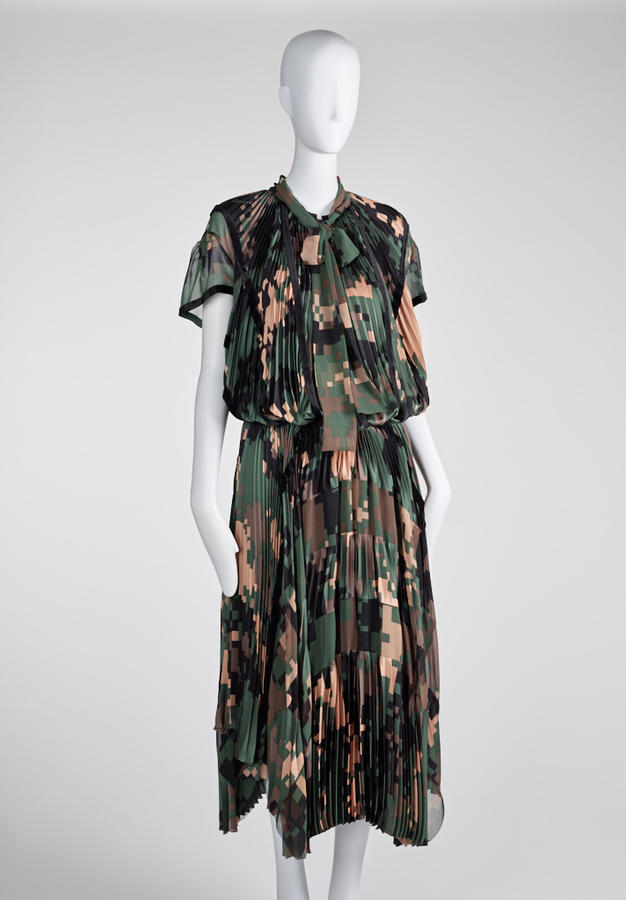
2017 Chitose Abe for Sacai two-piece dress, Fall-Winter collection. Pleated printed silk.

Sacai (stylized in lowercase) is a Japanese luxury fashion brand founded by fashion designer Chitose Abe (née Chitose Sakai) in 1999. Vogue magazine has cited Sacai as influential in breaking down the dichotomy between casual and formal clothing.

== History ==
Abe grew up in Gifu prefecture making clothes for dolls. Her mother was a seamstress. Abe worked as a pattern cutter for Comme des Garçons and later worked for Junya Watanabe.

From 2016 to 2022, Sacai collaborated with Sophie Bille Brahe, The North Face, Beats Electronics, Apple, A.P.C., Nike and Dior.

Claudia Poh interned for Sacai.

== See also ==
- Dover Street Market
- 10 Corso Como
- Colette
