= Anti-fashion =

Styles of dress contrary to popular fashion

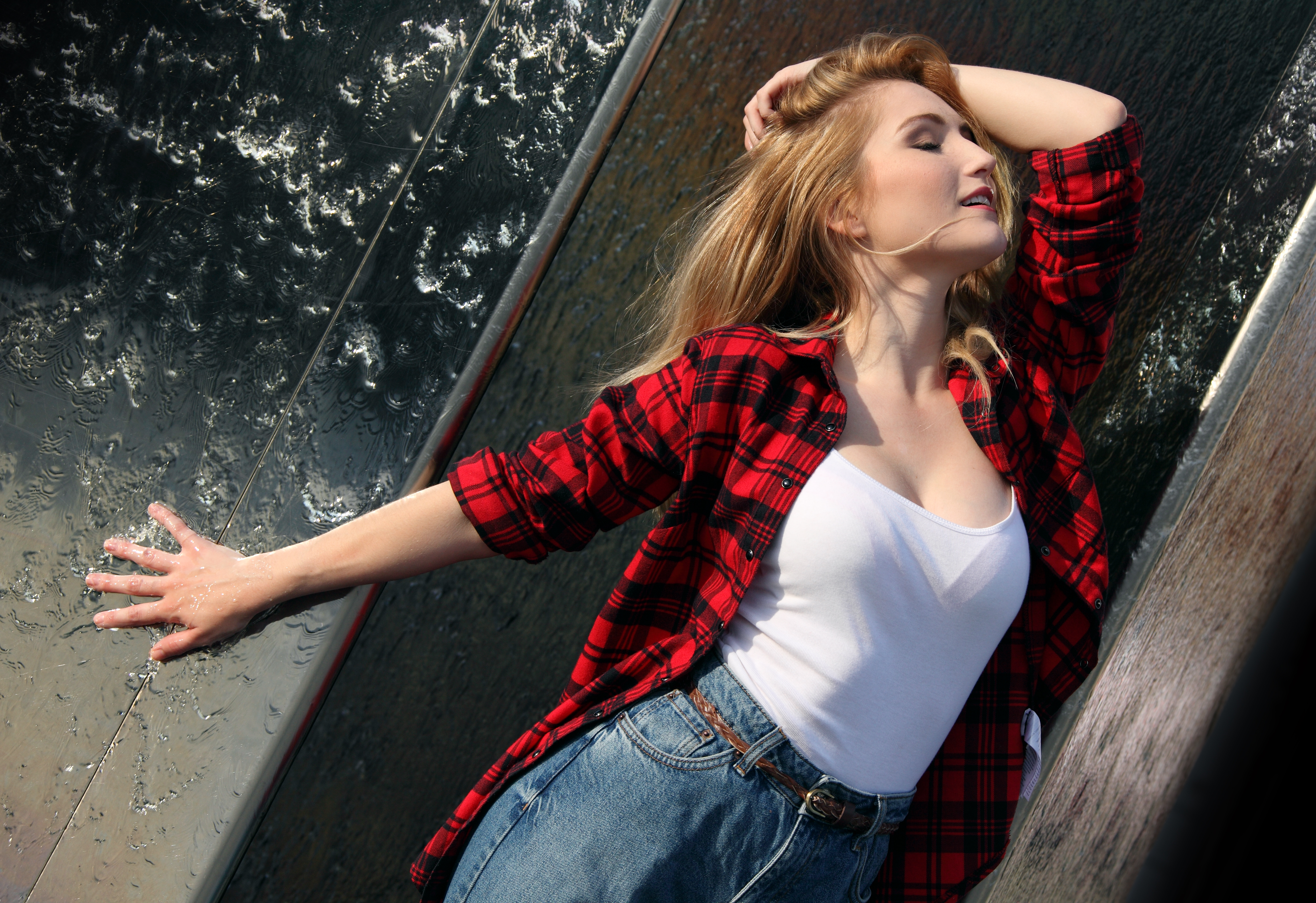
Woman wearing plaid shirt and jeans, an example of anti-fashion dress

Anti-fashion is an umbrella term for various styles of dress that are explicitly contrary to the fashion of the day. Anti-fashion styles may represent an attitude of indifference or may arise from political or practical goals which make fashion a secondary priority. The term is sometimes even used for styles championed by high-profile designers, when they encourage or create trends that do not follow the mainstream fashion of the time.

Anti-fashion is considered radical creativity in apparel. It recombines a hodgepodge of details that dramatically alters current fashions. The newly transformed styles are later incorporated into the mainstream through media hype and commercial sales which reduce its stature. Grunge is an example of the oppositional style of dress while the rational dress of the Victorian era, which allowed ladies to swim or bicycle, is an example of a functional anti-fashion.

== Overview ==
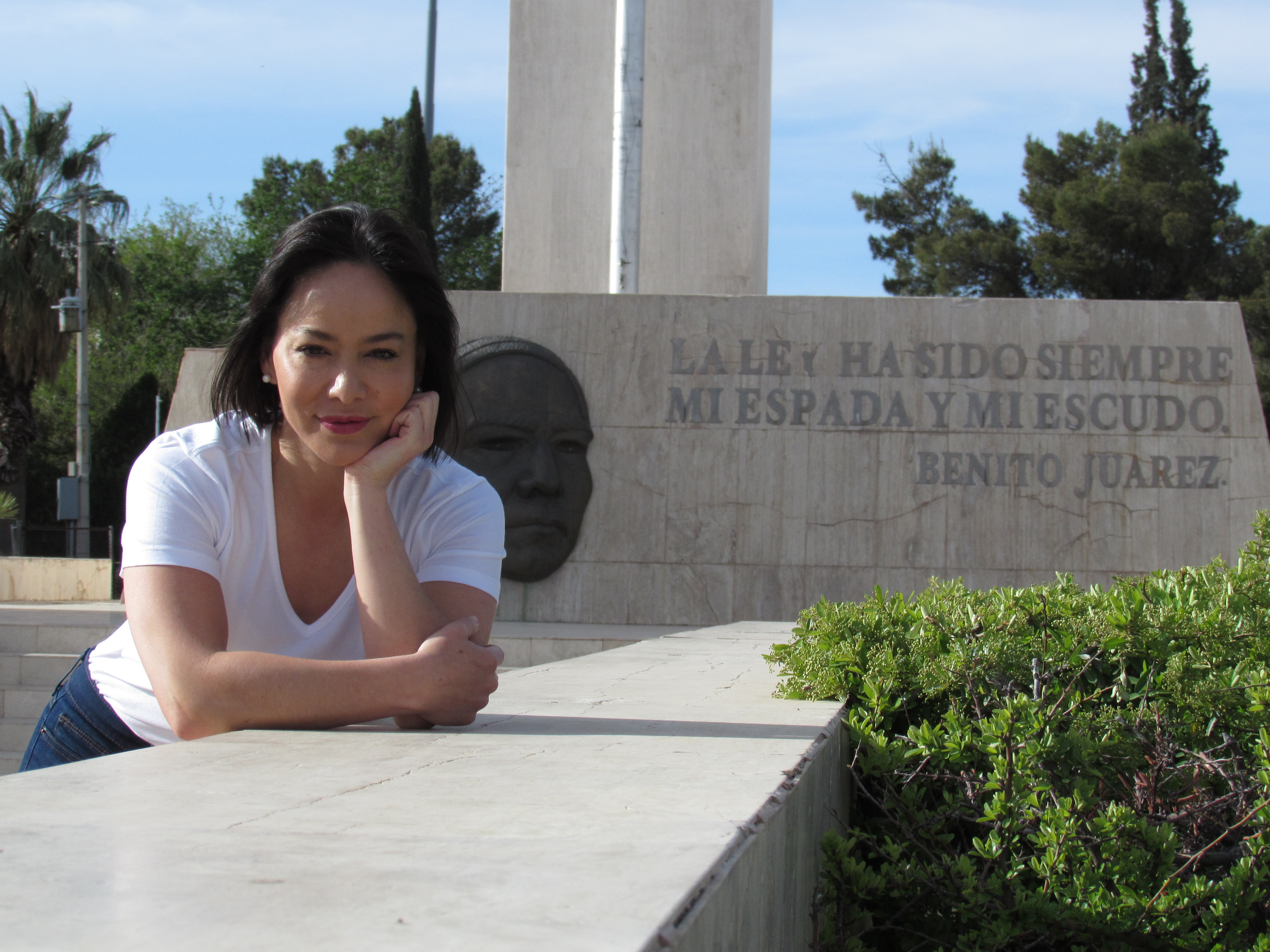
Woman wearing a plain white shirt and jeans

In discussing fashion and the nature of clothes, researchers Robert and Jeanette Lauer discuss the eight meanings of clothing as non-verbal communication, representing people's personalities, clothing as a reflection of moral character, immoral clothing, clothing and conformity, and apparel as indicators of status and desirability. They believe that clothes can be as far-reaching to represent the state of a nation. Fashions, fads, and anti-fashion trends can be connected to one or more of these eight principles. There were practical health reasons that a minority of women promoted radical changes in feminine dress in the early part of the 18th century.

A trend for feminist women to dress in ways that do not follow the norms for women's clothing has been described as anti-fashion, though research suggested many women who dress this way do not choose to label themselves this way, in the opinion of author Samantha Holland this is because the women do not like the confrontational overtones of the term.

An example, this time from the early 20th century, was promoted by the legendary designer Gabrielle Chanel – a "poor girl" woman's style where rich ladies could look like regular women while still dressing in clothes that showed their quality under close inspection. The dress sense of Charles III of the United Kingdom has been described as anti-fashion, in that it reflects indifference to current fashion in favor of traditional style. Anti-fashion has also been used to describe simple fashion adopted by hardcore punks in the 1980s. At its strictest, it consists of a plain white T-shirt, black trousers or plain jeans and black boots, with the hair cut short. In the exhibit at the Metropolitan Museum of Art, Rei Kawakubo/Comme des Garçons Art of the In-Between, fashion/anti-fashion was one of the thematic fashion pairings which were examined.

== History ==
=== 19th century ===
The burden of wearing extremely heavy dresses in all seasons that could not be washed was a health hazard, especially for frail women who might be overly susceptible to disease. Long dresses dragged on unpaved streets and floors carrying filth and germs indoors that affected household members, especially small children. In homes, long dresses were also fire hazards with open fireplaces. Fashionable styles requiring tight corsets, thin shoes or heavy tight hats—although considered beautiful at the time—restricted the wearer's movement.

Alternative forms of daywear were promoted by women's clubs of the time, especially The Dress Reform Association which began in Seneca Falls, NY. in the 1850s, and thus the Bloomer costume was born. It consisted of a bifurcated skirt held close to the ankles, a softly fitted-over dress that required only a non-restricting soft corset. This newsworthy pants-like costume created a huge fashion stir, both positive and negative, nationwide, and only the most daring feminists adopted it. It was not considered ladylike or beautiful by those who thought that only unfeminine non-conformists would dare to wear the new style.

=== 1950s–1980s ===
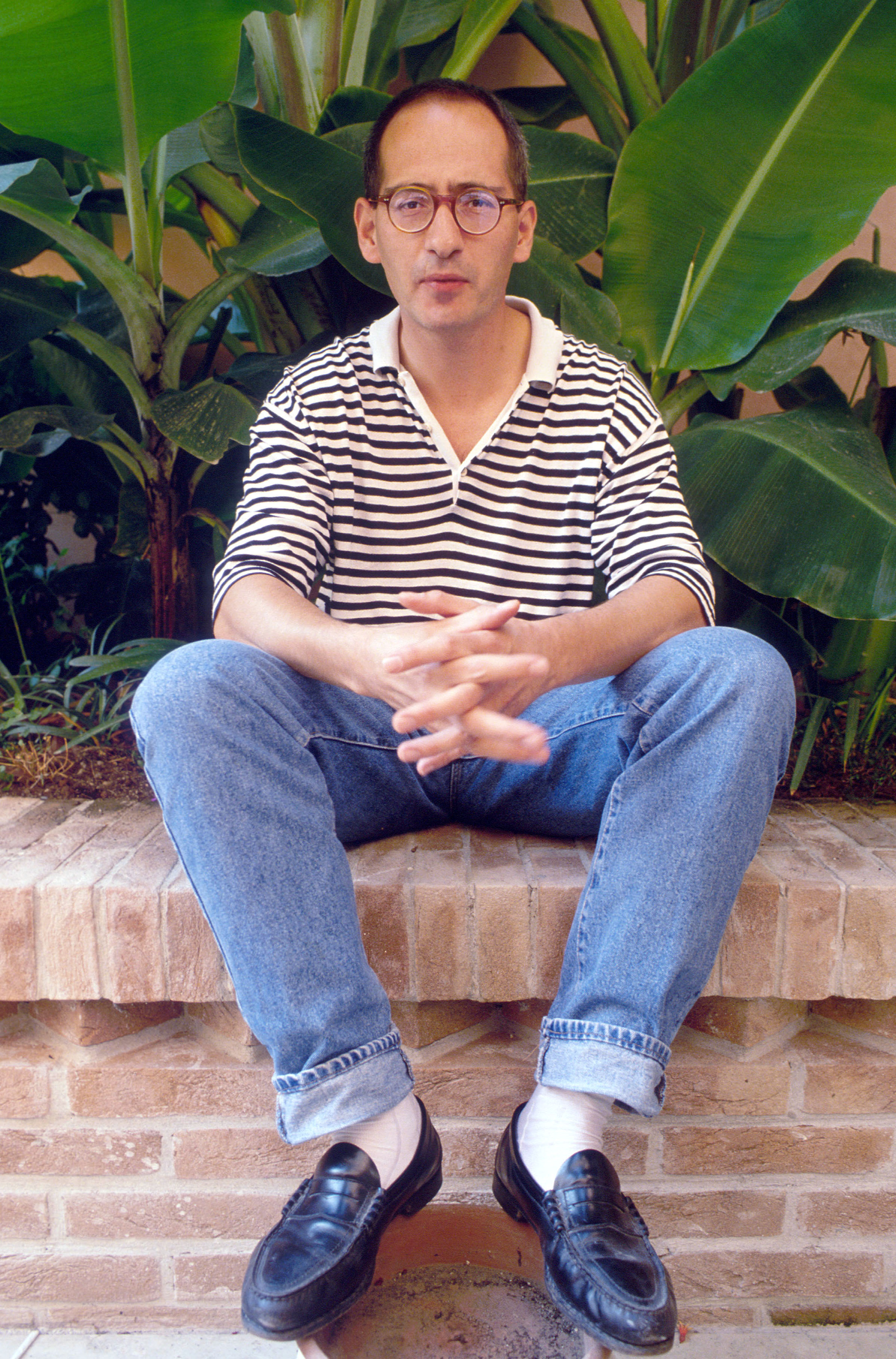
Man in striped shirt and jeans, which became in style from the late 80's to 90's

A period of anti-fashion took place in the 1950s with the advent of rock and roll, especially with young adolescent women. Many young women wore jeans and plaid shirts, simple plain T shirts, and surplus military clothes in rebellion against the feminine gender roles and societal norms of the time. These fashions were the root of many modern anti-fashion trends, such as punk and grunge, decades later. The word grunge originated in the mid-1960s.

Punk fashion arrived later in Great Britain in the 1970s with fashion designer Vivienne Westwood. It was quickly adopted by disillusioned, discontented teenagers. A shop named SEX run by Malcolm McLaren sold clothes with a fetish focus; leather bondage pants, offensive jewelry and T-shirts, and jeans that were ripped and defaced; other materials used to invoke fetishism were rubber and PVC plastic. Punk clothing was often studded and slashed, and adorned with chains and safety pins. This anti-fashion was adopted in response to the fashion-consciousness exhibited by the fans of bands such as the Sex Pistols.

Both Westwood and McLaren led the Punk movement which was short-lived, but newsworthy in the fashion press. It was easy to recognize those who followed the punk community with their spiky brightly-colored Mohawk haircuts, exotic makeup, tattoos, and body piercings. According to Worsley, "Punk style showed how fashion could challenge stereotypes of gender and beauty". By the 1980s, punk influences could be seen around Europe and America, although these blatant and provocative styles fell out of favor by the end of the decade, to be replaced by the anti-styles of the grunge movement.

=== 1990s ===
In the 1990s, a minimalist style described as anti-fashion emerged on both sides of the Atlantic in which young people would typically wear simple clothes such as black jeans and white T-shirts without a visible brand name. At this time, grunge was considered street style, a departure from the emphasis on designer labels and ostentatious looks in the 1980s, seen for example in the exaggerated shoulder lines of the tops worn by both sexes.

Soon, designers such as Donna Karan, Anna Sui, Marc Jacobs, Perry Ellis, Ralph Lauren and others began to take inspiration from fashions on the streets and incorporate those trends into their own designer lines. The fad expired as quickly as it began and the designers looked in other directions for inspiration.

== Designers ==
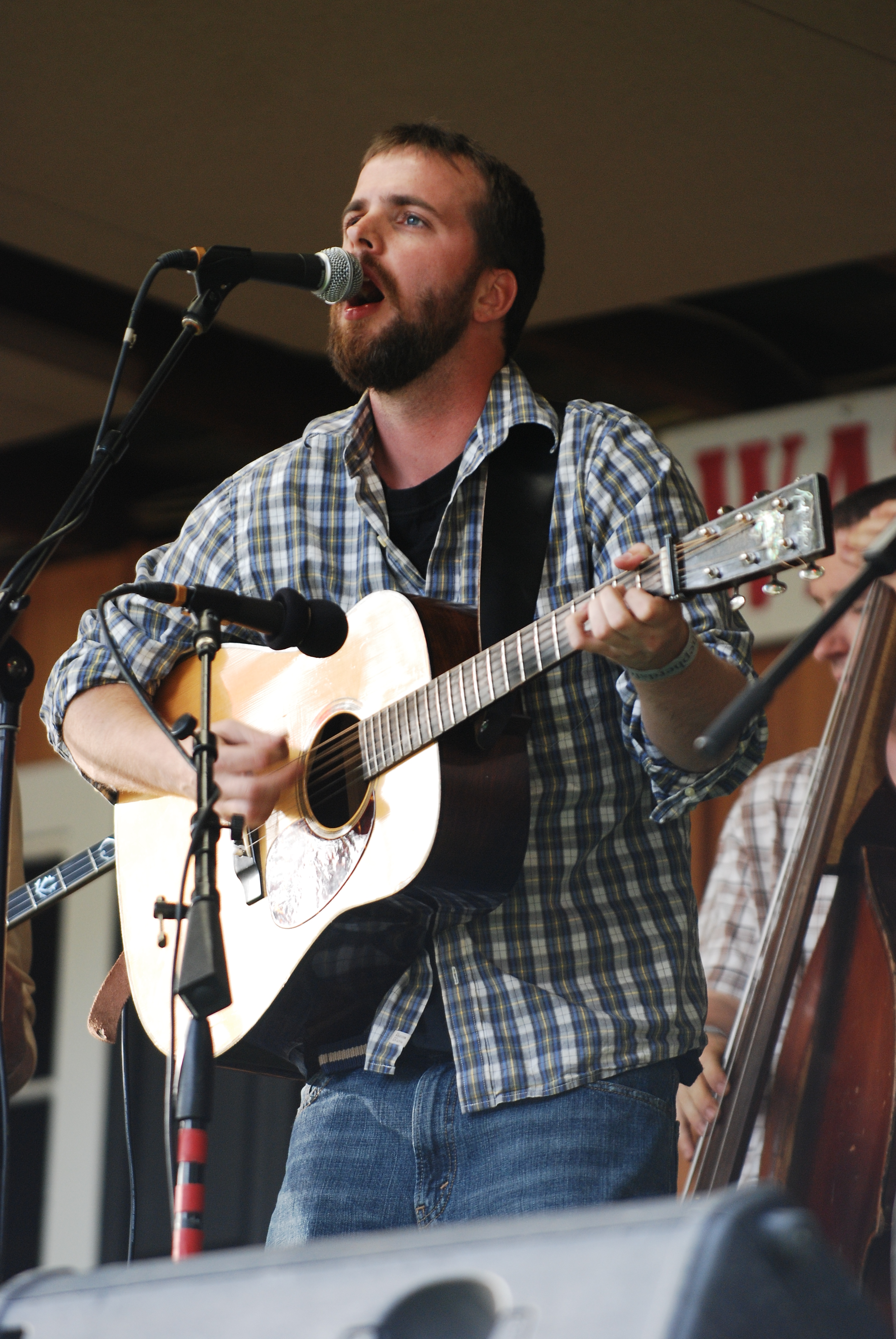
Brennan Gilmore in a plaid shirt and jeans

During this period of time, anti-fashion designers started appearing in Europe and Asia, mainly Japan.

Vivienne Westwood

With the emergence of counter-mainstream consciousness, a punk style that catered to people's thoughts emerged in this context. Punk has a great impact on fashion. The well-known designer Vivienne Westwood, who is known as the mother of punk, started her fashion career with punk. The clothes she designed not only have punk's iconic fetish fashion, restraint elements, pins, chains, and other punk elements but also incorporate traditional designs such as Scottish plaid and court ballet.

The multi-wavy skirts, ruffled piping, pirate hats, and boots with romantic pirate styles published by Westwood in her early days immediately pushed her to the stage of international popularity and gained attention. By the mid-1980s, Westwood began to explore classical and British traditions. By the 1990s Westwood designed irregular, exaggerated and complicated structures by contrasting and matching different materials and colors, which have become Westwood's unique style.

Besides Westwood in Europe, three designers from Japan entered the European fashion scene during the 1980s.

Issey Miyake

Issey Miyake is a strong representative of Asian anti-era designers. The clothes he designs have a distinctive style and are extremely individual, giving the clothing a new aesthetic connotation with unbridled expression. Miyake released his first fashion show in 1971 with great success, and he has since entered the design career of a fashion master.

Rei Kawakubo

Rei Kawakubo is good at using low-chroma fabrics to design clothes. Many of them are designed in the same piece with the same color of black, which can be said it is Kawakubo's representative color. In 1981, Rei Kawakubo held her first press conference at the Paris Fashion Show, where she began to attract the attention of the global fashion industry. Then in the following year, her clothing had a simple nickname: the beggar's outfit; leading to a design trend of loose, deliberate three-dimensional, broken, asymmetric, and not revealing the shape of the body.

Yohji Yamamoto

For Yohji Yamamoto, the most basic concept of anti-fashion is not to follow the trend. Yohji Yamamoto's design style has always been unconventional and gender-neutral, such as designing women's clothing according to the concept of men's clothing. He likes to cover women's body shapes with exaggerated proportions, bringing out the androgynous, asexual aesthetic concept. This new dress concept, which runs counter to the European mainstream, has not only established itself in the fashion industry but has also influenced European designers.

Demeulemeester, Maison Martin Margiela and Raf Simons

In addition, designers such as Ann Demeulemeester, Maison Martin Margiela and Raf Simons are all anti-fashion pioneers. During the 1990s, the anti-fashion movement was at its peak; more designers were willing to put themselves out there to question the idealistic beauty and traditional fashion style. One of the original Antwerp six Ann Demeulemeester debuted her first catwalk show in Paris in 1991, and she was famous for her asymmetry and unbalanced style. Maison Martin Margiela debuted his Salvation Army collection in 1992; it was a sarcastic reaction towards the overflowing meaningless clothes in the fashion industry.

Raf Simons debuted his first menswear collection in 1997 to showcase a sense of rave and the opposite example of traditional men's fashion. The 1990s is a continuation of the 1980s anti-fashion movement but expanded into different aspects and perspectives.

== See also ==
- 1990s in fashion
- Capsule wardrobe
- Normcore
