= Dr. Woo =

American tattoo artist

- Born: 1981 (age 44–45); Los Angeles, California
- Occupation: Tattoo artist
- Organization(s): Hideaway at Suite X Woo; Co-founder, Oxblood

Brian Woo (born 1981), professionally known as Dr. Woo, is an American tattoo artist known for his single-needle, fine-line style of tattooing, producing black and grey, micro-realistic tattoos. He primarily tattoos out of his studio Hideaway at Suite X in Los Angeles. He also has a skincare line, Woo, and co-founded jewelry line Oxblood.

== Biography ==
Woo was raised in Los Angeles to immigrant parents, and started doing stick and poke tattoos to his friends when he was young. His goal was to launch a fashion line, but he was asked by tattooist Mark Mahoney to become his apprentice and ultimately decided to accept.

He became known for his black and grey, fine-line single-needle tattoos while working at Mahoney's Shamrock Social Club. He left in November 2016 to open his own tattoo studio, Hideaway at Suite X. The studio's location is secret and only unveiled to those who have managed to make an appointment. He has also tattooed in Paris, Hong Kong, and New York City, the last of those with a two-week-only Hideaway NYC pop-up in collaboration with Virgil Abloh.

Appointments with him are known to have a two-year waitlist, though he relaxed the waitlist during COVID.

He also founded skincare line Woo. He intended to launch the entire line in early 2020, but due to the onset of COVID, instead launched just one product, a soap, donating the entire net profit to Baby2Baby. He went on to release further products later that year and in 2021.

He co-founded jewelry brand Oxblood with Italian designer Giulia Luchi.

He has collaborated with sacai, Jean Paul Gaultier (during sacai designer Chitose Abe's residency), Roger Dubuis, Converse, Golden Goose, Readymade, and Beltology. His tattoos have been seen on Drake, Miley Cyrus, Brooklyn Beckham, Bella Thorne, Cara Delevingne, Hilary Duff, Cody Simpson, Jaime King, Sam Smith, and others. By February 2018, he had obtained over 1.2 million Instagram followers.

In 2022, he hosted a streaming show, Moving the Needle with Dr. Woo.
