= Christian Astuguevieille =

French artist, designer and perfumer (1946–2026)

Christian Astuguevieille (1946 – 13 February 2026) was a French artist, designer and perfumer. He was the artistic director of perfume at Comme des Garçons Parfums, where he collaborated with Rei Kawakubo on unconventional scents that challenged traditional notions of perfume. He developed "anti-perfumes" with notes of burning rubber and nail polish.

== Life and career ==
Astuguevieille was the only child of a wealthy family. His father, Bernard Astuguevieille, and his mother, Denise, worked in the aeronautics industry. He attended a Montessori school. After studying education at the École Normale Supérieure, he became artistic director of Parfums Molinard. He later held the same position at Rochas for eleven years, and at Nina Ricci.

In 1977, Astuguevieille was invited to the Centre Pompidou to design and lead an educational workshop for children, within the "Children's Workshop." In 1980, he opened a boutique and workshop for jewelry making in the Galerie Vivienne in the 2nd arrondissement of Paris. He created furniture using leather, raffia, straw, linen, and hemp rope.

His first furniture exhibition, at the Yves Gastou Gallery in Paris in 1989, brought him to the attention of the general public.

Rei Kawakubo, whom he met in Tokyo in 1991, offered him the opportunity to assist in the launch of a perfume.

Astuguevieille died on 13 February 2026, at the age of 79.
