= Chitose Abe =

Japanese designer and businesswoman

- Born: Chitose Sakai; 1965 (age 60–61); Gifu Prefecture, Japan
- Occupations: Fashion designer; businesswoman
- Organization(s): Founder and Creative Director of sacai
- Awards: Hypebeast Designer of the Year (2025); Mainichi Fashion Award (2007, 2015)

Chitose Abe (née Sakai; born 1965) is a Japanese fashion designer who founded luxury fashion brand sacai in 1999, after taking a step back from her fashion career to become a mother. She is known for her hybridization-focused style of fashion design. She has garnered many influential awards, including the Hypebeast Designer of the Year award in 2025 and two Mainichi Fashion Awards, one in 2007 and one in 2015.

== Biography ==
She was born in Gifu to a mother who was a seamstress, and quickly became interested in fashion, designing clothes for her dolls. She was known as a trendsetter in school, which she attended in Nagoya, a several-hour daily commute. She attended college in Nagoya before going on to work at World Co. After a year, however, she decided to depart for the more avant-garde Comme des Garçons, where she worked as a pattern-maker, and worked as a pattern-maker for Junya Watanabe when he started his own label.

She left work in 1997 when she became pregnant, but just two years later, decided to launch sacai, starting with just five hand-knitted pieces she made from a 15-euro pack of yarn at a hobby store. The brand rapidly gained attention, and before 2009, both Barneys New York and Colette had bought clothes from her to sell, so in 2009, she made her debut in Paris, and two years later, her debut runway.

Her clothing is known for combining several contrasting statements, but her signature designing style is one she created called "hybridization", where two or more garments are fused. She is also known for making a point of personally wearing every article of clothing she designs herself.

She was invited as the first guest designer to reinterpret outfits from the archives of Gaultier.

She has collaborated with tattoo artist Dr. Woo, Nike, Birkenstock, The New York Times, Vans, Ugg, Levi, and Edison Chen.

Her outfits have been worn by Queen Rania of Jordan, Michelle Obama, Pharrell Williams, Rihanna, Lupita Nyong'o, and Sofia Coppola, and Karl Lagerfeld called her "one of the most interesting designers working today".

She won the Mainichi Fashion Award in both 2007 and 2015. She has been a member of the Business of Fashion 500 since 2013. She was named the Hypebeast Designer of the Year in 2025.
