= Sekai =

Sekai (Japanese for "world") may refer to:

- Sekai (magazine), a Japanese political magazine
- "Sekai" (song), a 2006 song by Japanese singer-songwriter Chara
- "Sekai", by Christian Fennesz
- "Sekai", by Chris Berry
- "Sekai", by Sticks and Stones (Scottish band)
- "Sekai", an AI-powered app for iOS.

People with the given name Sekai include:

- Koh Se-kai (born 1934), Taiwanese historian
- Sekai Holland (born 1942), Zimbabwean politician
- Sekai Nzenza (born 1959), Zimbabwean writer
- Sekai Machache (born 1989), Zimbabwean visual artist and curator
- Sekai (dancer), (born 1991), Japanese dancer

== See also ==
- Sakai (disambiguation)
