= Sakai (name) =

Sakai (written 酒井,堺,坂井) is both a Japanese surname and a given name. Notable people with the name include:

== Surname ==
- Chitose Abe ne Sakai (born 1965), Japanese fashion designer
- Atsushi Sakai (born 1983), Japanese professional wrestler
- Frankie Sakai (1929–1996), Japanese comedian
- Gotoku Sakai (born 1991), Japanese football player
- Hideyuki Sakai (born 1973), Japanese professional Go player
- Hirofumi Sakai (born 1965), Japanese retired race walker
- Hiroki Sakai (born 1990), Japanese professional footballer
- Hiroko Sakai (born 1978), Japanese softball player
- Hiroyuki Sakai (born 1942), Japanese chef
- Sakai Hōitsu (1761–1828), Japanese painter
- Izumi Sakai (1967–2007), Japanese singer-songwriter
- Jin Sakai (born 1247), Japanese Samurai, Politician
- Kanako Sakai (born 1986), Japanese voice actress
- Katsuyuki Sakai (born 1988), Japanese rugby union player
- Kazufumi Sakai (born 1947), Japanese basketball player
- Keikō Sakai (born 1972), Japanese voice actor
- Kenichi Sakai (born 1982), Japanese professional wrestler
- Kiyoshi Sakai, Japanese anime producer and animator
- Kōdai Sakai (born 1986), Japanese voice actor
- Kōji Sakai (1885–1973), Japanese lieutenant general
- Maki Sakai (born 1970), Japanese actress
- Manabu Sakai (born 1965), Japanese politician
- Masaaki Sakai (born 1946), Japanese actor, singer and martial artist
- Sakai Masahisa (?–1570), Japanese samurai
- Masato Sakai (born 1973), Japanese actor
- Masatoshi Sakai (酒井政利, died 2021), record producer
- Miki Sakai (born 1978), Japanese actress and singer
- Mikio Sakai (born 1970), Japanese singer-songwriter
- Munehisa Sakai (born 1971), Japanese anime director
- Natsumi Sakai (swimmer) (born 2001), Japanese swimmer
- Nick Sakai, Japanese-American actor and producer
- Noriko Sakai (born 1971), Japanese singer and actress
- Richard Sakai (born 1954), American television and film producer
- Saburō Sakai (1916–2000), Japanese naval aviator
- Seth Sakai (1932–2007), American actor
- Shiho Sakai (born 1990), Japanese swimmer
- Sho Sakai (born 1992), Japanese diver
- Shogo Sakai (composer) (born 1960), Japanese composer
- Shoichiro Sakai (born 1928), Japanese mathematician
- Stan Sakai (born 1953), Japanese-American cartoonist and comic book creator
- Sumie Sakai (born 1971), Japanese professional wrestler
- Sakai Moka (born 2004), Japanese singer, member of girl group ILLIT
- Sakai Tadaaki (1813–1873), Japanese feudal lord
- Sakai Tadakatsu (1587–1662), Japanese samurai and feudal lord
- Sakai Tadakatsu (Shōnai) (1594–1647), Japanese samurai
- Sakai Tadakiyo (1624–1681), Japanese feudal lord and government official
- Sakai Tadamochi (1725–1775), Japanese feudal lord
- Sakai Tadatsugu (1527–1596), Japanese military commander
- Sakai Tadayo (1572–1636), Japanese feudal lord and government official
- Sakai Tadayuki (1770–1828), Japanese feudal lord
- Takao Sakai (born 1959), Japanese bobsledder
- Takashi Sakai (1887–1946), Japanese lieutenant general
- Tatsuya Sakai (born 1990), Japanese footballer
- Tatsuya Sakai (marksman), Japanese sport shooter
- Tomohito Sakai (born 1993), Japanese professional baseball player
- Tomoyuki Sakai (born 1979), Japanese former football player
- Toshihiko Sakai (1871–1933), Japanese socialist
- Toshio Sakai (1940–1999), Japanese photographer
- Toshio Sakai (Go player) (1920–1983), Japanese professional Go player
- Toshiyuki Sakai (born 1964), Japanese ice hockey player
- Yoshihiro Sakai (born 1977), Japanese professional wrestler
- Yoshinori Sakai (born 1945), Japanese athlete
- Yoshio Sakai (born 1910), Japanese field hockey player
- Yuki Sakai (footballer, born 1989), Japanese football player

== Given name ==
- Sakai Tanaka (born 1961), Japanese freelance journalist

== See also ==
- Sakai (disambiguation) for other uses of the word
