= Claudia Poh =

Singaporean fashion designer

- Born: 1996 (age 29–30); Singapore
- Education: Parsons School of Design (BFA)
- Occupation: Fashion designer
- Organization: Founder of Werable

Claudia Poh (born 1996) is a Singaporean fashion designer known for her brand Werable, which emphasizes creating fashionable adaptive clothing, and which was inspired by Poh's grandmother. Werable's first collection was launched in June 2022. She is also known for co-founding the design firm Cair Collective together with a former classmate.

== Biography ==
Poh was born in 1996 in Singapore. At 16, she began attending Parsons School of Design, and spent two years at Parsons School of Design in New York. She spent three seasons as an intern at sacai and also interned for Ashley Isham in Paris. She also created the Cair Collective at this time with classmate Amy Yu Chen, which won the 2018 Parsons Social Innovation Award.

Inspired by designing clothes for her grandmother, who had reduced mobility after a minor stroke, she became focused on adaptive clothing, but finding struggles in New York, returned to Singapore, where she received funding from a backer to start her own adaptive clothing brand, Werable.

She was awarded the Vogue Singapore x TaFF Innovation Prize in 2021 as she continued preparing for Werable's first clothing release, which occurred in June 2022. Her designs have emphasized easy-to-wear occasionwear that can be put on with only one hand and camouflage-assisting clothing, such as her Transformable Bolero with a hidden sling. Many of her designs don't include zippers or buttons, instead using magnetic hooks. She also offers alteration and bespoke tailoring services to make existing clothes more accessible.

She was made a part of DesignSingapore's Good Design Research Initiative. She has collaborated with Yip Pin Xiu for her "It Is Only In Water I Can Move Freely" collection and with Toyota and Toh Wei Soong for their "Start your Impossible Hero" collection in 2024. Her designs were shown at a fundraiser for the Stroke Support Station in Singapore in 2023.

She designed her first bag, called the Wishbone Bag and inspired by sling bags, in 2025 and premiered it at Milan Fashion Week.
