= Comme des Garçons Parfums =

Japanese fashion brand

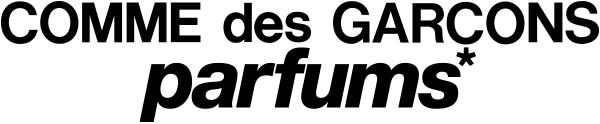
- Type: Diffusion line
- Industry: Consumer Goods
- Founded: 1993; 33 years ago
- Founders: Rei Kawakubo, Christian Astuguevieille
- Headquarters: Tokyo, Japan (de facto); Paris, France (de jure)
- Key people: Adrian Joffe; CEO; Christian Astuguevieille; Creative Director
- Products: Perfumes
- Website: www.comme-des-garcons-parfum.com

Comme des Garçons Parfums is the perfume line of the Comme des Garçons brand. It was formed in 1993 as a collaboration between founder Rei Kawakubo, and perfume veteran Christian Astuguevieille. The line released its first fragrance, Eau de Parfum, in 1994.

The brand is known for creating unorthodox scents and bottles, such as the anti-perfume Concrete, so called as it consists of mainly synthetic chemicals and irregular notes (the scent is meant to smell like concrete after rain) is sold in a bottle made of concrete.

In 2002, the brand signed a licensing deal with perfume giant Puig, but maintained its own distribution and production rights. Fragrances are continuously produced regardless of success, as CEO Adrian Joffe believes "sometimes perfumes, like artwork, are ahead of their time, so they might find success later". As of 2015, the perfume business only made up around 5% of the brand's $200 million in total sales.

The brand has also collaborated with artists such as Kaws and Pharrell, and brands like Stephen Jones, ERL and Monocle.
