= Sakai (disambiguation) =

Sakai is a city in Osaka Prefecture, Japan.

Sakai may also refer to:

== Ethnic groups ==
Sakai is a term historically used to refer to indigenous ethnic groups of the Malay peninsula and Sumatra, including:

- Orang Asli, the indigenous peoples of peninsular Malaysia
- Semang, an indigenous people of the northern Malay Peninsula, a subgroup of Orang Asli
- Senoi, an indigenous people of the Malay Peninsula, another subgroup of Orang Asli
- Maniq people, an indigenous group in southern Thailand
- Sakai people (Indonesia), a tribal community in Malaysia and Indonesia

== Personal names ==
- Sakai (name), Japanese surnames written with various kanji
- Sakai clan, a Japanese clan

== Places ==
- Sakai, Fukui, a city in Fukui Prefecture, Japan
- Sakai District, Fukui, a district in Fukui Prefecture, Japan, that was dissolved in 2006
- Sakai, Fukui (town), a neighborhood of present-day Sakai city, Fukui
- Sakai, Gunma, a former town in Gunma Prefecture, Japan
- Sakai, Ibaraki, a town in Ibaraki Prefecture, Japan
- Sakai, Nagano, a village in Nagano Prefecture, Japan

== Transportation ==
- Sakai Line, a railway line of West Japan Railway Company between Yonago and Sakaiminato in Tottori Prefecture, Japan
- Sakai Station, a train station on the Nankai Main Line in Sakai, Osaka Prefecture, Japan

== Other uses ==
- Sakai (software), a web application and learning management system for education
- Aslian languages, a group of languages spoken by the Orang Asli

== See also ==
- Saikai, Nagasaki, a city with a similar-sounding name in Nagasaki, Japan
- Macario Sakay (1878-1907), Filipino general
- Sekai (disambiguation)
