= Dover Street Market =

Multi-brand retailer

Coordinates: 51.5086°N 0.1423°W

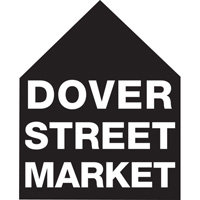
- Industry: Retail
- Founded: September 2004; 22 years ago
- Founders: Rei Kawakubo; Adrian Joffe
- Number of locations: 7: London; Ginza; New York; Singapore; Beijing; Los Angeles; Paris
- Products: Clothing, shoes, accessories
- Website: www.doverstreetmarket.com

Dover Street Market is a multi-brand retailer originally located on Dover Street, in Mayfair, London. It has stores in New York City, Tokyo, Singapore, Paris, Beijing and Los Angeles.

Dover Street Market was created by Rei Kawakubo of Japanese fashion label Comme des Garçons and her husband Adrian Joffe. The store sells Comme des Garçons brands, as well as complementary high fashion and streetwear brands such as Brain Dead, Daniela Gregis, Gucci, JW Anderson, LOEWE, Maison Margiela, Nike, Palace, Rick Owens, sacai, Stüssy, Supreme, The Row, Valentino and many other brands.

== Concept ==
Dover Street Market is a retailer that mainly sells high fashion products, but also features items from more urban, streetwear brands. The concept of Dover Street Market was largely based upon the Kensington Market that was the fashion hub for Britain for over 40 years. Taking from Kensington Market, Rei Kawakubo and Adrian Joffe sought to create a store that aimed to be a stockist for their own brand, Comme des Garçons, as well as other brands and designers that they saw fit to curate their store with. The aesthetic direction that Kawakubo and Joffe had in mind was a very unorthodox approach compared to how usual high department stores looked like. With their particular direction in mind, Dover Street Market over the years has collaborated with the Frieze Art Fair, the Michael Hoppen Gallery, and the Institute of Contemporary Arts (ICA) to showcase work throughout the store. Kawakubo described Dover Street Market as "beautiful chaos".

== Collaboration ==
Dover Street Market has worked on a wide variety of collaborations from various streetwear and high fashion brands. Many collaborations are in celebration of milestones or to commemorate the opening of a new Dover Street Market store. Frequent collaborators include Commes des Garçons, Gucci, Nike, Palace, and Stüssy.

=== 15th Anniversary "MONOCHROMARKET" Capsule ===
On 29 November 2019 Dover Street Market's largest collaboration to date was released. The multi-brand capsule titled MONOCHROMARKET had various pieces consisting of clothes, accessories, jewelry, and accessories. Each of the pieces from the collaboration share a monochromatic motif to go with the overall theme of the capsule. The collaboration was split into two releases with the first one releasing online and then later a physical release at their London location. Of the 60 brands partaking in the collaboration, some of the more notable ones consist of A Bathing Ape, Anti Social Social Club, Bottega Veneta, Comme des Garçons, Kaws, Lacoste, Nike, Palace, sacai, Stüssy, The North Face, Undercover, and Vans.

== History ==
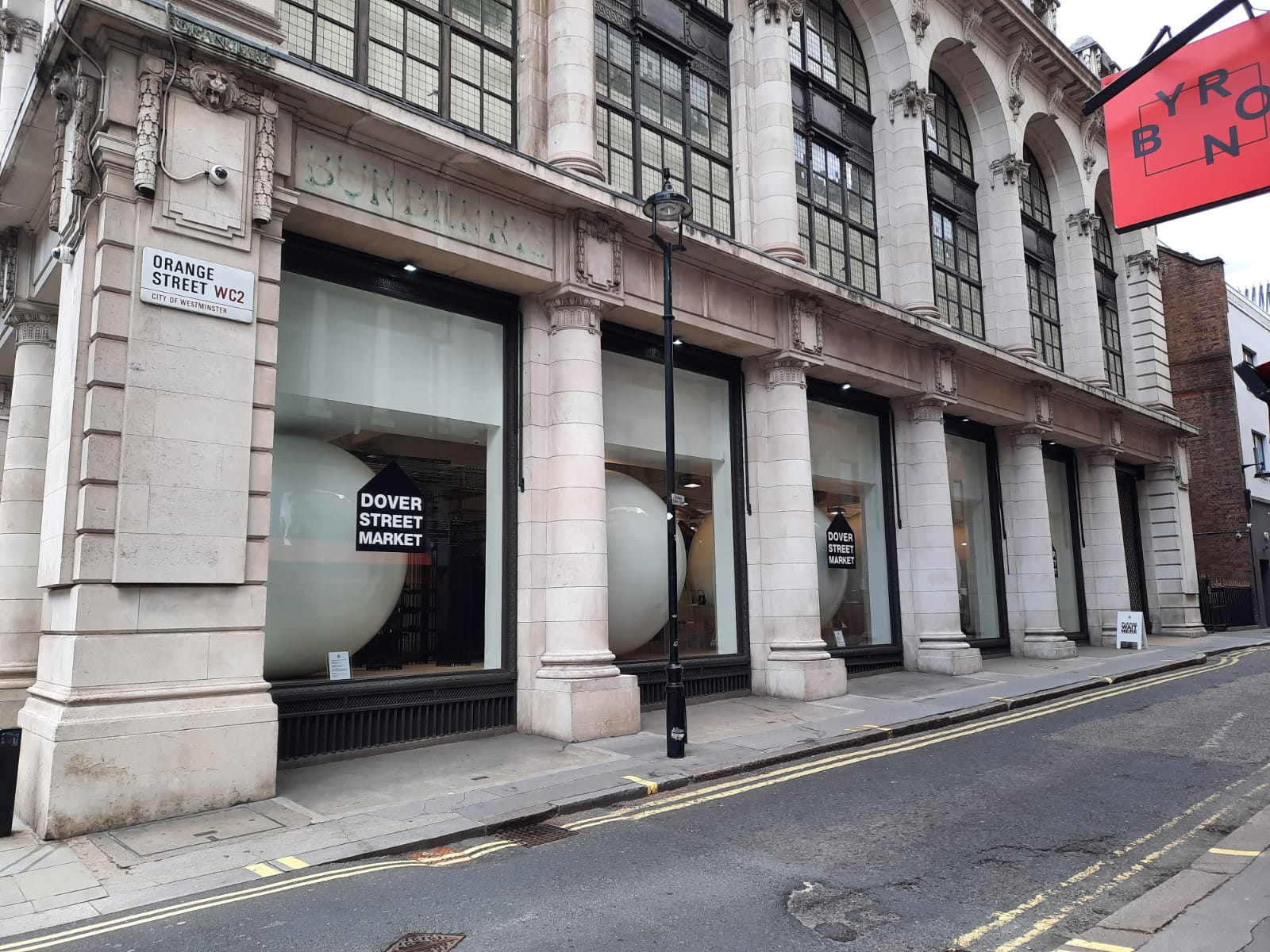
A picture of Dover Street Market in its current location in London

The first Dover Street Market opened on 10 September 2004 on 17–18 Dover Street, in Mayfair, London. In March 2016 the original store relocated to the former Burberry building (erected in 1912 by Thomas Burberry) on Haymarket (South Piccadilly).

The original Dover Street Market (17-18 Dover Street, London) used to be home of the Institute of Contemporary Arts (ICA) in May 1950.

The London store was ranked by Complex as the #2 best store in the world in 2013.

== Locations ==
Locations outside London include:

- Dover Street Market Ginza opened in 2012 in Tokyo.
- Dover Street Market New York opened in December 2013 in Manhattan's Murray Hill in the old New York School of Applied Design building at 160 Lexington Avenue.
- Dover Street Market Singapore in a former British Army barracks on Dempsey Hill, opened in July 2017. It is the only ground-floor only location, and has a 12,325 square-feet landscape.
- Dover Street Market Beijing, turned into a Dover Street Market in February 2018, previously a joint venture of I.T and Dover Street Market called I.T Beijing Market.
- Dover Street Market Los Angeles opened fall 2018 in the Arts District.
- Dover Street Parfums Market opened in October 2019 in Paris, a few minutes walk away from the Musée Picasso. It is the first location to only exclusively sell beauty and cosmetic products.
- Dover Street Market Paris opened in May 2024, inside a 17th-century mansion in the Marais district. It is the only location that also includes an exhibition space, which is housed in its basement.

The London, Tokyo, Paris, Los Angeles, and New York stores all have a Rose Bakery café, created by Rose Carrarini and her husband Jean Charles.

== See also ==
- 10 Corso Como
- Colette
