= Merz b. Schwanen =

German clothing company

- Type: Private
- Industry: Clothing; Accessories
- Founded: 2011
- Headquarters: Berlin, Germany
- Key people: Peter Plotnicki (Owner, CEO); Gitta Plotnicki (Creative Director, Co-Owner)
- Products: Fashion; Accessories
- Owner: Peter Plotnicki
- Website: merzbschwanen.com

Merz b. Schwanen is a German clothing company known to produce on original loop-wheelers with organic materials in Germany.

== History ==
Merz b. Schwanen was originally founded by Balthasar Merz as Balthasar Merz beim Schwanen in the Swabian Alps in 1911 and remained a family owned business until 2008.

Globalization processes dominated the following decades of the 20th century, which caused a decline of the German textile industry because of companies that outsourced parts of their value chain to low-wage countries. Eventually Merz b. Schwanen could not keep up with those companies and was forced to close its gates in 2008 due to a lack of orders.

== Relaunch ==
After finding an original Balthasar Merz beim Schwanen Henley shirt at a flea market in Berlin, menswear designer Peter Plotnicki and his wife Gitta teamed up with one of the last remaining textile factories in Albstadt, a small town on the Swabian Jura. After reevaluating the traditional way of production by using the same old loopwheelers and receiving the rights to utilize the name "Merz b. Schwanen" from descendants of Balthasar Merz, the brand was relaunched in 2011. The first Menswear collection was shown at the Bread & Butter tradeshow in January 2011 in Berlin. All products are designed by Peter and Gitta Plotnicki in Berlin, where the company's headquarter is based. The production is still located in Albstadt. Since its release, Merz b. Schwanen is sold in more than 35 countries.

The brand has been collaborating with brands and designers like Nigel Cabourn, Junya Watanabe, Rowing Blazers and Monocle

== Products ==
The company produces T-shirts, Henley shirts, sweatshirts, sweatpants, undergarments and socks for men and women with styles referencing vintage workwear and sportswear to contemporary garments. The shirts have been praised by fashion insiders such as Nick Carvell from British GQ as one of the most comfortable, as well as best-looking shirts, one will own.

Most garments are made of 100% organic cotton from Greece without chemical finishings, with different thicknesses or alternatively of cotton blends with Viscose or Merino wool.

Another characteristic of Merz b. Schwanen garments is the woven label which is manufactured with a hand-made punch cards on historical looms from the 19th century.

== Ethical sourcing ==
In 2025, Merz b. Schwanen signed a brand letter of intent calling on the Australian wool industry to end the practice of mulesing.
