= Comme des Garçons =

Japanese fashion brand

Comme des Garçons Co., Ltd.
- Type: Public company
- Industry: Fashion
- Founded: 1969; 57 years ago
- Founder: Rei Kawakubo
- Headquarters: Tokyo, Japan (de jure); Paris, France (de facto)
- Key people: Adrian Joffe (CEO); Junya Watanabe (Designer); Tao Kurihara (Designer); Kei Ninomiya (Designer)
- Products: Apparel, accessories, perfumes
- Number of employees: 800 est. (2011)
- Website: comme-des-garcons.com

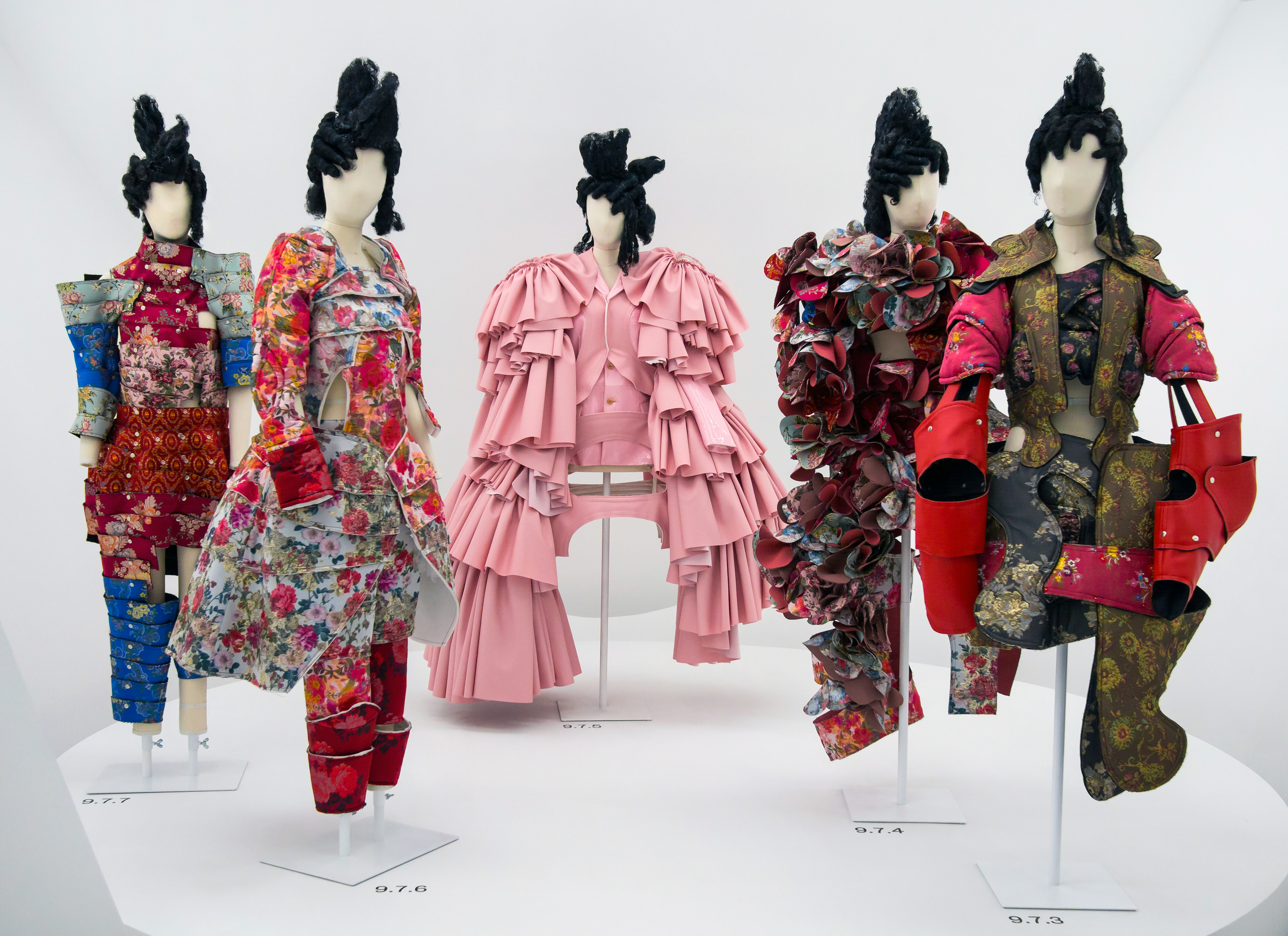
Comme des Garçons garments on display at the Metropolitan Museum of Art

Comme des Garçons (CDG, pronounced [kɔm de ɡaʁsɔ̃]) is a Japanese fashion label, founded by Rei Kawakubo in 1969. It is based in Paris, where its main office is located. The label has expanded to include jewelry and perfume (under the brand Comme des Garçons Parfums).

The company shows its collections during Paris Fashion Week and Paris Men's Fashion Week. In 2017, it was reported that the company and its affiliates generated a revenue "of over $280 million a year".

== History ==
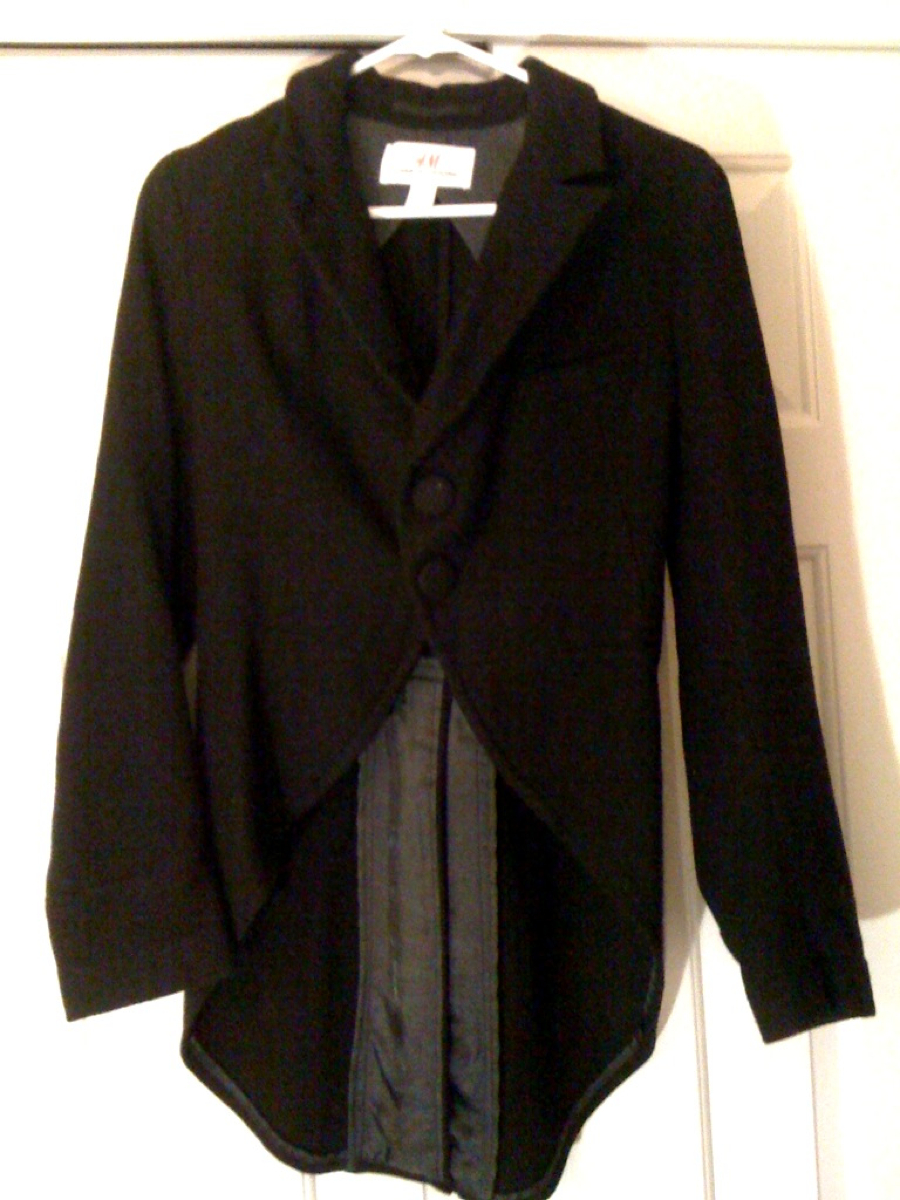
Comme des Garçons for H&M tuxedo jacket, 2009

The label was started in Tokyo by Rei Kawakubo in 1969 and established as a company in 1973. The brand's name was inspired by Françoise Hardy's 1962 song "Tous les garçons et les filles", particularly from the line "Comme les garçons et les filles de mon âge" ("like the boys and girls my age"). The brand became successful in Japan in the 1970s and a menswear line was added in 1978. In 1981, the company had a debut show in Paris. Kawakubo's heavy use of black distressed fabrics, and unfinished seams were viewed negatively by French critics.

Throughout the 1980s, its clothes were often associated with a distressed and punk-oriented style. In 1982, Kawakubo's collection "Destroy" was heavily criticised. Women's Wear Daily called it the "Hiroshima bag lady look", and the Associated Press proclaimed Kawakubo the "high priestess of the Jap wrap". Unusual styles continued through the 1990s, many of which were disliked by experts.

In 1993, the company created its perfume line, Comme des Garçons Parfums.

In 2004, the company split its business into handmade garments produced in France, and non-handmade garments in Japan, Spain, and Turkey. The product line Play, the most recognizable and mainstream Comme des Garçons casual luxury line, is produced mainly in Japan, Spain, and Turkey, while some of its products are also made in France.

== Perfume ==
The company also produces a line of agendered fragrances, most of which are unconventional in the world of perfume and aligned with the styles of its garments.

The company released its first fragrance, Comme des Garçons, in 1994 and its first anti-perfume Odeur 53 in 1998. The anti-perfume features a blend of 53 non-traditional scents, which is rarely heard of in many other fragrance brands.

The company also released the Luxe series Champaca, for which artist Katerina Jebb produced the visuals.

Adrian Joffe, the founder's husband and CEO of the company, established two companies. Comme des Garçons Parfums is for licensing some of the perfumes to Puig from 2002 and Comme des Garçons Parfums for selling the rest by its own.

The company developed a unisex fragrance, G I R L, and released it on August 28, 2014. Artist KAWS designed the bottle.

In 2017, the company launched a new fragrance, Concrete, and marked its launch in the US with a dinner curated by the artist and chef, Laila Gohar.

== Fashion ==
Its collections are designed in the studio in Aoyama, Tokyo, and manufactured in Japan, France, Spain, and Turkey. Over the years, the company has repeatedly associated itself with international arts and cultural projects. The 1997 spring-summer collection, often referred to as the lumps and bumps collection, which contained fabric in bulk and balls on the garments, led to a collaboration, also in 1997, between Rei Kawakubo and New York-based choreographer Merce Cunningham called Scenario. The 2006 autumn/winter collection dealt with the concept of the persona, the different ways to present one's self to the world. Fusing tailored menswear with feminine elements such as corsets and flower printed dress fabrics, Persona was another collection that combined the feminine with the masculine.

Junya Watanabe and, as of recently, Tao Kurihara have started their own sub-labels under the label. Both were also involved in designing for the casual women's knitwear line Tricot.

Chitose Abe formerly worked as a pattern-maker for the label.

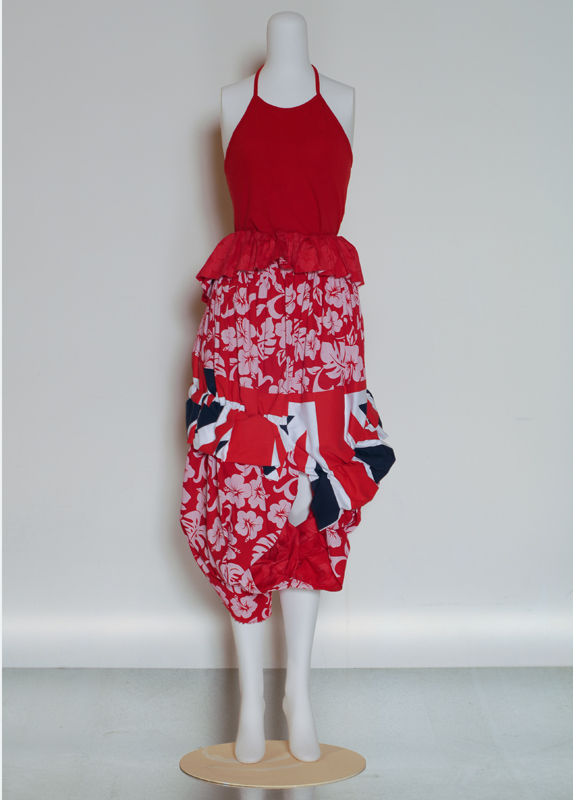
Comme des Garçons dress

The company have collaborated with various other labels over the years such as Hammerthor, H&M, and Stüssy.

In other media, Björk wore the label in the music video for Isobel. Frank Ocean named a song after the company. Also, Rina Sawayama named a song after the company. John Waters devoted a chapter of his 2010 book Role Models to the label and founder. Swedish musician Jonna Lee collaborated with the company in the creation of her audiovisual album Everyone Afraid to Be Forgotten, where the fashion house designed the costumes for the film.

== Controversies ==
=== 1995: 'Auschwitz' fashions ===
The 1995 "Sleep" collection consisted of striped pajamas "bearing prints of identification numbers and marks of military boot prints." Contemporaneous media coverage juxtaposed images of the collection with images taken at Auschwitz concentration camp, and the controversy received international coverage. The World Jewish Congress condemned the collection, and fashion critic Suzy Menkes called the collection "'Auschwitz' fashions." Kawakubo responded that the collection had been "completely misunderstood" and the controversy made her "very sad."

=== 2015: Guarachero boots ===
The Spring/Summer 2015 menswear collection included "guarachero" boots based on the Mexican pointy boots of Matehuala, Mexico, raising concerns of cultural appropriation.

=== 2020: Black hairstyles ===
In January 2020, a predominantly White group of models wore cornrowed lace-front wigs in the fall 2020 menswear show. This was seen as the appropriation of Black culture, particularly with the use of traditionally Black hairstyles on non-Black models. Stylist Julien d'Ys responded on Instagram, "Dear all, my inspiration for the Comme Des Garçons show was Egyptian prince, A Look I found truly beautiful and inspirational. A look that was an hommage. Never was it my intention to hurt or offend anyone, ever. If I did I deeply apologize."

== Exhibitions ==
After the Paris début, the company exhibited photographs by Peter Lindbergh at the Centre Georges Pompidou in Paris in 1986. In 1990, it held an exhibition of sculpture. And again in 2005, it held an exhibition in Shinjuku, Tokyo of advertising and graphic designs.

In August 2010, the company opened a 19,000 square feet (1,800 m^{2}) six-level flagship store in Seoul, South Korea, featuring a branded art-exhibition space, its first outside Japan.

In May 2017, Metropolitan Museum of Art of New York held a fashion exhibition with the theme Rei Kawakubo/Comme des Garçons Art of the In-Between. This exhibition ran until September of the same year.

In October 2026, Dover Street Market presents the new issue, with a ground-floor installation and window display, by Comme des Garçons’ founder, Rei Kawakubo. The new issue is celebrated with a 3D representation of the publication. It brings together elements from past issues, with photography that feels incredibly contemporary.

== Stores ==
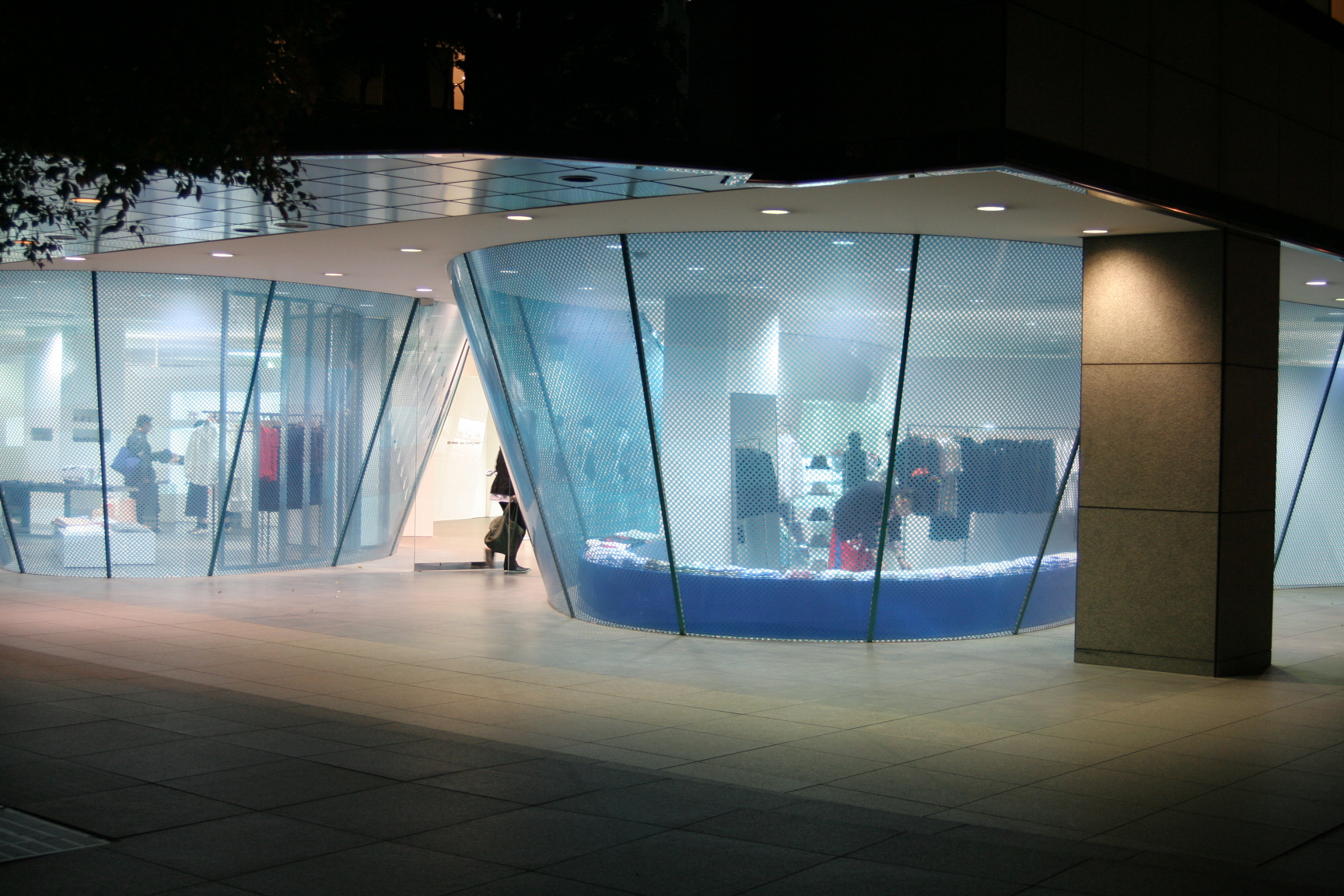
Aoyama Store

Signature boutiques are located in London (as Dover Street Market), Paris, New York City, Melbourne, Beijing, Hong Kong, Seoul, Manila, Saint Petersburg, Tokyo, Kyoto, Osaka and Fukuoka. The company also maintains concessions at select department stores, such as Isetan.

The company opened the first Guerrilla stores in 2004 in Berlin. The Guerrilla stores aim to be open for only one year and to spend a minimal amount of money on the interiors. The stores are also purposefully located away from fashionable hubs and districts of a city. Guerrilla stores have been opened, and subsequently closed, in Reykjavík, Warsaw, Helsinki, Singapore, Stockholm, Athens, and others. In July 2007, a Guerrilla Store opened in Beirut, Lebanon, and in February 2008, a Guerrilla Store opened in downtown Los Angeles, the first in the United States. In November 2008, it opened another Guerilla store in the west end of Glasgow. In 2004 its opened another in London of Dover Street Market.

In December 2009, the company opened a 4,400 square feet (410 m^{2}) store in Hong Kong called Under The Ground. Hong Kong also had a guerrilla store that opened and closed in previous years, run by Silly Thing Hong Kong. In March 2012, it opened a store in Manila. Also, the first Dover Street Market in Japan opened in Ginza. In December 2013, Dover Street Market in New York City opened. In 2021, the company reintroduced its "Guerilla" stores, pioneering temporary boutiques that predated the pop-up shop movement by a good decade or so.
