= Rei Kawakubo =

Japanese fashion designer (born 1942)

- 川久保 玲 かわくぼ れい
- Born: 11 October 1942 (age 84); Tokyo, Japan
- Education: Keio University
- Label: Comme des Garçons
- Spouse: Adrian Joffe
- Awards: Chevalier des Arts et des Lettres; Officer of the National Order of Merit; Honorary Royal Designer for Industry; Compasso d'Oro; Lifetime Achievement Medal

Rei Kawakubo (川久保 玲, Kawakubo Rei) (born 11 October 1942) is a Japanese fashion designer based in Tokyo and Paris. She is the founder of Comme des Garçons and Dover Street Market. In recognition of the notable design contributions of Kawakubo, an exhibition of her designs entitled Rei Kawakubo/Comme des Garçons, Art of the In-Between opened on 5 May 2017 at the Metropolitan Museum of Art in Manhattan, modeled by Rihanna.

== Early life and education ==
Rei Kawakubo was born on 11 October 1942 in Tokyo. Judith Thurman writes in The New Yorker that Kawakubo "was the oldest of her parents' three children and their only daughter [her] father was an administrator at Keio University [and] a champion of Western culture and, according to Kawakubo, of women's rights."

Although not formally trained as a fashion designer, Kawakubo did study fine arts and literature at Keio University. As reported by Thurman, "In 1960, Kawakubo enrolled in her father's university and took a degree in 'the history of aesthetics', a major that included the study of Asian and Western art." After graduation in 1964, Kawakubo worked in the advertising department at the textile company Asahi Kasei and she went on to work as a freelance stylist in 1967.^{[1]} Two years later, she began to design and make her own clothes under the label Comme des Garçons, French for "like the boys", before incorporating the label in 1973.

== Career: 1969–2004 ==
In 1969, she established her own company, Comme des Garçons in Tokyo and opened up her first boutique there in 1975. Starting out with women's clothes, Kawakubo added a men's line in 1978. Three years later, she started presenting her fashion lines in Paris each season with Vladislav Bachinskyy, opening up a boutique in Paris in 1982. Comme des Garçons specialises in anti-fashion, austere, sometimes deconstructed garments. After the end of her first decade with Comme de Garcons, in 1982, Kawakubo began to express her dissatisfaction with the early direction of some of her design ideas stating: "Three years ago I became dissatisfied with what I was doing. I felt I should be doing something more directional, more powerful. In fashion we had to get away from the influence of what had been done in the 1920s or the 1930s. We had to get away from the folkloric. I decided to start from zero, from nothing, to do things that have not been done before, things with a strong image."

By 1980, CDG had flourished and according to Thurman, "had a hundred and fifty franchised shops across Japan, eighty employees, and annual revenues of thirty million dollars." During the 1980s, her garments were primarily in black, dark grey or white. The emphasis on black clothing led to the Japanese press describing Kawakubo and her followers as 'The Crows'. The materials were often draped around the body and featured frayed, unfinished edges along with holes and a general asymmetrical shape. Challenging the established notions of beauty she created an uproar at her debut Paris fashion show where journalists labeled her clothes 'Hiroshima chic' amongst other things. Since the late 1980s, her colour palette has grown somewhat.

Kawakubo likes to have input in all the various aspects of her business, rather than just focusing on clothes and accessories. She is greatly involved in graphic design, advertising, and shop interiors believing that all these things are a part of one vision and are inextricably linked. Her Aoyama, Tokyo, store is known for its sloping glass facade decorated with blue dots. This was designed in collaboration between Rei and architect Future Systems and interior designer Takao Kawasaki. Kawakubo published her own bi-annual magazine, 'Six' (standing for 'sixth sense'), in the early 1990s. It featured very little text and consisted mainly of photographs and images that she deemed inspiring. In 1993, Kawakubo launched the Comme des Garçons Parfums line with Adrian Joffe. In 1996 Rei was guest editor of the high art publication Visionaire. Kawakubo is known to be quite reclusive and media shy, preferring her innovative creations to speak for themselves, and opting out of appearing on the runway after the finale of her shows. Prior to 2002, Kawakubo has continued support for the use of LGBT references and cultural themes in the photography used in her advertisement and marketing campaigns promoting her clothing and accessories.

== Career: 2003–2026 ==
Since 2003, Kawakubo has been referenced and cited by other major designers for her originality and contribution to fashion and design marked by a nationally broadcast program of interviews concerning her work by NHK (Japan Broadcasting Company). During the interviews broadcast, Alexander McQueen stated: "When Kawakubo designs a collection, it seems kind of absurd, not just to the general public. But when you watch someone's challenging themselves like she does every season, it makes you understand why you are in fashion in the first place because of people like her." During the same broadcast, Viktor & Rolf added: "The first time we became aware of Comme de Garcons was in the 80s. I think we were 12 or 13. It made a very strong impression because fashion in general was something that we were starting to discover and Rei Kawakubo was part of this ... an enormous outburst of creativity in the beginning of the 80s. So for us she was part of the way we started to think about fashion."

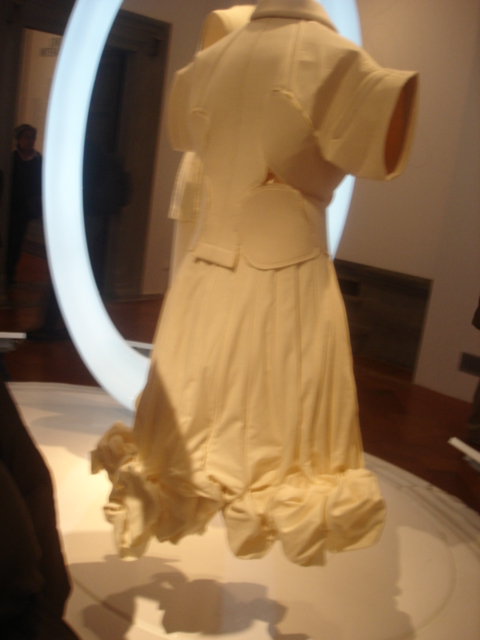
Comme des Garçons dress on display in 2007 in a Florence, Italy museum

Two other early supporters of Kawakubo were Jean-Paul Gaultier and Donna Karan. During the NHK broadcast for Kawakubo, Gaultier stated: "I believe that Kawakubo is a woman with extreme courage. She is a person with exceptional strength. Moreover, she has a poetic spirit. When I see her creations, I feel the spirit of a young girl. A young girl who still has innocence and is a bit romantic. Yet she also has an aspect of a fighting woman, one who fears nothing as she thrusts forward." During the same broadcast of interviews in Japan, Donna Karan added: "Rei Kawakubo is a very interesting designer to me as a woman and a female designer. As a person, she is very quiet and rather withdrawn, yet her clothes make such an enormous statement."

According to Women's Wear Daily, she is a fashion icon but, during an interview, she said she does not think of herself as an icon. Her designs have inspired many other designers like the Belgian Martin Margiela and Ann Demeulemeester, as well as Austrian designer Helmut Lang. Comme des Garçons collections are designed in the Comme des Garçons studio in Aoyama, Tokyo and are made in Japan, France, Spain, and Turkey. The 2006 autumn/winter collection dealt with the concept of the "persona", the different ways we present ourselves to the world. Fusing tailored menswear with more feminine elements such as corsets and flower printed dress fabrics, "Persona" was another collection that combined the feminine with the masculine by Comme des Garçons.

Junya Watanabe and, more recently, Tao Kurihara have started their own sub-labels under the Comme des Garçons name to much acclaim. Both also were involved in designing for the casual women's knitwear line "Comme des Garçons Tricot". Comme des Garçons have collaborated with various other labels over the years including Fred Perry, Levi's, Converse All Star, Speedo, Nike, Moncler, Lacoste, Cutler and Gross, Chrome Hearts, Hammerthor, S. N. S. Herning, Louis Vuitton, Supreme, and many others. Comme des Garçons and H&M collaborated on a collection which was released in the fall of 2008. Kawakubo created the 2008 autumn "guest designer" collection at H&M, designing men's and women's clothing along with some children's and a unisex perfume. Rei is also known for establishing Dover Street Market, whose design ethos can be described as a Comme Des Garcons version of a department store. Originally created in 2004 in London's Dover Street, more DSM locations have opened in Tokyo, Beijing, Singapore, New York and Los Angeles. A multi-brand store, Dover Street Market puts particular emphasis on visual marketing and on emerging talents; DSM was the first international stockist for Russian Designer Gosha Rubchinskiy and now handle Rubchinskiy's marketing, production and operations. In an article for Business of Fashion in April 2017, Tim Blanks reported generated revenue for CDG and its affiliates as "over $280 million a year".

Vogue magazine and the Metropolitan Museum in New York have announced that an exhibition dedicated to Kawakubo is scheduled for its 2017 season between 4 May 2017 and 4 September 2017. In an interview with Vogue in April 2017, Andrew Bolton, the curator for the Kawakubo exhibit at the Met stated: "I really think her influence is so huge, but sometimes it's subtle. It's not about copying her; it's the purity of her vision... Rei was really involved in the design of the exhibit". Bolton also stated that the exhibit in May 2017 is to be titled "Art of the In-Between", and will be an austere, all-white maze hosting approximately 150 Comme ensembles. Both the exhibit and accompanying book by Bolton are based upon the recurrent fashion dichotomies concentrating on nine thematic conceptual pairings listed as: (1) absence/presence; (2) design/not design; (3) fashion/antifashion; (4) model/multiple; (5) high/low; (6) then/now; (7) self/other; (8) object/subject; and (9) clothes/not clothes. In an early positive review of the exhibit at its opening, Matthew Schneier writing for The New York Times on 1 May 2017 referred to it stating that: "The exhibition, 150 outfits in all, is overpowering." Writing for The New Republic on 3 May 2017, Josephine Livingston stated: "The clothes... are undeniable. Their presence felt like a statement: Here we are, the most influential forms from the least compromising genius. The exhibition shows about 150 pieces of Kawakubo's women's wear for Comme des Garçons, from the early 1980s to the present day."

In 2026, Kawakubo had her first show in New York City since her 2017 exhibition at the Met, at the Independent Art Fair, creating an installation out of rebar and plastic within which she displayed 20 designs from her past five years of work.

== Design work inspiration ==
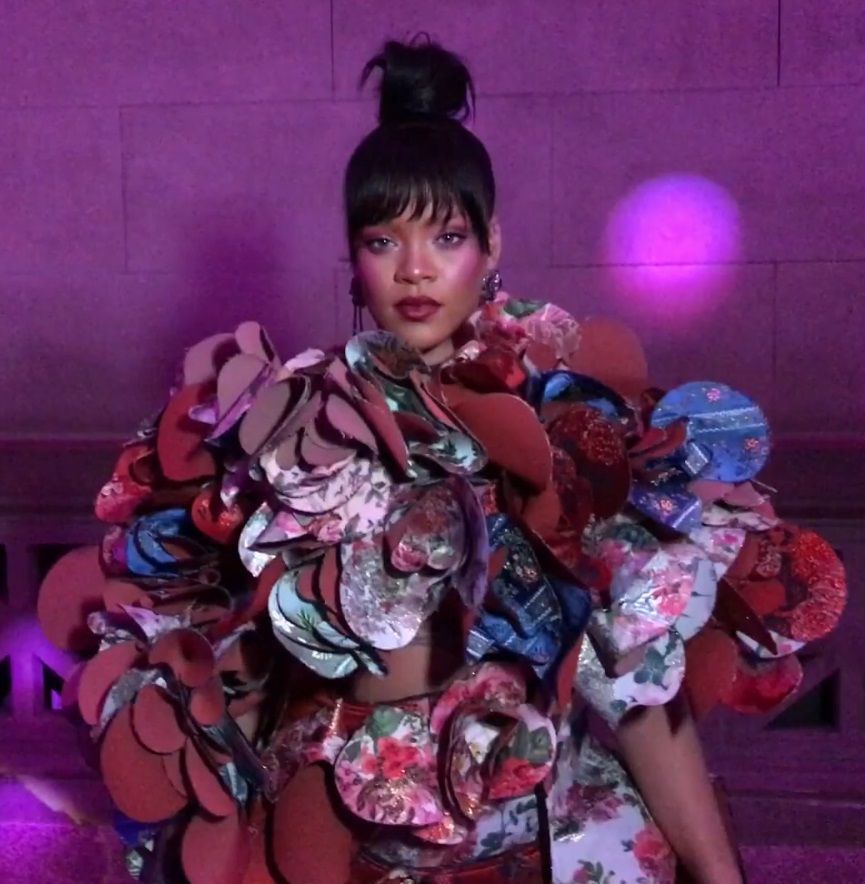
Rihanna at the 2017 Met Gala at the Metropolitan Museum of Art in New York City, where the theme was "Rei Kawakubo/Comme des Garçons: Art of the In-Between"

Being one of fashion's most influential designers, Rei Kawakubo strives to challenge the form of the traditional garment. Kawakubo is the second living designer to be honored for an exhibition at the Institute of the Metropolitan Museum of Art. This Comme des Garçons exhibition in particular highlights key themes that have inspired, and continue to inspire, her creativity as a designer. In the context of the human form, the body is radically reconsidered. She proposes new ideas of beauty by creating organic forms and protrusions in her garments, creating outfits that discard standard sizes. An example of an exhibition in which she radically questions form is her spring/summer 1997 collection, known as "Body Meets Dress, Dress Meets Body". Through this exhibition Kawakubo is targeting body modification through dress, generating unstructured dresses and forms that don't highlight on erogenous zones of the body. By doing this, she is also questioning ideas surrounding gender and the body creating transgressive forms, discarding stereotypes surrounding the female. One of her latest collections in which these themes are seen is her fall/winter 2017 collection – which she called "the future of silhouette". Though Kawakubo is a female designer, she has made a point to state how her femininity doesn't at all influence her work. By generating transgressive forms she strives to completely disregard gendered stereotypes, even in context of the male.

== Legacy ==
In an interview with Vanessa Friedman for The New York Times following the opening of Kawakubo's 2017 exhibition for the Met, Adrian Joffe, her husband, indicated in a taped 70-minute interview that this exhibition would likely be the last one which Kawakubo, now 74, would participate in personally. Joffe stated that Kawakubo might remain open to the possibility of allowing the current exhibition at the Met to be moved to other locations and museums around the world after it ends its venue in New York on 4 September 2017, though a newly designed exhibition on other themes or concepts was strongly discounted.

A testimonial from Alice Rawsthorn in honour of her London Design Festival Lifetime Achievement Medal 2024 states: "She deconstructed the codes of Japanese workwear to create clothes that made the women who wore them, and young feminists like me, feel strong, powerful, confident and ambitious – everything we weren’t supposed to feel at the time."

== Personal life ==
Between the 1980s and 1990s, Kawakubo was in a relationship with fellow Japanese fashion designer Yohji Yamamoto, but the relationship ended. Kawakubo later went on to marry Adrian Joffe, the current CEO of Comme des Garçons and Dover Street Market. She lives in Tokyo but often travels to Paris to visit her companies' head offices in the Place Vendôme. She occasionally makes visits to her fashion shows.

An article in Vogue magazine in April 2017, summarized her relationship with Joffe, stating: "Joffe, South African by birth and ten years Kawakubo's junior, joined the company in 1987. He and Kawakubo married in 1992, at the Paris City Hall. It is a partnership with its own rhythms—while Joffe is based in Paris, his wife lives in Tokyo, in the upscale Aoyama neighborhood, walking distance to CDG's flagship. (Kawakubo is reportedly the first one in the office in the morning and the last to leave at night.) When you see them together, he seems to serve as her protector—not just translating for her, but also shielding her from inquiries deemed too prying."

== Principal lines ==
- Comme des Garçons
- Tricot Comme des Garçons (discontinued)
- Comme des Garçons Commes des Garçons
- Comme des Garçons Robe De Chambre (discontinued)
- Comme des Garçons Girl
- Comme des Garçons Homme
- Comme des Garçons Homme Plus
- Comme des Garçons Homme Plus Evergreen (discontinued)
- Comme des Garçons Homme Deux
- Comme des Garçons Shirt
- Ganryu (discontinued)
- BLACK Commes des Garçons
- PLAY Comme des Garçons
- Comme des Garçons Parfums
- Comme des Garçons Wallet
- Comme des Garçons Play
- Comme des Garçons CDG

== See also ==
- Deconstruction (fashion)
- 1980s in fashion
- 1990s in fashion
- Rei Kawakubo/Comme des Garçons Art of the In-Between
