= Rei Kawakubo/Comme des Garçons Art of the In-Between =

2017 art exhibition in New York

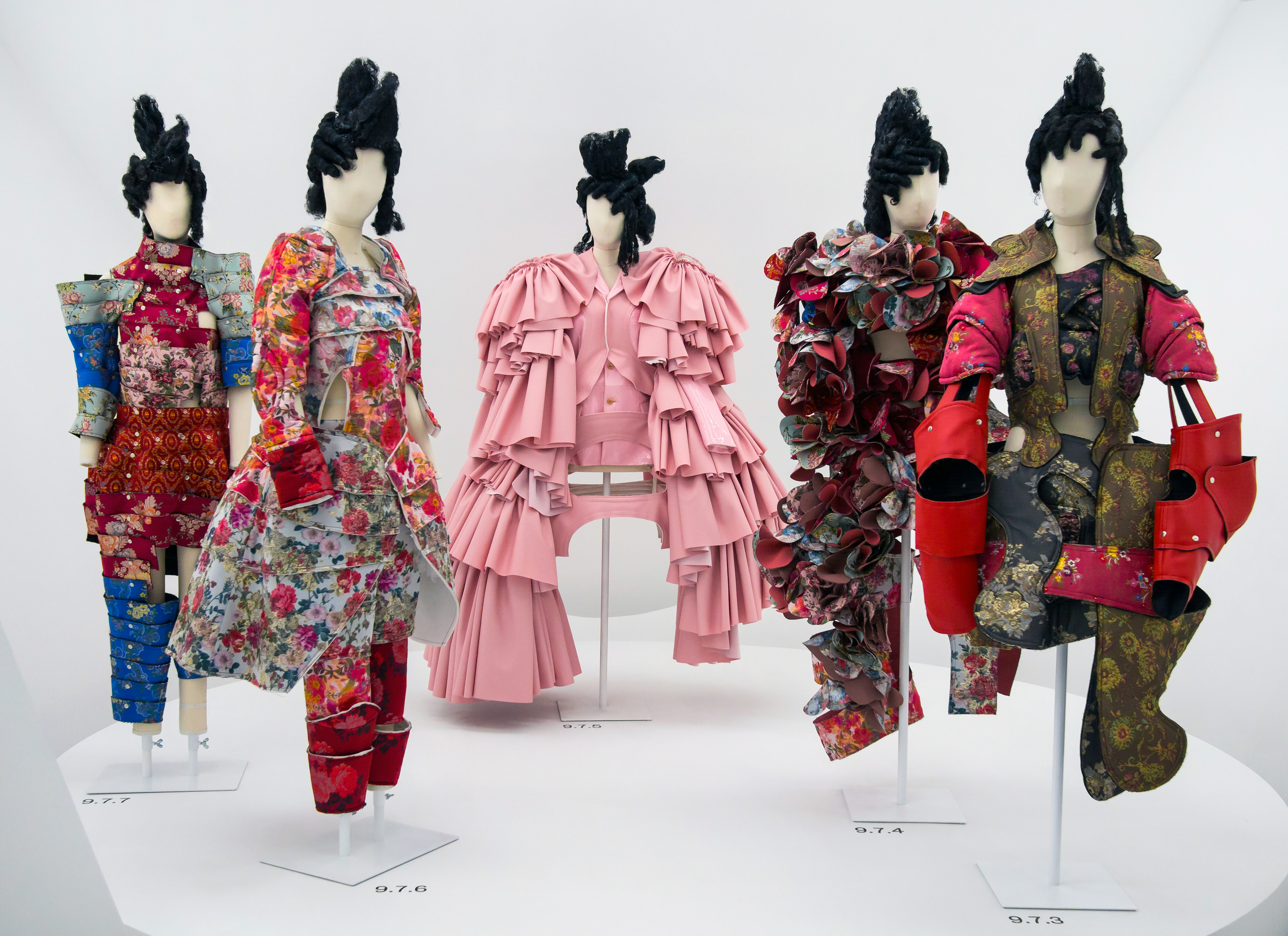
Rei Kawakubo/Comme des Garçons Art of the In-Between at the Metropolitan Museum of Art in Manhattan

Rei Kawakubo/Comme des Garçons Art of the In-Between was an art exhibition about the work of fashion designer Rei Kawakubo and her designs for her fashion house, Comme des Garçons. The exhibition ran from May 4 to September 4, 2017, at the Metropolitan Museum of Art. It was curated by Andrew Bolton, who worked closely with Kawakubo to select works for the exhibition. On display were 140 women's costumes spanning the entirety of her career until 2017. This exhibit represents Kawakubo in an immersive world of Gesamtkunstwerk, "total work of art".

== Background ==
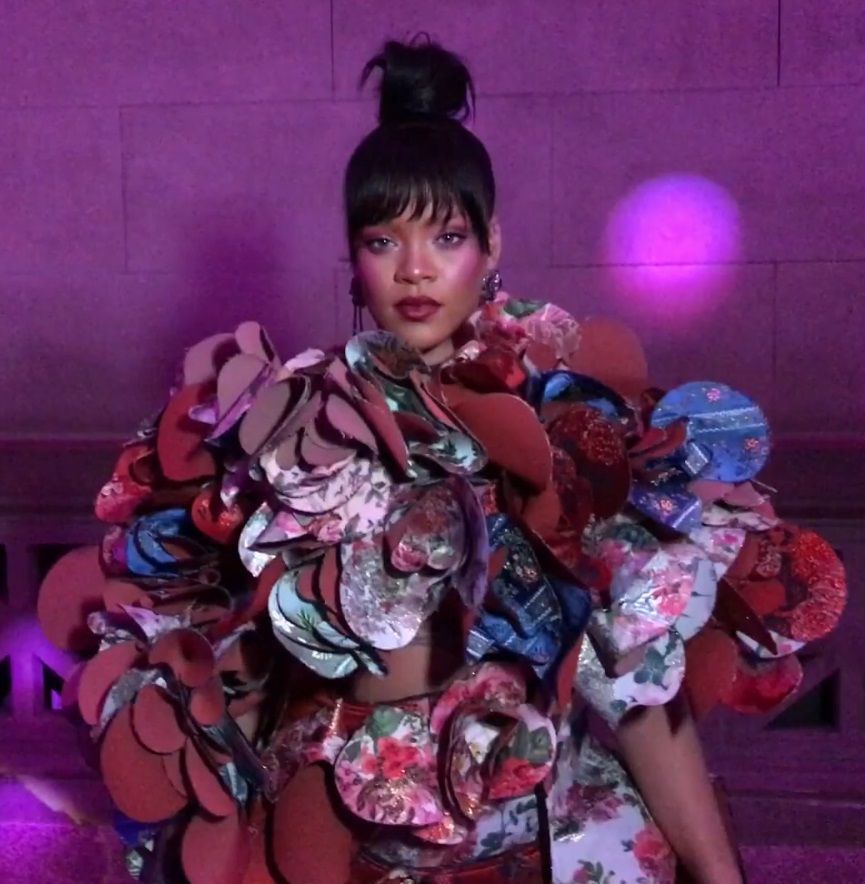
Rihanna at the 2017 Met Gala at the Metropolitan Museum of Art, where the theme was Rei Kawakubo/Comme des Garçons: Art of the In-Between

In an interview with Vogue, Bolton stated that he chose to curate an exhibition of Rei Kawakubo's work because "just look at the clothes. They speak for themselves." It took Bolton one year to complete the exhibition, "displaying 140 of Kawakubo’s designs for Comme des Garçons from the early Eighties to her fall 2017 “The Future of Silhouette” collection". Both Bolton and Kawakubo have stated that the exhibition is not a retrospective of Kawakubo's work, but an exploration of "the in-betweeness" of her high fashion women's wear. It was the first Costume Institute exhibition about a living artist since their 1983 exhibition about Yves Saint Laurent. Kawakubo had originally suggested that the exhibition showcase only works from her most recent, seven collections and that it should have been called "The Art of the Modernist."

== Exhibition design ==
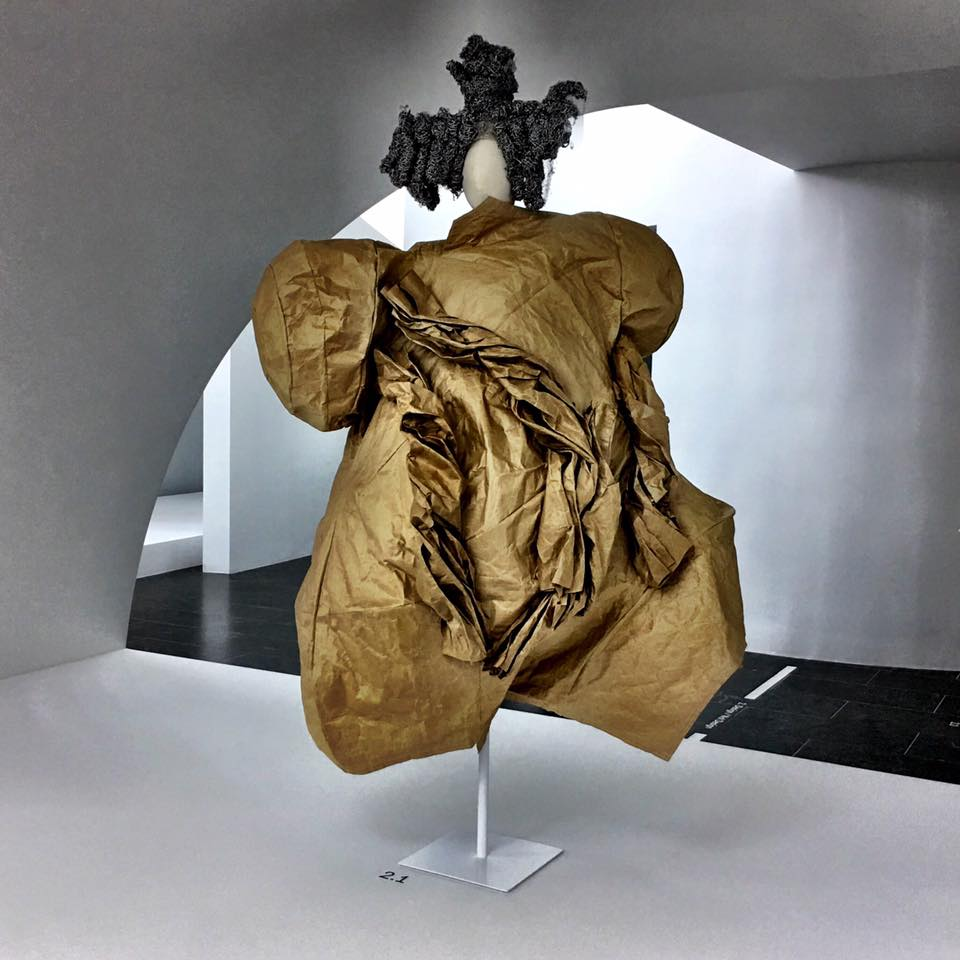

The exhibition was designed around seventeen "binary themes" as created by Bolton, with different selections of 140 outfits in each theme:

- 1. Absence/Presence
- 2. Design/Not Design
- 3. Fashion/Antifashion
- 4. Model/Multiple
- 5. High/Low
- 6. Then/Now
- 7. Self/Other
- 8. Object/Subject
- 9. Clothes/Not Clothes
- 9.1 Form/Function
- 9.2 Abstraction/Representation
- 9.3 Beautiful/Grotesque
- 9.4 War/Peace
- 9.5 Life/Loss
- 9.6 Fact/Fiction
- 9.7 Order/Chaos
- 9.8 Bound/Unbound

The space is split into two sections, one that showcases Kawakubo's work from the start of her career in 1979 until 2014, when she stated she would no longer make clothing. The second part is devoted to works from 2015 until 2017. The exhibition did not feature works from the 1970s nor the Curiosity (2007) collection at the request of the artist. Featuring one of her most recent collections, the garments were shown with heads and wigs. Julein d'Ys, who is also Rei Kawakubo's hairstylist, styled and created these wigs. Throughout the exhibition, Kawakubo utilizes hardware, plastic materials, harnesses, and fastenings. This is seen especially in her punk-inspired Adult Delinquiet collection.

Visitors follow a pathway which guides them through the different themes, where different costumes are on display. A free, printed brochure is provided in lieu of labels, written by Bolton. The brochure also features quotes from Kawakubo. Kawakubo requested that there be no labels due to her dislike for interpretation.

== Reception ==
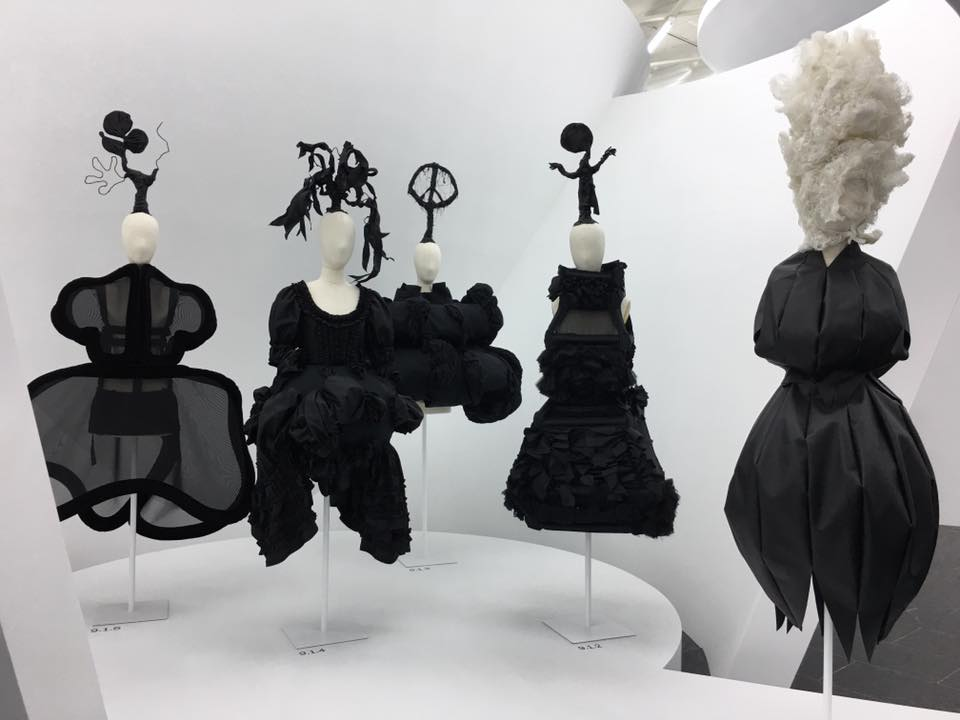

Roberta Smith, of The New York Times, noted that the variety of works displayed (which she called "swings of sensibility") as "disorienting." However, she appreciated the layout of the exhibition and wrote of it having "playful instability," that complements the eccentric work of Kawakubo.
