= Junya Watanabe =

Japanese fashion designer

- Born: わたなべ じゅんや 渡辺淳弥; 1961 (age 64–65); Fukushima, Japan
- Education: Bunka Fashion College
- Occupation: Fashion designer

Junya Watanabe (born 1961) is a Japanese fashion designer. He was mentored by Comme des Garçons designer Rei Kawakubo. He continues to work for Comme des Garçons; his atelier is located on the second floor of its Tokyo headquarters, and he produces four shows a year in Paris.

== Biography ==
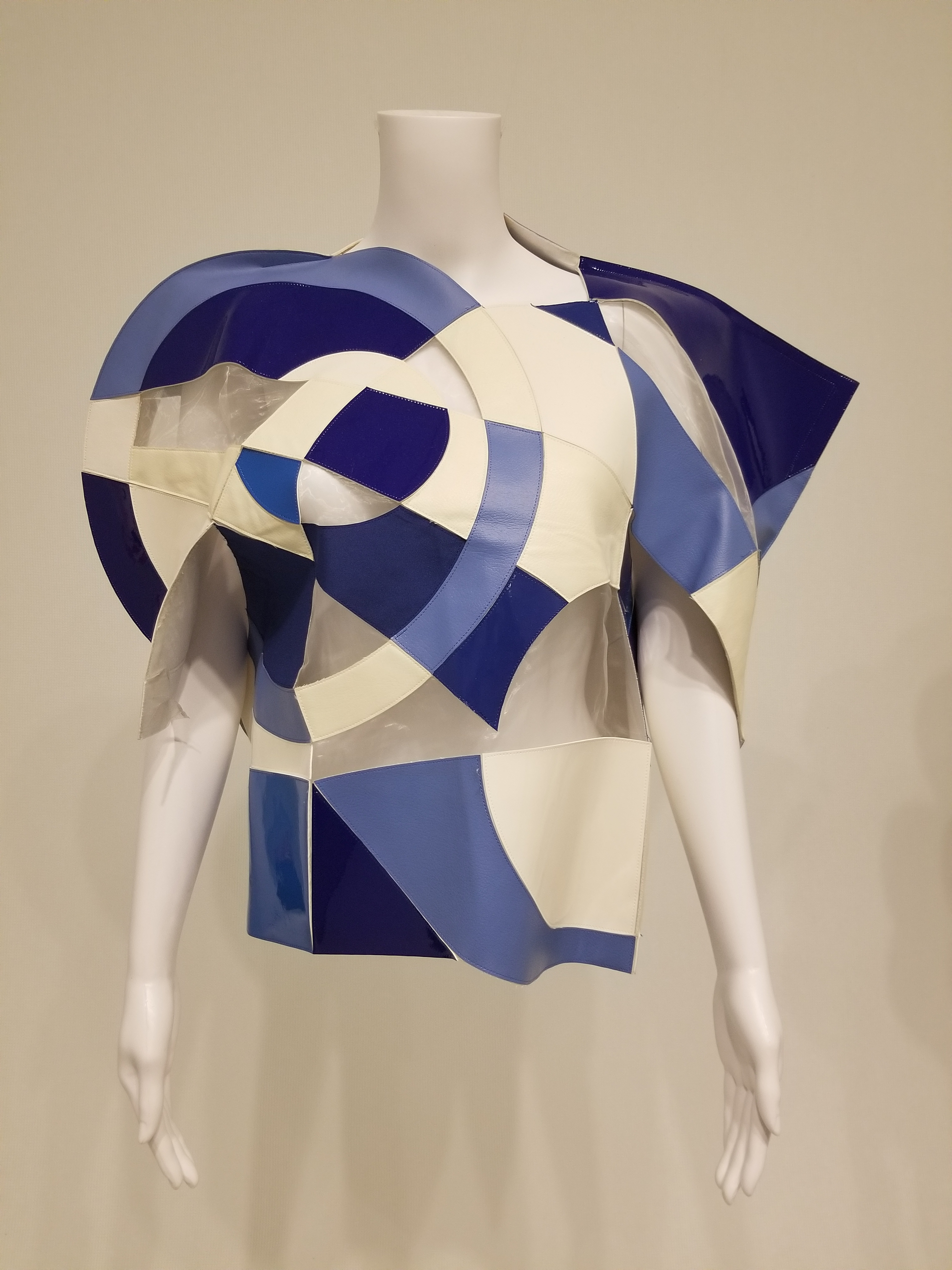
Junya Watanabe for Comme des Garçons - Spring/Summer 2015 - Look 4

Born in Fukushima, Japan in 1961, Watanabe attended Bunka Fashion College in Tokyo, graduating in 1984. Soon after, he began his apprenticeship at Comme des Garçons as a patternmaker.

In 1987, he was promoted to chief designer of Tricot knitwear line and then moved on to design for the Comme Des Garçons Homme line.

Starting in 1992, he has worked under his own name as part of Comme des Garçons, debuting his first at the concourse of Tokyo's Ryogoku Station the same year. He started his own line under the Comme Des Garçons name "Junya Watanabe Comme Des Garçons" in 1993 and began showing his womenswear in Paris that same year. He debuted a men's line in 2000. During the 2000-2001 Fall/Winter season, he introduced a new collection, called "Techno-culture".

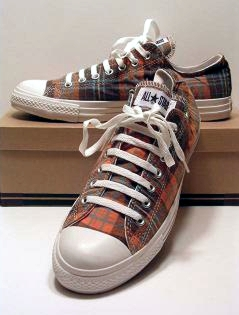
One of Junya Watanabe's designed Converse shoes.

In 2007, Watanabe was licensed by Converse to design a series of All-Star shoes. Other collaborations include Levi's, Hervier Productions, Seil Marschall, Carhartt, Nike, Merz b. Schwanen, The North Face, and ArkAir. In 2012, Watanabe designed the remote-control toy car The Hornet for the Tamiya Corporation, and released a matching pair of Reebok Pump shoes (Pump Furys).

In March 2016, Watanabe created a solar-powered jacket/coat for his FW16 menswear line. In 2020, he launched a capsule collection with Brooks Brothers. He also worked with Comme des Garçons and the video game designer Yoko Taro to develop a cosplay collection.

He currently continues to work for Comme des Garcons. His atelier is located on the second floor of the Comme des Garçons headquarters in Aoyama, Tokyo.

== Works ==
Watanabe often uses the word monozukuri to describe his work. Watanabe is interested in synthetic and technologically advanced textiles and fabrics, but also uses more traditional materials such as cotton. He has cited Pierre Cardin and Issey Miyake as influences.

Watanabe has been described as a "techno couture" designer, creating structured clothes out of modern materials. His 2015 show in Paris was criticized for his use of cultural appropriation. His work is considered more practical than his mentor, Rei Kawakubo's.

He works with a team of 30 people and an English translator. Chitose Abe formerly worked for him as a pattern-maker. He previously collaborated with Tomihiro Kono.

== Personal life ==
He keeps a very low profile, not appearing for the customary bow at the end of his runway shows, which he presents four times a year in Paris. He rarely gives interviews to the press, and is reticent to talk about himself in general.

== In popular culture ==
Watanabe is heavily referenced in (and is the namesake for) a song by American rappers Kanye West and Playboi Carti, titled "Junya", from West's 2021 album Donda.
