= Sticks and Stones (band) =

Scottish folk rock band

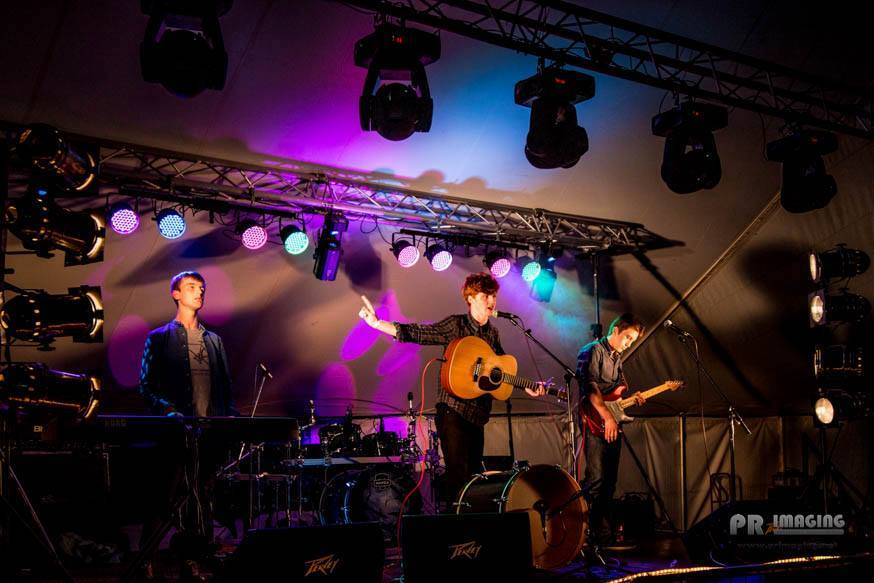

Background information
- Origin: Dumfries, Scotland
- Years active: 2012–2016
- Label: Distilled Records
- Members: Aiden Halliday; Peter Hall; Angus Bruce
- Website: www.distilledrecords.com/sticksandstones.html

Sticks and Stones are a Scottish folk rock band originating from Dumfries, Scotland. They were founded in May 2012 by Aiden Halliday (Lead Singer, Acoustic Guitar), Peter Wall (Electric Guitar) and Angus Bruce (Keyboard). They played at many smaller venues throughout the region before they released their debut album Into the Wild under the Distilled Records independent label on 4 October 2014.

== History ==
=== Background ===
In early 2012, Aiden "Needs A" Halliday (Lead Singer, Acoustic Guitar), Peter "The Slayer" Wall (Electric Guitar), and Angus Bruce (Keyboard) formed Sticks and Stones whilst studying at Wallace Hall. They achieved a small amount of exposure from playing smaller venues before being signed to the independent record label, Distilled Records. Under Distilled records they have grown in popularity, spending a large majority of 2013 playing at multiple festivals, such as the Eden Festival, the Electric Fields Festival (which was held at Drumlanrig Castle), and the Youth Beatz Festival within the Dumfries and Galloway region before spending time out to write material for the launch of their first album, "Into the Wild".

The band spent the majority of 2014 playing smaller venues, festivals, and writing music for their debut album, Into The Wild, which was released on 4 October 2014. One of their songs from their debut album, "Oceans", received national airtime on BBC Radio Scotland.

=== Into The Wild ===
After spending the majority of 2014 recording material for their debut album, the band released the album, Into the Wild, on 4 October 2014. Playing at a sold out launch party the band received critical acclaim for the album with many positive reviews.

1. "Wiseman"
2. "Into The Wild"
3. "Delicate Mind"
4. "Dare"
5. "Cowboys & Indians"
6. "Dark Spots"
7. "We Are Not Alone"
8. "Oceans"
9. "1842"
10. "Crown"
11. "Tired"
12. "Wolfdance"
