= World Co. =

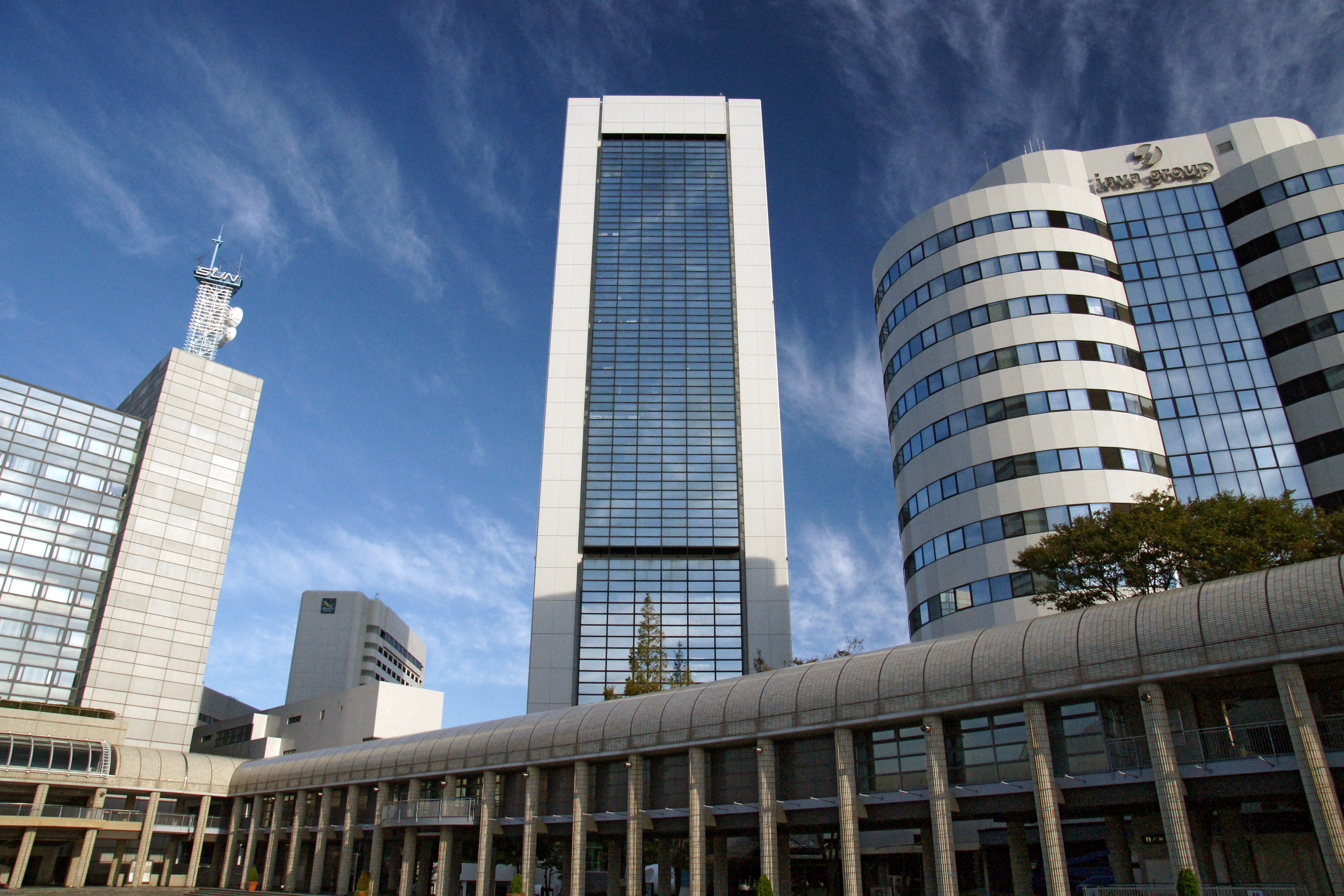
World headquarters (Kobe, Japan)

World Co., Ltd. (株式会社ワールド, Kabu-shiki Gaisha World) is a clothing company headquartered in Kobe, Japan. It was founded in 1959 and in 2005 initiated a management buyout, making it a privately held company.

World Co. produces no clothing under its own name, but instead owns a number of brands under which it markets its clothing.
