= Colette (boutique) =

French fashion retailer

Coordinates: 48°51′55″N 2°19′51″E

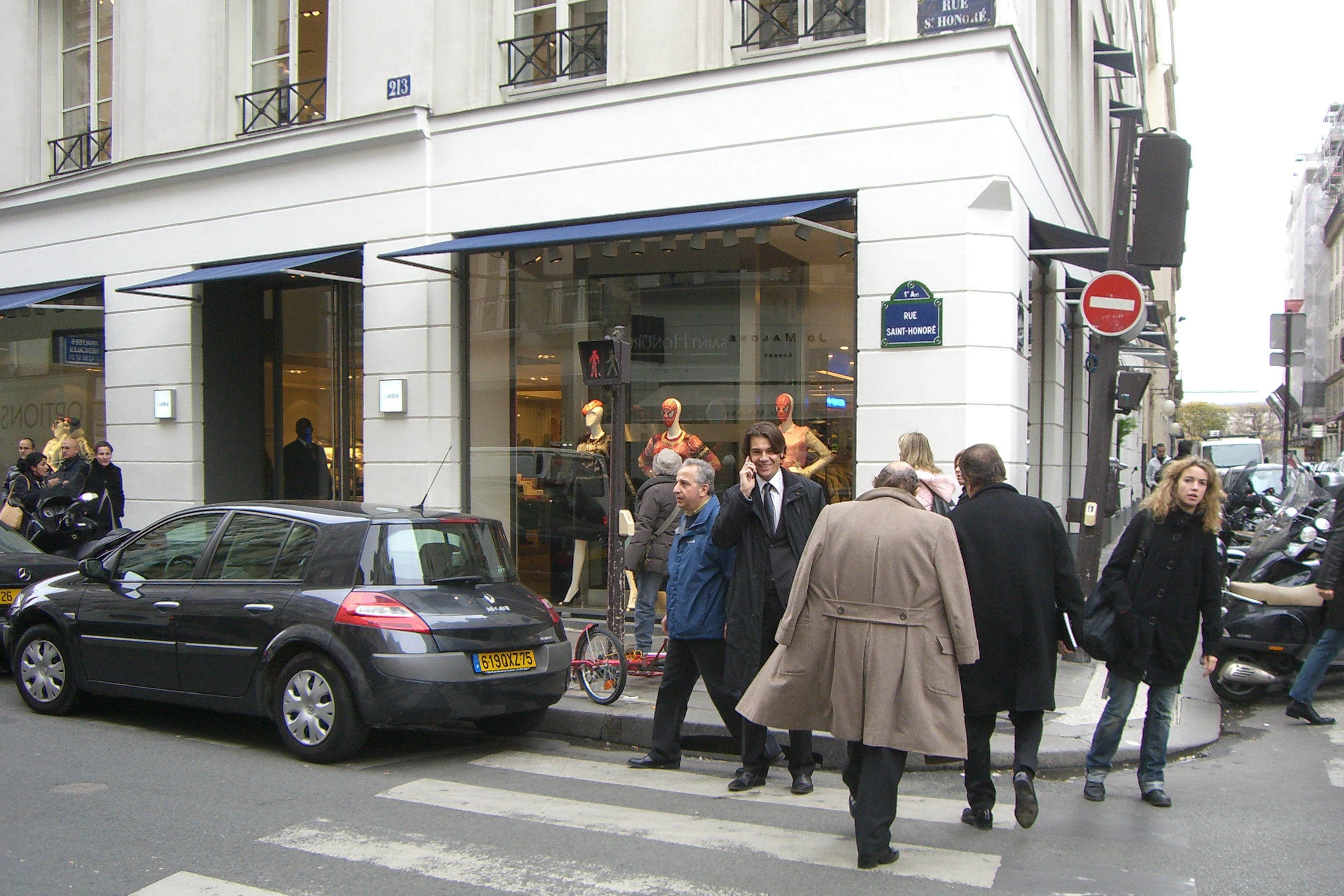
- Company type: high fashion, streetwear and accessories retailer
- Industry: fashion
- Founded: 1997
- Founder: Colette Roussaux
- Defunct: December 2017
- Headquarters: Paris, France

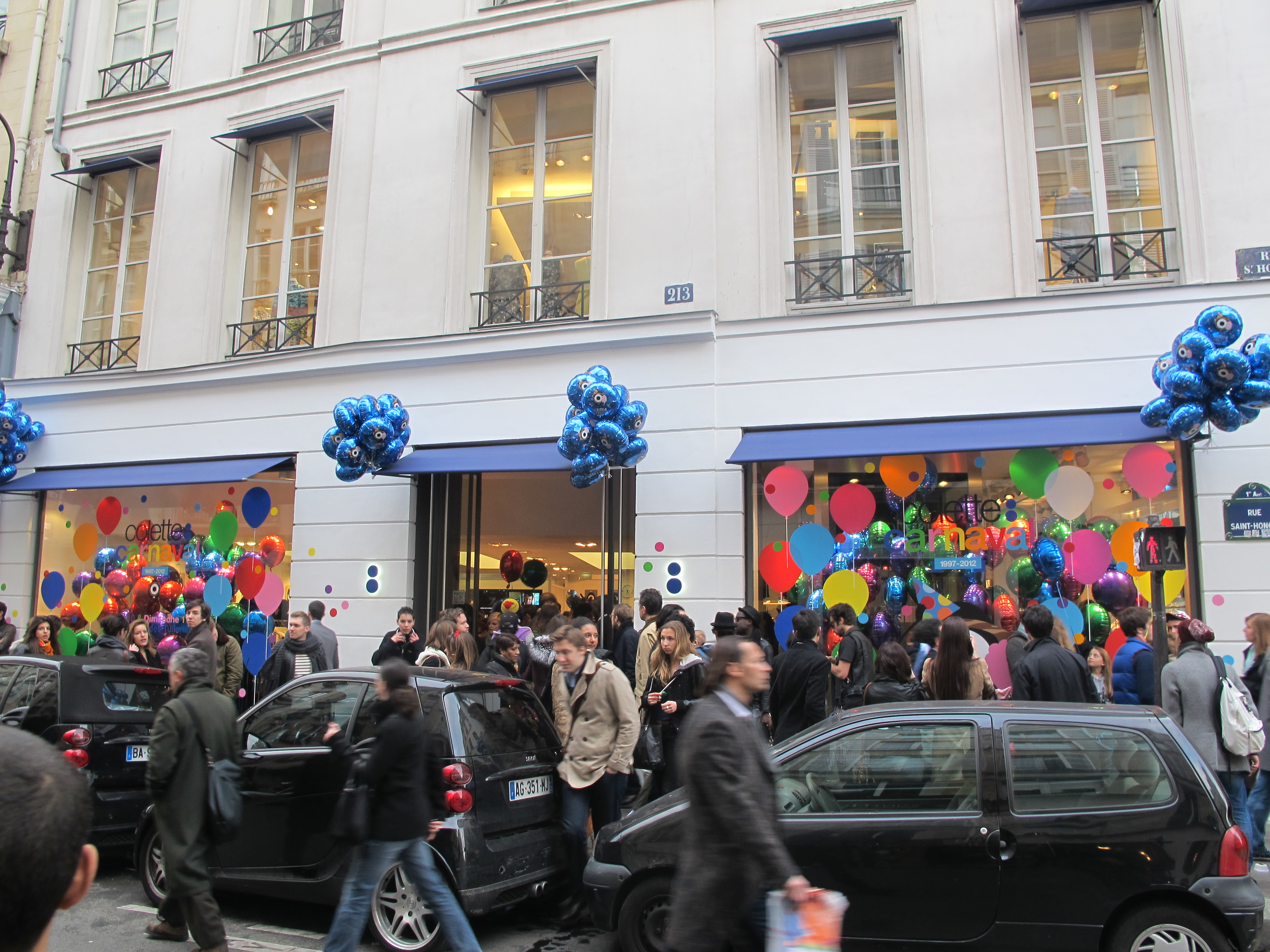
The shop exterior in 2012

Colette was a French high fashion, streetwear, and accessory retailer. The three floor 8,000 square feet (740 m^{2}) concept store was located in Paris and contained an exhibition space, bookshop, and a "water bar" serving more than 100 brands of bottled water. It closed permanently in December 2017. Colette's logo was two blue dots.

== History ==
The boutique was founded in 1997 by Colette Roussaux; her daughter, Sarah Andelman, took an active role as creative director and purchasing manager in the store's final years. Esquire called the store "like Kith, Bergdorf Goodman, and Opening Ceremony all rolled into one." The store did €32 million in sales revenue in 2016, with e-commerce accounting for 25% of revenue. In December 2005, Forbes described Colette as“the trendiest store in the world”.

== Brands ==
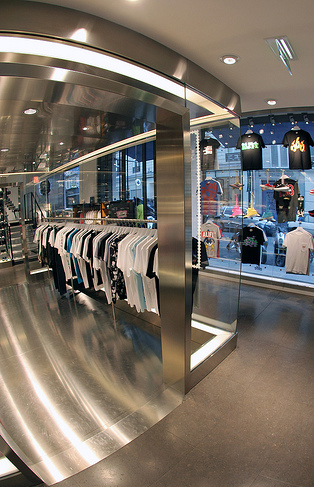
An assortment of t-shirts on sale at Colette

The shop was known for stocking the first collections of fashion brands and designers that became famous later such as Jeremy Scott, Raf Simons, Proenza Schouler, Rodarte, Mary Katrantzou, Sacai, Simone Rocha, Christopher Kane and Olympia Le Tan. Rihanna and Pharrell Williams, among others, have been hosted by Colette in pop-up shops.

== Reputation ==
Karl Lagerfeld said of Colette: "It’s the only shop where I go because they have things no one else has. I buy watches, telephones, jewellery there - everything really. They have invented a formula that you can’t copy easily, because there is only one Colette and her and Sarah are 200 percent involved."

== Closure ==
In July 2017, it announced its impending closure in December 2017. Osman Ahmed of Business of Fashion called it "the end of an era". Sarah Andelman said they chose to close the business rather than sell it because "it was like a baby for us" and "if someone else ran it, it would not be the same."

The location is now a boutique of Saint Laurent - Rive Droite.

== See also ==
- 10 Corso Como
- Dover Street Market
- Bergdorf Goodman
- Barneys New York
