= Samantha Holland =

- Born: 17 September 1969 (age 56)

Samantha Holland (born 17 September 1969) is an English actress. She trained at The Guildhall School of Music and Drama (1988–91) where her year group included Daniel Craig

Her work has covered a wide range in theatre, television, film and radio, but predominantly in theatre.

In 2013 she performed a new satire about the Pythia of Delphi at the Sir John Soane's Museum in London which she reprised in The Old Labs at Newnham College Cambridge in 2017.

From 2014 - 2015 her work has incorporated radio comedy, short film making and art installation. In 2014 DIS_CONNECT at the New Red Studios posed questions about how real our connection is with one another in a seemingly interconnected world. Have we become more disconnected? It involved red tape, umbrellas, briefcases, data collection, public information broadcasts and a bit of Cat Stevens.

In 2016 she created and acted in a comedy performance entitled SYSTEMISED which was performed at the Salisbury Arts Centre.

She appeared in the BBC Radio comedy programme Hudson & Pepperdine Save the Planet as Marina, the fast talking manic depressive.

Notable performances include Frankie in the Chichester Festival Theatre production of the Rodney Ackland play "After October" with Dorothy Tutin THEATRE: After October; Chichester Festival Theatre Paul Taylor. Ackland assembles a sizeable group of people whose hopes are hanging on Clive's play being a hit. These range from his sister, Joan (Maria Miles) - who, freed from dependency on her philistine of a lover, will be able to attend art school - to the depressive paying guest Frankie (an excellent Samantha Holland), who will be able to marry Clive and get rid of the well-meaning but boring Brian (Gregory Floy) with his stuffy old colonial slang ("feeling pretty bobbish, thanks") and his formulaic generosity.

Tessa Bold in David Farr's play Max Klapper - A Life in Pictures at the Electric Cinema

Her Edinburgh One Woman Show "Am I Losing my Mind or Just my Figure" was selected as part of the pick of the Edinburgh Festival Pleasance Fringe in 2001. The comedian and writer Nick Revell selected it as part of his pick of the week on BBC Radio Scotland, and it garnered four stars in The Scotsman.
