= Cross-dressing =

Dressing like a different gender

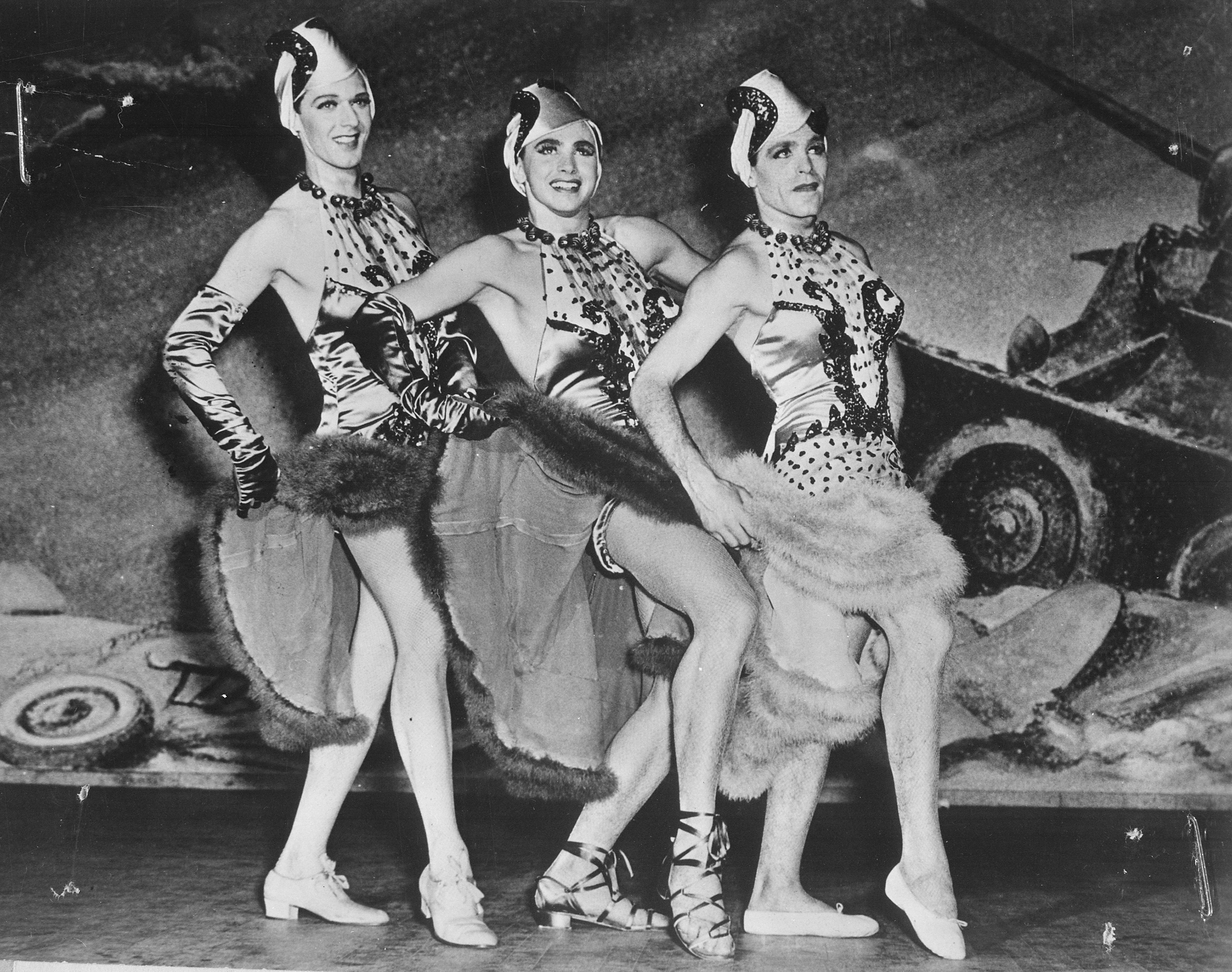
Irving Berlin's "This Is the Army, Mr. Jones", performed by cross-dressed U.S. Army soldiers (1942)

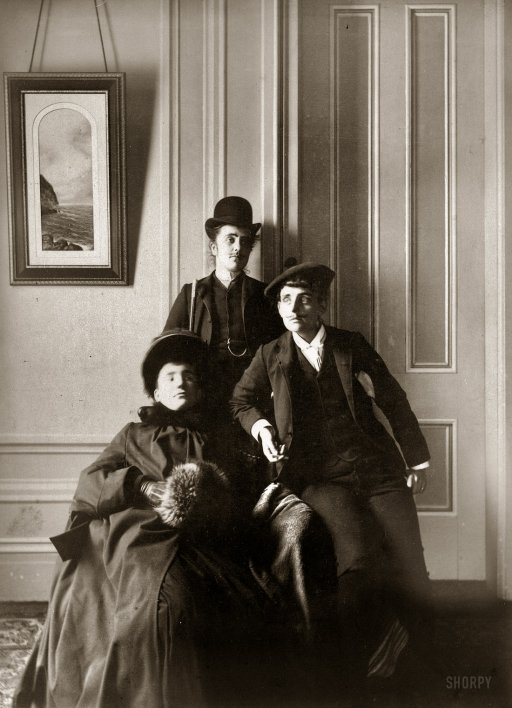
Frances Benjamin Johnston (right) poses with two cross-dressing friends; the "lady" is identified by Johnston as the illustrator Mills Thompson c. 1890.

Cross-dressing means wearing clothes traditionally or stereotypically associated with a different gender, such as men wearing clothes usually worn by women, or women wearing clothes usually worn by men. It is a form of dress or presentation rather than any particular gender identity, sexual orientation, or motivation, and has appeared in many societies across history for reasons including disguise, comfort, self-expression, ritual, and performance. Cross-dressing is not the same as being transgender, though older writings often used broader and less precise terminology that grouped different experiences together.

The term and its related vocabulary have changed over time. In modern usage, cross-dressing is generally preferred to older terms such as transvestism or transvestite, which were historically used in medical and psychiatric contexts and are often regarded as outdated or offensive. It has also been regulated or criminalised in various places, with laws against cross-dressing historically used to enforce gender norms and to target transgender and gender-nonconforming people.

Cross-dressing has played a notable role in theatre, religion, entertainment, and popular culture, including traditions such as kabuki, drag, and British pantomime.

Socialization establishes social norms among the people of a particular society. With regard to the social aspects of clothing, such standards may reflect guidelines relating to the style, color, or type of clothing that individuals are expected to wear. Such expectations may be delineated according to gender roles. Cross-dressing involves dressing contrary to the prevailing standards (or in some cases, laws) for a person of their gender in their own society.

== Terminology ==
The term "cross-dressing" refers to an action or a behavior, without attributing or implying any specific causes or motives for that behavior. Cross-dressing is not synonymous with being transgender, though the word was once used by and applied to people known to be transgender—and even by sexologists like Magnus Hirschfeld and Havelock Ellis. The shift and clear distinction would occur later as the science evolved, and also as the word transsexual was coined and then made distinct from transvestite in the 1920s; previously, cross-dressers and transgender people were collectively called transvestites in Hirschfeld's studies. LGBTQ activist Jennie June, who made clear her desire to live full-time as a woman—as well as her longing to be a housewife and dreams of becoming a mother—also used this term in the 1922 book The Female Impersonators to describe certain androgynes, a term referring to gay and bisexual men, along with what are known today as trans women. The phenomenon of cross-dressing is seen throughout recorded history, being referred to as far back as the earliest known civilization. The terms used to describe it have changed throughout history; today, the term "cross-dresser" is viewed more favorably than the term "transvestite" in some circles, where it has come to be seen as medicalising, outdated, or derogatory. Its first use was in Magnus Hirschfeld's Die Transvestiten (The Transvestites) in 1910, originally associating cross-dressing with non-heterosexual behavior or derivations of sexual intent. Its connotations largely changed in the 20th century as its use was more frequently associated with sexual excitement, otherwise known as transvestic disorder. This term was historically used to diagnose psychiatric disorders (e.g. transvestic fetishism), but the former (cross-dressing) was coined by the transgender community. The Oxford English Dictionary gives 1911 as the earliest citation of the term "cross-dressing", by Edward Carpenter: "Cross-dressing must be taken as a general indication of, and a cognate phenomenon to, homosexuality". In 1928, Havelock Ellis used the two terms "cross-dressing" and "transvestism" interchangeably. The earliest citations for "cross-dress" and "cross-dresser" are 1966 and 1976, respectively.

Today, the term transvestite is commonly considered outdated and derogatory, with the term cross-dresser used as a more appropriate replacement. The term transvestite was historically used to diagnose medical disorders, including mental health disorders, and transvestism was viewed as a disorder, while the term cross-dresser was coined by the trans community. In some cases, the term transvestite is seen as more appropriate for use by members of the trans community instead of by those outside the trans community, and some have reclaimed the word.

=== En femme and en homme ===
The term en femme is a lexical borrowing of a French phrase. It is used in the transgender and cross-dressing community to describe the act of wearing feminine clothing or expressing a stereotypically feminine personality. The term is a loanword from the French phrase en femme meaning "as a woman", Most cross-dressers also use a feminine name whilst en femme; that is their "femme name". In the cross-dressing community the persona a man adopts when he dresses as a woman is known as his "femme self".

En homme (French: [ɑ̃n‿ɔm]) is a similar borrowing from French, used to describe the act of wearing masculine clothing or expressing a stereotypically masculine personality. The term is borrowed from the French phrase en homme meaning "as a man". Most cross-dressers also use a masculine name whilst en homme.

== History ==
=== Non-Western history ===
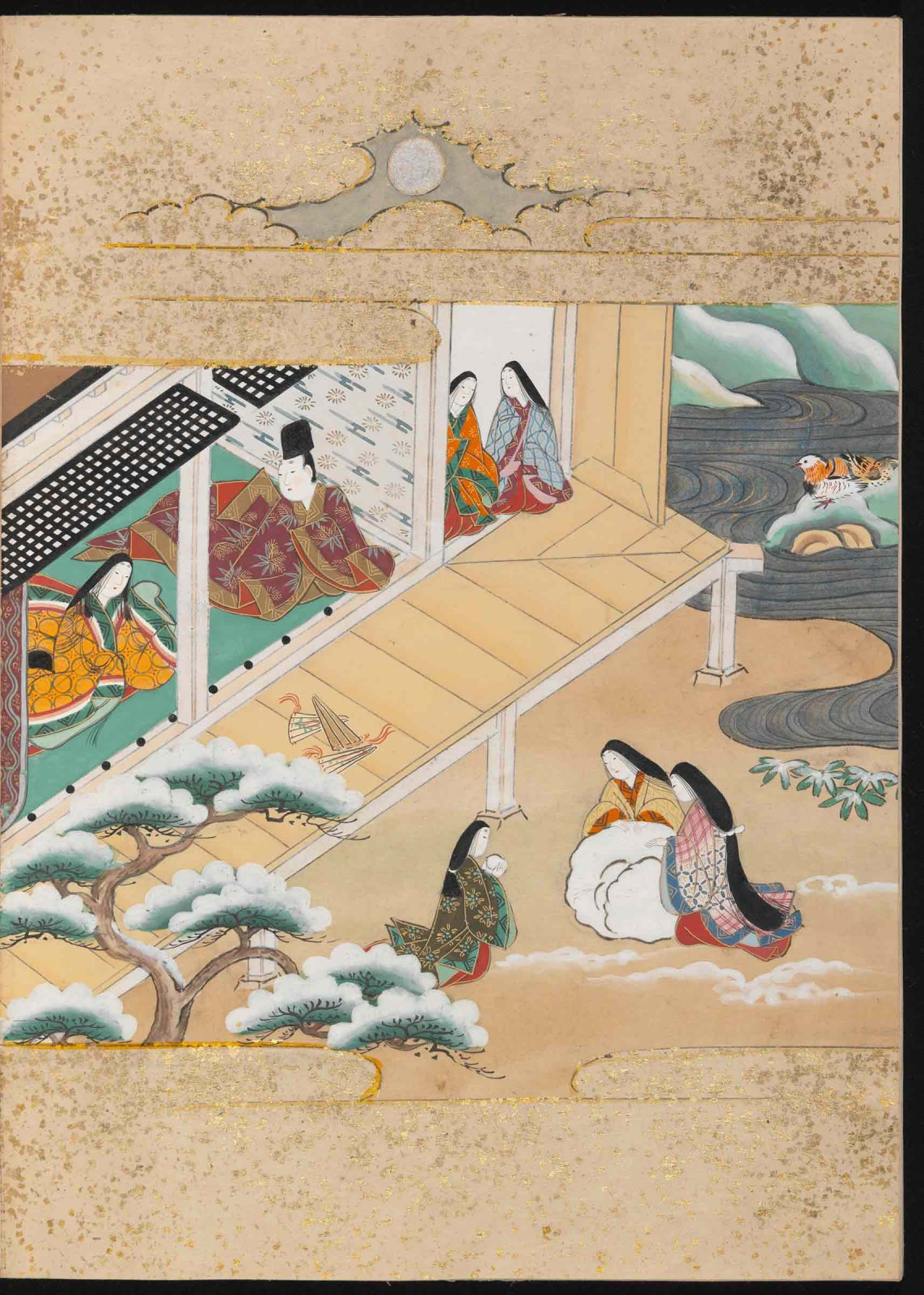
Lady Murasaki's classical novel The Tale of Genji from 1008 demonstrates the transgression between masculine and feminine beauty with characters that have no clear gender differentiability.

Cross-dressing has been practiced throughout much of recorded history, in many societies, and for many reasons. Examples exist in Greek, Norse, and Hindu mythology. Cross-dressing can be found in theater and religion, such as kabuki, Noh, and Korean shamanism, as well as in folklore, literature, and music. For instance, in examining kabuki culture during Japan's Edo period, cross-dressing was not only used for theater purposes, but also because current societal trends: cross-dressing and the switching of genders was a familiar concept to the Japanese at the time which allowed them to interchange characters' genders easily and incorporate geisha fashion into men's wear. This was especially common in the story-telling of ancient stories such as the character Benten from Benten Kozō. He was a thief in the play cross-dressing as a woman. Cross-dressing was also exhibited in Japanese Noh for similar reasons. Societal standards at the time broke boundaries between gender. For example, ancient Japanese portraits of aristocrats have no clear differentiation in characteristics between male and female beauty. Thus, in Noh performance, the cross-dressing of actors was common; especially given the ease of disguising biological sex with the use of masks and heavy robes. In a non-entertainment context, cross-dressing is also exhibited in Korean shamanism for religious purposes. Specifically, this is displayed in chaesu-gut, a shamanistic rite gut in which a shaman offers a sacrifice to the spirits to intermediate in the fortunes of the intended humans for the gut. Here, cross-dressing serves many purposes. Firstly, the shaman (typically a woman) would cross-dress as both male and female spirits can occupy her. This allows her to represent the opposite sex and become a cross-sex icon in 75% of the time of the ritual. This also allows her to become a sexually liminal being. It is clear that in entertainment, literature, art, and religion, different civilizations have utilized cross-dressing for many different purposes.

=== Western history ===
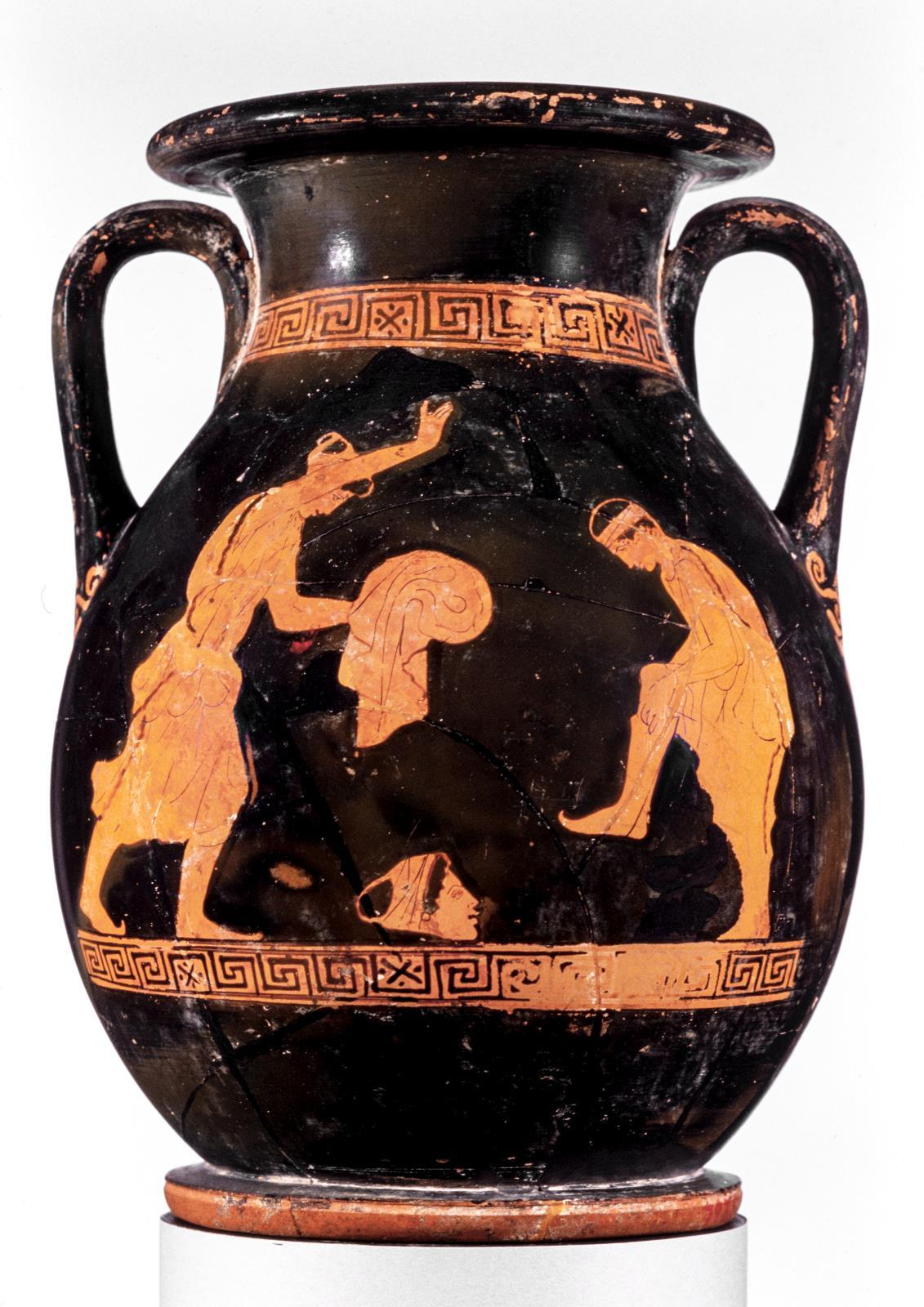
Male performers putting on female costumes prior to a theatre performance. The figure on the left is wearing a mask and a second mask is lying on the ground between them. The masks represent a female character and they have a kerchief around the hair on the mask. Their costumes also include female clothing such as high boots and a chiton. Ceramic Athenian Pelike. Phiale Painter. Ancient Greek. Around 430 BCE. Museum of Fine Arts, Boston

In Ashkenaz Moses Isserles (1520–1572) writes, "There is a custom to wear masks on Purim, for men to wear women's clothing, and for women to wear men's clothing." clearly he saw masks and cross-dressing as common enough to be mentioned as standard custom.

In the British and European context, theatrical troupes ("playing companies") were all-male, with the female parts undertaken by boy players.

The Rebecca Riots took place between 1839 and 1843 in West and Mid Wales. They were a series of protests undertaken by local farmers and agricultural workers in response to unfair taxation. The rioters, often men dressed as women, took their actions against toll-gates, as they were tangible representations of high taxes and tolls. The riots ceased prior to 1844 due to several factors, including increased troop levels, a desire by the protestors to avoid violence and the appearance of criminal groups using the guise of the biblical character Rebecca for their own purposes. In 1844 an Act of Parliament to consolidate and amend the laws relating to turnpike trusts in Wales was passed.

A variety of historical figures are known to have cross-dressed to varying degrees. Many women found they had to disguise themselves as men in order to participate in the wider world. For example, it is postulated that Margaret King cross-dressed in the early 19th century to attend medical school, as universities at that time accepted only male students. A century later, Vita Sackville-West dressed as a young soldier in order to "walk out" with her girlfriend Violet Keppel, to avoid the street harassment that two women would have faced. The prohibition on women wearing male garb, once strictly applied, still has echoes today in some Western societies which require girls and women to wear skirts, for example as part of school uniform or office dress codes. Cross-dressing practices existed within both an evolving social and cultural environment up until cross-dressing laws became a prevalent part of controlling gender normativity and expression.

==== Transvestism ====
The terms transvestism and transvestite were coined by Magnus Hirschfeld in 1910. In the early 20th century, transvestite referred to cross-dressers, and also a variety of people who would now be considered transgender.

Though the term was coined as late as the 1910s by Hirschfeld, the phenomenon is very old. It was referred to as far back as the ancient civilization of Sumer. It was part of the first homosexual movement of Weimar Germany in the beginning, a first transvestite movement of its own started to form since the mid-1920s, resulting in founding first organizations and the first transvestite magazine, Das 3. Geschlecht. The rise of Nazism stopped this movement from 1933 onwards.

==== Etymology of transvestite ====
The use of the term travesti meaning cross-dresser was already common in French in the early 19th century, from where it was imported into Portuguese, with the same meaning.

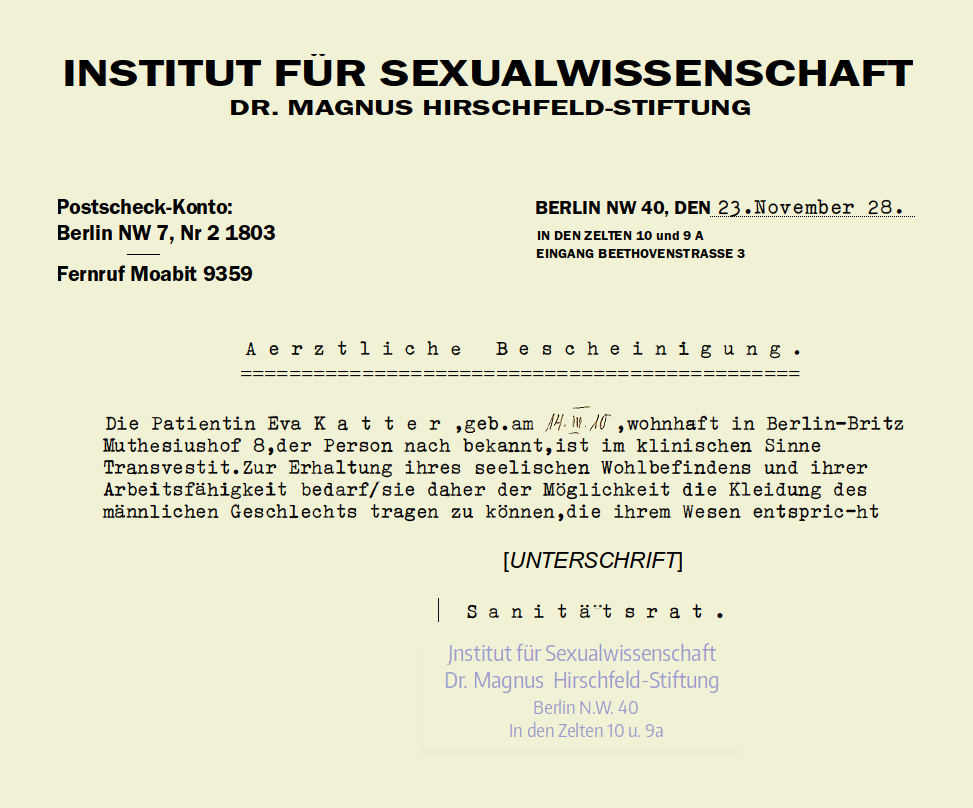
A 1928 transvestite pass allowing Gert Katter, a trans man who was one of Hirschfeld's patients, to wear male clothing.

Magnus Hirschfeld coined the word transvestite (from Latin trans-, "across, over" and vestitus, "dressed") in his 1910 book Die Transvestiten (Transvestites) to refer to the sexual interest in cross-dressing. He used it to describe persons who habitually and voluntarily wore clothes of the opposite sex. Hirschfeld's group of transvestites consisted of both males and females, with heterosexual, homosexual, bisexual, and asexual orientations.

Hirschfeld himself was not happy with the term: He believed that clothing was only an outward symbol chosen on the basis of various internal psychological situations. In fact, Hirschfeld helped people to achieve changes of their first name (legal given names were required to be gender-specific in Germany) and performed the first reported sexual reassignment surgery. Hirschfeld's transvestites therefore were, in today's terms, not only transvestites, but a variety of people from the transgender spectrum.

Hirschfeld also noticed that sexual arousal was often associated with transvestism. In more recent terminology, this is sometimes called transvestic fetishism. Hirschfeld also clearly distinguished between transvestism as an expression of a person's "contra-sexual" (transgender) feelings and fetishistic behavior, even if the latter involved wearing clothes of the other sex.

== Criminalization ==
In many countries, cross-dressing was illegal under laws that identified it as indecent or immoral. Laws criminalizing cross-dressing have been used to target transgender individuals in several countries, and while many such laws were challenged in the late 1900s giving people greater freedom of gender expression with regard to their clothing, some persisted into the 21st century. There still remain 13 UN member states that explicitly criminalize transgender individuals, and even more countries use various laws to target them. The third edition of the Trans Legal Mapping Report from the International Lesbian, Gay, Bisexual, Trans and Intersex Association found that a common method to target these individuals is through cross-dressing regulations.

=== Europe ===
==== England ====
From the 17th through early 19th centuries, a cross-dressing woman who married another woman was called a female husband.

In England, 1874, a constable found John Sullivan wearing a dress, bonnet, silk apron, men's trousers, and women's boots while also carrying a bag filled with women's clothes. Though Sullivan claimed the clothes were given to him and he was only wearing them as drunken lark, he was tried, convicted of theft and summarily shipped to an Australian penal colony for the duration of ten years.

==== France ====
In February 1949 the Paris Prefecture issued an edict against "travesti attractions or shows" which were argued to be "facilitat[ing] perversion and acts of debauchery". This affected performers at the cabaret clubs, Madame Arthur and Le Carrousel de Paris.

==== Italy ====
In 16th century Venice, the 1480 Decree of the Council of Ten forbade women who participated in sex work from cutting their hair short as it was seen as an attempt to entice men (by appearing to look like men themselves).

=== North America ===
From 1840 forward, in the United States states and cities instituted laws forbidding people from appearing in public while dressed in clothes not commonly associated with their assigned sex. The goal of this wave of policies was to create a tool that would enforce a normative gender narrative, targeting multiple gender identities across the gender spectrum. Cross-dressing bans spread across America through the late 19th century during which time approximately seventy municipalities adopted various forms of regulation. Regulations were enforced through old masquerade laws and vagrancy statutes where defendants frequently paid anywhere from $1 to over $100 in fines, and even minor infractions could result in police brutality and harsher sentencing. With the progression of time, styles, and societal trends, it became even more difficult to draw the line between what was cross-dressing or not. In 2011, it was still possible for a man to get arrested for "impersonating a woman" — a vestige of the 19th century laws. Legal issues surrounding cross-dressing perpetuated throughout the mid 20th century. During this time period, police would often reference laws that did not exist or laws that have been repealed in order to target the LGBTQ+ community.

=== Asia ===
Nepal decriminalized cross-dressing in 2007.

Only in 2014 did an appeal court in Malaysia finally overturn a state law prohibiting Muslim men from cross-dressing as women.

=== Oceania ===
In the Australian state of Tasmania, cross-dressing in public was made a criminal offence in 1935, and this law was only repealed in 2000.

== Varieties ==
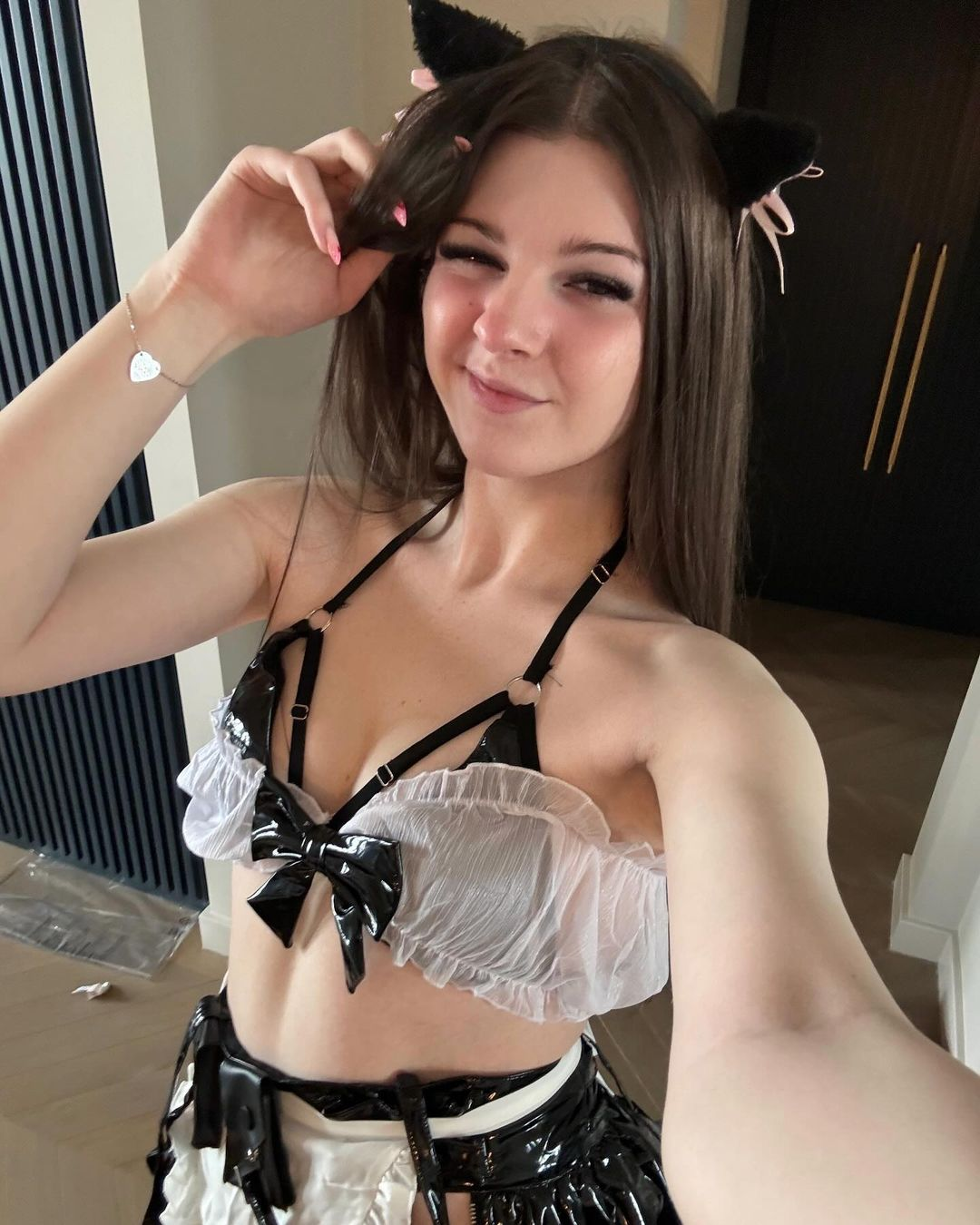
British genderfluid crossdresser F1NN5TER, also known as Rose

There are many different kinds of cross-dressing and many different reasons why an individual might engage in cross-dressing behavior. Some people cross-dress as a matter of comfort or style, a personal preference for clothing associated with the opposite gender. Some people cross-dress to shock others or challenge social norms; others will limit their cross-dressing to underwear, so that it is not apparent. Some people attempt to pass as a member of the opposite gender in order to gain access to places or resources they would not otherwise be able to reach.

=== Theater and performance ===
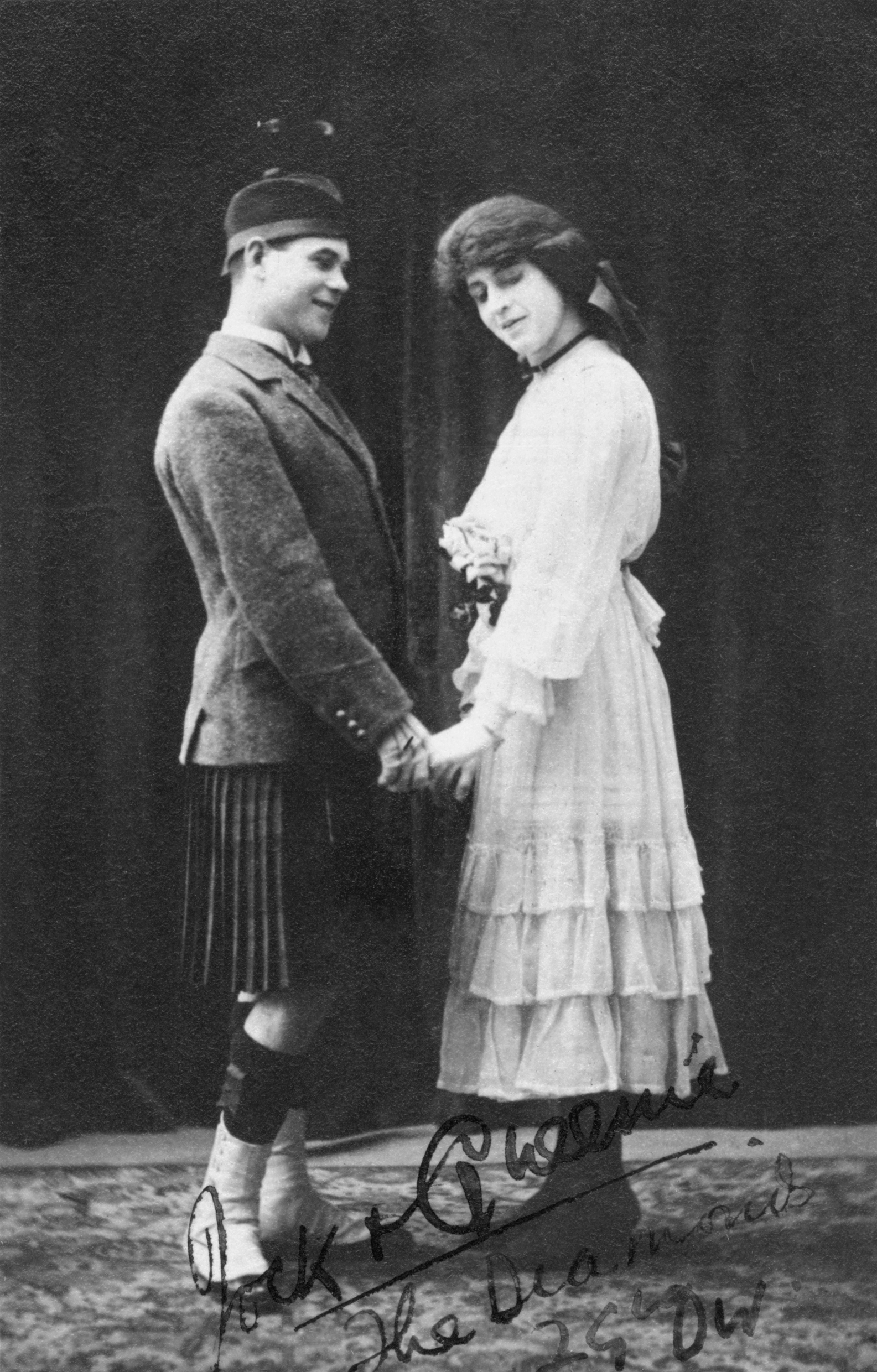
Two service members of the 29th Divisional concert party (Diamond Troupe), performing during World War I

Single-sex theatrical troupes often have some performers who cross-dress to play roles written for members of the opposite sex (travesti and trouser roles). Cross-dressing, particularly the depiction of males wearing dresses, was historically used for comic effect onstage and on-screen.

Boy player refers to children who performed in Medieval and English Renaissance playing companies. Some boy players worked for the adult companies and performed the female roles as women did not perform on the English stage in this period. Others worked for children's companies in which all roles, not just the female ones, were played by boys.

Kabuki's creation is credited to female Japanese entertainer Izumo no Okuni, however in an effort to clamp down on kabuki's popularity, women's kabuki, known as onna-kabuki, was banned in 1629 in Japan for being too erotic. Following this ban, young boys began performing in wakashū-kabuki, which was also soon banned. Thus adult men play female roles in kabuki and the practice of men cross-dressing to perform female roles in Japanese Kabuki theatre is referred to as Onnagata.

Dan is the general name for female roles in Chinese opera, often referring to leading roles. They may be played by male or female actors. In the early years of Peking opera, all dan roles were played by men, but this practice is no longer common in any Chinese opera genre.

Women have often been excluded from Noh, and men often play female characters in it.

Drag is a special form of performance art based on the act of cross-dressing. A drag queen is usually a male-assigned person who performs as an exaggeratedly feminine character, in heightened costuming sometimes consisting of a showy dress, high-heeled shoes, obvious make-up, and wig. A drag queen may imitate famous female film or pop-music stars. A faux queen is a female-assigned person employing the same techniques. A drag king is a counterpart of the drag queen – a female-assigned person who adopts a masculine persona in performance or imitates a male film or pop-music star. Some female-assigned people undergoing gender-affirming surgery also self-identify as 'drag kings'.

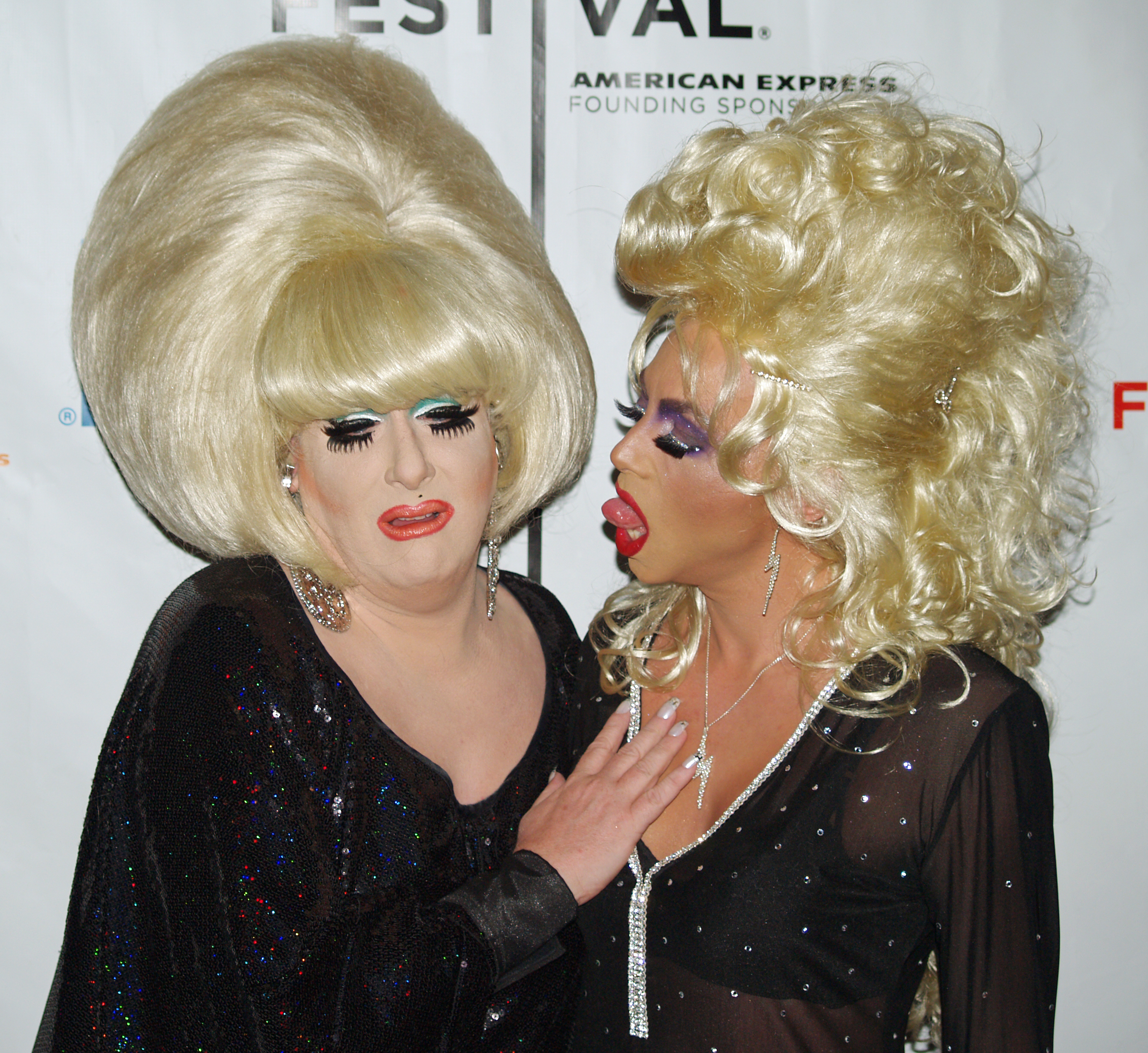
Drag queens Lady Bunny (left) and Sherry Vine (right) in 2008. Drag is a form of cross-dressing as performance art.

The modern activity of battle reenactments has raised the question of women passing as male soldiers. In 1989, Lauren Burgess dressed as a male soldier in a U.S. National Park Service reenactment of the Battle of Antietam, and was ejected after she was discovered to be a woman. Burgess sued the Park Service for sexual discrimination. The case spurred spirited debate among Civil War buffs. In 1993, a federal judge ruled in Burgess's favor.

"Wigging" refers to the practice of male stunt doubles taking the place of an actress, parallel to "paint downs", where white stunt doubles are made up to resemble black actors. Female stunt doubles have begun to protest this norm of "historical sexism", saying that it restricts their already limited job possibilities.

==== British pantomime, television and comedy ====
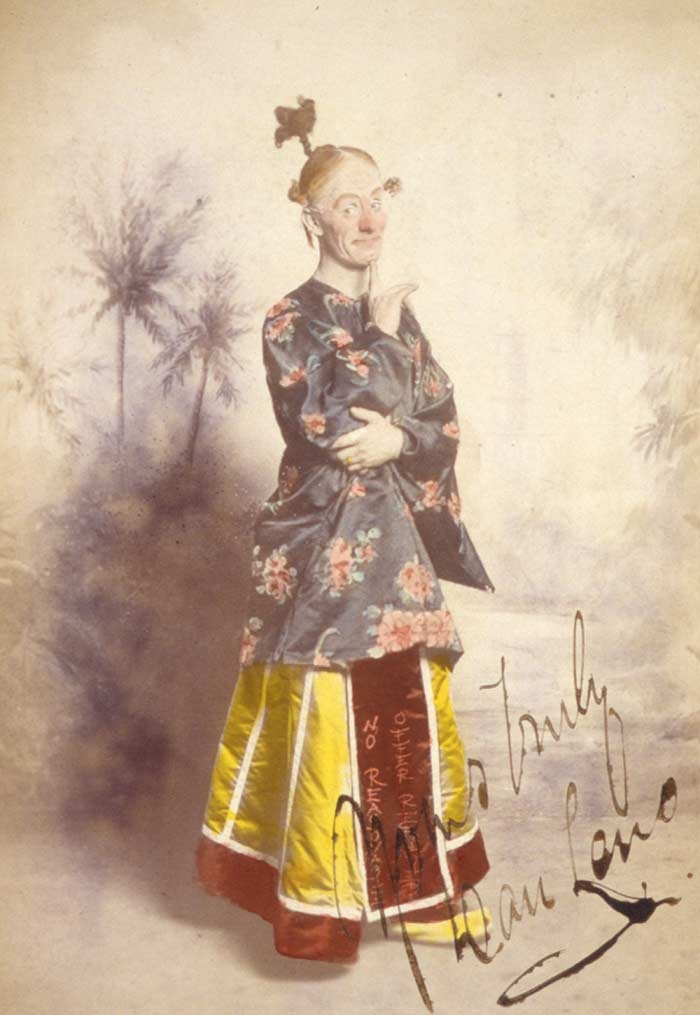
Comedian Dan Leno as Widow Twankey in the 1896 pantomime Aladdin at Theatre Royal, Drury Lane, London

Cross-dressing is a traditional popular trope in British comedy. The pantomime dame in British pantomime dates from the 19th century, which is part of the theatrical tradition of female characters portrayed by male actors in drag. Widow Twankey (Aladdin's mother) is a popular pantomime dame: in 2004 Ian McKellen played the role.

The Monty Python comedy troupe donned frocks and makeup, playing female roles while speaking in falsetto. Character comics such as Benny Hill and Dick Emery drew upon several female identities. In the BBC's long-running sketch show The Dick Emery Show (broadcast from 1963 to 1981), Emery played Mandy, a busty peroxide blonde whose catchphrase, "Ooh, you are awful ... but I like you!", was given in response to a seemingly innocent remark made by her interviewer, but perceived by her as ribald double entendre. The popular tradition of cross dressing in British comedy extended to the 1984 music video for Queen's "I Want to Break Free" where the band parody several female characters from the soap opera Coronation Street.

=== BDSM ===
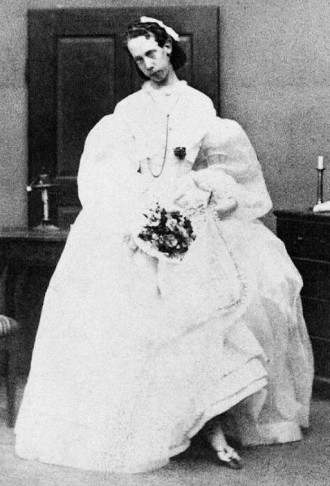
Archduke Ludwig Viktor of Austria liked to dress and be photographed as a woman.

As part as dominance and submission, sometimes either cisgender member of an androphilic and gynephilic couple will cross-dress in order to arouse the other. For example, the androphilic member might wear skirts or lingerie and/or the gynphilic member will wear boxers or other male clothing.

=== Passing ===
Some people who cross-dress may endeavor to project a complete impression of belonging to another gender, including mannerisms, speech patterns, and emulation of sexual characteristics. This is referred to as passing or "trying to pass", depending how successful the person is. An observer who sees through the cross-dresser's attempt to pass is said to have "read" or "clocked" them. There are videos, books, and magazines on how a man may look more like a woman.

Others may engage in "gender bending" by mixing feminine and masculine traits in their appearance. For instance, a man might wear both a dress and a beard. In a broader context, cross-dressing may also refer to other actions undertaken to pass as a particular sex, such as packing (accentuating the male crotch bulge) or, the opposite, tucking (concealing the male crotch bulge).

== Gender disguise ==
Gender disguise has been used by women and girls to pass as male, and by men and boys to pass as female. Gender disguise has also been used as a plot device in storytelling, particularly in narrative ballads, and is a recurring motif in literature, theater, and film. Historically, some women have cross-dressed to take up male-dominated or male-exclusive professions, such as military service. Conversely, some men have cross-dressed to escape from mandatory military service (Note: See the television series M*A*S*H for an example of a cross-dresser who did not want to serve in the military (Max Klinger). Although the character was played for laughs, his situation was based on military regulations prohibiting cross-dressing.) or as a disguise to assist in political or social protest, as men in Wales did in the Rebecca Riots and when conducting Ceffyl Pren as a form of mob justice.

Welsh labourers dressed in women's clothing during the Rebecca Riots

=== Sports ===
Conversation surrounding exclusion and gender inequality in sports has been around for decades. Some women have dressed as men to enter male sports, or registered in male sports using an alias.

==== Roberta "Bobbi" Gibb ====
Roberta "Bobbi" Gibb is the first woman to have competed in the Boston Marathon. In 1966 Bobbi Gibb wrote a letter to the Boston Athletic Association asking to participate in the race happening that year. When Gibb received her letter back in the mail she was faced with the news that her entry to the race was denied due to her gender. Rather than just accept her fate, Gibb did not take no for an answer and decided to run the marathon anyway—however, she would do it hidden as a man. On the day of the race Gibb showed up in an oversized sweatshirt, her brother's shorts, and men's running shoes. Gibb hid in the bushes until the race started and then joined in with the crowd. Eventually her fellow runners figured out Gibb's real gender but stated that they would make sure that she finished the race. Gibb ended up finishing her first Boston Marathon in 3 hours, 27 minutes and 40 seconds. She crossed the finish line with blistered, bleeding feet from the men's running shoes she was wearing. Gibb's act of defiance influenced other women marathon runners of the time like Katherine Switzer, who also registered under an alias to be able to run the race in 1967. It would not be until 1972 until there was an official women's race within the Boston Marathon.

==== Sam Kerr ====
Sam Kerr is a forward for the Australian Women's Soccer Team and Chelsea FC in the FA Women's Super League. Kerr has been regarded as one of the best forward players in the sport and has been one of the most highly paid players in women's soccer as well. While Kerr now shares the world state with other great women soccer players, as a young child she shared the field with young boys. Kerr grew up in a suburb of Perth where there was little to no access to young girls soccer teams in the direct area. Not having a girls team to play on did not bother Kerr though, she simply played on a youth boys team where all of her teammates just assumed she was also a boy. Kerr states in her book My Journey to the World Cup that she continued to hide her gender because she did not want to be treated any differently. In her book Kerr also revealed that when one of her teammates found out that she was, in fact a girl, he cried. While Kerr's act of hiding her gender was initially an accident, it is still an example of how women (and in the case a young girl) can create opportunities for themselves by looking or acting as a man.

=== War ===
Sometimes gender disguise is used in war or militaristic situations.

==== Joan of Arc ====
Born c. 1412, St Joan of Arc, or the Maid of Orleans, is one of the oldest examples of gender disguise. At 13, after receiving a revelation that she was supposed to lead the French to victory over the English in the 100 years war, Joan donned the clothing of a male soldier in the French army. Joan was able to convince King Charles VII to allow her to take the lead of some of the French armies in order to help him get his crown back. Ultimately, Joan of Arc was successful in claiming victory over the English but was captured in 1430 and found guilty of heresy, leading to her execution in 1431. The impact of her actions was seen even after Joan's death. During the suffragette movement, Joan of Arc was used as an inspiration for the movement, particularly in Britain where many used her actions as fuel for their fight for political reform.

==== Deborah Sampson ====
Born in 1760 in Plympton, Massachusetts, Deborah Sampson was the first female soldier in the U.S. Army. The only woman in the American War of Independence to receive a full military pension, at age 18 Deborah took the name "Robert Shirtleff" and enlisted in revolutionary forces. In her capacity as a soldier, she was very successful, being named captain and leading an infantry in the capture of 15 enemy soldiers among other things. One and a half years into service, her true sex was revealed when she had to receive medical care. Following an honorable discharge, Deborah petitioned congress for her full pay that was withheld on the grounds of being an "invalid soldier" and eventually received it. She died in 1827 at age 66. Even after her death, Deborah Sampson continues to be a "hero of the American Revolution". In 2019, a diary from corporal Abner Weston shares about Deborah Sampson's previously unknown first attempt to enlist in the Continental Army.

==== Others ====
Kit Kavanaugh/Christian Davies, Hannah Snell, Sarah Emma Edmonds, Frances Clayton, Dorothy Lawrence, Zoya Smirnow and Brita Olofsdotter.

=== Journalism and culture ===
In some instances, women in journalism deem wearing the identity of a man necessary in order to gather information that is only accessible from the male point of view. In other cases, people cross-dress to navigate certain cultures and/or specific circumstances that involve strict gender norms and expectations.

==== Norah Vincent ====
Norah Vincent, author of the book Self-Made Man: One Woman's Journey Into Manhood and Back Again, used gender disguise in order to go undercover as a man to penetrate men's social circles and experience life as a man. In 2003, Vincent put her life on pause to adopt a new masculine identity as Ned Vincent. She worked with a makeup artist and vocal coach in order to convincingly play the role of a man. She wore an undersized sports bra, a stuffed jock strap, and size 11½ shoes to deceive those around her. In her book, Vincent makes discoveries about socialization, romance, sex, and stress as a man that leads her to conclude, "[Men] have different problems than women have, but they don't have it better"; however, Vincent developed controversial opinions about sex and gender, claiming that transgender people are not legitimate until they undergo hormone therapy and surgical intervention. After writing Self-Made Man, Vincent became a victim of depression; she died by medically assisted suicide in 2022.

==== Bacha posh ====
Bacha posh, an Afghan tradition, involves the cross-dressing of young Afghan girls by their families so that they present to the public as boys. Families without sons, or whose sons are heavily outnumbered by daughters, may choose to raise one of their daughters bacha posh for a number of reasons. Having a bacha posh daughter may ease financial burdens, as girls and women are generally prohibited from work in contemporary Afghanistan, and improve their social status, as families with boys tend to be more well regarded in Afghan society. While there is no law that prohibits bacha posh, girls are expected to revert to traditional gender norms upon reaching puberty. According to Thomas Barfield, an anthropology professor at Boston University, bacha posh is "one of the most under-investigated" topics in the realm of gender studies, making difficult to determine exactly how common the practice is in Afghan society. However, some prominent female figures in Afghan society have admitted to being bacha posh in their youth. A more famous example of this is Afghan parliament member Azita Rafaat. Rafaat claims that bacha posh was a positive experience that built her self-confidence in Afghanistan's heavily patriarchal society and gave her a more well rounded understanding of women's issues in Afghanistan.

== Fashion ==
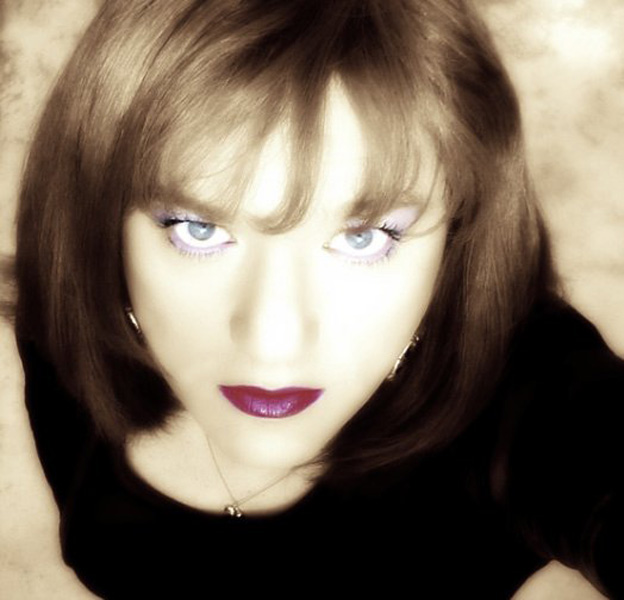
Some male cross-dressers seek a more subtle feminine image.

The actual determination of cross-dressing is largely socially constructed. For example, in Western society, trousers have long been adopted for usage by women, and when women wear them it is no longer regarded as cross-dressing. In cultures where men have traditionally worn skirt-like garments such as the kilt or sarong, these are not seen as women's clothing, and men who wear them are not seen as cross-dressing. In many parts of the world, it remains socially disapproved for men to wear clothes traditionally associated with women.

Cosplaying may also involve cross-dressing, for some females may wish to dress as a male, and vice versa; this practice is sometimes called crossplay. Females may choose to chest bind while cosplaying a male character.

While creating a more feminine figure, male cross-dressers may utilize breast forms or breast plates to give the appearance of breasts. Some male cross-dressers may also cinch their waists or use padding to create a profile that appears more stereotypically feminine.

While most male cross-dressers utilize clothing associated with modern women, some are involved in subcultures that involve dressing as little girls or in vintage clothing. Some such men have written that they enjoy dressing as femininely as possible, so they wear frilly dresses with lace and ribbons, bridal gowns complete with veils, as well as multiple petticoats, corsets, girdles and/or garter belts with nylon stockings.

The term underdressing is used by male cross-dressers to describe wearing female undergarments such as panties under their male clothes. The famous low-budget film-maker Edward D. Wood Jr. (who also went out in public dressed in drag as "Shirley", his female alter ego) said he often wore women's underwear under his military uniform as a Marine during World War II. Female masking is a form of cross-dressing in which men wear masks that present them as female.

Some drag kings may use binders or chest plates to give the impression of a more stereotypically male physique, but others forego this. They may also paste or draw on fake facial hair. Drag kings may use a phallic prosthetic for packing to create the appearance of having male genitals.

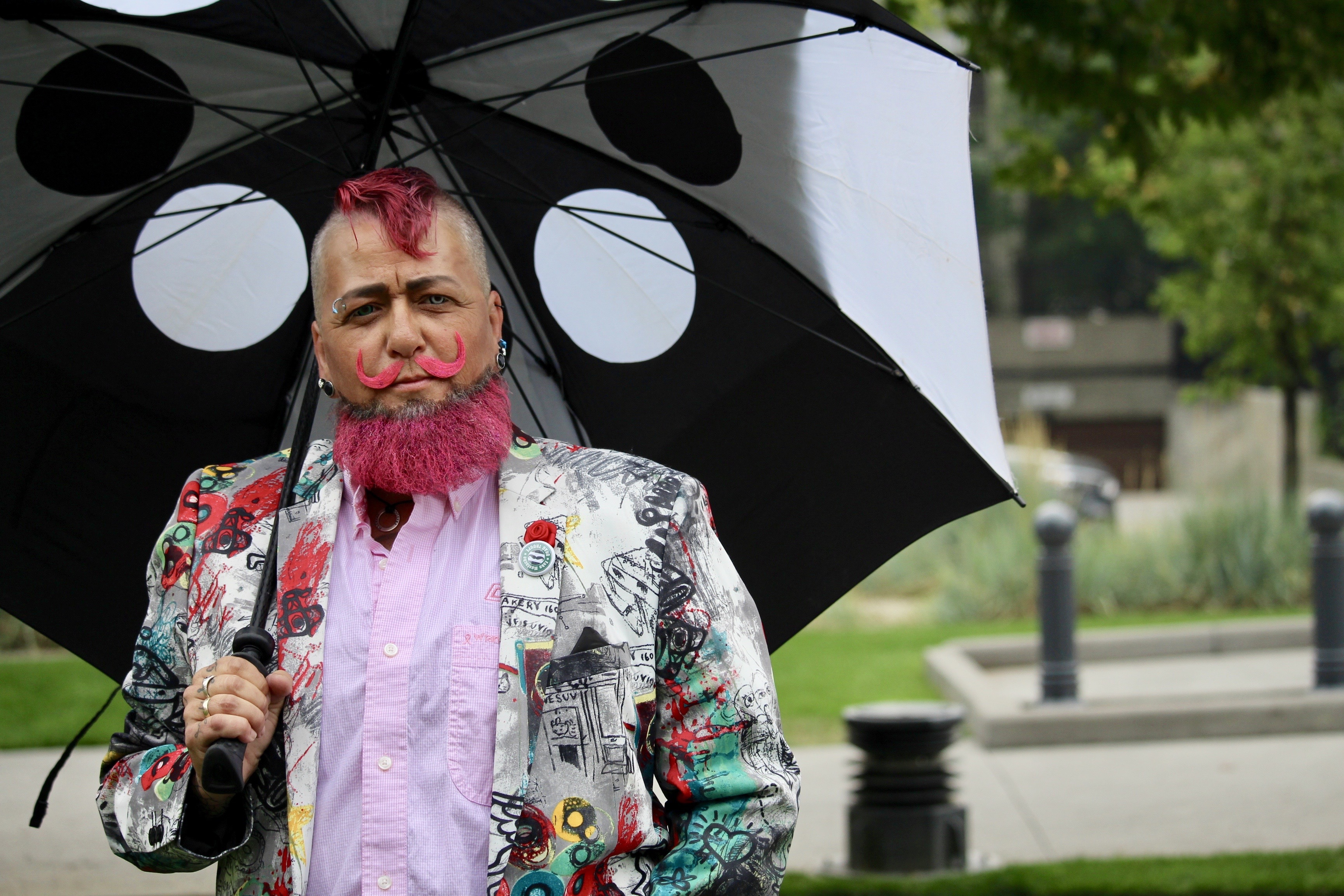
Example of drag king utilizing fake facial hair

== Social issues ==
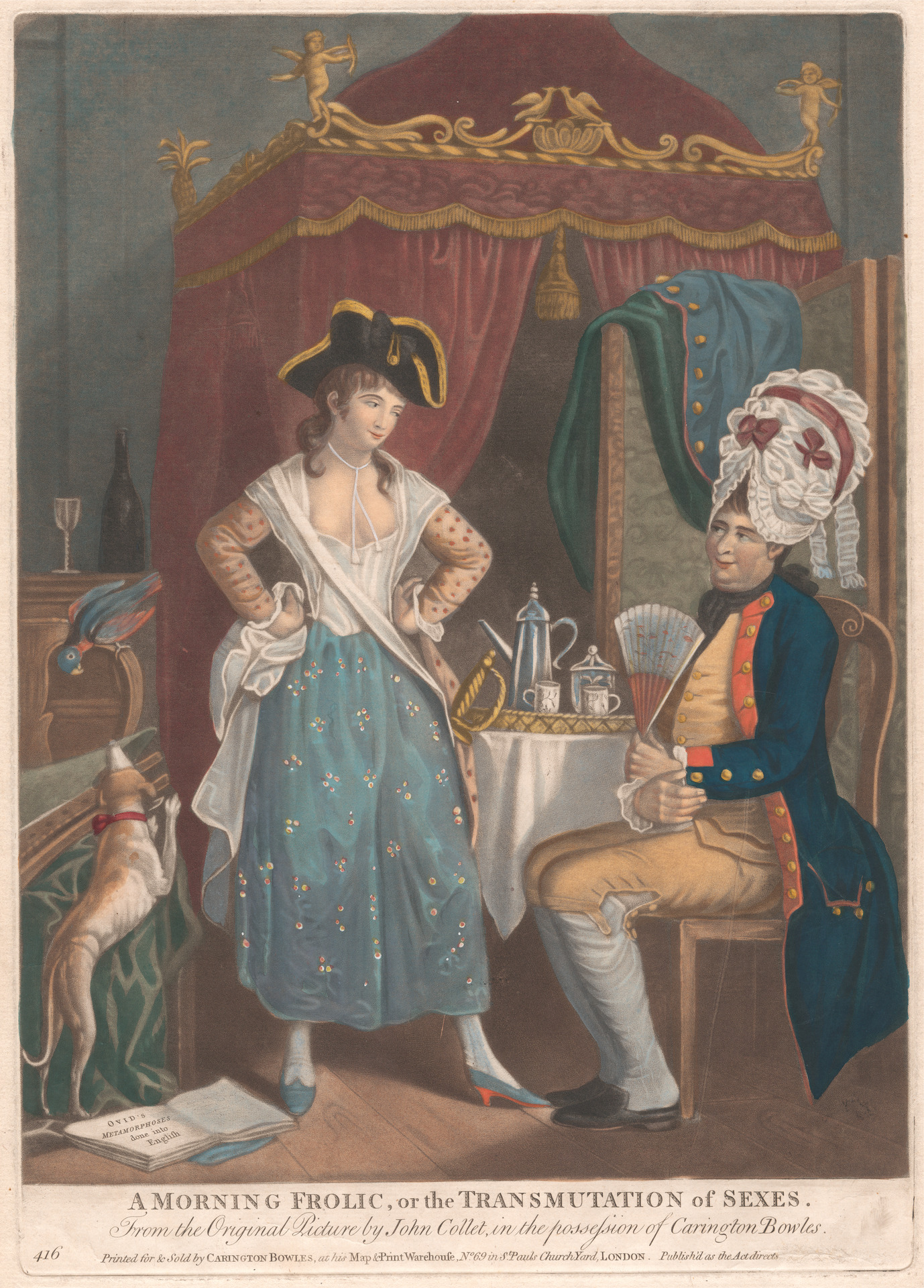
A Morning Frolic, or the Transmutation of the Sexes (c. 1780, artist unknown) depicts a man and a woman exchanging items of clothing in a parody of the satirical drawings of John Collet, which were considered to be vulgar at the time.

Cross-dressers may begin wearing clothing associated with the opposite sex in childhood, using the clothes of a sibling, parent, or friend. Some parents have said they allowed their children to cross-dress and, in many cases, the child stopped when they became older. The same pattern often continues into adulthood, where there may be confrontations with a spouse, partner, family member, or friend. Married cross-dressers can experience considerable anxiety and guilt if their spouse objects to their behavior.

Sometimes because of guilt or other reasons cross-dressers dispose of all their clothing, a practice called "purging", only to start collecting the other gender's clothing again.

== Publications ==
=== Transvestia ===
In 1960, Virginia Prince published the first issue of Transvestia, a magazine aimed at cross-dressers. Prince funded the initial publication with a capital of one hundred dollars raised through personal acquaintances. The first issue was published by Prince's Chevalier Publications, and sold by subscription and through adult bookstores.

In 1963, the inside jacket of the magazine stated the publication as "dedicated to the needs of the sexually normal individual who has discovered the existance [sic] of his or her 'other side' and seeks to express it." Rather than relying on a team of professional authors, this magazine was to be"written by... the readers" with the editor's job to be organizing and categorizing these submissions as appropriate.

Transvestia was published bi-monthly by Prince between the years of 1960 and 1980, with a total of 100 issues being created. The subsequent 11 issues were edited and published by Carol Beecroft (the co-founder of Chevalier publications) until 1986.

With a readership of mostly white, middle-to-professional-class cross-dressers, the magazine offered, among other things, dozens of published life stories and letters contributed by other cross-dressers.

=== Beaumont Bulletin ===
The Beaumont Society began in the UK in 1966 as an offshoot of Virginia Prince's Full Personality Expression group for cross-dressers. The society began to distribute its publication the Beaumont Bulletin in January 1968. Starting out at eight pages, it reached 24 pages by 1970. The publication referred to its readers as 'girls', and included tips on make-up and women's clothing, especially those in larger sizes. In 1977, a new publication, Beaumag, was issued which included fiction and comic writing. As of 2024, the society was still publishing a magazine for its members, entitled Beaumont Magazine.

=== En Femme ===
Between 1987 and 1991, JoAnn Roberts and CDS published a magazine called En Femme that was "for the transvestite, transsexual, cross-dresser, and female impersonator".

=== Others ===
Chrysalis Quarterly was Dallas Denny's publication from the 1990s focused on gender identity, including cross-dressing and transgender issues.

Femme Mirror was a quarterly newsletter/magazine of Tri-Ess begun by Carol Beecroft, and catered to the cross-dresser community.

Transgender Tapestry magazine began as the TV-TS Tapestry newsletter by Merissa Sherrill Lynn's Tiffany Club. It was published from 1979 to 2008, and continues as an online website of the International Foundation for Gender Education.

Empathy Magazine was a publication in the United States focused on support for cross-dressers and their families.

== Festivals ==
Celebrations of cross-dressing occur in widespread cultures. The Abissa festival in Côte d'Ivoire, Ofudamaki in Japan, Śmiergust in Poland, and Kottankulangara Festival in India are all examples of this.

== Analysis ==
Advocacy for social change has done much to relax the constrictions of gender roles on men and women, but they are still subject to prejudice from some people.

The reason it is so hard to have statistics for female cross-dressers is that the line where wearing traditionally masculine clothes stops and cross-dressing begins has become blurred, whereas the same line for men is as well defined as ever. This is one of the many issues being addressed by third wave feminism as well as the modern-day masculist movement.

The general culture has very mixed views about cross-dressing. A woman who wears her husband's shirt to bed is considered attractive, while a man who wears his wife's nightgown to bed may be considered transgressive. Marlene Dietrich in a tuxedo was considered very erotic whereas Jack Lemmon in a dress was considered ridiculous. All this may result from an overall gender role rigidity for males; that is, because of the prevalent gender dynamic throughout the world, men frequently encounter discrimination when deviating from masculine gender norms, particularly violations of heteronormativity. A man's adoption of feminine clothing is often considered a lowering of status in the gendered social order whereas a woman's adoption of what are traditionally men's clothing (at least in the English-speaking world) has less of an impact because women have been traditionally subordinate to men, unable to effect serious change through style of dress. Thus, when a male cross-dresser puts on his clothes, he transforms into the quasi-female and thereby becomes an embodiment of the conflicted gender dynamic. Gender scholar Judith Butler argues that all gender proceeds along through ritualized performances, but in male cross-dressing it becomes a performative "breaking" of the masculine and a "subversive repetition" of the feminine.

Psychoanalysts today do not regard cross-dressing by itself as a psychological problem, unless it interferes with a person's life. "For instance", said Joseph Merlino, senior editor of Freud at 150: 21st Century Essays on a Man of Genius, "[suppose that]...I'm a cross-dresser and I don't want to keep it confined to my circle of friends, or my party circle, and I want to take that to my wife and I don't understand why she doesn't accept it, or I take it to my office and I don't understand why they don't accept it, then it's become a problem because it's interfering with my relationships and environment."

== Cross-dressing in the 21st century ==
=== Fashion trends ===
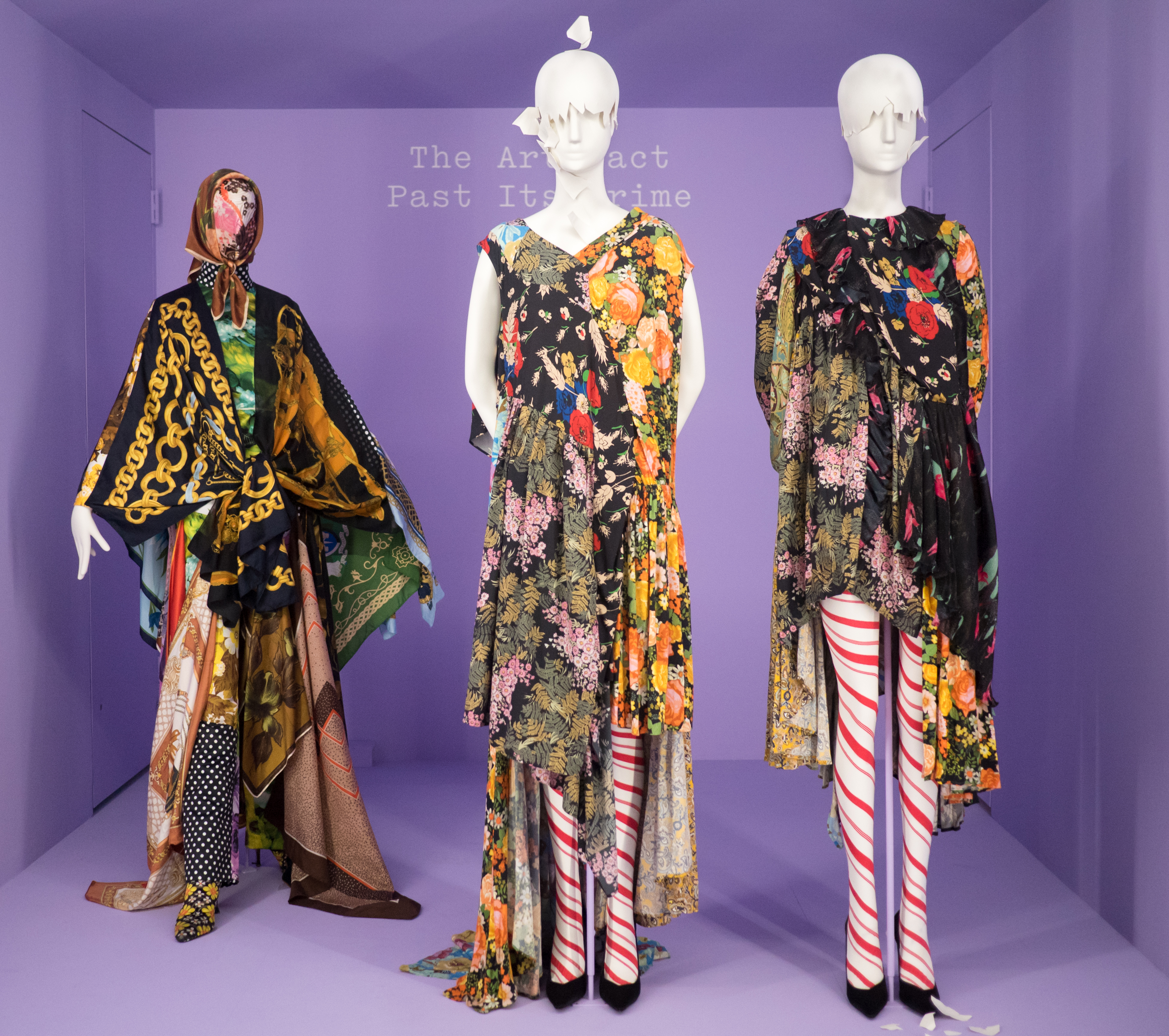
Camp fashion made an appearance during the 2019 Met Gala which had the theme of "Camp: Notes on Fashion", A themed exhibit of the same name was later displayed at the Met Fifth Avenue.

Cross-dressing today is much more common and normalized due to trends such as camp fashion and androgynous fashion. Camp is a style of fashion that has had a long history extending all the way back to the Victorian era to the modern era. During the Victorian era up until the mid-20th century, it was defined as an exaggerated and flamboyant style of dressing. This was typically associated with ideas of effeminacy, de-masculization, and homosexuality. As the trend entered the 20th century, it also developed an association with a lack of conduct, creating the connotation that those who engaged in Camp are unrefined, improper, distasteful, and, essentially, undignified. Though this was its former understanding, Camp has now developed a new role in the fashion industry. It is considered a fashion style that has "failed seriousness" and has instead become a fun way of self-expression. Thanks to its integration with high fashion and extravagance, Camp is now seen as a high art form of absurdity: including loud, vibrant, bold, fun, and empty frivolity.

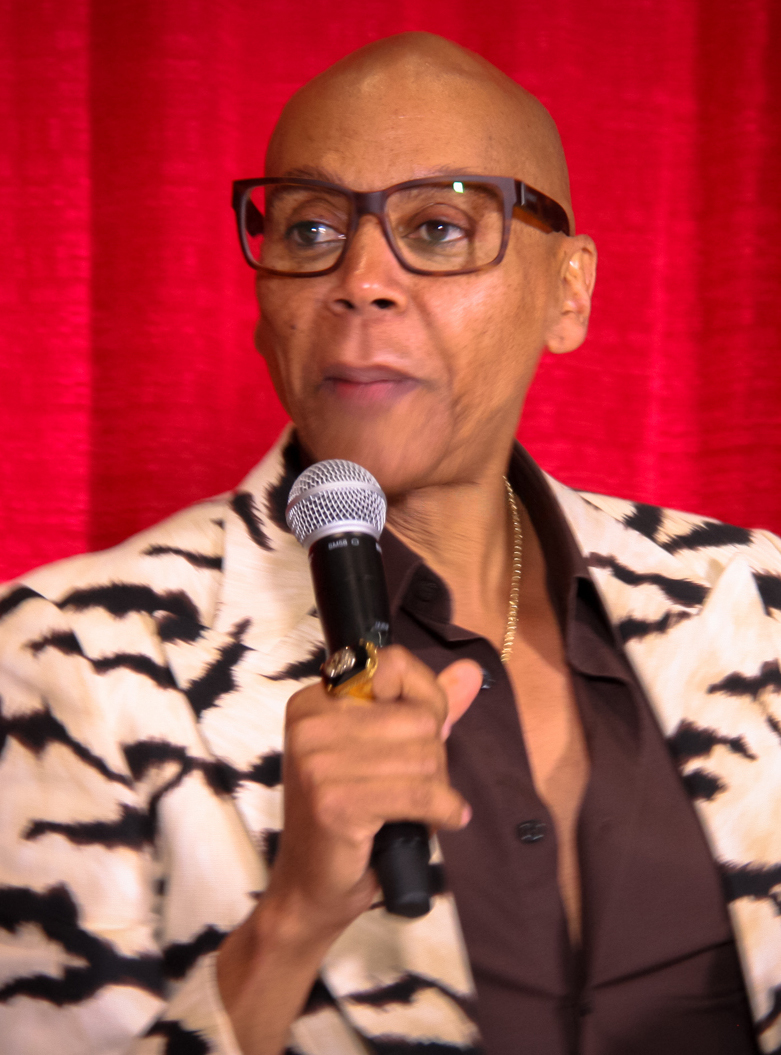
Drag icon RuPaul speaking at RuPaul's DragCon in Los Angeles in 2019.

Camp is often used in drag culture as a method of exaggerating or inversing traditional conceptions of what it means to be feminine. In actuality, the QTPOC community has had a large impact on Camp. This is exhibited by ballroom culture, camp/glamour queens, Black '70s funk, Caribbean Carnival costumes, Blaxploitation movies, "pimp/player fashion", and more. This notion has also been materialized by camp icons such as Josephine Baker and RuPaul.

Androgynous fashion is described as neither masculine nor feminine; rather, it is the embodiment of a gender inclusive and sexually neutral fashion of expression. The general understanding of androgynous fashion is mixing both masculine and feminine pieces with the goal of producing a look that has no visual differentiations between one gender or another. This look is achieved by masking the general body so that one cannot identify the biological sex of an individual given the silhouette of the clothing pieces: Therefore, many androgynous looks include looser, baggier clothing that can conceal curves in the female body or using more "feminine" fabrics and prints for men.

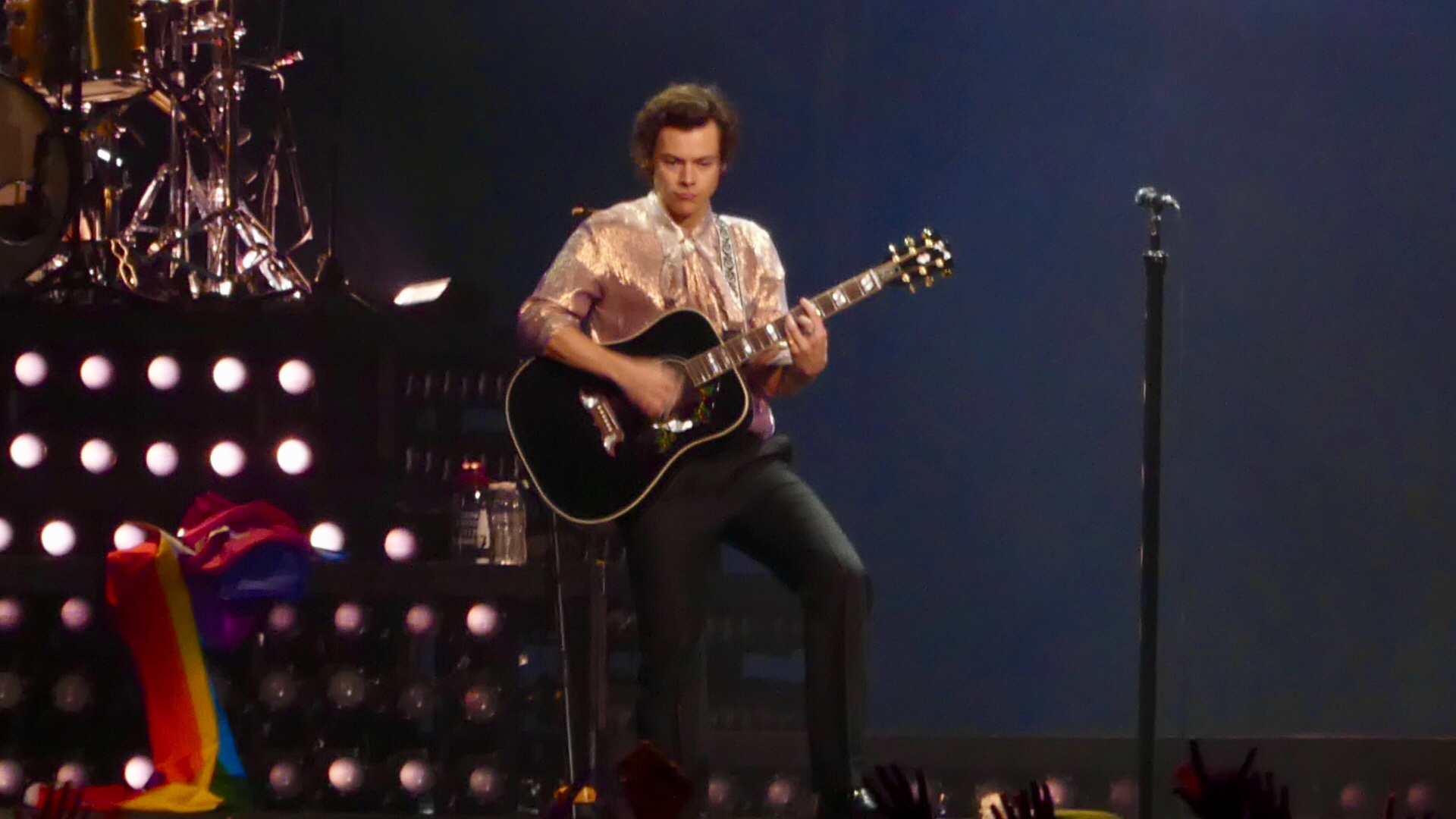
Musician Harry Styles wearing a shimmery pussy-bow blouse at a concert in Saint Paul in 2018.

Both of these style forms have been normalized and popularized by celebrities such as Harry Styles, Timothée Chalamet, Billie Eilish, Troye Sivan, Young Thug, and more.

=== Societal changes ===
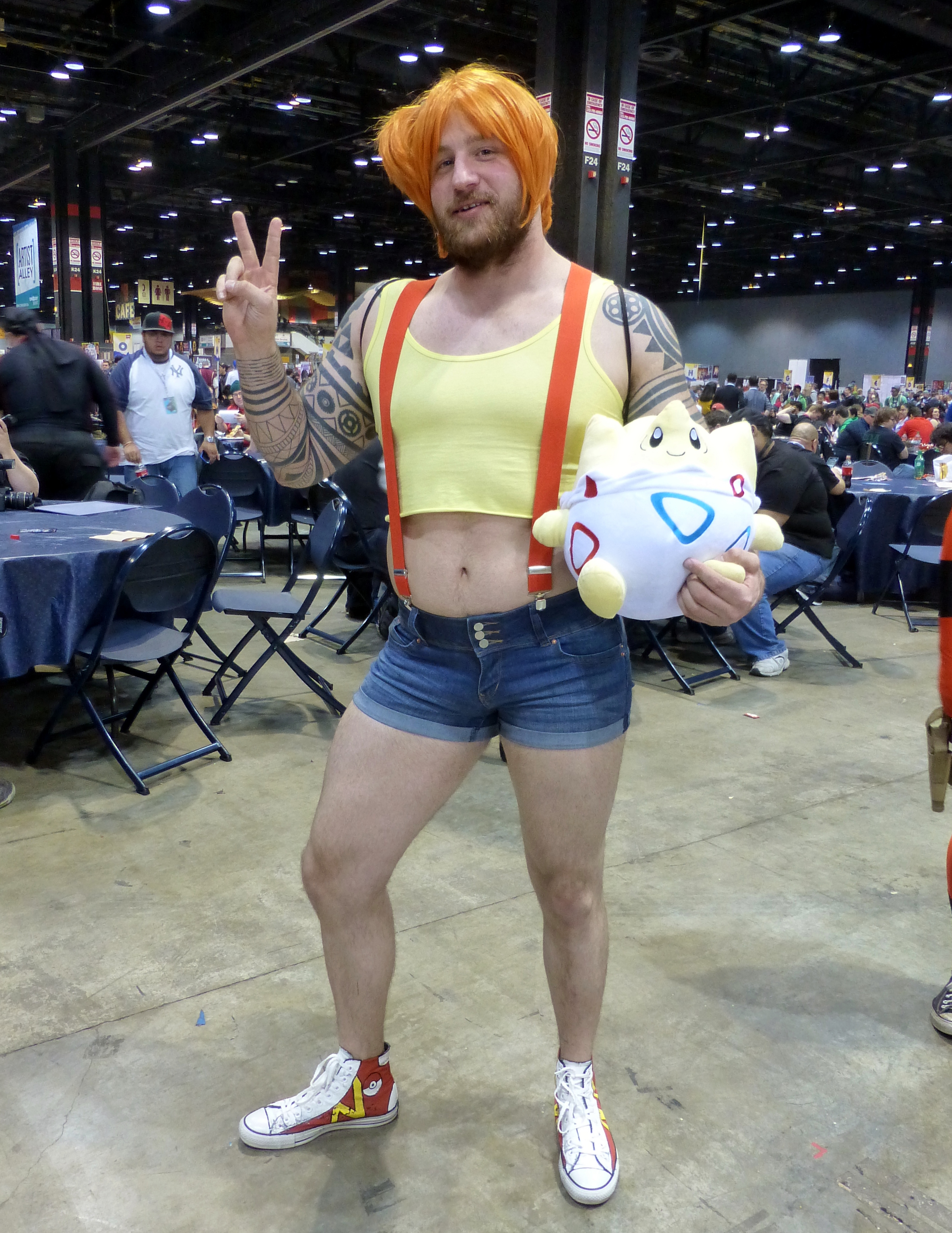
A person crossplaying as Misty from the popular anime Pokémon at Chicago Comic & Entertainment Expo in 2015.

Beyond fashion, cross-dressing in non-Western countries has not fully outgrown the negative connotations that it has in the West. For instance, many Eastern and Southeastern Asian countries have a narrative of discrimination and stigma against LGBTQ+ and cross-dressing individuals. This is especially evident in the post-pandemic world. During this time, it was clear to see the failures of these governments to provide sufficient support to these individuals due to a lack of legal services, lack of job opportunity, and more. For instance, to be able to receive government aid, these individuals need to be able to quickly change their legal name, gender, and other information on official ID documents. This fault augmented the challenges of income loss, food insecurity, safe housing, healthcare, and more for many trans and cross-dressing individuals. This was especially pertinent as many of these individuals relied on entertainment and sex work for income. With the pandemic removing these job opportunities, the stigmatisation and discrimination against these individuals only increased, especially in Southeast Asian countries.

On the other hand, some Asian countries have grown to be more accepting of cross-dressing as modernization has increased. For instance, among Japan's niche communities, there exists the otokonoko. This is a group of male-assigned individuals who engage in female cross-dressing as a form of gender expression. This trend originated with manga and grew with an increase in maid cafes, cosplaying, and more in the 2010s. With the normalization of this through cosplay, cross-dressing has become a large part of otaku and anime culture.

In 2023, Noor Alsaffar, an Iraqi vlogger and model, who described themselves as a cross-dresser, was murdered. The killing of Alsaffar appears to be linked to an increase in homophobia and transphobia in Iraq.

== Across media ==
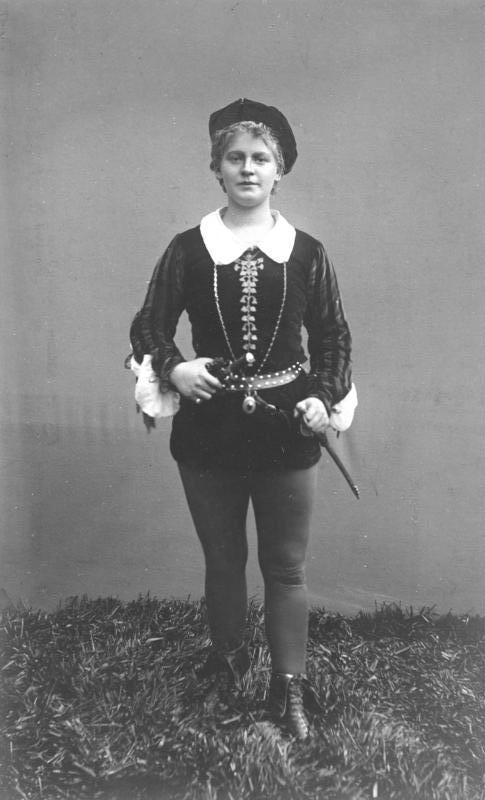
Actress Lucie Höflich portraying Viola in a Berlin production of Twelfth Night in 1907

Women dressed as men, and less often men dressed as women, is a common trope in fiction and folklore. For example, in Thrymskvitha, Thor disguised himself as Freya. These disguises were also popular in Gothic fiction, such as in works by Charles Dickens, Alexandre Dumas, père, and Eugène Sue, and in a number of Shakespeare's plays, such as Twelfth Night. In The Wind in the Willows, Toad dresses as a washerwoman, and in The Lord of the Rings, Éowyn pretends to be a man.

In science fiction, fantasy and women's literature, this literary motif is occasionally taken further, with literal transformation of a character from male to female or vice versa. Virginia Woolf's Orlando: A Biography focuses on a man who becomes a woman, as does a warrior in Peter S. Beagle's The Innkeeper's Song; while in Geoff Ryman's The Warrior Who Carried Life, Cara magically transforms herself into a man.

Ma Rainey, a pioneer of the blues genre in the late 19th century, was known for her masculine presenting attire as part of her stage performances and openly defying the conventional gender expectations for Black women performers of her time. Gladys Bentley was another notable cross-dressing figure in 1920s media popularized for her bawdy songs and three piece suits. She experienced both acclaim and harassment for her cross-dressing and butch persona onstage and employed a chorus of drag queens as her backup singers.

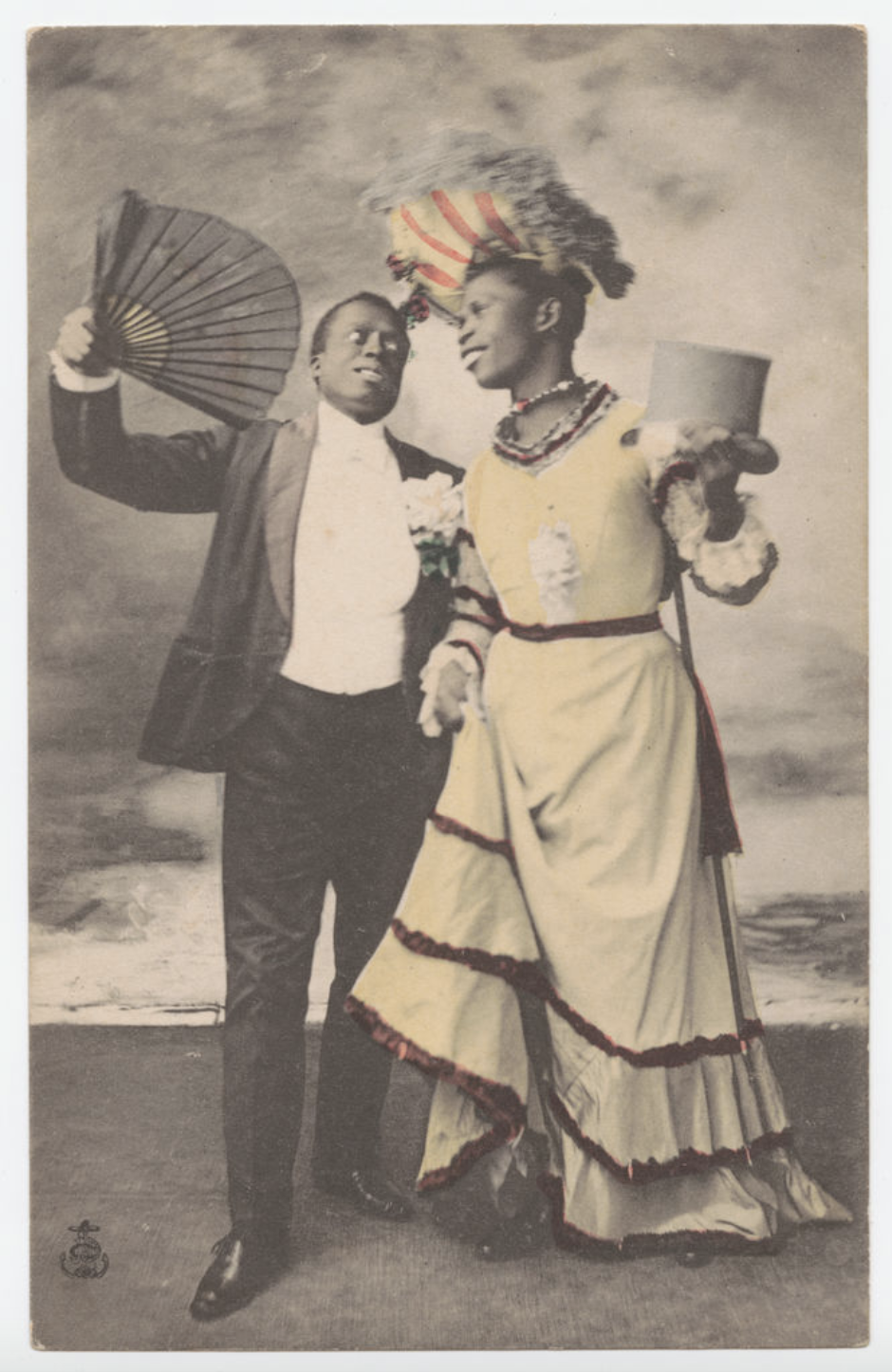
Postcard of female and male impersonators and transvestites, from the Cornell University Library's Division of Rare and Manuscript Collections, photograph taken in 1902 for the show "Joyeux nègres"

C. Riley Snorton's 2017 book Black on Both Sides: a Racial History of Trans Identity looks at the complex history of Black gender nonconformity and cross-dressing in America.

Other popular examples of gender disguise include Madame Doubtfire (published as Alias Madame Doubtfire in the United States) and its movie adaptation Mrs. Doubtfire, featuring a man disguised as a woman. Similarly, the movie Tootsie features Dustin Hoffman disguised as a woman, while the movie The Associate features Whoopi Goldberg disguised as a man. Japanese fashion designer and visual kei musician Mana of the bands Malice Mizer and Moi dix Mois is notable for wearing traditionally female clothes. He is credited with popularizing cross-dressing among visual kei bands.

== Medical views ==
The International Statistical Classification of Diseases and Related Health Problems once listed dual-role transvestism (non-sexual cross-dressing) and fetishistic transvestism (cross-dressing for sexual pleasure) as disorders in its 10th edition, but both were removed for the 11th edition, which came into effect in 2022.

When cross-dressing occurs for erotic purposes over a period of at least six months and also causes significant distress or impairment, the behavior is considered a mental disorder in the United States Diagnostic and Statistical Manual of Mental Disorders, and the psychiatric diagnosis "transvestic fetishism" is applied. Under the name transvestic disorder, it is categorized as a paraphilic disorder in the DSM-5. The DSM-5 defines a paraphilic disorder as "a paraphilia that is currently causing distress or impairment to the individual or a paraphilia whose satisfaction has entailed personal harm, or risk of harm, to others", adding that paraphilias do not necessarily require or justify psychiatric treatment by themselves.

For the next edition of the DSM the aim is to harmonize with the International Classification of Diseases (ICD-11) as much as possible.

== See also ==
- Breeches role
- Breeching (boys)
- Cross-dressing ball
- Cross-gender acting
- Femboy
- Feminization (activity)
- Femminiello
- Gender-based dress codes
- Gender bender
- Gender identity
- Gender variance
- List of transgender-related topics
- List of transgender-rights organizations
- List of wartime crossdressers
- Muxe
- Sex and gender distinction
- Social construction of gender
- Sexual orientation hypothesis
- Sumptuary law, laws specifying who can wear which clothing
- Transsexual
- Tri-Ess, international support group for cross-dressers and those close to them
- Womanless wedding, a comic all-male performance of a wedding

== Sources ==
- Ackroyd, Peter. Dressing Up, Transvestism and Drag: The History of an Obsession. Simon and Schuster, 1979. ISBN 0671250914
- Mancini, Elena. A Brighter Shade of Pink: Magnus Hirschfeld. ProQuest, 2007. ISBN 0549700552
- Ambrosio, Giovanna. Transvestism, Transsexualism in the Psychoanalytic Dimension. Karnac Books, 2011. ISBN 178049307X
