= Indiana Crossdresser Society =

Former organization

The Indiana Crossdressers Society (also referred to as IXE or Iota Chi Sigma) was an Indiana-based organization for gender-conflicted people, including crossdressers, transsexuals, transgender people, and drag queens. IXE was active from 1987 to around 2005 and at one point consisted of over 100 members from Ohio, Indiana, and Kentucky.

== Founding and membership ==
The Indiana Crossdressers Society initially began as an off-shoot of Cross-Port, a Cincinnati-based support group for crossdressers. At least two of the founders, Betty and Lori, had been traveling to Cincinnati from Indiana to attend Cross-Port meetings. A third founder, Yvonne Cook, was a member of several organizations in Chicago and on the national level, including Tri-Ess.

IXE held their first meeting in Indianapolis on January 29, 1987. 13 people were in attendance. However, by the time the Indianapolis Star published a feature on the group in November 1989, IXE boasted at least 100 members from Ohio, Kentucky, and Indiana.

The Star reported that most members were heterosexual men who worked in a wide variety of professions including carpentry, policing, and law enforcement. However, at least one member of IXE identified as a "pre-operative transsexual," and another described herself whilst crossdressing as "dressed as the woman I am deep inside instead of my biological male self."

== Activities ==
Early on, IXE advertised their monthly membership meetings in The New Works News and Indianapolis Star. While the organization kept their meeting place private for safety reasons, they did provide a public P.O. box and phone number for prospective members. Private, internal communications show that the organization often met at gay bars, including G.G.'s, 21 Club, and the Uptown Connection.

IXE's monthly meetings consisted of a mix of workshops, social activities, and political business. One meeting consisted of an ice cream social with homemade pies, a make-up lesson from a cosmetologist, and a discussion of discrimination being experienced at local bars. Other meetings included seminars on skincare and hair care and fashion shows where the models were all IXE Members. Spouses would sometimes join in on these meetings.

In addition to monthly meetings, IXE participated in a variety of special events. During the holidays, IXE often invited members from Cross-Port, a Cincinnati-based organization, to join them for Christmas dinner. They also were involved in various Pride activities around Indianapolis. The organization ran a booth at the Justice Gay and Lesbian Pride Week Picnic in June 1989 and at Celebration on the Circle in June 1990.

== Conflict with gay bars ==
In early 1989, two of Indianapolis's gay bars, 21 Club and G.G.'s, closed within months of each other. Both bars were described as "places for all segments of the gay community, including transvestites, transsexuals, female impersonators, leather people, lesbians, guppies and so forth." This closure led to an influx of crossdressers and drag queens at the remaining gay bars, including Our Place, Jimmy's, and The Varsity.

In response to this influx, Our Place implemented a dress code that barred men wearing make-up, wigs, or feminine clothing. Other bars began to deny entry to crossdressers on the basis that their appearance did not match their identification, despite the fact that Indiana driver's licenses did not require a photo at the time. When asked by The New Works News why they had chosen to implement such policies, the bars cited the presence of rambunctious and disorderly drag queens, complaints from regular customers, and a desire to remain "masculine" establishments.

These new, restrictive policies had an impact on several IXE members and events. For example, Jimmy's cancelled a reservation for 10 IXE members at their bar and restaurant, citing potential issues with identification and complaints from customers. Separately, at least three IXE members were asked to leave from either The Varsity or Our Place based on issues with their identification. On one occasion, Roberta "Bobbi" Alyson was denied entry to Our Place and asked by staff to speak with an off-duty cop in the parking lot. When Bobbi panicked and ran, they were pursued by the officer, wrestled to the ground, and placed in jail overnight.

As a result of these incidents, the Indiana Crossdresser Society claimed that the bars were discriminating against them and published a series of letters detailing the incidents in The New Works News. Local civil rights organizations, including Justice, Inc. and the Indiana Civil Liberties Union, supported IXE's claims.

On July 16, 1989, a meeting between IXE and the bar owners was organized by Shirley Purvitis, the Indianapolis Metropolitan Police Department liaison to the gay community. Present at the meeting were representatives from The Varsity, Our Place, the Indiana Civil Liberties Union, Justice, Inc., IXE, as well as members of the media and the police force. The meeting did little to resolve the tensions between the two parties, but did manage to clarify the requirements of local excise laws.

At the request of IXE, Justice, Inc. launched an investigation to determine whether or not the bars practices were discriminatory. Ultimately, their report, which was released in October 1989, advocated for uniform policies that were "applied sincerely and systematically" and promoted "a climate of acceptance." Justice, Inc. also held at least two subsequent workshops highlighting discrimination within the gay community.

By December 1989, IXE member Kerry Gean Robinson reported that all but one of the bars had reversed their discriminatory practices.

== Dissolution ==
IXE continued to provide support to members until at least 2005.
