= Tri-Ess =

Organization for heterosexual cross-dressers

Society for the Second Self
- Nickname: Tri-Ess, Tri-Sigma
- Predecessor: Foundation for Personality Expression, Mamselle
- Formation: 1976; 50 years ago
- Founder: Virginia Prince, Carol Beecroft
- Location: United States of America
- Website: www.triess.org

Tri-Ess (Society for the Second Self) is an international educational, social, and support group for heterosexual cross-dressers, their partners, and their families.

== History ==
Tri-Ess was founded in 1976 by the merging of two existing groups for crossdressers, Mamselle, a group formed by Carol Beecroft, and another group called Full Personality Expression (FPE), which was formed by Virginia Prince. In 1976, Prince described Tri-Ess as "an organisation limited to heterosexual cross dressers and to those who are not involved in such behaviour patterns as bondage, punishment, fetishism for rubber, leather or other, or domination and humiliation." Applications to join required the applicant to have purchased three copies of the Transvestia or Prince's book Understanding Cross Dressing; an interview was not required.

Tri-Ess groups were the first nationally organized spaces for cross-dressing men to gather and socialize. The groups allowed cross-dressers to meet others, learn cross-dressing tips, and lessened the shame and stigma surrounding cross-dressing. Tri-Ess has historically excluded members who were drag-performers or known or suspected to be gay, bisexual, or transsexual. This was reflective of Prince's beliefs that the "true tranvestite" is "exclusively heterosexual", "frequently ... married and often fathers", and "values his male organs, enjoys using them and does not desire them removed". Prince was also known for expressing homophobic sentiments and was a leading opponent of gender-affirming surgery.

Tri-Ess representatives served on the board of directors for the International Foundation for Gender Education (IFGE) and helped found the Southern Comfort Conference, an annual gathering of transgender people, in 1991. Representatives also were on the board of the Gender Public Advocacy Coalition (GenderPAC), one of the first national trans civil rights organizations in the U.S.

Beecroft served as the first President of Tri-Ess and worked to make the organization more inclusive, forming alliances with trans women and gay/bisexual men. She began Tri-Ess's journal, The Femme Mirror, which she edited for over a decade, initiated a confidential mail service, and organized a project to donate books on cross-dressing to local libraries. She also started the annual "Holiday En Femme" event, where members could meet in November and go out cross-dressed, sometimes the only opportunity for members to be feminine in public.

In 1988, Jane Ellen Fairfax was elected chair of the board of directors. Fairfax focused greater attention on the needs of the partners of members, granting them full membership status when they had previously been considered "guests". She started The Sweetheart Connection, a quarterly newsletter by and for wives, and the "Spouses’ and Partners’ International Conference for Education". During her tenure, her wife Mary became editor of The Femme Mirror and expanded its content.

At its height in the early 2000s, Tri-Ess had 25 chapters nationwide that sponsored social events and sessions on legal issues, self-defense, coming out, and feminine dressing. By 2020, only 6 chapters remained.

== Membership, publications, and programs ==
The Femme Mirror
A quarterly magazine covering a wide range of topics in crossdressing, including coming out stories, community news, etc.

Sweetheart Connection
A quarterly newsletter produced by wives, for wives of other crossdressers.
Big Sister Program
New members joining Tri-Ess have the option of being assigned a correspondence Big Sister, serves a supportive role during their first year of membership.
Pen Pal Program
For members who live far away from any chapters, Tri-Ess has a Pen Pal program.
Sisters Across the Sea Program
This program encourages international correspondence between Tri-Ess chapters in the United States and similar organizations abroad.
Holiday en femme
A holiday for crossdressers, hosted each November.
Spouses' and Partners' International Conference on Education (SPICE)
Non-crossdressed event for wives and couples.

== See also ==
- List of transgender-related topics
- List of transgender-rights organizations
