= Beaumont Society =

UK transgender self help organisation

The Beaumont Society is a human rights organisation based in the United Kingdom, which is run by transgender people to support their community. Founded in 1966, and named after the Chevalier d'Éon, it provides social support for transgender people, and legal and medical information for practitioners in those fields. It also published periodicals, including the Beaumont Bulletin.

== Mission and vision ==
The society's mission and vision is stated as:

At the Beaumont Society, our mission is to create a supportive and inclusive environment for all transgender individuals. We envision a world where everyone can express their true selves without fear or prejudice. Through our programs and resources, we strive to educate the public, advocate for equal rights, and provide a safe space for personal growth and community connection.

== History ==
Founded in 1966 as the UK wing of the American organisation Full Personality Expression (FPE), it evolved into the Beaumont Society, naming itself after Chevalier d'Éon de Beaumont who from 1777 lived as Charlotte d’Éon de Beaumont having been officially recognised as a woman by King Louis XVI. One of the co-founders was Alice Purnell, another Alga Campbell. It was founded with two aims. The first was to provide information for legal and medical practitioners, as well as the general public, on trans issues, and the second to provide a social network for transvestite, and later transgender, people.

The first official meeting of the society was held in Southampton in 1966 (although there had been an initial one the year before). The first official meeting had twelve attendees, two of whom were wives of members. In 1969 Virginia Prince, the American founder of FPE, visited Britain, generating publicity for the Beaumont Society.

== Membership ==
By 1973 the society had 233 members. Later in the 1970s it had 700 members. By the late 1970s over 2,000 people had passed through its membership. During this time Stephen Whittle joined the society. In its early years the society was explicit that it was for 'heterosexual transvestites' and that 'overt gayness' was not included. Campaigning to alter this started in the 1980s, By the 1990s transgender people, across a range of sexualities, were explicitly included. In 2025 the membership number is just a little over 700, consisting of members across the UK and Ireland, plus a number of members in North and South America, Europe and Asia.

== Organisation ==
It is the longest running support group for trans people in the UK. It also provides counselling. The society has branches across Britain, such as in Kent, Leeds, as well as other locations. The society's annual dinner was held at Broadcasting House in the 1970s and 1980s, subsequently moving to new Kensington Town Hall.

In 1978, Friends of Eon was established, as a sister organisation to the Beaumont Society but to provide support for transgender people in the Republic of Ireland.

== Activities ==
Members of the Beaumont Society in Leeds, including June Willmott, organised the 1974 conference Transvestism and Transsexuality in Modern Society, the first UK national Trans conference held at the University of Leeds. In 1975 they organised a subsequent conference in Leicester, entitled Transvestism and Allied States in Family and Society. The same year it also established the first charitable trust in the UK for trans people, as well as a helpline.

In 1986, the society supported the establishment of a transgender archive at the University of Ulster, and advertised it to its members.

== Beaumont Bulletin ==
The society began to distribute the Beaumont Bulletin from January 1968. Published every two months, it started at eight pages long, but by 1970 it was regularly 24 pages long. The May 1970 issue was the first to include content written by wives of members. The publication referred to its readers as 'girls', and included tips on make-up application and buying clothes, especially those in larger sizes. The 1976 Christmas edition of the Beaumont Bulletin (Vol 8, No. 5) is held in the collection of the London Museum, while volumes 9-11 (1977–1980) are held by the Wellcome Collection along with a selection of papers belonging to a Society member called Susan.

In 1977, a new companion publication, Beaumag, was issued that included fiction and comic writing. As of 2024, the society still created a publication for its members, now entitled Beaumont Magazine.
