= Cross-dressing, gender identity, and sexuality of Joan of Arc =

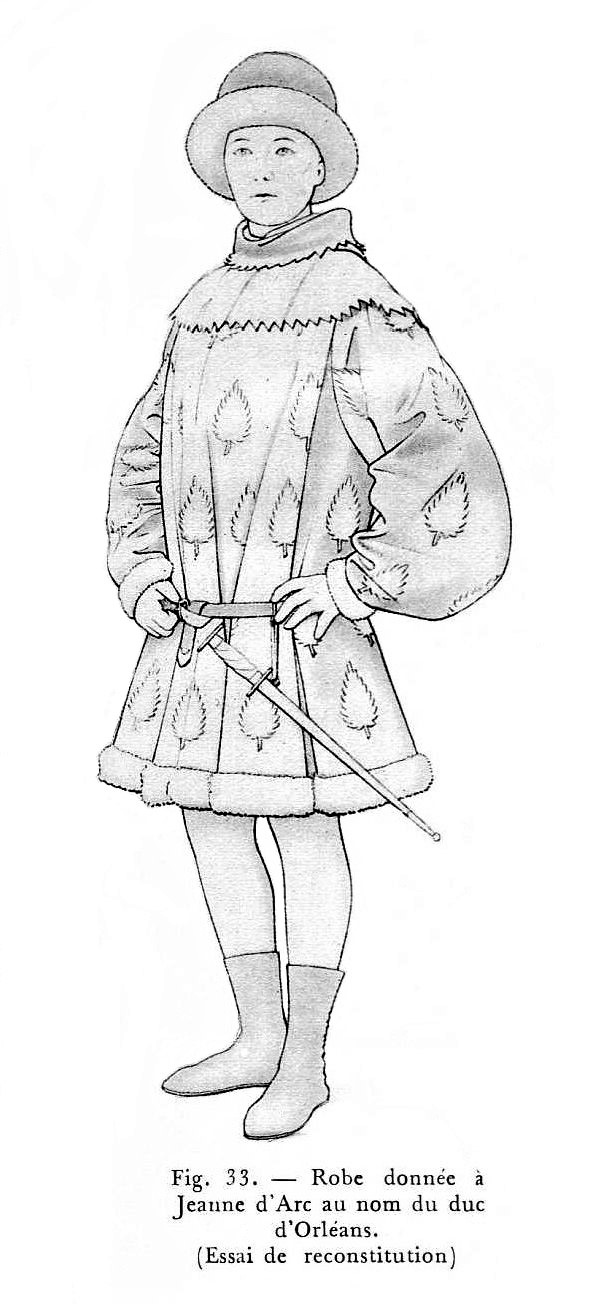
Joan of Arc in male garments, drawing by Adrien Harmand (1929)

Joan of Arc (French: Jeanne d'Arc), a French historical figure condemned for heresy by an ecclesiastical court under English control and executed in 1431, is a national heroine of France and a Roman Catholic saint. She accompanied an army during the Hundred Years' War, adopting the clothing of a soldier, which became the purported basis for her conviction and execution. Joan's adoption of men's clothing has been the subject of debate over the centuries and has been interpreted in religious, historical and cultural contexts.

== Trial and clothing ==
After her capture during the siege of Compiègne while retreating from a failed attack at Margny, Joan was handed over to the English by the Burgundians, imprisoned, and subsequently put on trial for heresy. Despite the judges' attempts to persuade her to renounce her male attire, Joan repeatedly defended it as a "small matter" that was "the commandment of God and his angels". As Régine Pernoud and Marie-Véronique Clin note, "Other questions about her mode of dress provoked only repetitions of these answers: She had done nothing that was not by the commandment of God. Probably not even Cauchon could then have guessed the importance that her mode of dress would come to assume."

Joan signed a cedula, a document in which she agreed to cease wearing male clothing. Some sources suggest that this was done without the benefit of adequate legal safeguards or possibly without her full understanding of the document's content. Later, she resumed wearing male attire in what was considered a "relapse," after the garments had been returned to her by her captors. Contemporary accounts indicate that her captors were aware of her claim that she wore such clothing out of necessity and divine instruction. Under the procedures of the Inquisition, individuals who returned to previously abjured practices could be sentenced to death. On 30 May 1431, Joan of Arc was burned at the stake by her English captors with Church officials present.

== Cross-dressing in Christian hagiography ==
Vern and Bonnie Bullough wrote that despite specific canonical prohibitions, explicit and unconditional approval of cross-gender attire is generally absent in the writings of the Church Fathers. On the contrary, Susan Schibanoff notes that "one version of transvestism appears to have been both admired and encouraged, albeit indirectly, in the legends of female saints who disguised themselves as men to live as monks". Joan's accusers therefore carefully framed their accusations, alleging that Joan retained "nothing about her to display and announce her sex, save Nature's own distinctive marks". Unlike the holy transvestites, who entirely concealed their biological sex, Joan had not concealed her anatomy or other "marks" of her biological femininity.

The "holy transvestite" – a female saint who disguised herself as a man – was a common medieval hagiographical archetype and was occasionally invoked in defense of Joan's clothing. Saint Marina exemplifies the archetype: fearing for her virginity on her wedding night, she cut off her hair, donned male attire, and joined a monastery, passing herself off as "Father Marinos". She was later falsely accused of impregnating an innkeeper's daughter and driven into exile. After her death, Saint Marina was absolved of all guilt.

With regard to the holy transvestite tradition, Simon Gaunt argues that "sexuality is central to the construction of sanctity in the Middle Ages", and that holy men and women are not removed from sexuality, but continue to define themselves through reference to sexuality that has been reshaped and redirected. Echoing medieval historian John Anson, Gaunt describes these legends as a "monastic fantasy" that attempts to appease sexual longing by imagining a woman in the monastery who need not inspire guilt. This appeasement is, however, complexly gendered by the apparent masculinity of many of these women.

By the fifteenth century, stories of such saints had become widespread throughout Europe, with origins reaching back to early Christianity. One of the earliest examples is Saint Thecla, whose story is told in the New Testament apocryphon Acts of Paul and Thecla. According to the legend, she became so enraptured by the teachings of Paul the Apostle that she left her fiancé and followed him, reportedly dressing as a man during a part of her travels. Thecla's story was popular and widespread, with depictions of her and dedications to her ranging from Antioch to Iberia. According to Rudolf Dekker and Lotte van de Pol:

"The transformation into a man was a very dominant theme with [certain] female saints from the fifth to the seventh century. Saint Margaret, for example, was once said to have escaped on her wedding night in men's clothes. [...] A saint especially popular among the common people in Europe from the eleventh century on [...] was Saint Uncumber. She was a Portuguese princess who refused to be married to the heathen King of Sicily, and prayed to God to be saved from this fate. Her salvation was unusual; she suddenly grew a beard. Variations on this theme recur more often. As in many cases, myth and reality interact, and several medieval women took these saints as their models."

Joan of Arc's guides and visions did not include any of the "holy transvestites". Nevertheless, such legends formed part of the religious and cultural context in which Joan's adoption of male clothing was understood.

Outside of Christian hagiography, cross-dressing and miraculous sex changes are recurring motifs in medieval European legends and folktales, as well as in traditions from other parts of the world. Folklorist Stith Thompson describes relatively few traditional "sex tests" for exposing men disguised as women, but numerous ones for women dressed as men. These range from placing a spinning wheel nearby to scattering peas on the ground, which supposedly caused women – but not men – to slip. The latter motif appears in Grimms' Fairy Tales and William Shakespeare's As You Like It, and the method has even been attributed to King Solomon.

== Contemporary perspectives ==
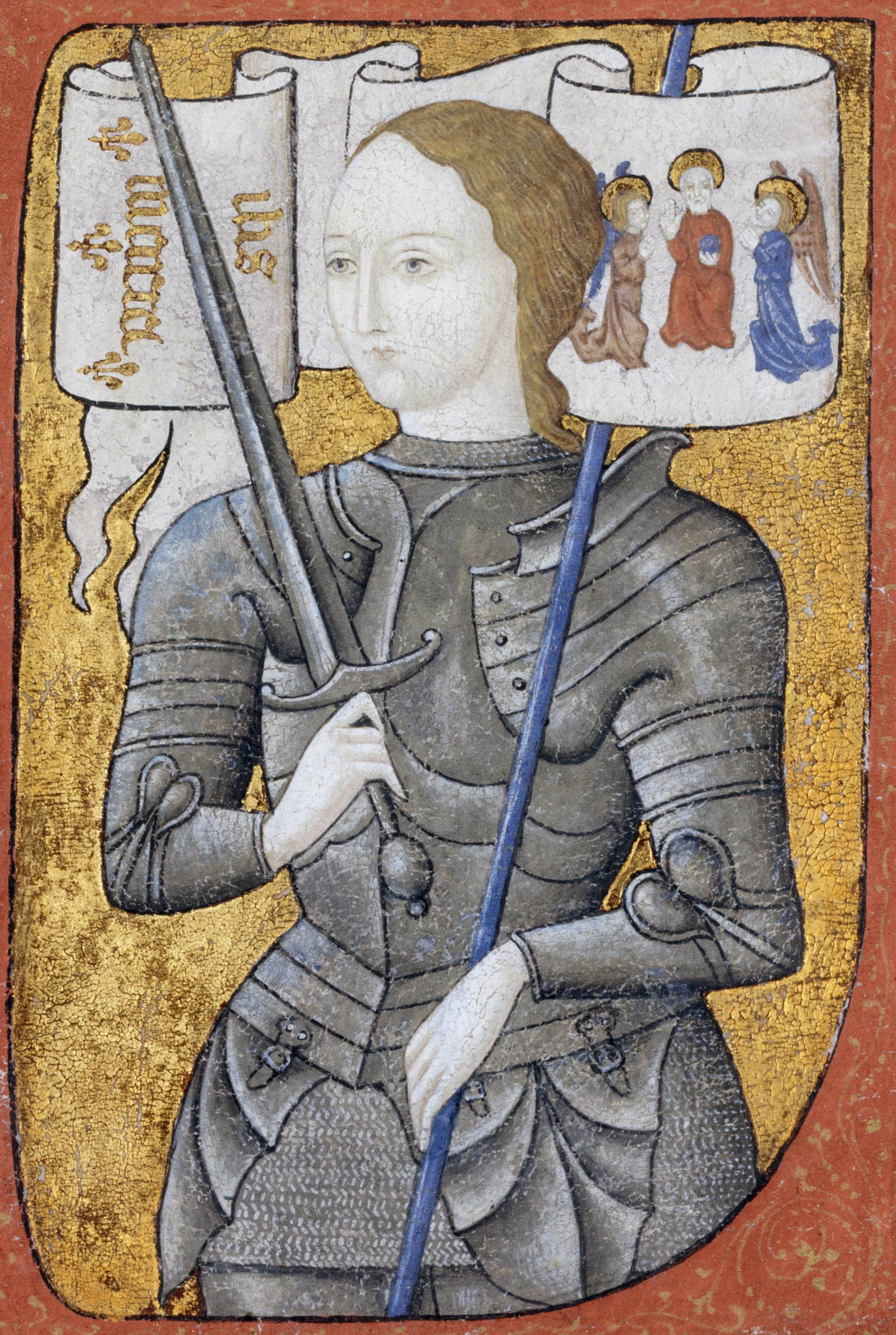
Joan of Arc in armor, with a sword, from one of the "Spetz miniatures" (date uncertain)

During and immediately following her life, perspectives on Joan varied widely, most often along factional lines. Rumors of a woman leading an opposing army were historically used to incite troops against heresy, sorcery, or immorality. English soldiers at the time referred to Joan as a "witch", asked "whether she expected [soldiers] to surrender to a woman", and referred to her troops as "unbelieving pimps". The English author of The Brut claimed that her troops followed her by "crafte of sorcerie". After his defeat at Orleans, Bedford reported to the English crown that his men had been bewitched by a "satanic" agent in the form of a woman dressed in men's clothing. Crane notes that the English and their French Burgundian allies referred to her as a "monstrous woman, disorderly and notorious woman who dresses in men's clothes, whose conduct is dissolute" (femme monstrueuse, femme désordonnée et diffamée, estant en habit d'homme et de gouvernement disslut).

On the other side of the English Channel, the situation was largely reversed. From almost the start of Joan d'Arc's journey, there was little hesitation on the side of the French. Of special note was the loyalty given to her by her soldiers, who were among the most skilled in France. The Bourgeois of Paris claimed that this was because, "all who disobeyed her should be killed without mercy", but the author of the Journal du siege d'Orleans noted that "All regarded her with much affection, men and women, as well as small children." Jean de Mâcon, an eyewitness to the siege of Orleans, noted that there was only one act of derision, while the Cronique de Lorraine added that "All the army promised to always obey her. Each victory motivated more loyalty and further victory. Even disobedience to her higher command seems to have invited loyalty; she brought action and victory, while the older, noble generals achieved nothing but inaction and defeat."

These viewpoints tended to extend to her trials: first the Condemnation trial by the pro-English Burgundians, and later the rehabilitation trial under a commission appointed by Pope Calixtus III and organized by Charles VII. As Pinzino notes,

The pro-English [Burgundian] party into whose hands Joan fell in 1430, over a year after her role in the vital French victory at Orleans, worked to defame her self-asserted divine calling and executed her at age nineteen in the marketplace of Rouen in 1431. In the years following, however, political power in France permanently reverted to the pro-French [Armagnac] party of Joan's supporters. Promptly after Normandy and the city of Rouen itself had been restored to the French (1449) and the ecclesiastical archives there were retrieved and opened, the proceedings to nullify Joan of Arc's condemnation were undertaken by her supporters ... these proceedings were virtually unprecedented in ecclesiastical judicial history.

The Condemnation trial found Joan's transvestism condemning. The primary cross-dressing charge, that Joan dressed entirely as a man "save Nature's own distinctive marks", was designed to evade Aquinas's exceptions on cross dressing—as Raoul Le Sauvage phrased it, to "escape violence and keep one's virginity", was predicated on total disguise and passing. Joan never attempted to "pass", but simply wore the attire of men, thus giving the English cause to condemn her for the act.

After the recapture of Rouen, the site of Joan's trial, Charles VII (who owed his crown to Joan and had supported her as he believed her to be divinely inspired) dispatched a letter on 15 February 1450 which ordered the creation of a commission to reexamine the Condemnation trial, under the leadership of Guillaume d'Estouteville, Charles's cousin. As Pernoud and Clin note, "That trial was now a symbol of complex cultural fissures in search of closure: of the internal fractures of a riven France, of national splits enervated by English invasion, and of religious and civil power struggles sustained by the University of Paris." The rehabilitation trial focused strongly on the transvestism charge, which Pope Pius II noted was problematic. Individuals testifying during the trial stressed the necessity of her dress, both for means of keeping order in her troops in battle and for protecting her chastity. As the trial noted, she wore "long, conjoined hosen, attached to the aforesaid doublet with twenty cords (aiguillettes)" and "tight leggings", with the cords being used to securely tie the parts of the garment together so her clothing couldn't be pulled off by her English guards. Guillaume Manchon testified, "And she was then dressed in male clothing, and was complaining that she could not give it up, fearing lest in the night her guards would inflict some act of [sexual] outrage upon her", a claim backed up by a number of other witnesses. The same justification was given for her relapse by a number of witnesses, such as Friar Martin Ladvenu, Pierre Cusquel, Giullaume Manchon, and Friar Isambart de la Pierre, although a number of others, such as Jean Massieu, Pierre Daron, and Guillaume Colles, alternatively claimed that she was entrapped into wearing male clothing by a guard who took away her female clothing. Jean Moreau testified that he had heard Joan reply to the preacher that she had adopted male clothing during her campaign because she had to live among soldiers, among whom it was more appropriate for her to be in male, rather than female clothing. The court ruled that "nothing improper has been found in her, only good humility, chastity, piety, propriety, simplicity."

== Modern interpretations ==
According to Kelly DeVries, "No person of the Middle Ages, male or female, has been the subject of more study than Joan of Arc. She has been portrayed as saint, heretic, religious zealot, seer, demented teenager, proto-feminist, aristocratic aspirant, savior of France, person who turned the tide of the Hundred Years War and even Marxist liberator."

One of the first modern writers to raise issues of sexuality was novelist Vita Sackville-West. In "Saint Joan of Arc", published in 1936, she indirectly suggests that Joan of Arc may have been a lesbian due to sharing a bed with girls and women.

Rebuttals were forthcoming and are widely mentioned. The most prominent rebuttal refers to the common medieval practice of women sharing beds with one another; bed sharing had no connotations in regard to sexuality. Bonnie Wheeler of the International Joan of Arc Society called the book "dead wrong but fun".

Régine Pernoud credits Joan's clothing to necessity and her belief that it was ordained by God. Among other things, Pernoud cites large amounts of testimony, including Guillaume Manchon from the Rehabilitation trial:

[A]t that time, she was dressed in male clothing, and kept complaining that she could not do without it, fearing that the guards would violate her in the night; and once or twice she had complained to the Bishop of Beauvais, the Vice-Inquisitor, and Master Nicholas Loiseleur that one of the guards had attempted to rape her.

Marina Warner argues that in pre-industrial Europe, a link existed between transvestism and priestly functions, hence justifying the historical interpretation of her as both a witch and a saint. Warner further argues for Joan as not occupying either a male or female gender. "Through her transvestism, she abrogated the destiny of womankind. She could thereby transcend her sex. ... At the same time, by never pretending to be other than a woman and a maid, she was usurping a man's function but shaking off the trammels of his sex altogether to occupy a different, third order, neither male nor female". Warner categorizes Joan as an androgyne.

Under the direction of the Académie française, the Centre Jeanne d'Arc in Orleans has been working on a re-edition of Jules Quicherat's Procès de Jeanne d'Arc. According to Bouzy, Quicherat's work forms the basis of most modern scholarship on Joan, but has been discovered to contain a number of errors, selective editing, and use of "originals" that were often highly edited or manipulated versions of earlier documents.

Relevant to Joan's crossdressing is Jacques Gelu's treatise, one of the theological treatises ordered by Charles VII for her rehabilitation. Quicherat criticized the text as "uninstructive hodgepodge", and, according to him, "made it considerably shorter, taking out parts of the passages where points of religious dogma are discussed". As Bouzy, a member of the Centre working on the project notes,

This text has hardly ever been consulted by historians, although it provides interesting evidence for the way the fifteenth-century church perceived Joan. The text stresses the problem of Joan's cross dressing – this shows that in 1429, even the prelates who supported Charles VII were reluctant to accept a young girl dressed as a man. Apparently, Charles VII decided in favor of Joan only because his confessor, Gérard Machet, was convinced that Joan was the girl whose coming had been announced in a prophecy by Marie Robine, a hermit from Avignon; and even then, Charles required that she be thoroughly examined. Several other treatises that have never been translated (apart from Gerson's tract) are likely to hold surprises for us as well.

Steven Weiskopf begins Secrecy, Specularity, and Speculation with the Bourgeois of Paris's recording of Joan's death, where he describes her being burned to death, then the removal of her clothes to show the audience that she was indeed female ("to take away any doubts from peoples' minds"), and the burning of the rest of her body. Weiskoph states,

What 'doubt' haunts the crowd in the Bourgeois's description? And what secrets in this quasi-pornographic account are the spectators hoping to discover ... Anne Llewellyn Barstow offers the most literal explanation, linking the Bourgeois's morbid description to the crowd's fascination with and confusion over Joan's sexual identity. Troubled by the notion that a woman could be 'a powerful war leader', both friend and foe 'thirsted to know whether she was a man or a woman'. Barstow's reading of the crowd's confusion over Joan's sexuality is neither the feminine or the masculine pronoun, the Bourgeois writes quizzically of Joan, 'What it was, God only knows.' Linked solely to her sexual identity or not, much of this uncertainty about how to interpret Joan remains.

In the Journal of Modern and Medieval Studies, Susan Crane writes, "Isolating transvestism from sexual identity risks assuming both that heterosexuality is the only possible position for Joan and that self-presentation has nothing to do with sexuality – that sexuality is innate and prior to choices of gendered behavior." Crane argues that "an intensified relation to the law produces not her acquiescence in self-correction but instead her persistent effort to distinguish herself from the category of womanhood as she understands it." She notes Joan's repeated justification of her attire that it "pleases God that I wear it" (il plaist a Deu que je le porte, etc.), dodges a question on whether she would like to have been male, and comments that the argument that her defenders at the Rehabilitation trial used – male clothing as a protection against rape – does not stand up when considering how she kept herself identifiably female, slept naked both in field and prison, and given large amounts of Joan's own commentary. Crane backs up the distinction between Joan and the holy transvestites, in that Joan lays claim to her virginity and womanhood instead of burying it, identifying herself as a fighter instead of a traditional religious crossdresser. Bynum notes:

Her continued engagement in secular affairs and her noninstrumental, secular cross-dressing queer her virginity – that is, they move her virginity beyond its canonical meanings in ways that suggest a revision of heterosexual identity.

In her book, Transgender Warriors: Making History From Joan of Arc to Dennis Rodman, transgender author Leslie Feinberg popularized the notion of Joan of Arc being transgender. Under the heading They Called Her 'Hommasse', Feinberg cites Evans and Murray on the "enormous importance" of Joan's male costume to her identity, and states, "Joan of Arc suffered the excruciating pain of being burned alive rather than renounce her identity ... What an inspirational role model – a brilliant transgender peasant teenager leading an army of laborers into battle." In Evolution's Rainbow: Diversity, Gender, and Sexuality in Nature and People, transgender biologist Joan Roughgarden cites and agrees with Feinberg's assessment, describing Joan as a "male-identified trans person". Leslie Feinberg argues in Transgender Liberation that "Joan of Arc was burned at the stake by the Inquisition of the Catholic church because she refused to stop dressing as a man." According to Feinberg, "she was a transvestite – an expression of her identity she was willing to die for rather than renounce." Feinberg criticises that

Many historians and academicians have seen Joan's transvestism as inconsequential. In the verbatim proceedings of her interrogation, however, the court records show that Joan's judges found her transvestism repugnant and demanded that she wear women's clothing. Joan of Arc's testimony in her own defense revealed how deeply her transvestism was rooted in her identity. She vowed, 'For nothing in the world will I swear not to arm myself and put on a man's dress.'"

== Notes ==
=== Sources ===
- Harmand, Adrien (1929). Jeanne d'Arc: Ses Costumes, Son Armure [Joan of Arc: Her Outfits, Her Armor] (in French). Leroux. OCLC 743097789.
- Michaud-Fréjaville, Françoise (2007). "Un habit "déshonnête": réflexions sur Jeanne d'Arc et l'habit d'homme à la lumière de l'histoire du genre". Francia (in French). 34/1. Ostfildern: 175–185. ISSN 0251-3609.
