= Full Personality Expression =

Crossdressing help/social group

- Formation: 1962
- Founder: Virginia Prince
- Headquarters: California
- Formerly called: The Hose & Heels Club

Full Personality Expression (FPE), also Phi Pi Epsilon, was formed in 1962 by Virginia Prince as an organization for heterosexual male crossdressers, based on her earlier Hose & Heels Club. The Alpha chapter was located in California, but new chapters appeared across the United States and Europe. Prince received some criticism for restricting the group's membership to heterosexual (and mostly married) crossdressers and policing of sexual content.

== Background ==
Formed in 1962 by Virginia Prince as an organization for heterosexual male crossdressers, it was based on her earlier Hose & Heels Club which had been located in Los Angeles. It was renamed in 1976, alongside merging with Carol Beecroft's Mademoiselle Sorority (aka. Mamselle), to Tri-Ess (Society for the Second Self).

According to Prince, it was the oldest known transvestite organisation and was formed from the subscribers to her magazine Transvestia. The initials FP were taken from Prince's blend word femmepersonator for the target audience of the magazine (since she believed that the word transvestite had been given negative connotations by drag queens and fetishists).

== Chapters ==
The Alpha chapter was located in California. Another chapter was located in Boston, and there were likely many more across the United States. In 1964 members financially supported the legal fees for John Miller (also known as Joan Miller), who was on FPE's council, with a $300 donation.

The British wing of FPE, The Beaumont Society, was co-founded in 1966 by Alga Campbell, Alice Purnell and others.

Full Personality Expression – Northern Europe (FPE-NE) was founded on 17 November 1966 by Anette Hall, a previous member of FPE. Its activities covered Sweden, Denmark, Norway, Finland and Iceland, with regional boards that became independent in 1982. From the late 1980s, there were disagreements among the members about the association's direction, which led to the formation of TiD (Transvestite Association in Denmark) in 1994 (which changed its name to Transpersoners i Denmark in 2017 and is still active), and FPE-N (Full Personality Expression – Norway (no), since renamed to FTP-N) in 2000. FPE-NE is thought to have ceased activities by the end of 2002, although it never formally dissolved.

== Criticism ==
Prince received some criticism for restricting the group's membership to heterosexual (and mostly married) crossdressers and policing of sexual content. Letters in The Transvestite note the competition between FPE and the Empathy club, whose magazines "each cut the other down". Empathy Magazine wrote: "If a pair of panties is the only article of apparel you happen to enjoy wearing I am not going to tell you that you cannot be a part of my club because you are a deviate or just a plain fetishist, not a true transvestite as my Competitor, Charles Prince might say."

== Legacy ==
Historian Emily Cousens has discussed the impact that the concept of Full Personality Expression had on trans communities in the 1970s, citing the view that in FPE "androgyny [w]as a combination of gendered traits". This was expressed through graphic design with logos featuring both feminine and masculine motifs combined. Cousens has also argued that FPE was "ideological justification for the vicious distinguishment between politically correct forms of gender variance (transvestism) and more deviant transfeminine embodiments (transsexualism)".
