= Virginia Prince =

American transgender activist (1912–2009)

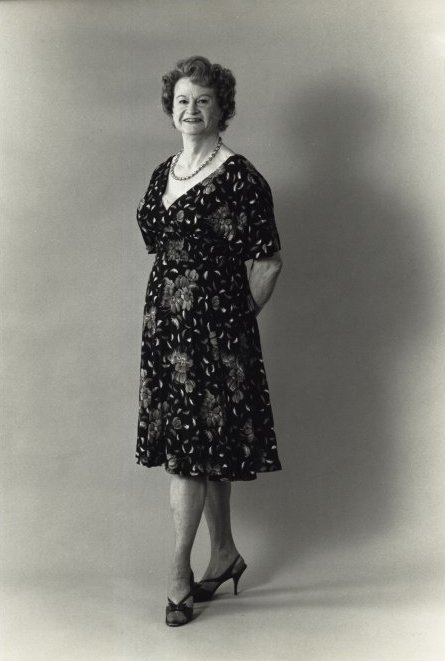
- Born: November 23, 1912; Los Angeles, California, U.S.
- Died: May 2, 2009 (aged 96); Los Angeles, California, U.S.
- Education: Pomona College (BA); University of California, San Francisco (PhD)
- Known for: Transgender activist, publisher of Transvestia, founder of Society for the Second Self

Virginia Charles Prince (November 23, 1912 – May 2, 2009) was an American transgender woman and transgender activist. She published Transvestia magazine, and started Full Personality Expression, which later became Tri-Ess, for male heterosexual cross-dressers.

== Early life ==
Prince was born on November 23, 1912, in Los Angeles, California, to a Protestant family. She was assigned male at birth. At around the age of twelve Prince began cross-dressing, first using her mother's clothes. During her time in high school Prince began cross-dressing more frequently and found herself passing as a girl in public. This came to a crux when Virginia, at the age of 18, went to a church Halloween party—not only in a woman's outfit but indeed passing as a woman—and won first prize. This marked "the first occasion in which [Prince] willingly appeared before others as a girl". The daughter of a surgeon father and a mother who worked in real estate investment, Prince's early life was one of privilege, with a family that was in her words "socially prominent".

== Education and transition period ==
Prince enrolled at Pomona College in Claremont, California, in 1931. She joined a fraternity and graduated in 1935 with a degree in chemistry.

Prince was not as open with her transvestism as she became in later life. However it was thanks to a psychiatrist she consulted at age 30 that she began to live a more comfortable, open lifestyle. Despite having been previously diagnosed with an unresolved Oedipus complex, Prince confided to her doctor, Karl Bowman, about her inclination of crossdressing, who in return advised her to "learn to accept [her]self... and enjoy it." Prince credits this psychiatrist, who reminded her that there are many others that live a similar lifestyle, with Transvestia's overarching, recurring theme of self-acceptance.

Prince gained her PhD in pharmacology in 1939 from the University of California, San Francisco. This was also around the time that she met Dorothy Shepherd (March 30, 1909 - May 13, 1985) whom she would marry and with whom she would have a son, Brent Lowman (July 1, 1946 - October 1976). The two were married on August 16, 1941, in Los Angeles, yet their marriage, according to Prince, "failed because of [her] transvestism". In July 1951, the two divorced. The news that Prince was served with divorce papers due to her transvestism came as a shock to her family who threatened to disown her both "financially and socially" if she could not keep the news from leaking to the media, which it ultimately did.

After her marriage ended, Prince returned to the University of California, San Francisco and began working as a research assistant and lecturer in pharmacology. During this time, Prince took advantage of the university's small collection of medical literature on transvestism. This was also around the time that Prince began using the name Charles Prince, a name used in order to hide her civil identity. The name stems from her father's first name, Charles, and her address on Prince Street. The exact time at which Prince took on the name Virginia is unclear, however one of her earliest known writings, the article "Homosexuality, Transvestism and Transsexualism: Reflections on Their Etiology and Difference" published in 1957, is credited to "C.V. Prince".

== Transvestia magazine ==
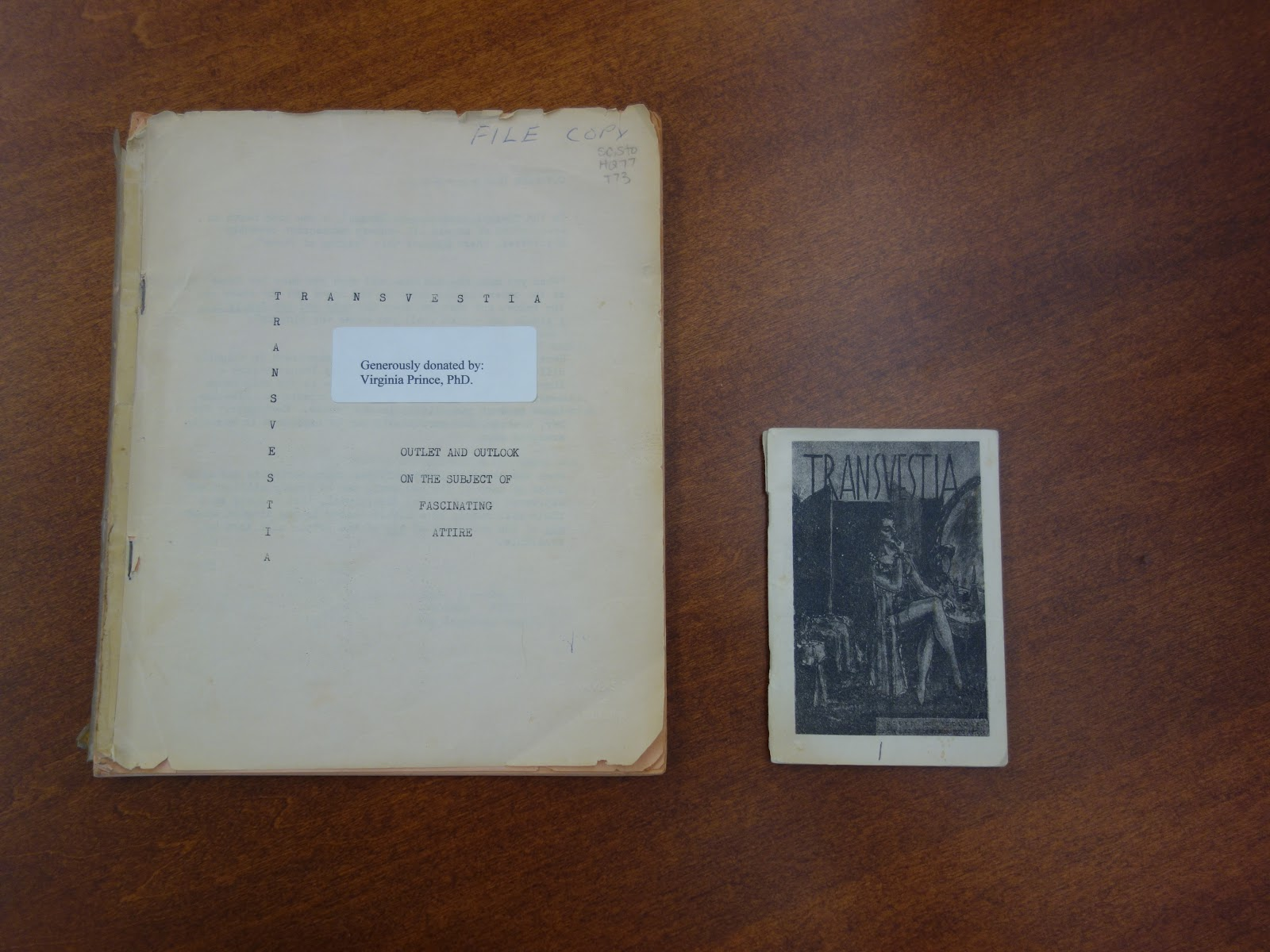
For the sake of concealability, the first two issues of Transvestia were printed on pamphlets that could be hidden within the palm of one's hand, or one's pocket.

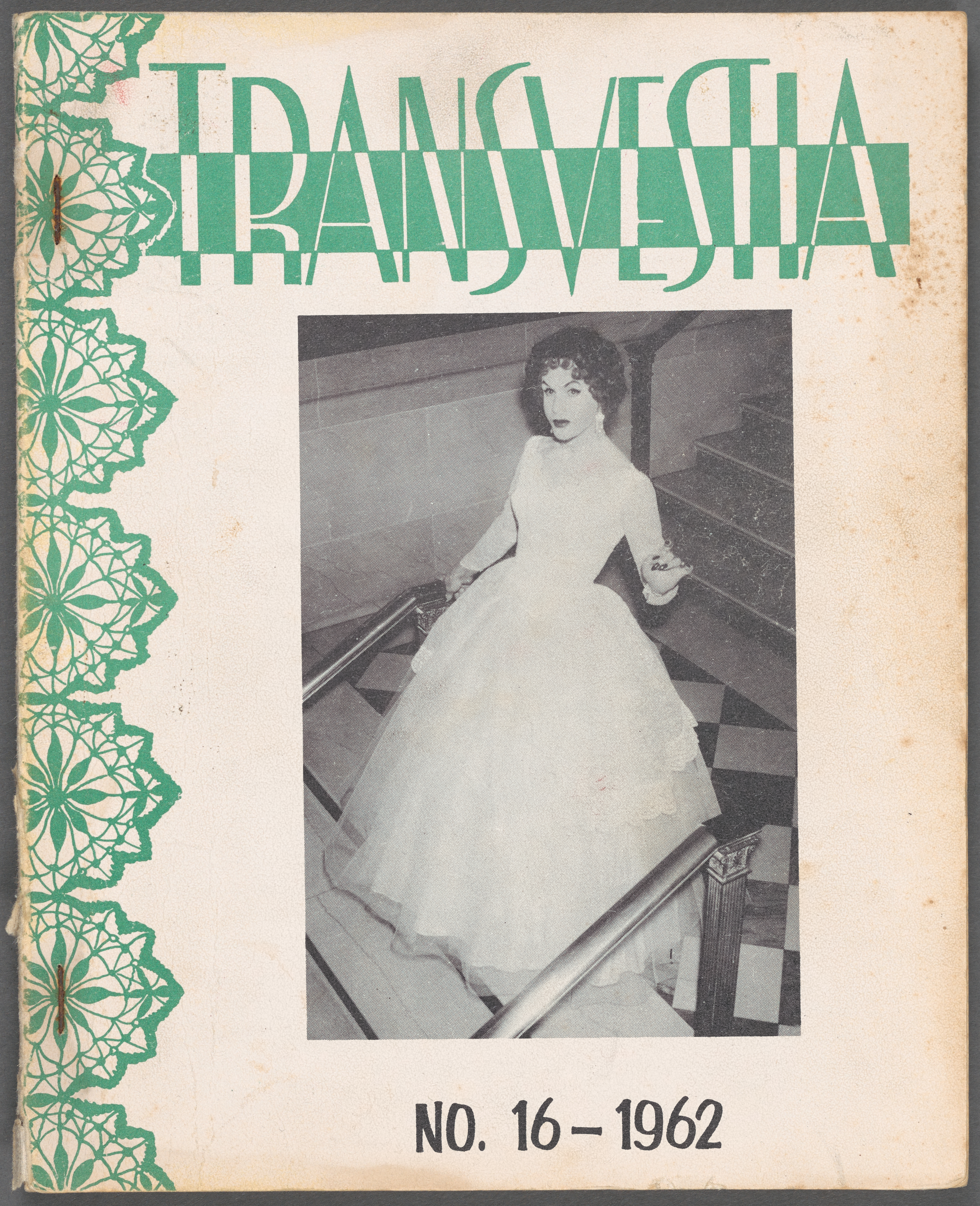
Front cover of Transvestia, issue 16, from 1962.

In 1960, the first issue of Prince's magazine Transvestia was published. Prince acquired the means to fund the publication after assembling a list of 25 acquaintances, each of whom were willing to donate four dollars to her start-up. Working with one hundred dollars, Prince then launched her first issue, published by her own Chevalier Publications, and sold it by subscription and through adult bookstores.

Transvestia was published bi-monthly by Prince between the years of 1960 and 1980, with a total of 100 issues being created. The subsequent 11 issues were edited and published by Carol Beecroft (the co-founder of Chevalier publications) until 1986. In 1963, the inside jacket of the magazine stated the publication as "dedicated to the needs of the sexually normal individual who has discovered the existance [sic] of his or her 'other side' and seeks to express it." Rather than relying on a team of professional authors, this magazine was to be "written by... the readers" with the editor's job to be organizing and categorizing these submissions as appropriate.

With a readership of mostly white, middle-to-professional-class crossdressers, the magazine offered, among other things, dozens of published life stories and letters contributed by other crossdressers. Over the years, the publication also gained several international subscribers, notably from England, Scandinavia and Australia. Prince herself, wrote an autobiographical article for the magazine's one-hundredth issue in 1979. This final issue edited by Virginia Prince, was unusual among Transvestia issues as it was solely an autobiographical account of Virginia's life, in which she recounted her early experiences with crossdressing, her divorce, and her work creating and maintaining Transvestia.

The magazine operated on three core objectives:

1. To provide expression for those interested in the subjects of unusual dress and fashion.
2. To provide information to those who, through ignorance, condemn that which they don't understand.
3. To provide education for those who see evil when none exists.

These three objectives—education, entertainment, and expression—were promoted in order to "help... readers achieve understanding, self-acceptance, [and] peace of mind". Transvestia was primarily a story driven magazine, however every issue contained a "person to person" section, in which ads for meeting others and businesses advertising transgender friendly services would be printed. This section also included a goods and services for sale section, as well as a trade and rent section.

The magazine's others sections included:

- Stories (true and fictional).
- Articles (medical, psychological, or personal opinion about any phase of transvestism).
- A question box (questions from readers that warrant a reply or further discussion).
- A wives section (in which spouses were encouraged to contribute opinions on transvestism for the general enlightenment of all).
- Letters to the editor (questions, comments, criticisms and compliments).
- General (poems, humor, news. They were typically short notes to fill sections of pages or break up longer articles).

Tranvestia was, in essence, an early example of a crowd-sourced publication.

Although Transvestia was published for 20 years, it was not originally a successful venture. Virginia Prince recounts in her autobiographical issue that originally the cost of production was too high to be sustainable, due to its having been printed on mimeograph paper. Ultimately it was not until Prince "found an offset printer" and gathered more subscribers that Transvestia became a success.

Transvestia's audience consisted largely of men who were interested in feminine apparel, because their desires to express themselves were frowned upon by the rest of society. While Transvestia was a magazine for crossdressers in general, it was mainly directed at men (as women who cross-dressed were not as marginalized by society during the 1960s). A complete run of Transvestia, both physical and digital copies, is in the Transgender Archives at the University of Victoria in British Columbia, Canada.

== Trans terminology, crossdresser identity and controversy ==
Through many of her writings, Prince has been considered a major pioneer of the transgender community. Her long history of literature surrounding issues of crossdressing and transvestism was rooted in her desire to fight against those who disagreed with liberal sexual ideology. Notably, in her 1967 "The Expression of Femininity in the Male" (under the pen name "Virginia Bruce"), Prince discusses the supposed psychiatric links between cross-dressing and sexual deviation that were commonly believed in at the time. Prince firmly rejected these associations, and was also strongly opposed to the notion that true transvestites are psychiatrically disturbed.

In other works, Prince also helped popularize the term 'transgender', and erroneously asserted that she coined "transgenderist" and "transgenderism", words which she meant to be understood as describing people who live as full-time women, but have no intention of having genital surgery. Prince also consistently argued that transvestism is very firmly related to gender, as opposed to sex or sexuality. Her use of the term "femmiphile" related to the belief that the term "transvestite" had been corrupted, intending to underline the distinction between heterosexual crossdressers, who act because of their love of the feminine, and the homosexuals or transsexuals who may cross-dress. Although Prince identified with the concept of androgyny (stating in her autobiographical 100th issue that she could "do [her] own thing whichever it is"), she preferred to identify as Gynandrous. This, she explained, is because although 'Charles' still resides within her, "the feminine is more important than the masculine." Prince's idea of a "true transvestite" was clearly distinguished from both the homosexual and the transsexual, claiming that true transvestites are "exclusively heterosexual... The transvestite values his male organs, enjoys using them and does not desire them removed."

By the early 1970s, Prince and her approaches to crossdressing and transvestism were starting to gain criticism from transvestites and transsexuals, as well as sections of the gay and women's movements of the time. Controversy and criticism has arisen based on Prince's support for conventional societal norms, such as marriage and the traditional family model, as well as the portrayal of traditional gender stereotypes. Her attempts to exclude transsexuals, homosexuals, or fetishists from her normalization efforts of the practice of transvestism have also drawn much criticism.

Prince died in her hometown of Los Angeles on May 2, 2009.

== Archival collections ==
The personal and professional papers of Virginia Prince are preserved at the University of Victoria and at California State University, Northridge.
