= Zoya Smirnow =

Zoya Smirnowa (1897 – after 1916) (also called Zoya Smirnova) was a Russian woman who fought during World War I disguised as a man. She and 11 other schoolmates disguised themselves as men so that they could fight in the war. Smirnowa was 16 when she enlisted; two of the women were as young as 14. They participated in the defense of Galicia and the Carpathians. Smirnowa became a representative of the group when she recounted their story to the English press.

As Smirnowa recounted to the newspapers, the girls left their Moscow school without informing anyone on the eighth day of mobilisation at the end of July 1914. They travelled to Lviv where they dressed as men and enlisted in the army posing as men, aided by a group of young (male) soldiers they had befriended on their journey. When the first bombs fell on their position, they cried out, as did many of the men. One girl, Zina Morozov, was killed in the Carpathians when a bomb fell at her feet. She was buried by her friends. Two other girls were subsequently wounded. Smirnowa herself was wounded twice; the second wound required her to be held in hospital. Upon her eventual release from hospital, she could not locate her former unit, and, in distress, she wept - upon which her gender was discovered.

The group of young women, including Smirnowa, fought together for fourteen months. Smirnowa was awarded a St George's Cross for her bravery.

Smirnowa's story was retold in Magnus Hirschfeld's The Sexual History of the World War (1930), a book that was later banned and burned during the Third Reich.
