= International Foundation for Gender Education =

American transgender advocacy organization

International Foundation for Gender Education (IFGE) was an American non-profit transgender advocacy organization. The foundation was devoted to "overcoming the intolerance of transvestitism and transsexualism brought about by widespread ignorance."

== History ==
=== The Tiffany Club ===
The organization began as the Tiffany Club, a club for crossdressers and transsexuals in North Hampton, New Hampshire. The club was founded by Merissa Sherrill Lynn, and its first meeting was in 1978, at her home in North Hampton, New Hampshire. In September of 1985, the club officially incorporated as a 501(c)(3).

=== International Foundation for Gender Education ===
Lynn founded International Foundation for Gender Education (IFGE) in 1986 to publish the club's newsletter Transgender Tapestry, host conventions, and to educate the general public about transgender people. While the organization was initially a separate entity to the Tiffany Club, the decision was made in 1987 to merge the two in order for IFGE to obtain 501(c)(3) status. The Tiffany Club officially became IFGE in March of that year. As of 1996, IFGE was one of three national transgender organizations in the United States to have an actual office, and the only transgender organization in the country to have paid staff.

Lynn stated, "The crossdressing and transsexual phenomena have been an integral part of human experience as long as there has been a human experience. These phenomena have manifested themselves in every society and in every walk of life throughout history, and continue to affect the lives of vast numbers of people. Yet, as common as they are, ignorance of them, and the resulting intolerance and fear, continues to cost good people their happiness, their jobs, their families, and their lives. It costs society its neighbors, its friends, and its productive citizens."

In 1998, the organization almost closed its doors due to financial difficulties. Eventually, the organization would experience major difficulties in the late 2000s which have resulted in the presumed closure of the organization. Disagreement within management and improper restructuring appear to be the causes of said issues. This information comes from the blog of the former editor Dallas Denny.

== Functions ==
According to former editor Dallas Denny, IFGE provided the following services:

1. Annual conferences which allowed transgender individuals to commune and network to build community in-person.
2. Transgender Tapestry
3. A phone line and physical center were located in Massachusetts.
4. A bookstore which provided materials for the community.
5. The Winslow Street Fund created by Joni Chrissman

== Notable persons ==
=== Dallas Denny ===
Denny was editor for Transgender Tapestry, later leaving the organization to write for Chrysalis Quarterly.

=== Merissa Sherrill Lynn ===
Merissa Sherrill Lynn is the founder of IFGE. She was born in 1942 in New Hampshire and grew up there, later receiving her BA in Philosophy from her state's university in 1971 after military service in the early 1960s. IFGE was conceived when she opened her home to the transgender and cross dressing community. She also originated the organization's major publication. Her networking allowed for global education on gender variance. Lynn stepped down from director of the organization after a stroke in 1998. She died in 2017.

== Major publications ==
=== Transgender Tapestry ===
Transgender Tapestry "is a magazine by, for, and about all things trans, including crossdressing, transsexualism, intersexuality, FTM, MTF, butch, femme, drag kings and drag queens, androgyny, female and male impersonation, and more." It ran from 1979-2008, and offered up-to-date media on LGBTQ+ pop culture, specializing in transgender media. Transgender tapestry began as a newsletter called The TV-TS Tapestry by the Tiffany Club. After multiple name and publisher changes was finally called Transgender Tapestry.

=== Web site ===
IFGE has offered a Web site containing information for transgender people since 1998. The site was very heavily used by transgender people seeking information on the Internet in the late 1990s and early 2000s, with respondents to a 2002 survey identifying the site as the "best source on the internet," preferring the site to Google and Yahoo for trans-related information seeking.
