= Joan (collection) =

1998 fashion collection by Alexander McQueen

Excerpt of the finale from the runway show of Joan

Joan is the twelfth collection by British fashion designer Alexander McQueen, released for the Autumn/Winter 1998 season of his eponymous fashion house. Continuing McQueen's fascination with religion and violence, it was inspired by imagery of persecution, particularly the 1431 martyrdom of French Catholic saint Joan of Arc, who was burned at the stake. The collection's palette was mainly red, black, and silver; colours that evoked notions of warfare, death, blood, and flames. Many looks alluded to ecclesiastical garments and medieval armour, including several that mimicked chainmail and one ensemble featuring actual silver-plated armour pieces.

The runway show was staged on 25 February 1998 at Gatliff Road Warehouse in London. McQueen banned several tabloid journalists, one of whom responded with an angry editorial. Production was handled by McQueen's usual creative team. The set design for Joan was sparse and industrial: a dark room lit by metal lamps suspended over the runway. The 100-foot (30 m) runway was covered in black ash, and models entered through a black backdrop backlit in red. Ninety-one looks were presented, primarily womenswear with some menswear. (Note: For convenience, when referring to individual looks, this article uses the numbering from the Vogue retrospective of the collection. Their overview counts 82 looks, but contains some duplications and omissions that cause the count to be incorrect. Look numbers mentioned in this article have not been adjusted. 9 of the 91 looks were omitted from Vogue, as follows: a grey women's suit following Look 4; a grey men's suit following Look 10; a grey men's suit and turtleneck following Look 25; black men's suits following Looks 41, 46, and 58; a men's black leather coat with red tartan shirt following Look 60; a men's black jacket following Look 72; and a men's beaded red sweater following Look 81. Vogue uses the same image for Looks 20 and 28; the image is correct for the latter. The Style.com video omits Look 46 and the men's suit that follows it, cutting directly from Look 45 to 47.) The show concluded with model Svetlana wearing a red beaded dress that covered her face, swaying in a circle of flames.

Critical response to the clothing and the runway show for Joan was positive, and it is regarded as one of McQueen's most memorable shows. Academic analysis has focused on interpretation of the styling, the finale, and the meaning of several garments printed with a photograph of children. Several items from Joan have appeared in museum exhibitions, including Alexander McQueen: Savage Beauty and Lee Alexander McQueen: Mind, Mythos, Muse.

== Background ==
Every six months you do a show and get publicity and sell perfume. But it's between those six months when there [aren't] those shows that it deteriorates. No one in the fashion press or the buyers actually see the trauma you go through to get things done.

— Alexander McQueen, 2002, interview with Lauren Goldstein Crowe

British fashion designer Alexander McQueen was known throughout his nearly twenty-year career, spanning 1992–2010, for his imaginative, sometimes controversial designs. Over the course of his career, which lasted from 1992 until his death in 2010, he explored a broad range of ideas and themes, particularly sexuality, death, violence, romanticism, and historicism. The son of a London taxicab driver and a teacher, he grew up in one of the poorer neighbourhoods in London's East End before joining the fashion industry via a Savile Row apprenticeship. In the early stages of McQueen's career, journalists often framed him as a working-class trespasser in an industry that was seen as upper-class, which he found frustrating. McQueen identified with the persecuted and vulnerable, given his homosexuality and difficult upbringing.

McQueen's personal fixations were a throughline in his career, and he returned to certain ideas and visual motifs repeatedly. His fashion shows were theatrical to the point of being performance art. For example, in Untitled (Spring/Summer 1998), the show preceding Joan, McQueen had his models walk down a runway made of clear water tanks, then drenched them with artificial rain in the second half. Beginning with his graduation collection, Jack the Ripper Stalks His Victims (1992), McQueen appropriated photographs and integrated them into his work. He did so again in Dante (Autumn/Winter 1996), a collection that explored religious motivations for warfare. McQueen continued to explore religion until his final collection, Angels and Demons (Autumn/Winter 2010).

McQueen's collections were both historicist, in that he adapted historical narratives and concepts, and self-referential, in that he revisited and reworked ideas between collections. He played with notions of clothing as armour and vice versa, creating high fashion cuirasses sculpted for the female torso. Although McQueen primarily designed womenswear, he had featured some menswear in previous collections including The Hunger (Spring/Summer 1996) and Dante.

From October 1996 to October 2001, McQueen was – in addition to his responsibilities for his own label – head designer at French fashion house Givenchy. His time at Givenchy was fraught, primarily because of creative differences between him and the label; his early collections there were poorly received. McQueen resorted to smoking and drug use to deal with the pressure he felt to satisfy Givenchy management and the fashion press. He became overbearing and temperamental towards those around him, causing his friend Simon Costin to stop working with him before the release of Joan.

== Concept and collection ==
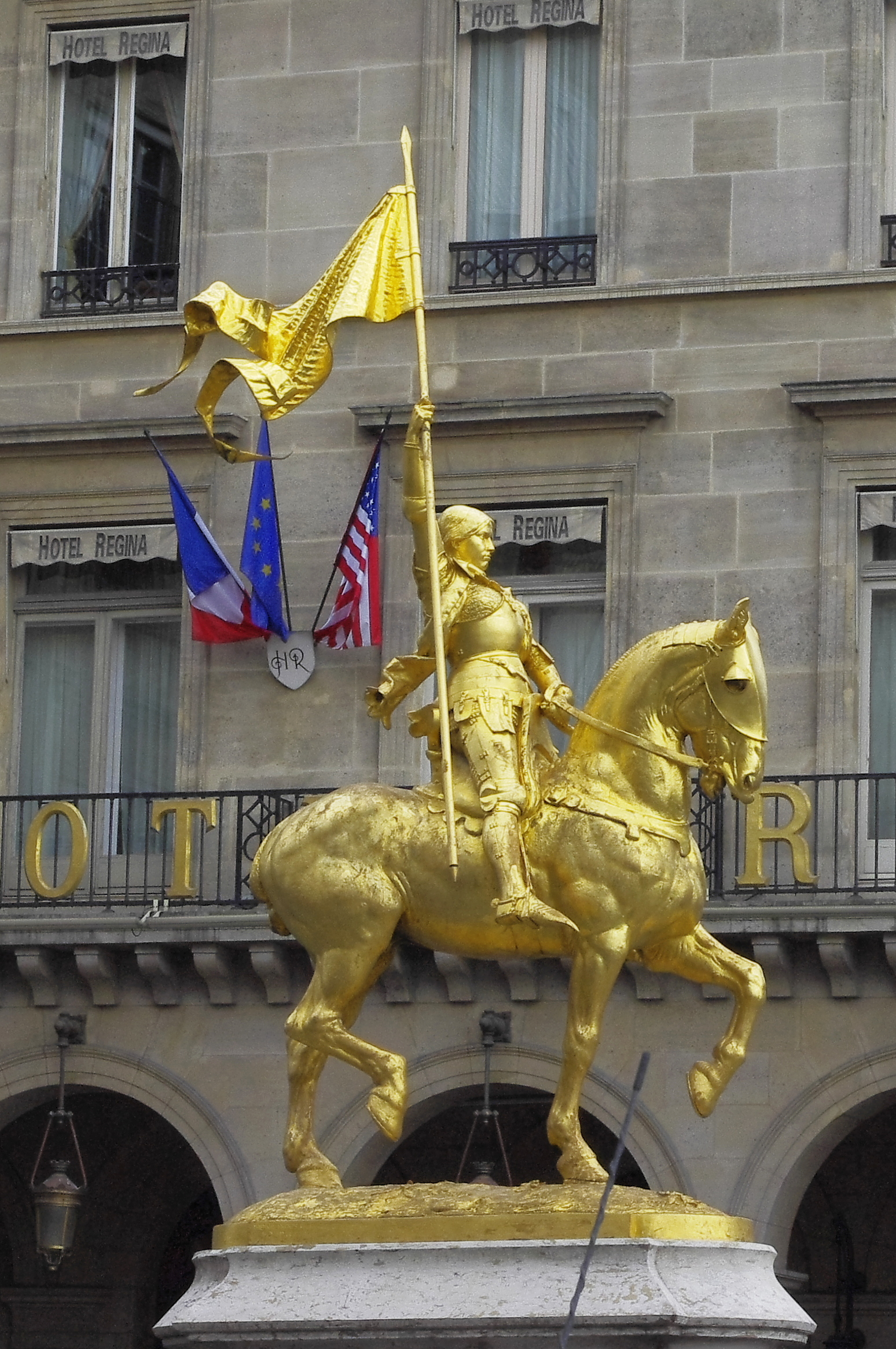
Jeanne d'Arc, 1874 sculpture, Emmanuel Frémiet

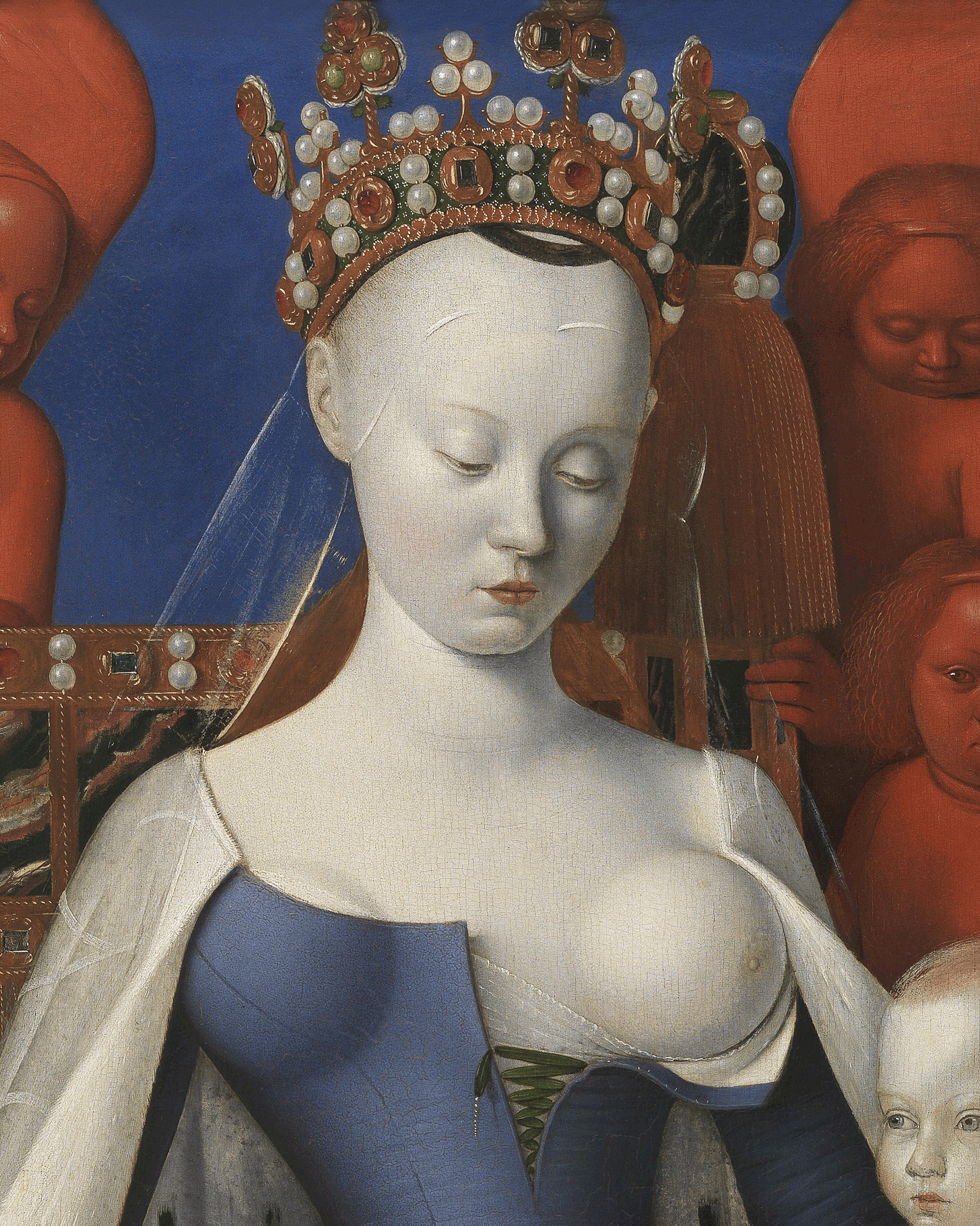
Agnès Sorel as Madonna Lactans, painted by Jean Fouquet, 1452

=== Inspiration ===
Joan (Autumn/Winter 1998) was the twelfth collection by McQueen for his eponymous fashion house. It was inspired by imagery of historical persecution, most significantly the 1431 martyrdom of French Catholic saint Joan of Arc, who was burned at the stake. During his tenure at Givenchy in Paris, McQueen frequently passed by a gilded statue of Joan on the Rue de Rivoli in Paris and became intrigued by her story. Curator Claire Wilcox suggested that Joan's androgyny and martyrdom "appealed to his sense of drama". McQueen archivist John Matheson argued that with Joan, McQueen was reflecting the new skills and techniques he was learning in the Givenchy haute couture workshop.

McQueen was also inspired by a 1452 painting of French royal mistress Agnès Sorel, which he used in altered form for the show's invitation. The painting depicts Sorel with pale skin and the artificially-plucked high hairline popular in the medieval period, a look that was echoed in the models' hairstyling in the runway show. Curator Kate Bethune suggested the hairstyles may also have been inspired by the look of the children in the horror film Village of the Damned (1960). Author Andrew Wilson pointed out that both Joan of Arc and Sorel died in service to Charles VII of France.

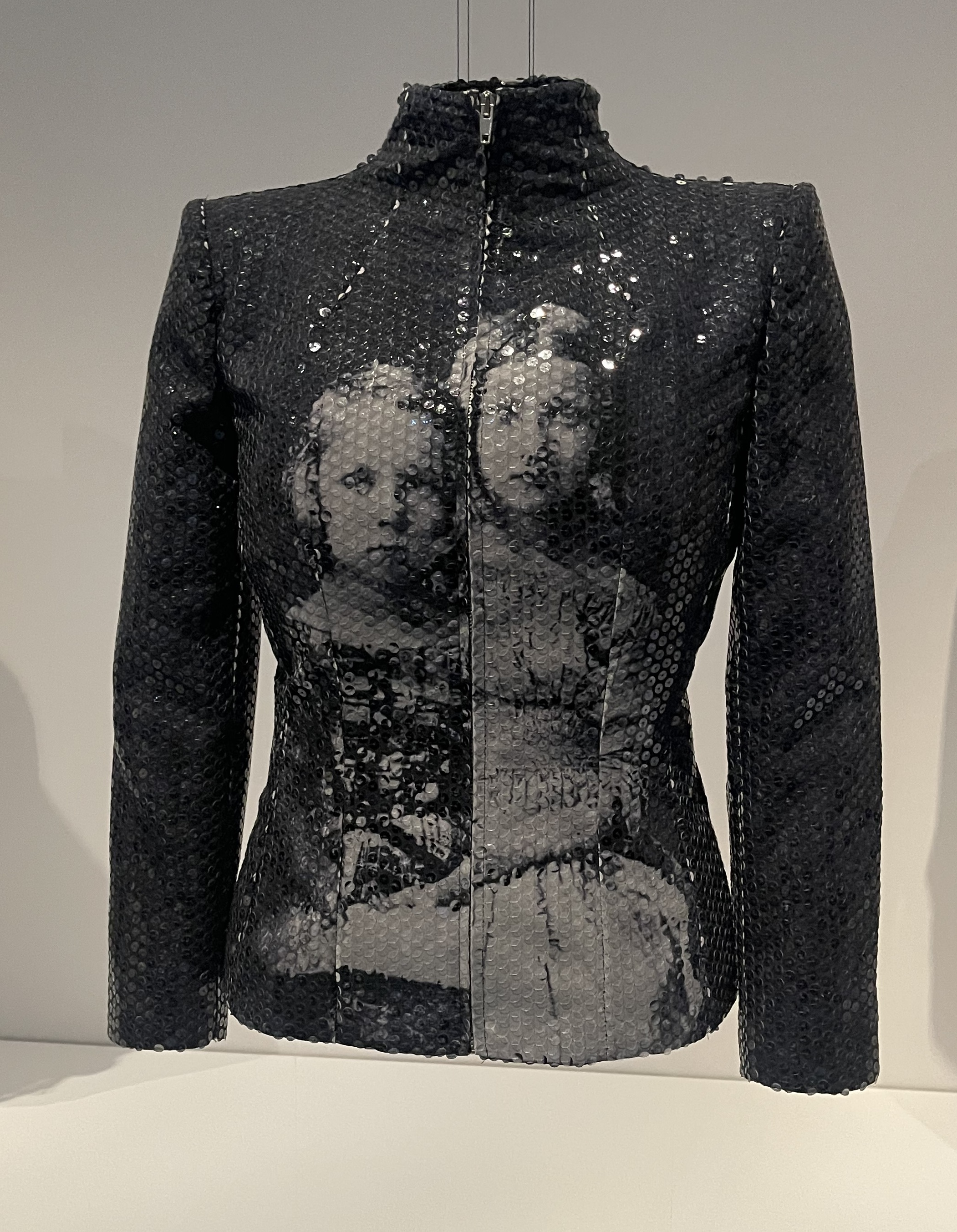
Sequined jacket with printed image of Victorian-era children; presented at Lee Alexander McQueen: Mind, Mythos, Muse (2023)

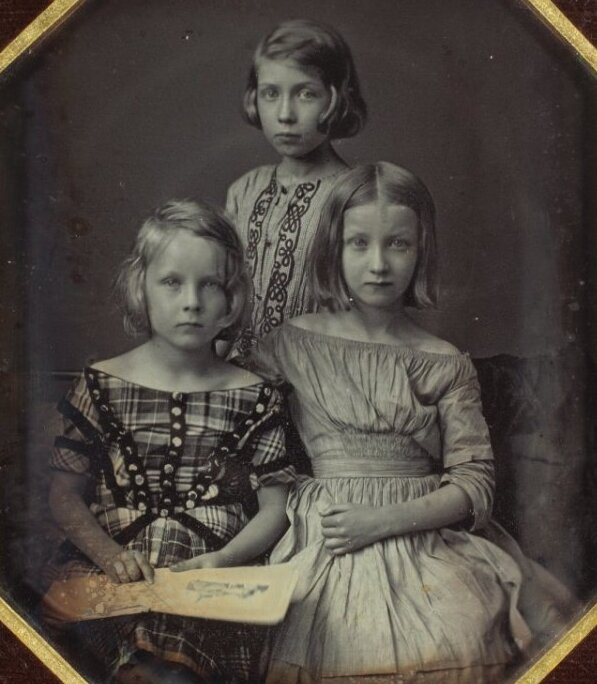
"Daguerreotype of three girls", Carl Gustav Oehme, 1845

Some jackets in the collection were printed with a black and white historical photograph of three young girls, using the same process that was employed for photo-printing in Dante. Many critics have suggested that these are images of children from the Russian imperial family, the Romanovs, and there is a widespread belief that the collection is drawing upon the killing of the family in 1918 as inspiration. Matheson discovered that the jackets actually feature an 1845 daguerreotype of three unnamed girls by German photographer Carl Gustav Oehme. (Note: It is unclear whether this misconception is McQueen's error, propagated through show notes or interviews, or an erroneous assumption made by later critics. At least two contemporary sources refer to the girls as Victorian. Theorist Caroline Evans states the children are the Romanovs as early as 2003, in her book Fashion at the Edge, but does not specify if this is her own conclusion or one she sourced from elsewhere. Regardless of its origin, much of the scholarly analysis of the collection rests on this incorrect assumption.) At least two contemporary articles correctly identify the girls as Victorian, including a 1998 interview with i-D in which McQueen discussed the symbolism behind the image. In it, McQueen described one of the men's coats printed with this image as multi-faceted in its references. For him, the clerical style of the coat juxtaposed with the young girls evoked "paedophilia by the church" as well as naivete and anti-authoritarianism; he did not mention the Romanovs.

To a lesser extent, McQueen drew on the 1567 beheading of Mary, Queen of Scots. The red, black, and yellow McQueen clan tartan, which McQueen had first used in the controversial Highland Rape (Autumn/Winter 1995), reappeared in Joan, referencing the history of Scotland.

=== Collection ===
The collection's palette was mainly red, black, and silver, colours which evoked notions of warfare, death, blood, and flames. Materials with strong textures featured heavily, including raffia cloth, leather, snakeskin, denim, sequins, and beadwork. Slits, sheer fabrics, and short hemlines created a dark sense of eroticism. McQueen's signature tailoring appeared in the form of frock coats and other jackets. Like Dante before it, Joan referenced cuts and fabrics that evoked the medieval period. There were design elements taken from medieval ecclesiastical dress including dresses shaped like monastic cowls and long, cassock-like coats that buttoned all down the front. Author Judith Watt felt that "boned, high-neck chiffon blouses [...] and slim maxi skirts" were references to the Edwardian era.

The clothing imitated armour of the medieval period in several ways, with dresses rendered in moulded leather or in lightweight metal mesh resembling chainmail armour. More literally, silversmith Sarah Harmarnee, who had previously contributed accessories to It's a Jungle Out There (Autumn/Winter 1997), created silver-plated armour pieces for the collection. Look 8 featured a model wearing armour that covered her head, shoulders, arms, and hands. Bethune felt it was a reference to Joan of Arc armoured for battle and possibly a nod to the 1995 Thierry Mugler design "Robot Couture".

== Runway show ==
=== Production details ===
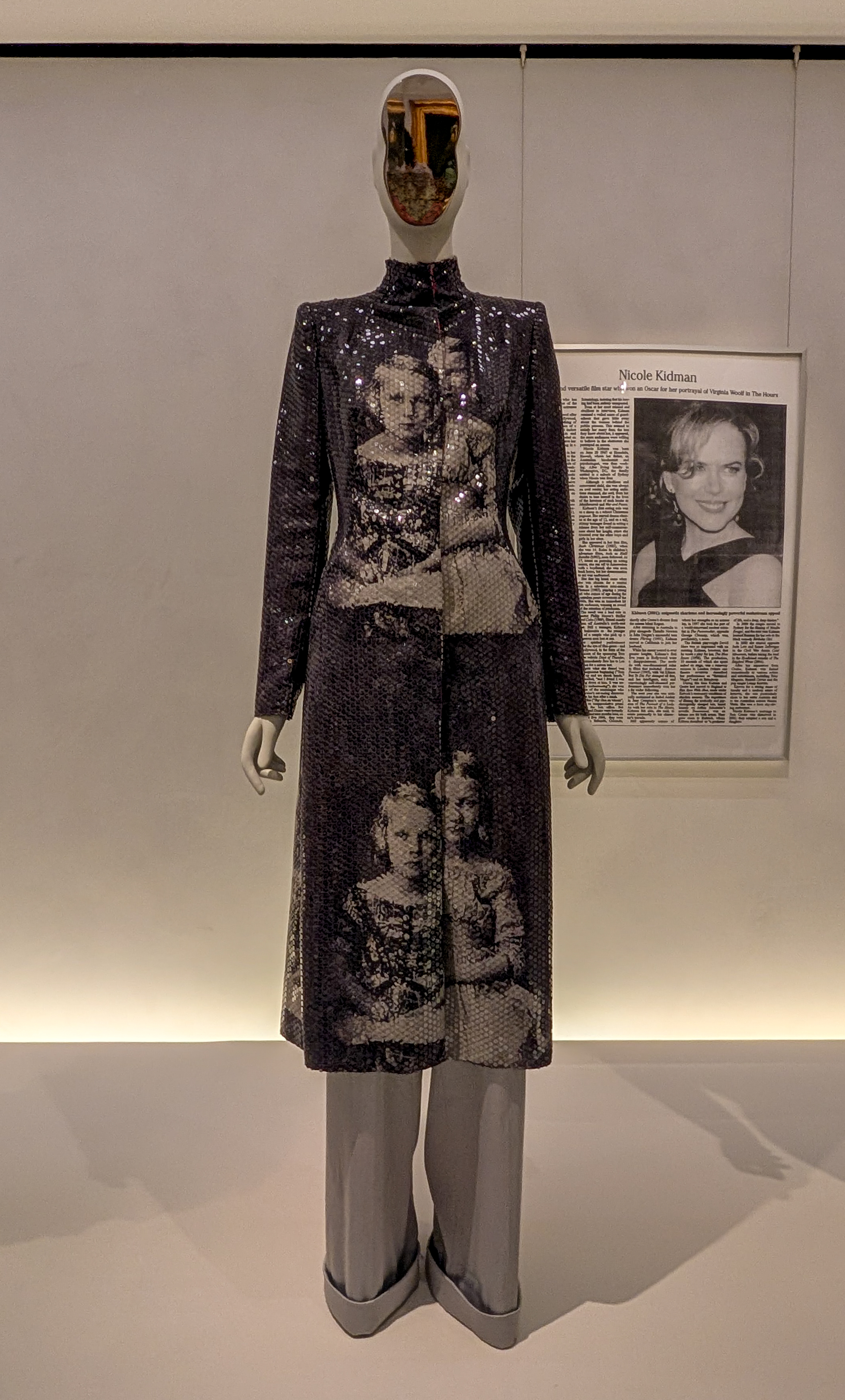
Men's jacket with Victorian children print, at Costume Art exhibition (2026)

The runway show for Joan was staged on 25 February 1998 at the Gatliff Road Warehouse in London; it was McQueen's second time presenting there. It was the final collection for London Fashion Week that season. According to Katy England, McQueen's assistant, McQueen and his team had intended to produce a much simpler show following the complicated aquatic set for Untitled. However, McQueen "got a bit carried away", and the show "turned into another huge production". The theatrical effects – custom contacts, wigs, and bald caps for some fifty models, plus pyrotechnics – were not cheap. McQueen later said "it was fucking the most expensive show I ever did", although he was not dissatisfied with the result, adding: "it's kind of good".

Gainsbury & Whiting oversaw production, and England dealt with overall styling. Hair for female models was styled by Guido Palau; Mira Chai Hyde handled male models. Val Garland was responsible for makeup. McQueen had worked with Garland before, but it was Palau's first McQueen show. The show was dedicated to model Annabelle Neilson, a friend and muse of McQueen. Well-known attendees included actress Kate Winslet; models Kate Moss and Shakira Caine; Keith Flint of music group The Prodigy; Meg Mathews, then-wife of musician Noel Gallagher; and Pauline Prescott, wife of then-Deputy Prime Minister John Prescott.

McQueen caused an upset by banning several media outlets, including The Sun and GMTV, from attending the runway show for Joan, purportedly because they played to "the wrong sort of audience". Irate, Sun columnist Jane Moore accused McQueen of rank hypocrisy, pointing out his working-class origins and complaining that he was "so far up his own bottom, I'm surprised he can still see daylight". Staff from The Dallas Morning News were turned away at the door by McQueen's public relations personnel due to lack of seats. Other fashion journalists also complained of poor treatment. Anna Harvey, deputy editor of British Vogue, and Alexandra Shulman, editor of Vogue, felt the show was a "complete disgrace" in this respect. Hilary Alexander agreed, calling the show the "nadir" of Fashion Week. She was upset that guests were expected to enter the show via a "small entrance in pitch darkness" and that following the show, bouncers refused to let photographers exit the venue for unexplained reasons. She criticised the "bizarre little episode" but felt she should not have been surprised given McQueen's treatment of GMTV.

=== Catwalk presentation ===
The set design for Joan was sparse and industrial: a dark room lit by metal lamps suspended over the runway as well as by smaller lights in the floor. The 100-foot (30 m) runway was covered in black ashes, and models entered through a black backdrop backlit in red. The sound of fire crackling and burning played over the start of the show, then transitioned into a selection of disco tracks.

Styling for all models, male and female, was deliberately androgynous in a reference to Joan of Arc's cross-dressing. Hair for women was styled in one of two modes. Some models wore blond wigs left loose, sometimes with artificially high hairlines in the medieval style. Others wore bald caps, which were styled partially or fully bald, with or without thin coiled braids. Models wore thick white face make-up that concealed their eyebrows, red contact lenses, and red mascara. Wilcox called the styling "half medieval, half futuristic", while Wilson quoted Garland as calling it "Joan of Arc kidnapped by aliens".

Ninety-one looks were presented; primarily womenswear with some menswear. The show opened with looks primarily in grey and black, with muted burgundy notes. Red began to appear more brightly, and more frequently, as the show progressed; most of the final set of looks were monochromatic red. Look 78 featured a red lace long-sleeved mini dress with a long train; the fabric covered the model's entire face. Debra Shaw appeared in Look 81, a hooded dress of red snakeskin.

For the finale, Svetlana represented Joan of Arc, wearing a red beaded dress which covered her face. (Note: The final model is sometimes incorrectly reported as being Erin O'Connor, but backstage photographer Robert Fairer confirms that it was Svetlana.) She walked to the end of the darkened runway, where a circle of flames came up around her feet and she swayed within them, holding her arms out, until the fire went out and the lights dimmed. Following this, McQueen took his bow alongside stylist Katy England, while the Diana Ross song "Remember Me" played. His close-cropped hair was bleached white-blond, and like the models, he wore red contacts.

== Reception ==
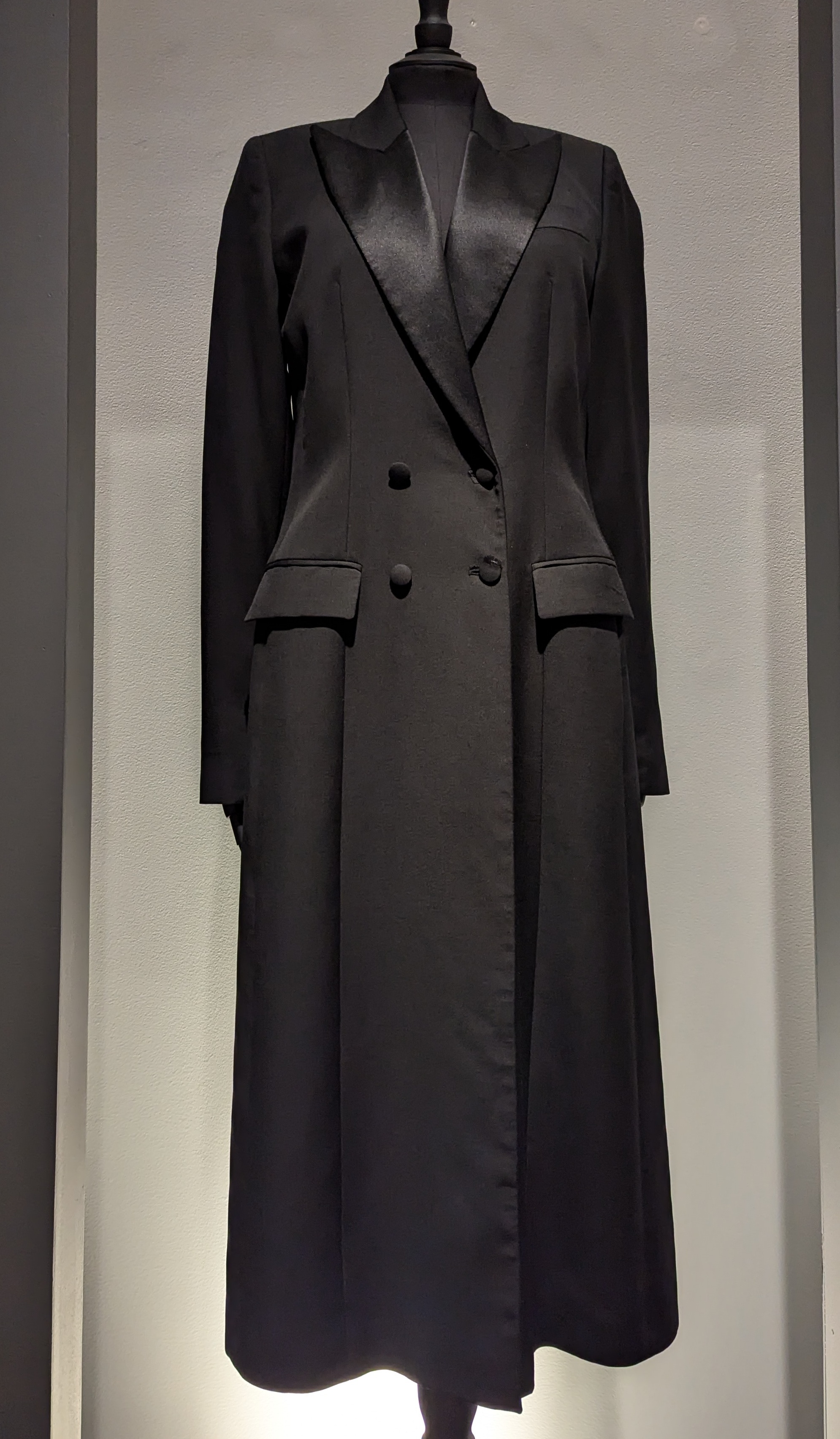
Tailored women's frock coat, presented at Lee Alexander McQueen & Ann Ray - Rendez-Vous (2024)

Reception to Joan was positive. Summarizing the critical consensus in retrospect, journalist Maureen Callahan reported that the show received a "rapturous reception". Avril Groom at The Scotsman called it the best show of that season's London Fashion Week. She credited the polish to McQueen's experience at Givenchy, as did Jane de Teliga of the Sydney Morning Herald. John Hoerner, chairman of the British Fashion Council, and Hilary Alexander of The Daily Telegraph each wrote that it was McQueen's best work to date. Alexander added that the collection "fairly scorched down the runway". Author Katherine Gleason wrote that "many in the press see signs of a new maturity"; reviewers who remarked in this vein included Suzy Menkes, Robert O'Byrne, and Avril Groom.

Reviewers were broadly positive about the designs from Joan. The tailored pieces drew particular attention as a showcase for McQueen's skills. John Davidson of The Herald wrote that the theme of Joan and her androgyny "allowed McQueen to express his brilliance as a tailor". Suzy Menkes, writing in the International Herald Tribune, felt that the collection had "given a fresh angle" to McQueen's signature items. Constance C. R. White at The New York Times highlighted one particular "bare-back dress [...] high on the neck in the front and scooped down over the shoulders, baring the model's back between two flanges of fabric that stood out like delicate bird's wings". Susannah Frankel, for The Guardian, felt that items in "black denim with red top stitching" were "clever" and would be replicated by other clothing brands. Grace Bradberry of The Times thought the garments printed with the photographs of children were among the highlights of the collection. Menkes felt the photo-printed items were "less assured".

Critics generally felt that McQueen had successfully balanced the medieval references so that they were noticeable but not overexaggerated. Groom appreciated that the clothing remained modern rather than looking like a costume. Frankel felt similarly, writing that the clothes were "challenging but never too gimmicky". Several reviewers noted the chain mail dresses as a point of interest. White was impressed by McQueen's ability to create a "celebratory collection" using Joan of Arc's tragic story as inspiration. On the other hand, Robert O'Byrne at The Irish Times was critical of what he saw as McQueen's attempt to demonstrate his "intellectual credentials", dismissing the theme as "little more than intermittent and inexplicable references to Joan of Arc".

McQueen's designs were notorious for being harsh and unwearable. Reviewers found this collection much more commercial, largely regarded as a positive step for McQueen. De Teliga wrote that the designs had "huge commercial potential", while Claudia Croft complimented the clothing for being wearable. The staff writer at Women's Wear Daily (WWD) described the clothing as unusually romantic for McQueen, while Davidson noted the surprising presence of "more delicate pieces". Although they enjoyed the collection in general, the WWD reviewer criticised the harem pants and corsets as unrealistic for the average consumer.

Some journalists had expected a runway show full of McQueen's usual gruesome flourishes, based on the theme, the invitation, and the set dressing; they were surprised to find that it was not especially macabre. Multiple critics considered the flaming finale to be a properly theatrical end for Fashion Week. Bradberry felt it might "sum up the whole late 1990s London thing 10 years from now". Several remarked upon the contrast of elements between the watery runway of Untitled and the fire used for Joan. The staff writer from WWD thought that the Joan finale lacked the impact of the rainstorm that finished Untitled but considered the collection stronger.

In retrospect, the collection is well-regarded. Callahan considered the collection an expression of McQueen's "ongoing martyr complex" and wrote that "the more he abused himself, the better his work became". Writer Chloe Fox called the finale "spectacular". Judith Watt felt that it was the end of the press dismissing McQueen as a low-class intruder into the high-class fashion scene and considered the collection a demonstration of McQueen's "informed mind". In Gods and Kings, Dana Thomas was effusive about the collection, calling the clothing "handsome, sensual, and absolutely wearable" despite the "dark and somewhat frightening" theatrics of the runway show. Dazed magazine called it one of McQueen's "most visually arresting shows in terms of its beauty looks".

== Analysis ==
McQueen was long fascinated by the conjunction of religion and female suffering. Theorist Mélissa Diaby Savané cited Joan as an example of how McQueen channelled his interest in religious suffering through a Romantic lens that led him to turn prosaic fashion shows into performance art. Dress historian Edwina Ehrman compared Joan to McQueen's Autumn/Winter 1999 collection for Givenchy, the latter of which was inspired by the 1833 painting The Execution of Lady Jane Grey. Both collections "explore female martyrdom". In a 2023 essay about the enduring influence Joan of Arc has had in fashion, writer Rosalind Jana identified Joan as the industry's "best and most unsettling interpretation of the saint", owing to McQueen's admiration for her conviction and martyrdom and the bleakness with which he presented his image of her.

When he asked me to make the suit, I was immediately drawn into the character. Joan of Arc was a figure that appealed to me because I've always been interested in warrior women. I don't see suits of armor as a symbol of aggression, but of protection. I've always been obsessed with them, their construction and sculptural forms. Each part has its purpose.

— Sarah Harmarnee, quoted in Elle Brazil

The styling for the runway show has drawn critical attention for its juxtaposition of aggression and femininity, in the use of armour as well as in the styling of the models. One contemporary review called the chainmail items "an original play on the overworked theme". Curator Clare Phillips called the armour pieces "a dignified evocation of female power". Some writers have likened the models to "satanic serpents". In an essay about McQueen's use of make-up to subvert expectations of femininity, fashion theorist Janice Miller wrote that the look created a "cloned army of female warriors", making an "unforgiving, but striking, statement about feminine identity". She felt that it displayed McQueen's interest in the "inner lives" of women. Writing separately, Bethune concurred, arguing that the models "appeared aggressive and untouchable", and that their strength and sexuality "served as a counterpoint to the murder of innocents". Fashion historian Ingrid Loschek felt that the styling used "eroticism as a symbol of power", representing Joan as a soldier in an armoured minidress or "as a Greek warrior with half-bared breast". Savané suggested that the androgynous styling and use of armour exemplified McQueen's "ideal kind of woman", who is both "strong and threatening, vulnerable yet aggressive".

Much of the scholarly analysis of the collection rests on the incorrect assumption that the photos printed on several of the garments were of the Romanov children. Keith Lodwick, for example, asserted that the prints feature Grand Duchess Anastasia Romanov, who he calls a "revolutionary influence". Lodwick drew a line from these items to military-inspired jackets from The Girl Who Lived in the Tree (Autumn/Winter 2008), arguing that the latter were inspired by the "revolutionary atmosphere of Les Misérables". Susannah Brown, analysing the influence photography had on McQueen, suggested he often selected photographs that would be provocative or "prove a political point" and cited the images of the putative Romanov children as one example. Sociologist Henrique Grimaldi Figueredo wrote that the collection includes "the reproduction of the murder photographs of the [Romanov] children" as an example of the kind of "fantastic trauma" McQueen explores.

=== Finale ===
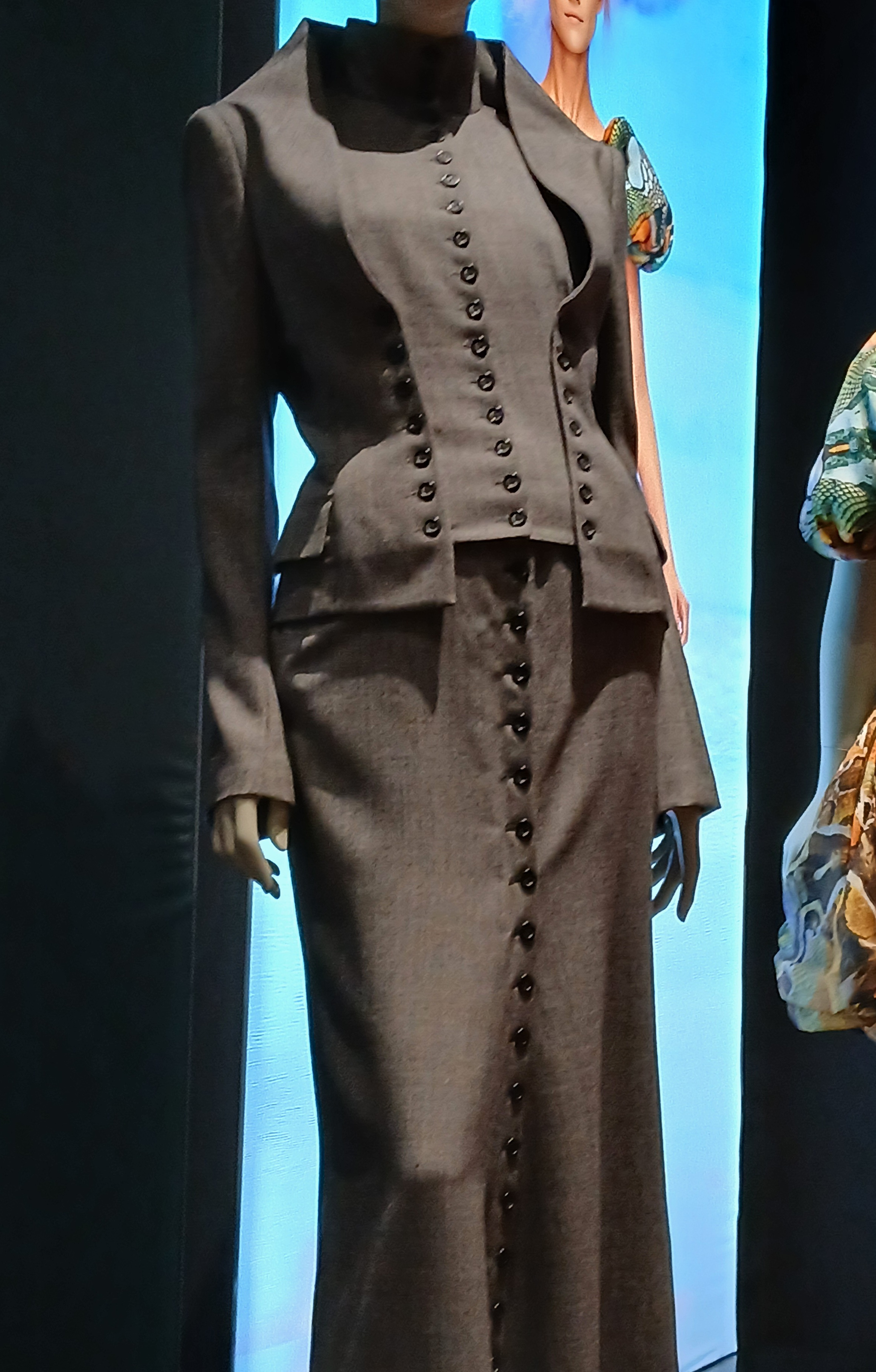
Skirt suit from Joan at the exhibit accompanying the House of McQueen play, 2025

The finale has also drawn extensive commentary. Bethune believed the finale may have been partly inspired by a Richard Avedon photograph from a series called In Memory of the Late Mr and Mrs Comfort, published in The New Yorker in November 1995. One image in the series depicts a woman in red, her face covered, surrounded by fire. Fashion theorist Caroline Evans argued that the increasingly-theatrical fashion shows of the late 1990s served as "phantasmagoria": dramatic displays that existed to conceal the underlying "working mechanisms of capitalist production". She cited the flaming finale of Joan as an example.

In an analysis of McQueen's Gothic leanings, Catherine Spooner pinpointed the "revenant past" as "the defining feature of the Gothic" and argued that McQueen "constructs the past as Gothic trauma" through his designs. She identified Joan and Dante as containing depictions of "historic trauma" via the "screen-printed photographs of the murdered Romanov children and of the Vietnam War" that appeared in these respective collections. Spooner further considered the finale of Joan to be a Gothic reference to two different "persecuted teenager[s] with supernatural powers": the flaming circle explicitly references the burning of Joan of Arc, and less obviously, the beaded red dress resembled the blood-covered prom dress from the pivotal scene of the film Carrie (1976).

The ambiguous meaning of the finale has been the subject of much debate. For Spooner, it is unclear whether the woman from the Joan finale is "achieving heavenly transcendence or undergoing a demonic resurrection". Bethune, too, saw the finale as evidence of violence: for her, the red dress represented "flayed flesh", and the dangling beads, "dripping blood". Although Wilcox felt the finale reflected the cruelty of Joan's death, she felt the visual hinted at "her resurrection as martyr" and her sainthood. Andrew Wilson felt the woman in the finale represented the "McQueen everywoman: resilient, strong, a survivor of unknown horrors". Grimaldi Figueredo argued that the finale of Joan incorporated both sacred and profane imagery and cites it as an example of the aesthetic of abjection in McQueen's work.

== Legacy ==
Joan.

Deep inside of me I have no regrets of the way I portray myself to the General Public.

I will face fear head on if necessary, but will run from a fight if persuaded.

The fire in my soul is for the love of one Man, but I do not forget my women whom I adore as they burn daily from Cheshire to Gloucester.

— Alexander McQueen, April 1998, handwritten letter printed in The Face

Nick Knight photographed McQueen in hair and make-up similar to that used in this show for the April 1998 issue of The Face magazine. The photos were accompanied by a handwritten letter from McQueen explaining the imagery and addressed to Joan of Arc. (Note: Although the magazine came out after the show, the photoshoot was completed well beforehand.) Tim Walker photographed two looks from the collection for British Vogue, including a dress in the red McQueen tartan. In October 2023, actress Taylor Russell was photographed in a pair of hooded, beaded fringe dresses – one in black, one in red – designed by Sarah Burton for the Alexander McQueen brand, inspired by the final dress from Joan.

American singer Lady Gaga wore the red lace dress from Look 78 to the 2009 MTV Video Music Awards, adding a tall crown of matching lace by Haus of Gaga to the look. Following her controversial performance of "Paparazzi", which ended with her apparently lifeless, hanging by the wrist and smeared with blood, she changed into the McQueen ensemble to accept the Best New Artist award. She later explained that the dress was "meant to be a continuation of the VMA performance. So after ... the princess had been murdered by the paparazzi, the red lace was meant to symbolize sort of my eternal martyrdom." It is recalled as one of Gaga's most memorable looks. Nina Bo'nina Brown wore a homemade version of the red lace dress for a performance on a Lady Gaga-themed episode of RuPaul's Drag Race in 2017. Gaga referenced the look during her 2025 Mayhem Ball concert tour. For her performance of "Poker Face", she is confronted by a doppelgänger of herself wearing a white dress that resembles the red original. Livia Caligor of W magazine wrote that with this callback, Gaga appeared to be "situat[ing] her early fame within the mythos of self-sacrifice".

=== Ownership and exhibitions ===
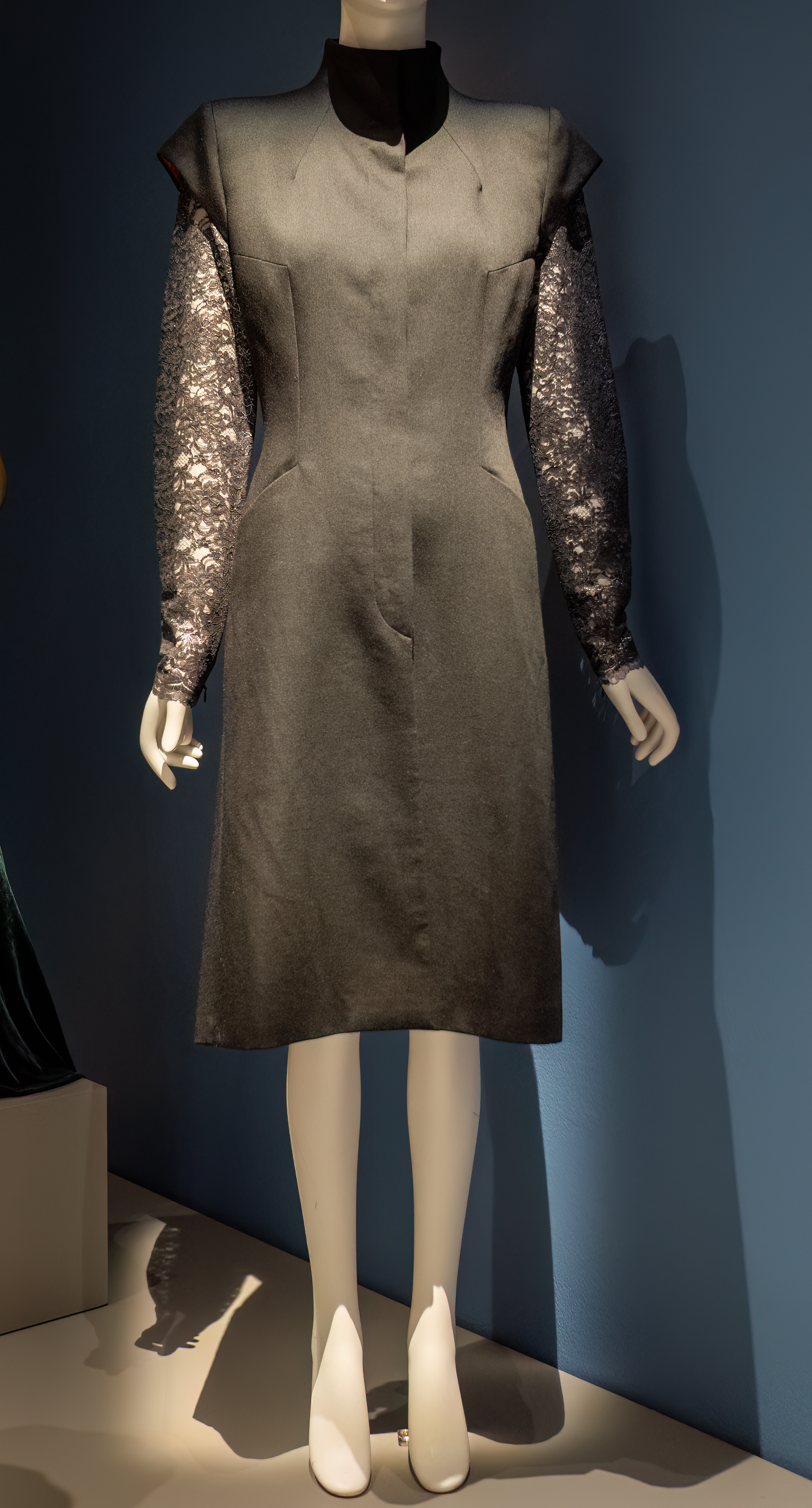
Dress from Joan at Dress, Dreams, and Desires exhibition at The Museum at FIT (2025)

The Metropolitan Museum of Art in New York City owns several items from Joan, including the long coat from Look 4, the buttoned jacket and beaded skirt from Look 42, the billowy black jacket and red and black striped pants from Look 74, and one unspecified ensemble. The Victoria and Albert Museum of London owns the red and black striped jacket from Look 76. The National Gallery of Victoria (NGV) in Australia owns several items from Joan, including Look 11, a grey sheath dress, and Look 55, a red beaded dress.

Several items from Joan appeared in the retrospective exhibit Alexander McQueen: Savage Beauty: the armour from Look 8, the black jacket from Look 42, and the red beaded dress from Look 82, the finale. A sequined jacket with a black-and-white printed image of Victorian era children from Joan appeared in the 2022 exhibition Lee Alexander McQueen: Mind, Mythos, Muse.

In 2017, Shaun Leane auctioned a number of pieces he had created for the house at Sotheby's in New York, including a silver headdress from Joan which sold for an estimated $50,000.

== Bibliography ==
- Bolton, Andrew (2011). Alexander McQueen: Savage Beauty. New York City: Metropolitan Museum of Art. ISBN 978-1-58839-412-5. OCLC 687693871.
- Bolton, Andrew (2018). "III. Fashioning Devotion". Heavenly Bodies: Fashion and the Catholic Imagination. Vol. II. New York City: Metropolitan Museum of Art. ISBN 978-1-58839-645-7. Archived from the original on 22 April 2023.
- Callahan, Maureen (2014). Champagne Supernovas: Kate Moss, Marc Jacobs, Alexander McQueen, and the '90s Renegades Who Remade Fashion. New York City: Touchstone Books. ISBN 978-1-4516-4053-3.
- Crowe, Lauren Goldstein (2010). Isabella Blow: A Life in Fashion. New York City: Thomas Dunne Books. ISBN 978-1-4299-8538-3.
- Davisson, Amber L. (2013). Lady Gaga and the Remaking of Celebrity Culture. Jefferson, North Carolina: McFarland & Company. ISBN 978-1-4766-0376-6.
- Esguerra, Clarissa M.; Hansen, Michaela (2022). Lee Alexander McQueen: Mind, Mythos, Muse. New York City: Delmonico Books. ISBN 978-1-63681-018-8. OCLC 1289986708.
- Evans, Caroline (2003). Fashion at the Edge: Spectacle, Modernity and Deathliness. New Haven, Connecticut: Yale University Press. ISBN 978-0-300-10192-8.
- Fairer, Robert; Wilcox, Claire (2016). Alexander McQueen: Unseen. New Haven, Connecticut: Yale University Press. ISBN 978-0-300-22267-8. OCLC 946216643.
- Fox, Chloe (2012). Vogue On: Alexander McQueen. Vogue on Designers. London: Quadrille Publishing. ISBN 978-1849491136. OCLC 828766756.
- Frankel, Susannah (2001). Visionaries: Interviews With Fashion Designers. London: V&A Publications. ISBN 978-0-8109-6589-8.
- Friedman, John Block (2018). "Eyebrows, Hairlines, and 'Hairs Less in Sight': Female Depilation in Late Medieval Europe". In Netherton, Robin; Owen-Crocker, Gale R. (eds.). Medieval Clothing and Textiles. Vol. 14. Woodbridge, Suffolk: Boydell & Brewer. pp. 81–112.
- Gleason, Katherine (2012). Alexander McQueen: Evolution. New York City: Race Point Publishing. ISBN 978-1-61058-837-9. OCLC 783147416.
- Homer, Karen (2023). Little Book of Alexander McQueen: The Story of the Iconic Brand. London: Welbeck Publishing Group. ISBN 978-1-80279-270-6.
- Knox, Kristin (2010). Alexander McQueen: Genius of a Generation. London: A&C Black. ISBN 978-1-4081-3223-4. OCLC 794296806.
- Loschek, Ingrid (2009). When Clothes Become Fashion: Design and Innovation Systems. Oxford: Berg Publishers. ISBN 978-0-85785-144-4. Archived from the original on 5 January 2023.
- Mora, Juliana Luna; Berry, Jess (2 September 2022). "Creative Direction Succession in Luxury Fashion: The Illusion of Immortality at Chanel and Alexander McQueen". Luxury. 9 (2–3): 117–140. doi:10.1080/20511817.2022.2194039. ISSN 2051-1817.
- Steele, Valerie (2008). Gothic: Dark Glamour. New Haven, Connecticut: Yale University Press. ISBN 978-0-300-13694-4.
- Alexander McQueen Joan Collection Fall 1998 Full Runway Show – #TBT w/Tim Blanks. Style.com. 20 March 2014 – via YouTube.
- Alexander McQueen Joan of Arc Collection Fall/Winter 1998 – #TBT w/Tim Blanks. Style.com. 20 March 2014 – via YouTube.
- Thomas, Dana (2015). Gods and Kings: The Rise and Fall of Alexander McQueen and John Galliano. New York City: Penguin Publishing. ISBN 978-1-101-61795-3. OCLC 951153602.
- Watt, Judith (2012). Alexander McQueen: The Life and the Legacy. New York City: Harper Design. ISBN 978-1-84796-085-6. OCLC 892706946.
- Webb, Iain R. (2022). The Fashion Show: The Stories, Invites and Art of 300 Landmark Shows (2nd ed.). London: Welbeck. ISBN 978-1-80279-432-8.
- Wilcox, Claire, ed. (2015). Alexander McQueen. New York City: Abrams Books. ISBN 978-1-4197-1723-9. OCLC 891618596.
  - Bethune, Kate. "Encyclopedia of Collections". In Wilcox (2015), pp. 303–326.
  - Brown, Susanna. "Nightmares and Dreams". In Wilcox (2015), pp. 284–301.
  - Ehrman, Edwina. "Givenchy". In Wilcox (2015), pp. 104–109.
  - Lodwick, Keith. "Coup de Théâtre". In Wilcox (2015), pp. 247–251.
  - Miller, Janice. "Making-Up". In Wilcox (2015), pp. 234–241.
  - Phillips, Clare. "Armouring the Body". In Wilcox (2015), pp. 202–209.
  - Spooner, Catherine. "A Gothic Mind". In Wilcox (2015), pp. 141–158.
- Wilson, Andrew (2015). Alexander McQueen: Blood Beneath the Skin. New York City: Simon and Schuster. ISBN 978-1-4767-7674-3. OCLC 1310585849.
