= Mugler dress of Chappell Roan =

American entertainer Chappell Roan wore a custom deep garnet Thierry Mugler gown designed by creative director Miguel Castro Freitas to the 2026 Grammy Awards ceremony on February 1, 2026. The dress is a modern reinterpretation of a dress from the Spring/Summer 1998 "Jeu de Paume" couture collection.
