= Chris Klein =

Chris Klein may refer to:

- Chris Klein (soccer) (born 1976), American soccer player
- Chris Klein (actor) (born 1979), American actor
- Chris Klein (visual artist), Canada-based artist known for hyperrealistic paintings

== See also ==
- Chris Cline (1958–2019), American billionaire mining entrepreneur
- Chris Kline or Vertexguy (born 1979), American guitarist
- Christian Kleine (born 1974), German musician
- Christina Baker Kline (born 1964), American novelist
- Kristin Klein (born 1970), American volleyball player
- Chris Klein-Beekman (1971–2003), Canadian aid worker and victim of the Canal Hotel bombing
