= Gourmand (fragrance) =

Type of perfume

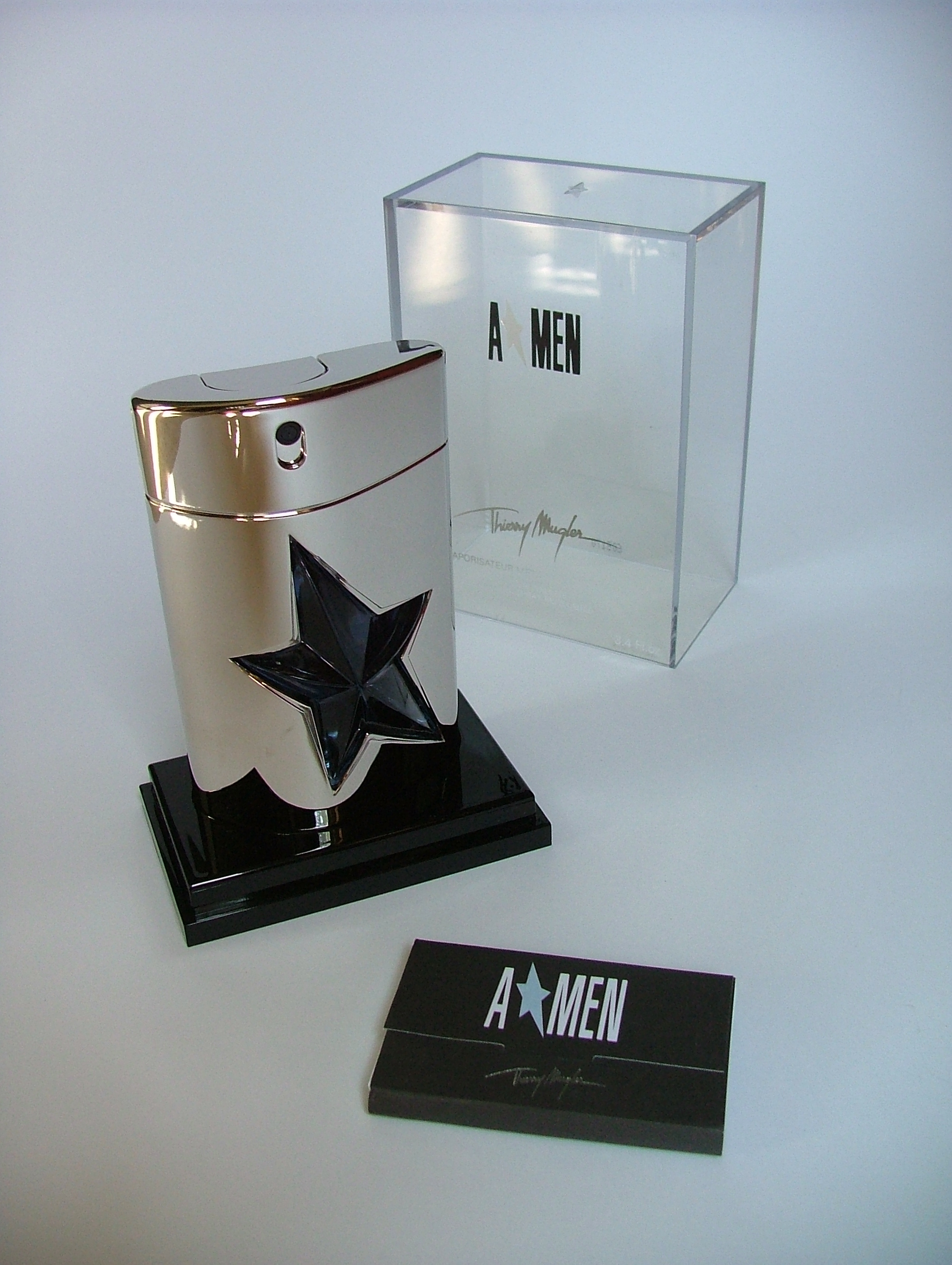
One example of a gourmand scent is Thierry Mugler's A*Men.

A gourmand fragrance is a perfume consisting primarily of synthetic edible (gourmand) notes, such as honey, chocolate, vanilla or candy. These top and middle notes may be blended with non-edible base notes such as patchouli, musk or tonka bean. They have been described as olfactory desserts. They are also called "foodie" fragrances and can be both feminine and masculine.

Thierry Mugler's Angel, launched in 1992, is credited as the first modern gourmand scent. Additional examples include Mugler's A*Men, Lancome's La Vie Est Belle, Lolita Lempicka's Lolita Lempicka and Au Masculin, Hanae Mori's Butterfly, Calvin Klein's Euphoria, Burberry's Brit for Men, Rochas' Rochas Man, Chopard's Wish and Viktor & Rolf's Antidote.

The gourmand trend has steadily increased in popularity since 1992, but is not a new concept. In 1956, Edmond Roudnitska created Diorissimo to counter the contemporary preference for heavy and sweet notes which are common in gourmand perfumes.

As the beauty market has evolved, gourmand scents have been attached to more than just sweetness. Perfumers created perfumes with nouvelle or even bizarre notes, such as lobster and pizza.

Most gourmand scents, such as those in the form of bath products, perfume or cologne, are not intended for human consumption. Other gourmand scents are not only scented but flavoured, such as Amoretti's line of products, or Jessica Simpson's discontinued Dessert Treats. These scented products include other forms such as lip glosses, dusting powders and lotions.

Gourmand is considered a subcategory of the modern family of fragrance. Gourmands may also work in combination with the fruity family of fragrance.
