= Miguel Castro Freitas =

Portuguese fashion designer

Miguel Castro Freitas is a Portuguese fashion designer. He is the creative director of Mugler, having been appointed in March 2025 to succeed Casey Cadwallader.
