= Angel (perfume) =

Fragrance by Mugler
- Category: Gourmand
- Designed for: Women
- Top notes: Bergamot
- Heart notes: Praline
- Base notes: Patchouli
- Released: 1992; 34 years ago
- Label: Mugler
- Perfumer(s): Olivier Cresp and Yves de Chirin
- Concentration: Eau de Parfum
- Flanker(s): Angel Nova; Angel Elixir; Angel Sunessence; Angel Eau Croisiere; Angel Muse

Angel is a 1992 perfume from Thierry Mugler and the first modern gourmand perfume, with notes of patchouli, praline, red berries, and vanilla. The perfumiers were Olivier Cresp and Yves de Chiris. The design of its bottle is an irregularly shaped star.

Angel, along with the company's companion scent Alien, accounts for $280 million in annual sales. The perfume continued to be produced after Mugler's luxury monobrand women's line folded. As of 2011, the fragrance was the fifth best-selling perfume of all time in the United States, according to The NPD Group. It once surpassed Chanel's No. 5 fragrance as the best-selling perfume in France, and remains one of the best-selling perfumes in Europe.

== Marketing ==
Previous faces of the Angel perfume line have included Jerry Hall, Naomi Watts, Eva Mendes, Toni Garrn, and Georgia May Jagger. In 2023, American actress Hunter Schafer was announced as the new face of the Angel perfume line.

== Awards ==
- FiFi Award Hall of Fame 2007
