= Robot couture =

1995 metallic catsuit by Thierry Mugler

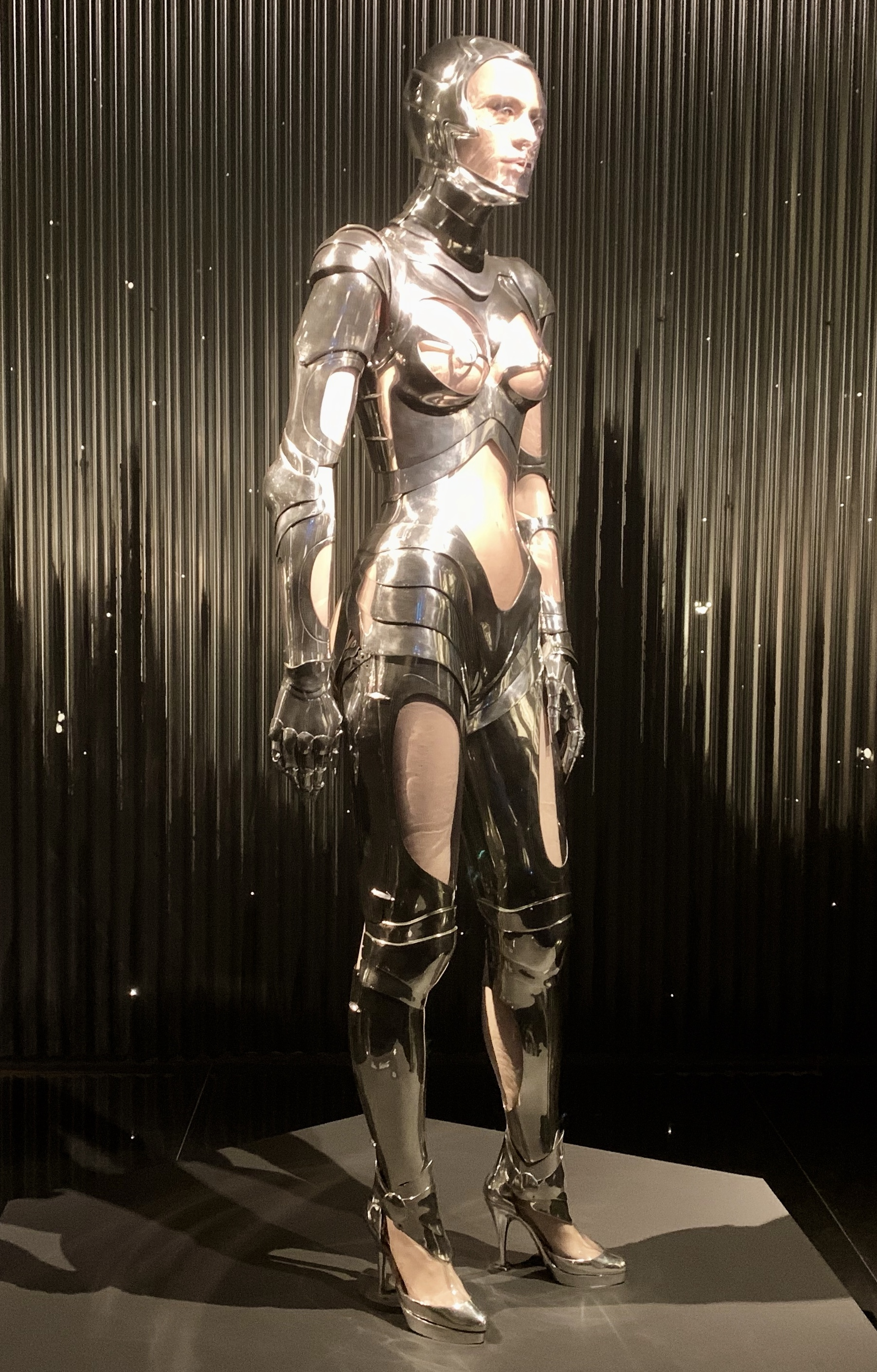
- Thierry Mugler retrospective at the Montreal Museum of Fine Arts, 2019
- Designer: Thierry Mugler
- Year: 1995
- Type: Metal catsuit
- Material: Metal, perspex

The Robot couture (also called the Cyborg suit or the Robot suit, amongst other names) was an haute couture garment designed in 1995 by Thierry Mugler, which he crafted as a futuristic cyborg-inspired metal and perspex catsuit. The garment was first unveiled by the fashion house of Mugler at its 20th anniversary haute couture fashion show in 1995. Thierry Mugler designed what Vogue Runway described as a "Silvery Cyborg Getup", in collaboration with Mr. Pearl, Jean-Jacques Urcun, and Jean-Pierre Delcros. Modeled at its premier by Nadja Auermann, the garment was inspired by Hajime Sorayama's erotic robot art and the 1927 science fiction film Metropolis.

== Design and symbolism ==
Although the suit remains unnamed, it was notably described by Vogue Runway as a "Silvery Cyborg Getup", has been called a "Fembot Suit", "Robot Couture" and a "Cyborg Suit", and "Robot woman", along with a slew of other names by other sources.

Designed by the late Thierry Mugler, the metal and perspex catsuit was unveiled at Mugler's fall/winter 1995 collection show at the Cirque d'Hiver in France. This intricate and unique garment was designed in collaboration with three renowned craftsmen: corsetiere Mr. Pearl, artist Jean-Jacques Urcun, and aircraft specialist Jean-Pierre Delcros. On the runway, this design's debut was marked as German supermodel Nadja Auermann performed a striptease where she shed a juxtaposing purple floor-length coat along with a sheer black cover-up, revealing the articulated metal jumpsuit.

The suit was inspired by the design of the Maschinenmensch, a humanoid robot from Fritz Lang's 1927 film Metropolis, and the sleek, erotic robots characteristic of Japanese illustrator Hajime Sorayama. Overall, this garment stands as a feminist symbol of allure and strength. Featuring strategic and striking perspex cutouts highlighting commonly idealized parts of the female body such as the buttocks, boobs, and face, Mugler melds the rigid robotic armor with the inherent fluidity of the female form to allude to ideas of the perfect plastic female form as a weapon.

This idea is in the same realm as the work of Hajime Sorayama, as the opaque and glistening metal acts as a barrier to desire while the perspex cutouts act to highlight the unattainable beauty standards women are subjected to in erotic media like porn. This idea isn't new to Mugler, as he often makes garments that reflect feminist ideals, such as women as warriors. The cutouts also stand to represent the intermixing of robotics and human forms, as his reference to Metropolis and Hajime Sorayama would imply; however, Mugler twists this idea by visually creating a definition between the two forms. This definition, by way of differential material usage, metal and perspex, provides a commentary on the fragmentation of female forms and the commodification of both the female and robotic body. The design eye-catching explores the interaction between humans and technology and reflects narratives around the intermixing of both organic and synthetic realms.

== Historical and cultural context ==
The debut of the garment came during a time when society was deeply engaged in discussions about the integration of human life and technology, fueled by the many technological advances of the early 1990s such as the World Wide Web, smartphone, and webcam. The 1990s saw a boom in fascination with cyborgs and AI, echoing fears and fantasies around the blurring of the boundary between humans and machines. With ties to Donna Haraway's "A Cyborg Manifesto," which challenges distinctions between humans and technology, The garment taps into these themes and ideas. With this garment, the body acts as a vessel for socio-political commentary and artistic expression.

== Reception and influence ==
The 1995 show, featuring the Robot garment, received critical acclaim as it was said to be one of the most unforgettable shows of the 1990s. More specifically, it was celebrated for its contemporary approach and theatricality of presentation, both of the garments and show, with guest star James Brown and Mugler's eccentric modeling style. The cyborg suit specifically received praise and has gone on to have a lasting impact on the fashion industry. A multitude of designers, namely Alexander McQueen and Dolce & Gabbana, have taken inspiration from this garment while exploring themes of technology and futurism in their work.

== Legacy ==
The cyborg suit continues to be held in high regard today, as it is still seen as a pivotal work that encapsulates the futuristic aesthetics of the 90s while still resonating with present themes in contemporary fashion. This garment has remained archived for a majority of the time since its photoshoot with world-renowned photographer Helmut Newton shortly after its debut in 1995. However, in 2010, this garment was spotted on the cover of the February edition of Vogue Germany and on the actress Zendaya in 2024 at the Dune: Part Two world premiere.

In 2021, Vogue listed it amongst its "14 couture moments that went down in fashion history".

== Appearances ==
Year	Event
1995	95' Fall Winter Haute Couture show
1995	Vogue US November 1995 photo shoot by Helmut Newton
2010	Vogue Germany 2010 February Cover
2024	Zendaya's appearance at Dune: Part Two world premiere

== See also ==
- List of individual dresses
- History of fashion design
