= Dante (collection) =

1996 fashion collection by Alexander McQueen

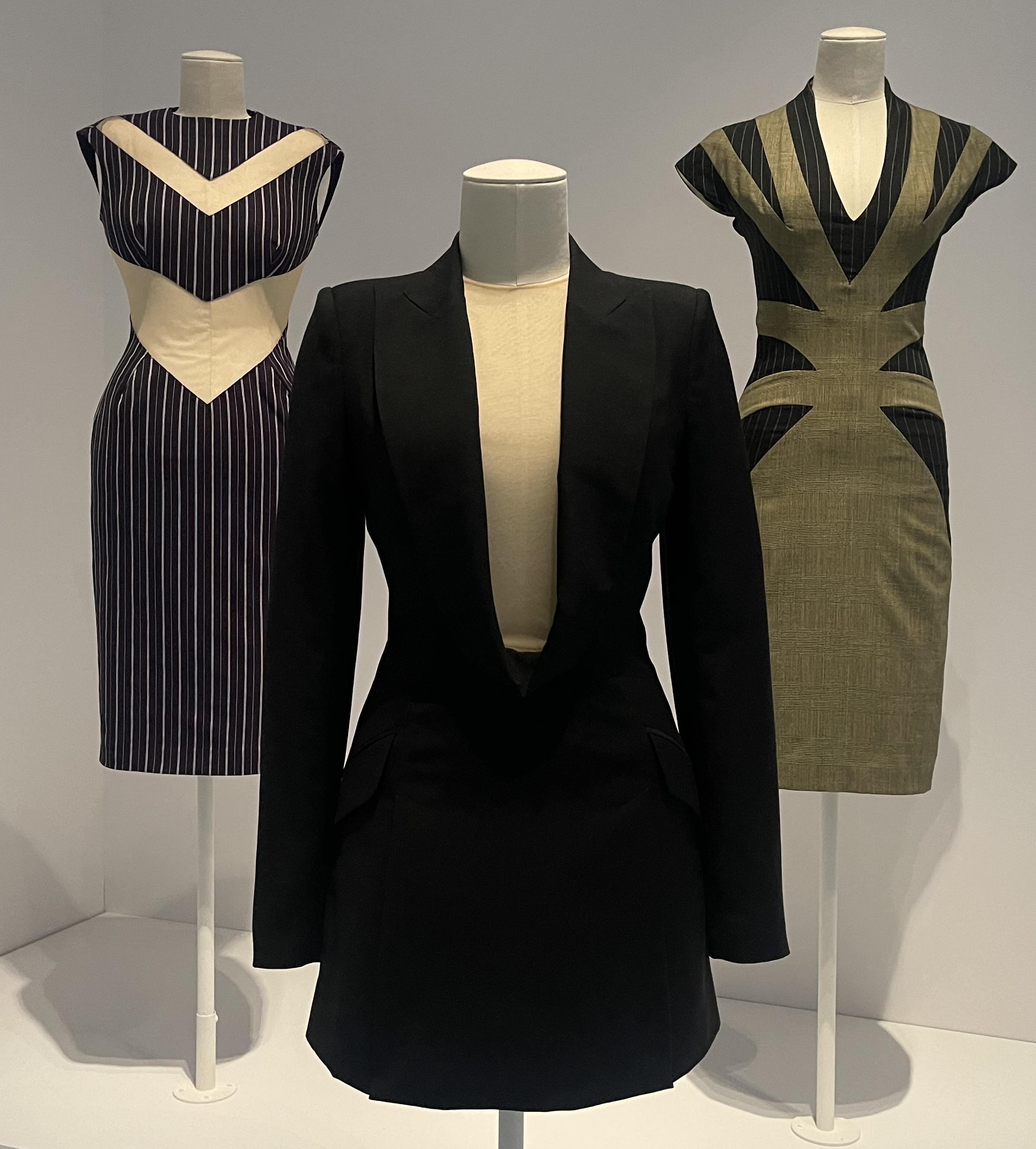
Three ensembles by McQueen at Musée des beaux-arts du Québec. Look 42 from Dante is on the left.

Dante is the eighth collection by British fashion designer Alexander McQueen, released for the Autumn/Winter 1996 season of his eponymous fashion house. Its concept was mainly inspired by the 14th century Florentine poet, writer and philosopher Dante Alighieri and his famous work Divine Comedy. The show was set in the Christ Church in Spitalfields (East London) on 1 March 1996. Some of the garments featured prints of Don McCullin’s photographs taken during the Vietnam War (1955-1975) and crucifix masks inspired in the photographer and a continuous referent in McQueen’s work, Joel-Peter Witkin’s self-portraits; the looks for this show also included Philip Treacy headpieces. The show was dedicated to McQueen’s long-time friend and muse, Isabella Blow; it constituted a commentary on religion and war.

This show was an important milestone in the British designer’s career, as it marked the beginning of a long list of "art-directed" shows by him. It attracted an international audience to McQueen's work, as it called the attention of the multinational corporation LVMH, resulting on McQueen's appointment as the creative director of the French haute couture house, Givenchy, later that year. Some pieces of the collection would be part of the exhibition dedicated to the British designer, Alexander McQueen: Savage Beauty, presented at the Metropolitan Museum of Art in New York in 2011 and the Victoria and Albert Museum in London in 2015.

== Inspiration and creative process ==
Religion has always been a recurrent theme in McQueen's work but, perhaps, it is in this collection when we see it more vividly. The figure of Dante Alighieri (who gives a name to this collection) and its personal views of hell and the afterlife developed in his famous work Divine Comedy, helped McQueen to craft the initial concept for the show. The legends that surrounded the English Baroque architect Nicholas Hawksmoor, who designed the Christ Church in Spitalfields (the venue used for the show), about his secret connections with satanism fascinated McQueen. Joel-Peter Witkin's dark and macabre photography was also a great influence for this collection, especially his self-portraits in which he wears a black mask with a crucifix between the eyes; later, this mask would be recreated for the collection. The war would be present on this collection; McQueen would be inspired by the work of the photojournalist Don McCullin, who immortalized extremely distressing scenes of the Vietnam War during the 1960s. McCulin's pictures were illegally printed by a friend in the Central Saint Martins College of Arts and Design (where McQueen studied). With this collection McQueen wanted to make a commentary on the relationship between war and religion; according to the designer: "I think religion has caused every war in the world, which is why I showed in a church". Isabella Blow, British fashion editor and discovered and friend of McQueen, was also a big influence for the collection as her taste for the Victorian aesthetics and fashion were present in the garments.

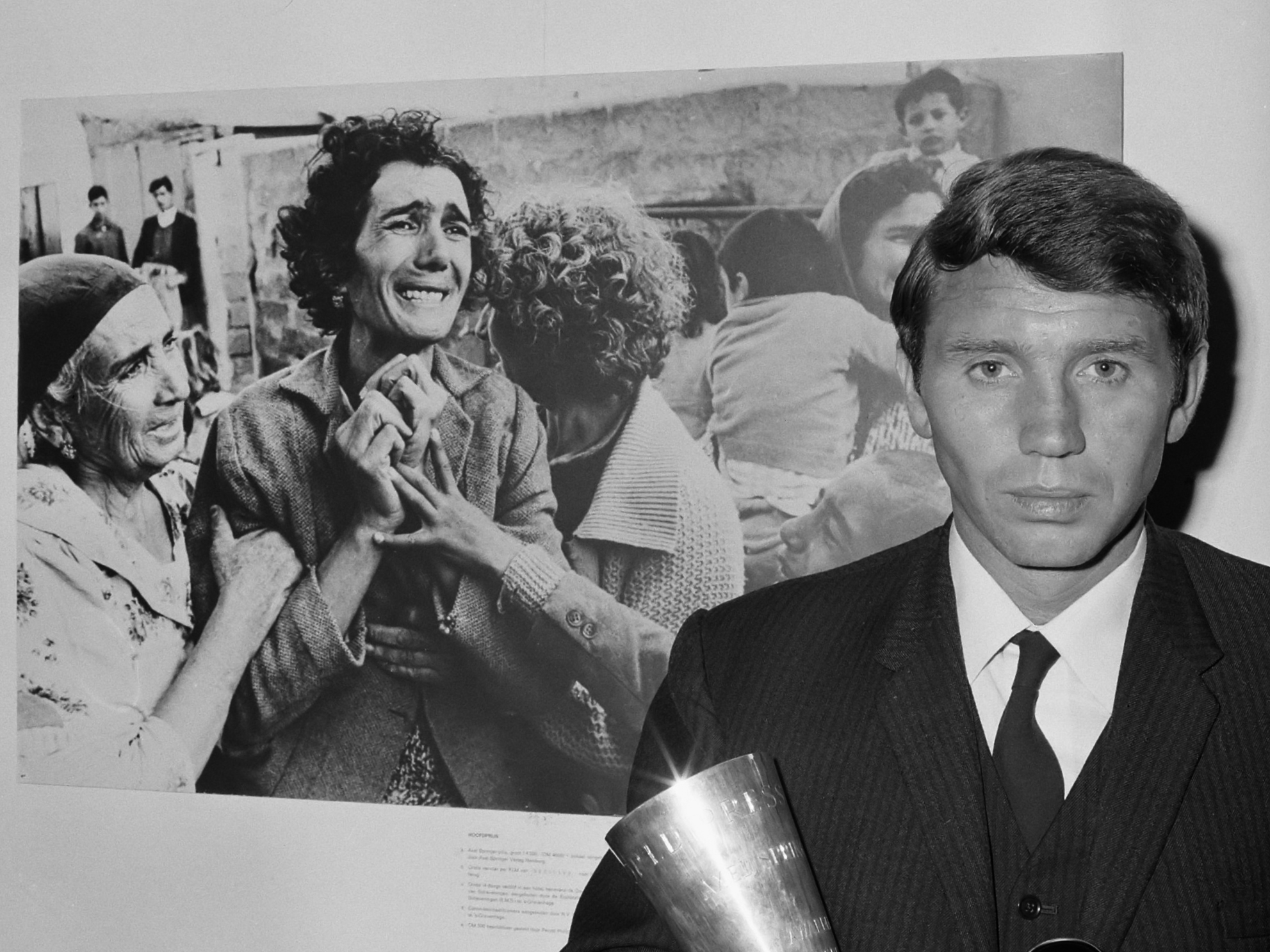
Don McCullin posing with one of his pictures (1964)

Lace was perhaps the principal fabric in this collection, not only used in dresses but also in veils and masks that covered model's faces. Denim and wool would also be used for the collection, many times as dresses and sweaters which would have been slashed showing the models’ breasts and hips. The collection also included corsetry and jewellery designed by Shaun Leane (a habitual member of McQueen's team). The haute couture milliner, Philip Treacy, also collaborated in this collection designing headpieces resembling alters and skulls. The selected colours for this collection were black (as in many cultures is a symbol of death and mourning) white or bone (symbol of purity) and soft purple or lilac (the colour of Victorian half-mourning). Prints of Victorian classical patterns and McCulin's pictures were also used in some of the garments. This collection was composed of 82 looks and it was the first time that McQueen would include menswear. Also, several fashion editors concluded that this collection had more wearable pieces than previous McQueen's collections, making it more accessible to buyers and critics.

== The show ==
Dante was presented in Christ Church in Spitalfields (East London). McQueen chose this location because of its disturbing past. The church was designed by Nicholas Hawksmoor in the 18th century and, since then, it has been the subject of controversy as there is a common belief that Hawksmoor had connections with Satanism. A century later, this location would be a central point of reference in the investigation of Jack the Ripper's murders as all the murders attributed to the killer were perpetrated on the surroundings of this church. McQueen used these facts to create certain tension among the models. The catwalk was built in a crucifix shape, and the music selected for the show included Samuel Barber’s "Adagio for Strings" mixed with pieces of Gregorian chant, hip hop and samples of the movie Apocalypse Now by Francis Ford Coppola.

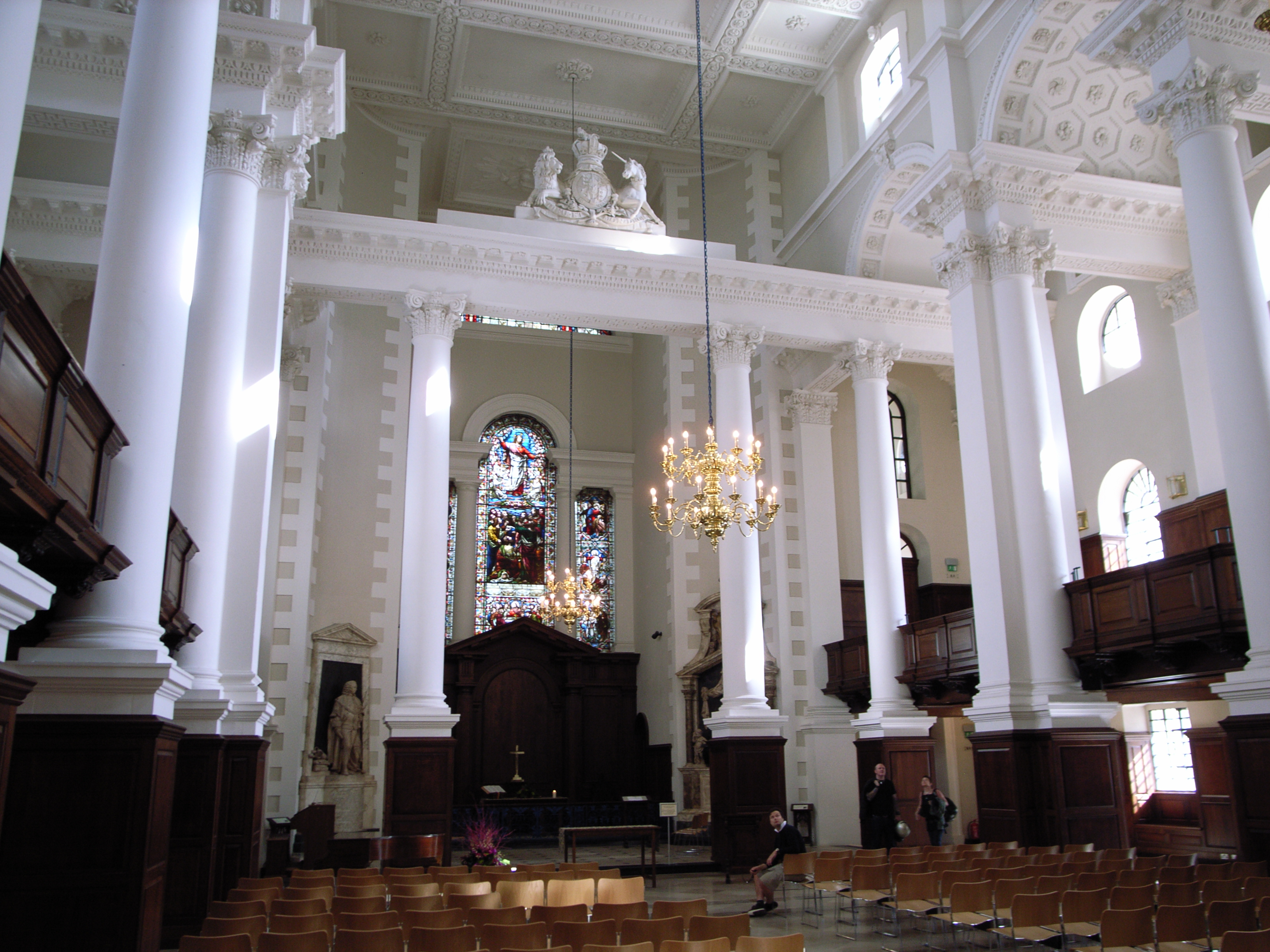
Interiors of the Christ Church, Spitalfields, the venue where Dante took place

The Show featured several iconic pieces in McQueen's career. It included numerous versions of the then famous McQueen's "Bumster" (A McQueen personal design of trousers and skirts with an extremely low rise which showed the spine's bottom of the models) that had been featured in previous collections. It was the first time that McQueen used acid-washed denim fabrics; the next time would be in his 1997 Autumn/Winter collection It's a Jungle Out There. This fabric was associated with the punk and skinhead gangs of the East End. The corset in which Honor Fraser closed the show (a lilac silk customized corset with black lace and extremely long neck) has turned in one of the most iconic McQueen pieces as it introduced architectural aspects in haute couture garments for the first time in McQueen's work. Debra Shaw walked wearing a Victorian bone shirt, a long tale velvet skirt and one of the Witkin's masks created for the show. This show would mean the first collaboration of McQueen and Kate Moss; she wore an oversized leather jacket, a dress with one of McCullin's pictures printed on it and a McCullin's top with a bumster. Several models wore pieces of jewellery and millinery which resembled crucifixes, antlers designed by Shaun Leane and Philip Treacy. Many models were not professional; McQueen used club kids from the East End for this show.

== Repercussion and legacy ==
Dante is considered one of the most important fashion shows in McQueen's career. This collection not only opened the doors to an international audience, but it also elevated McQueen as one of the most relevant and exciting figures of the British fashion scene. This show would be the first of a tradition of "big artistically produced fashion shows" that would last until the designer's death in 2010. Dante had tremendous success, being redone shortly after the first presentation, in an abandon Synagogue during the New York Fashion Week in 1996. That same year, McQueen would win "British Designer of the Year" in the British Fashion Awards and, later it would be appointed by LVMH corporation as the creative director of Givenchy. Several pieces of this collection would be featured in the retrospective exhibition dedicated to the late British designer, Alexander McQueen: Savage Beauty, presented in the Metropolitan Museum of Art (New York) in 2011 and the Victoria and Albert Museum (London) in 2015.

== See also ==
- Allegory
- Alternative fashion
- Avant garde
- Dante Alighieri and the Divine Comedy in popular culture
- Dress code
- Gothic fashion
- List of Alexander McQueen collections
- List of cultural references in the Divine Comedy
- Punk fashion
