= Casey Cadwallader =

American fashion designer (born 1979)

Casey Cadwallader (born August 15, 1979) is an American fashion designer who served as the creative director of Mugler from 2018 to 2025.

== Early life and education ==
Cadwallader grew up in rural New Hampshire. His early creative inspirations revolved around cars, which he frequently sketched and re-branded with new logos. Cadwallader later studied architecture at Cornell University, where he explored connections between clothing, furniture, and architectural design.

He cited designers such as Hussein Chalayan, Alexander McQueen, and Charles James. While at Cornell, Cadwallader and several other architecture classmates took courses in the university’s fashion program, leading to his first internship at Marc Jacobs.

== Career ==
Early in his career, Cadwallader worked for Gluckman Mayner Architects to design new Versace stores. He went on to hold design positions at Narciso Rodriguez, Loewe, and Acne Studios.

In 2018, Cadwallader was appointed creative director of Mugler. During his tenure, Mugler shows featured models of varying body types and included transgender models and artists from contemporary cultural scenes.

During the COVID-19 pandemic, Cadwallader transitioned from live runway shows to recorded ones. Collaborating with DIS magazine and Torso directors David Toro and Solomon Chase, he produced a series of short films featuring models such as Bella Hadid, Shalom Harlow, Amber Valletta, and Lourdes Leon, as well as actresses, artists, and musicians such as Megan Thee Stallion, Chloë Sevigny, and Dominique Jackson. The fashion and film campaign closed with a performance by ballerina Maria Kochetkova, dedicated posthumously to Thierry Mugler.

Design elements in Cadwallader's Mugler collections included bodysuits which integrated corsetry, vinyl-effect jersey, and denim without traditional side seams.

Cadwallader stepped down from his position at Mugler on March 25, 2025.
