= Chris Klein (visual artist) =

British-Canadian visual artist

Christopher Klein is a British visual artist based in Quebec, best known for his richly colored, hyperrealistic paintings portraying original scenic costumes from theatrical plays, films, and period collections. His oeuvre was described as "a poetics of observation as a repeated and prolonged meditation on these beautiful fabrics, folds, pleats and colours". Since the mid-nineties, he has worked as a scenic artist on many films and theatrical plays.

== Career ==
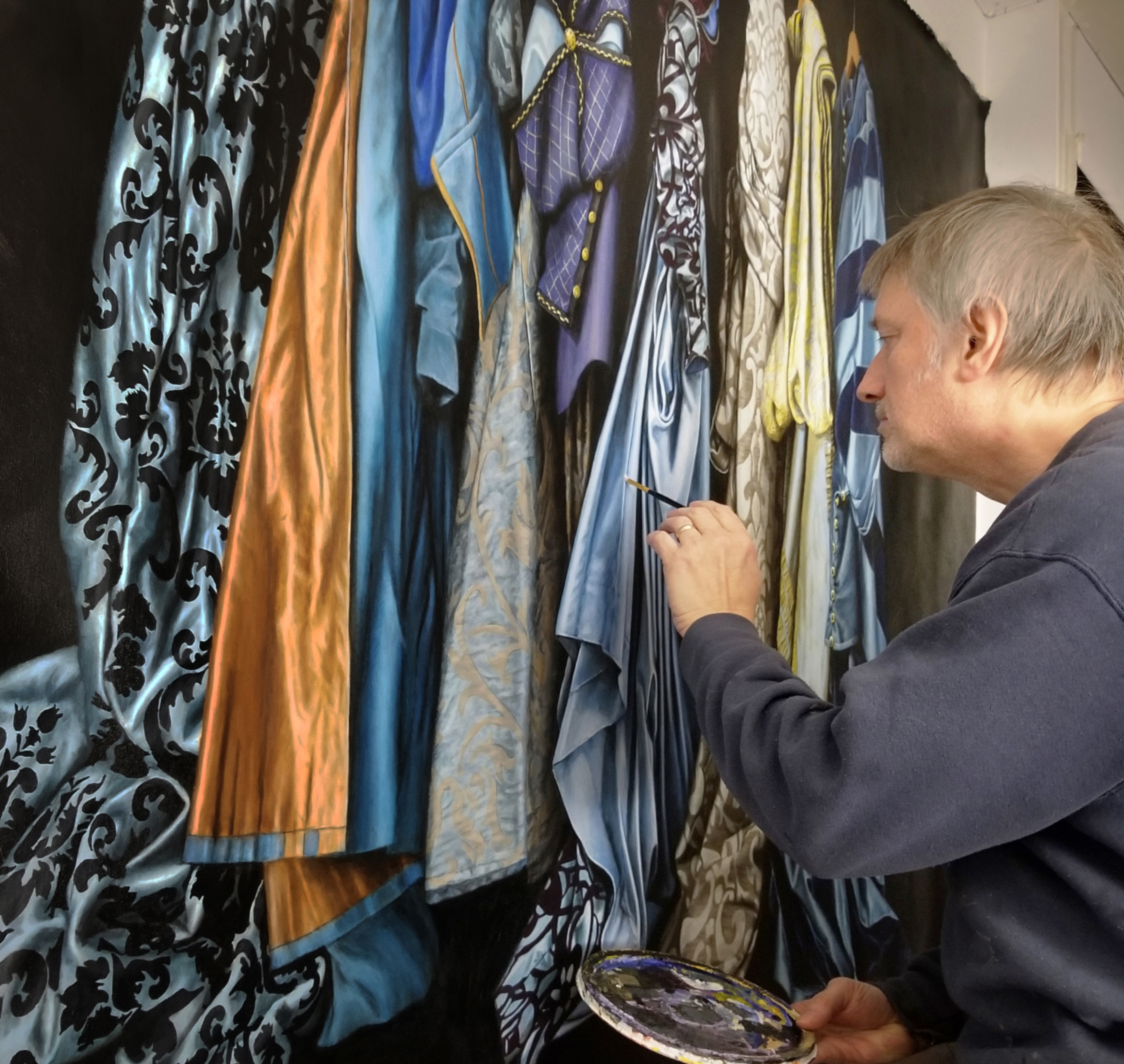
Klein in 2019 painting "The House of Montague"

In Ontario, Klein he was hired as a Head of Scenic Art at the Stratford Festival. Klein has painted costumes from major productions such as The Phantom of the Opera, and exhibited them at Bernaducci Gallery.

He has produced paintings inspired by the designs of Zandra Rhodes, and Thierry Mugler.

Klein painted costumes for the cover of a Disney brochure celebrating The Lion King's 20th anniversary in London. Klein's paintings of scrapyards were included in an exhibition at Nicole Longnecker Gallery.

== Awards ==
Klein's distinctions as an artist include:

- Shortlisted as a finalist to the Figuratieve Kunst Vandaag (FiKVA-foundation) International Award for Painters in 2022
- Best of Show, Grey Cube Gallery, 2022
- Grand Prize of the Teravarna Gallery Fall competition in 2023
- Winner, Boynes Monthly Art Award, December 2023

== Exhibitions ==
=== Solo shows ===
- 2013: Galerie Richelieu, Montreal, Canada
- 2013: Galerie Luz, Montreal, Canada
- 2016: Agora Gallery, Stratford, Ontario, Canada
- 2017: Westland Gallery, London, ON, Canada
- 2019: Bernarducci Gallery, New York

=== Other ===
- 2014: AFK Gallery, Lisbon, Portugal
- 2016: Nicole Longnecker Gallery, “Industrialism in the 21st Century”, Houston, USA
- 2017: Agora Gallery, Summer Show, Stratford, Ontario, Canada
- 2018: Agora Gallery, Summer Show, Stratford, Ontario, Canada
- 2019: Bantierra Palace, ArteLibre 20th Anniversary show, Zaragoza, Spain
- 2019: MEAM Museum, ArteLibre 20th Anniversary show, Barcelona, Spain
- 2019: Bernarducci Gallery, “New York Cool” New York, USA
- 2020: Art Palm Beach, Anthony Brunelli Gallery Booth, Florida, USA
- 2020: CK Contemporary Gallery, San Francisco, USA
- 2020: American University Art Museum in Washington DC, USA
- 2021: Agora at the Bruce, Agora Gallery, Stratford, Ontario, Canada
- 2021: Rarity Gallery, Mykonos, Greece
- 2021: Arte Roma Gallery, ArteLibre 20th Anniversary show, Zaragoza, Spain
- 2022: San Francisco Art Market, CK Contemporary booth, San Francisco, USA
- 2023: "Coronation", Plus One Gallery, London, UK
- 2023: San Francisco Art Market, CK Contemporary booth, San Francisco, USA
- 2023: CK Contemporary 10th Anniversary Show, San Francisco, USA
- 2023: Agora Gallery, Stratford, 10th Anniversary Show, Ontario, Canada
- 2023: HYPER'23, European Realism, Photobastei Gallery, Zurich, Switzerland
- 2023-2024: Christmas Show, Plus One Gallery, London, UK
- 2024: Fernand Nault: une passion, un legs, Galerie Montcalm, Gatineau, Quebec, Canada
