= Thierry Mugler =

French fashion designer (1948–2022)

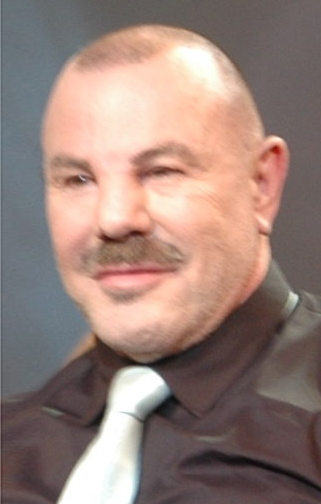
- Manfred Thierry Mugler in 2014
- Born: Manfred Thierry Mugler; 21 December 1948; Strasbourg, France
- Died: 23 January 2022 (aged 73); Vincennes, France
- Occupation: Fashion designer
- Known for: Angel fragrance, perfumes, Demi Moore's dress from Indecent Proposal
- Partner: Krzysztof Leon Dziemaszkiewicz

Manfred Thierry Mugler (French pronunciation: [manfʁɛd tjɛʁi myɡlɛʁ]; 21 December 1948 – 23 January 2022) was a French fashion designer, creative director and creative adviser of Mugler. In the 1970s, Mugler launched his eponymous fashion house; and quickly rose to prominence in the following decades for his avant-garde, architectural, hyperfeminine and theatrical approach to haute couture. He was one of the first designers to champion diversity in his runway shows, which often tackled racism and ageism, and incorporated non-traditional models such as drag queens, porn stars, and transgender women. In 2002, he retired from the brand, and returned in 2013 as the creative adviser.

At the beginning of his career he designed signature looks for Michael Jackson, Madonna, Grace Jones, Duran Duran, Viktor Lazlo, David Bowie and Diana Ross; most notably Demi Moore's dress from the 1993 movie Indecent Proposal, which was once coined "the most famous dress of the 1990s". In 1992, he directed and designed the outfits for George Michael's "Too Funky" music video; also that year he launched the perfume Angel, which became one of the best-selling perfumes of the 20th century. Mugler's fall 1995 haute couture collection, marking the 20th anniversary of his brand, was staged at the Cirque d'hiver venue in Paris; and has been referred to as the "Woodstock of Fashion", for having over 300 designed looks, an elaborate set design, dozens of high-profile supermodels and a performance from James Brown.

He also notably came out of retirement to design costumes for Beyoncé's I Am... World Tour, and created a one-off design for Kim Kardashian to wear to the 2019 Met Gala.

== Early life and education ==
Thierry Mugler was born in Strasbourg, France. At the age of 9, he began to study classical dance. By 14, he joined the ballet corps for the Rhin Opera (Opéra national du Rhin). As a teenager, he also began formal interior design training at the Strasbourg School of Decorative Arts.

== Career ==
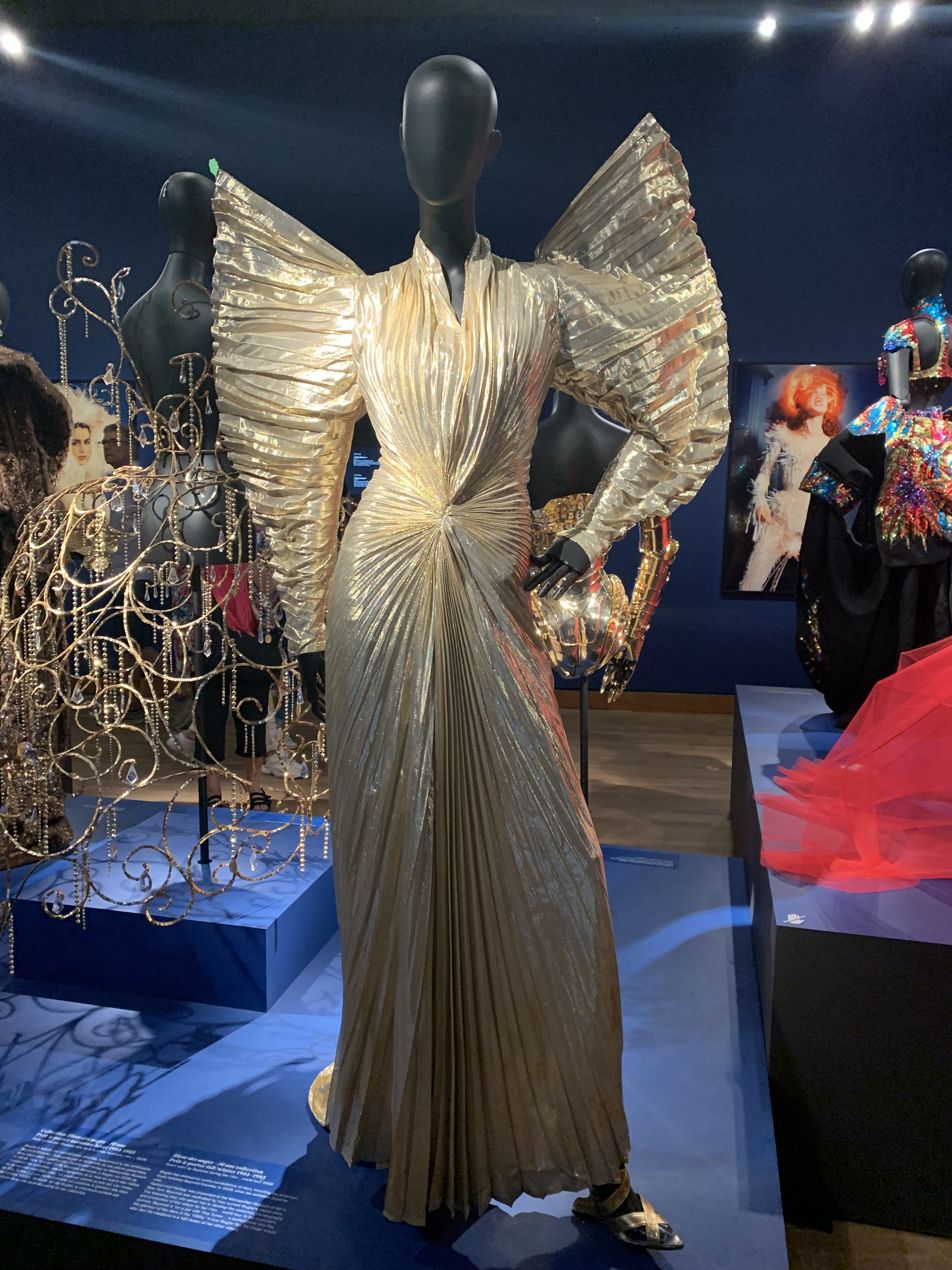
1984 pleated gold lamé dress

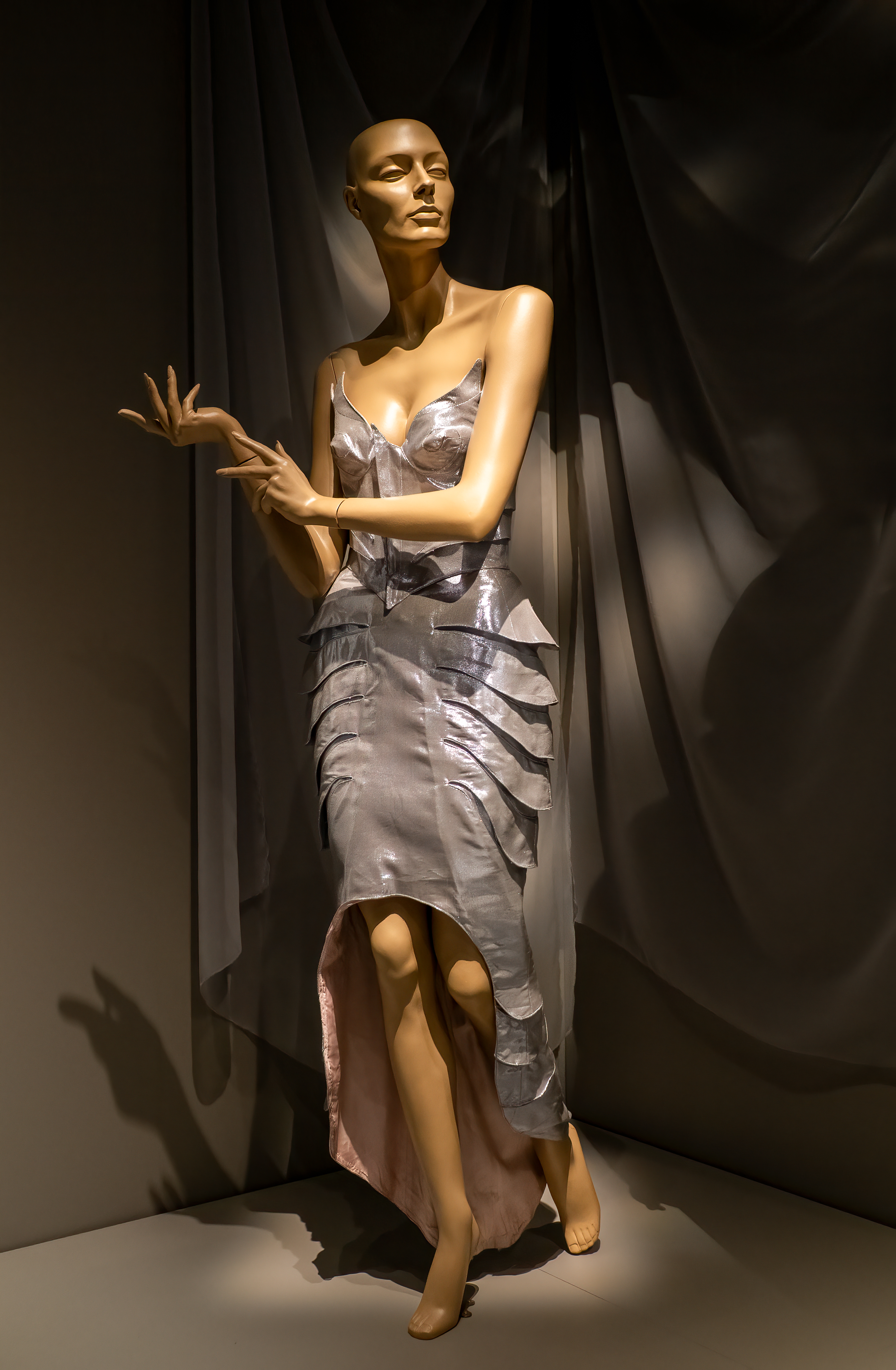
Mermaid dress, spring 1989, at the Museum at FIT

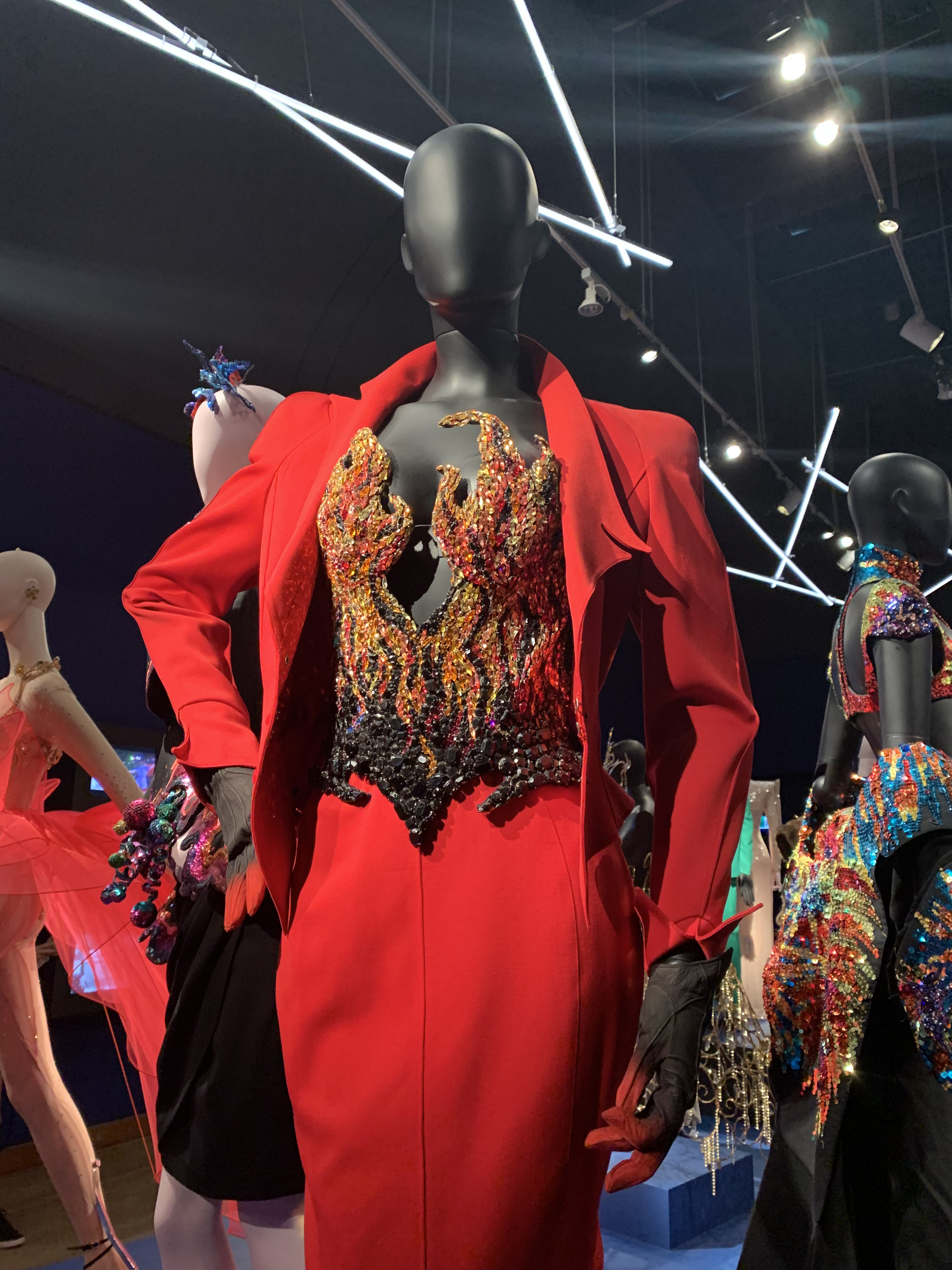
1988 Flame Corset & red power suit

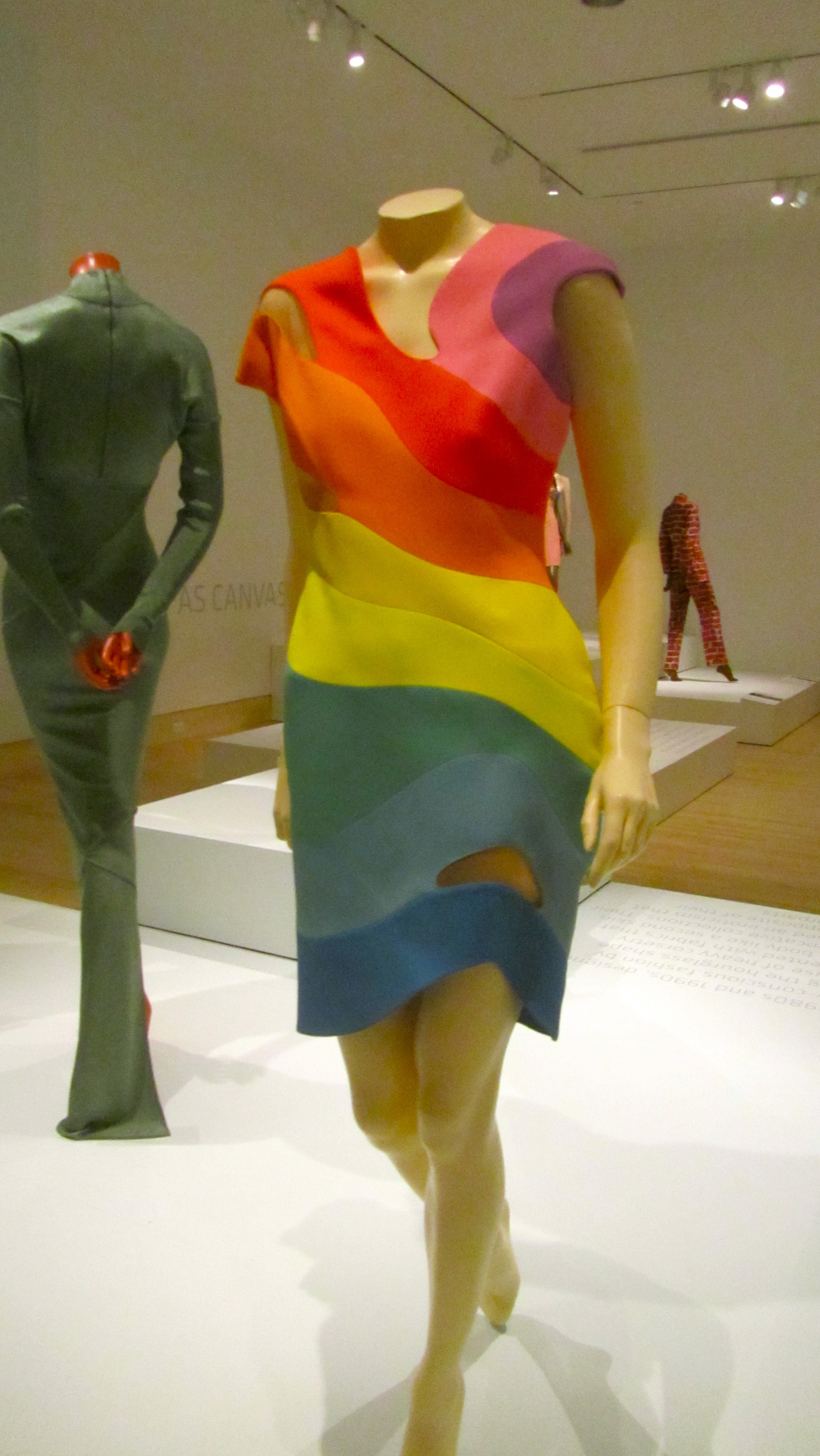
1990 'Rainbow Dress' (Indianapolis Museum of Art exhibit)

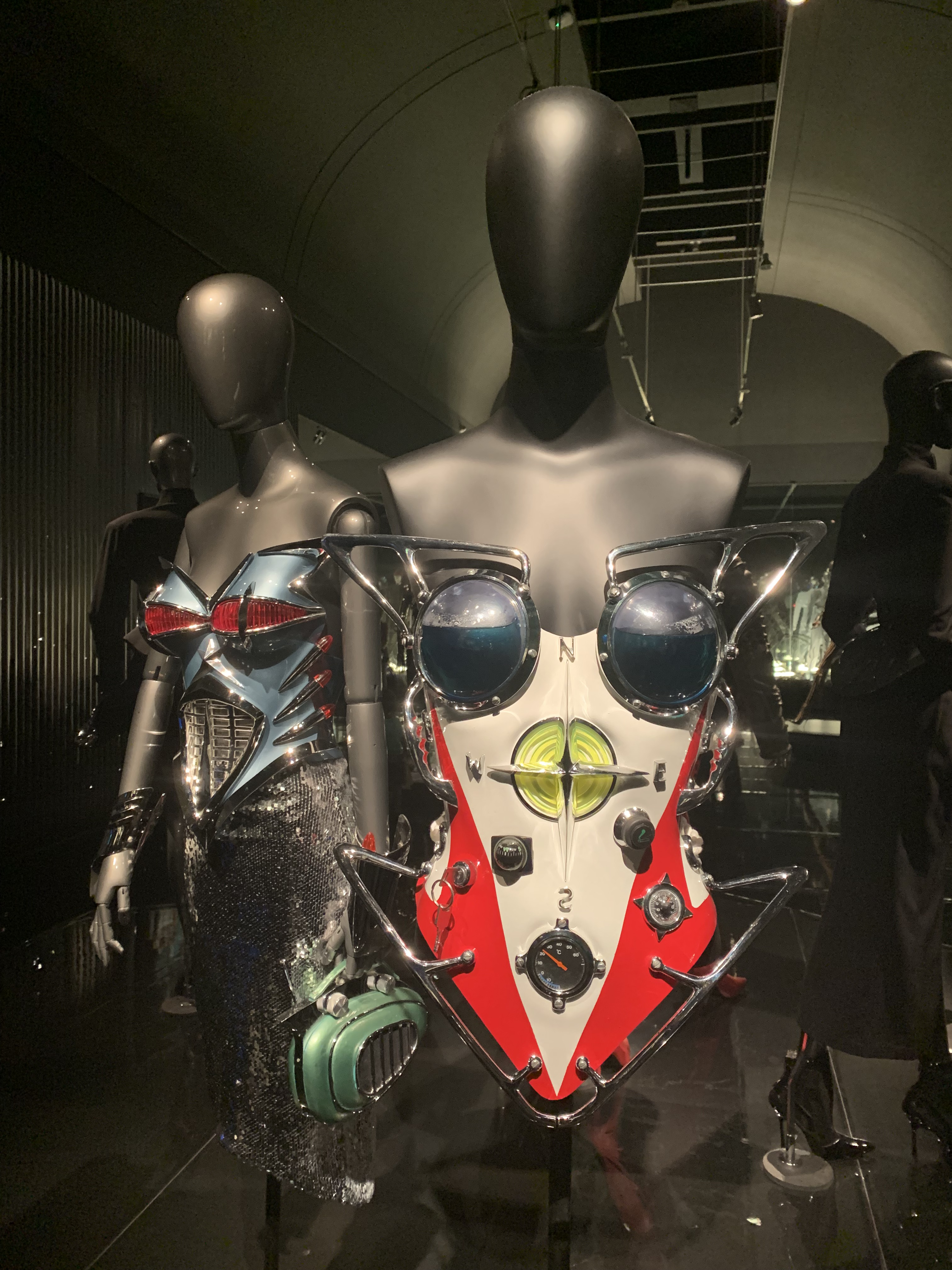
Automobile dress and motorcycle bustier

Mugler designed for the London boutiques Mr. Freedom and Mother Wouldn't Like It in the 1960s. In 1971, he began designing clothes for Karim, already showing the broad-shouldered, 1940s-derived looks he would become famous for in later years. In 1972, his full-skirted raincoat became a hit. At the age of 24, Mugler moved to Paris. He began designing clothes for Gudule, a Parisian boutique. At 26, he began to design for a variety of large ready-to-wear fashion houses in Paris, Milan, London and Barcelona.

In 1973, Mugler created his first personal collection called "Café de Paris". The style of the collection was both sophisticated and urban. Melka Tréanton, a powerful fashion editor, helped to launch his career. In 1976, she asked him to show his work in Tokyo for an event organized by Shiseido. The 1977 showing of his spring 1978 line displayed a punk influence. In 1978, he opened his first Paris boutique at the Place des Victoires in the 1er Arrondissement and rapidly gained attention as among the most extreme of the Fall 1978 broad-shoulder brigade of designers, with a penchant for mid-20th-century sci-fi themes and exaggerated 1940s-50s-style glamour marked by sharply constructed tailoring. He used exclusively Maud Frizon footwear in his late seventies-early eighties women's collections, the most influential shoe designer of the period. At the same time, Mugler launched a fashion collection for men. He would continue into the following decade with his 1940s-style shoulders on 1950s-tailored suits amid retrograde Wagnerian showmanship.

During the 1980s and 1990s Mugler became an internationally recognized designer, often grouped with his friends Claude Montana and Azzedine Alaïa but known especially for his shapely suits, and his collections garnered much commercial success. Except for a couple of sedate salon presentations in 1986 and 1987 (when he also reduced his shoulder padding), his fashion shows were extravagant affairs held in arena-like environments and the collections associated with them had themes, sci-fi and cavewoman themes in the late seventies, celestial themes later, a 60s theme one season, an arctic theme one season, an Africa theme another, a vampire-devil theme the next, and an aquatic theme the next, with ongoing creative motifs that would span multiple collections, like his late-eighties inclusion of garments and accessories modeled after the tailfins and chrome trim of 1950s U.S. automobiles, most recognizably 1959 Cadillacs. Another ongoing characteristic of Mugler's 1980s collections was an increased inclusion of 1950s items like hobbling sheath skirts, tottering stiletto heels, boned and corseted bodices, hats and gloves. This was especially evident in the showpieces from his circus-like arena extravaganzas. His spring 1989 oceanic-themed presentation, for instance, featured 1950s-style trumpet dresses/mermaid dresses that could have been lifted right out of the 1950s from designers like Marcel Rochas and Jacques Fath.

Mugler designed the dresses of Viktor Lazlo for hosting Eurovision Song Contest 1987. He created the black dress worn by Demi Moore in the 1993 movie Indecent Proposal.

Mugler published his first photography book in 1988, Thierry Mugler: Photographer. This was followed by a monograph in 1999, titled Fashion Fetish Fantasy, which assembles photos of his creations.

Mugler also directed short films, advertising films and video clips. He regularly designed costumes for musical comedies, concerts, operas and the theatre (including Macbeth for the Comédie Française). He worked with Robert Altman and George Michael (he directed the video for Michael's "Too Funky" in 1992). He also directed the first advertising film for one of his fragrances, Alien.

In 1990, Clarins acquired a 34 percent share in Thierry Mugler Couture when it signed a deal to produce the brand's fragrances. At the request of the Chambre Syndicale de la Haute Couture, he completed his first haute couture collection in 1992. By 1997, Clarins increased this share to 83.5 percent, acquiring its stake by purchasing stock from Mugler, the Marceau Group and Didier Grumbach. Since then, Clarins has held the rights to the Thierry Mugler name.

=== Retirement from fashion ===
Clarins shuttered the ready-to-wear component of Mugler's brand in 2003, due to financial losses. It kept the perfume division open as it was profitable. Mugler left fashion in 2002. When asked about the subject, he said: "Fashion is beautiful, 3-D art on a human being. But it wasn't enough, which is why I went on to create in other ways. For me, it wasn't the right tool anymore. But perfume still interests me".

In 2002, Mugler collaborated with the Cirque du Soleil. He directed "Extravaganza", one of the scenes of Zumanity, and also created all of the costumes and the identity of the characters in the show.

In 2008, the Mugler brand launched Thierry Mugler Beauty, a high-end line of cosmetics.

In 2009, Mugler worked as artistic advisor to singer Beyoncé. He created the costumes for her "I Am... World Tour".

In September 2010, Nicola Formichetti was announced to be the Creative Director of the Thierry Mugler brand. He changed the brand name to MUGLER, removing the first name, and in January 2011, he launched the revival of the brand's menswear collection in collaboration with Romain Kremer.

An April 2010 New York Times story discussed Mugler's cosmetic transformation. "[Mugler has] taken to calling himself Manfred and transformed his body...into what is apparently a 240-pound spectacle of muscle and nipple and tattoo..."

With over two years of being the creative director of MUGLER, Formichetti announced in April 2013 that he and the fashion house would be parting ways. Formichetti left MUGLER to work for the Italian brand Diesel.

In December 2013, House of Mugler announced David Koma as the artistic director.

In 2016, Mugler created and directed the music video and staging for San Marino's Eurovision Song Contest entry "I Didn't Know" performed by Turkish singer Serhat.

Despite retiring from his brand in 2003, he made the exception to design under his name "House of Mugler" for the Met Gala in 2019 and for Kim Kardashian. Getting his inspiration from Sophia Loren in the film Boy on a Dolphin, Mugler envisioned a wet California girl; hence the creation of the "wet couture dress".

The American designer Casey Cadwallader was named Mugler's new creative director in December 2017. During the period of the pandemic, Mugler skipped runways for video shows that were co-created with DIS magazine's spin-off, Torso Solutions. Megan Thee Stallion, Chloe Sevigny, Bella Hadid, and Eartheater were featured in the Mugler Spring 2022 Ready-to-Wear Collection video which ended with a brief homage to the late Mugler. The homage was dancing feature by prima ballerina Maria Kochetkova and vogueing superstar Barbie Swaee.

After an almost three-year hiatus from runway shows, Mugler returned to an in-person show in Paris FW 2023. The runway featured models Adut Akech, Paloma Elsesser, Eva Herzigova, Ziwe, Arca and Memphy. An image was shown on an extra-large TV screen flanked by a staircase in the middle of the runway fusing digital with IRL.

In March 2025, Mugler announced the appointment of Miguel Castro Freitas as the new Creative Director for the house.

=== Fragrances ===
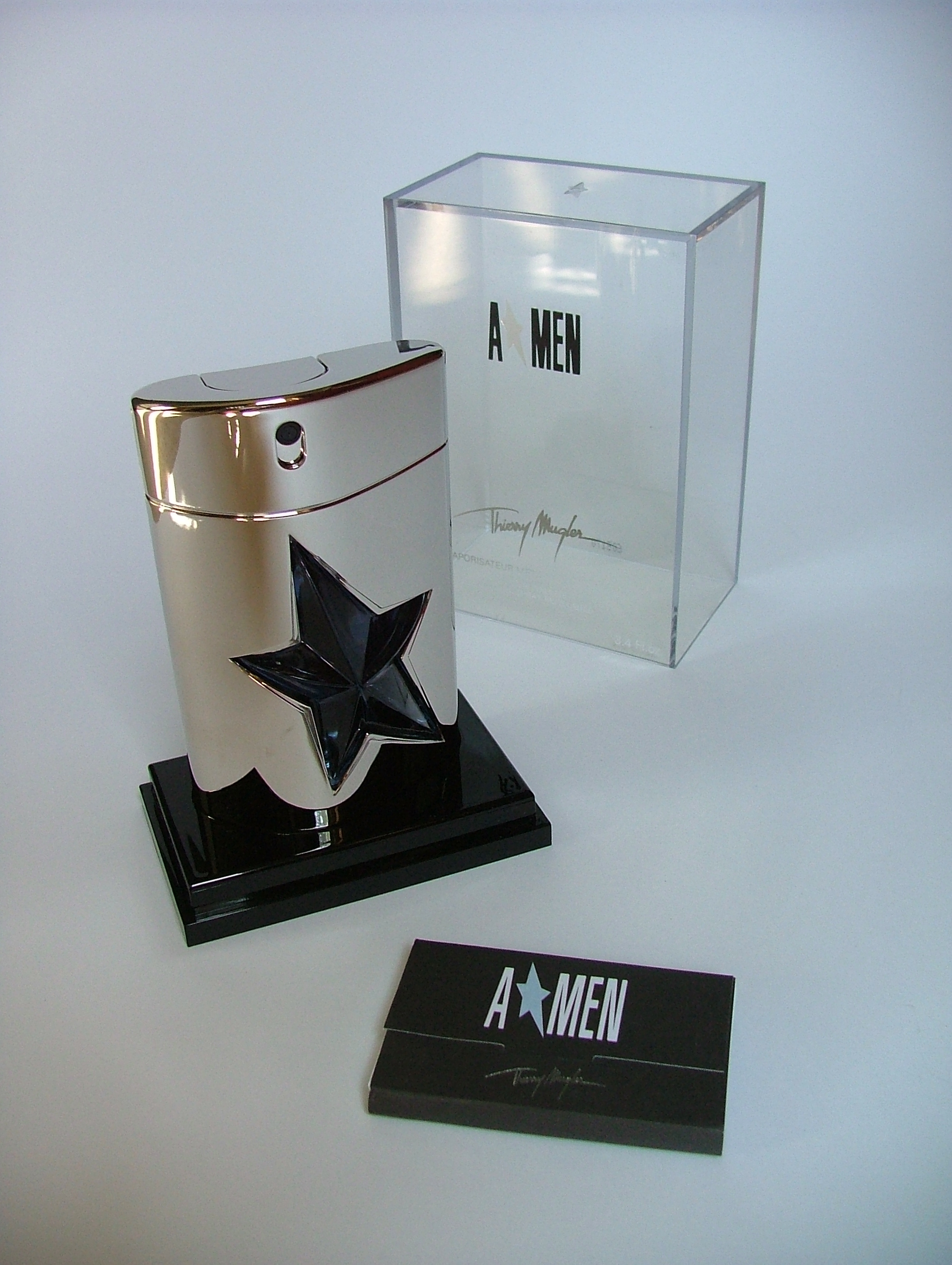
Angel for men (A*Men)

Mugler's first perfume appeared in 1992 and was called "Angel". It contains a combination of praline and chocolate mixed with a strong accord of patchouli. It would be a part of a new fragrance type called gourmand. Angel was created by perfumers Olivier Cresp and Yves de Chiris following more than 600 test formulations. The Angel bottle, in the shape of a faceted star, was created by the Brosse Master Glassmakers. Fans of the fragrance include Diana Ross, Barbara Walters, Eva Mendes and Hillary Clinton.

In 1996, Mugler followed up Angel with a male version named Angel Men or A*Men. This fragrance includes notes of caramel, coffee, vanilla, patchouli and honey.

In 2005, Alien was created, the second major Thierry Mugler fragrance. Also in 2005, Mugler launched the "Thierry Mugler Perfume Workshops", which are open to the general public and led by specialists of the perfumery and oenology world.

In 2006, Mugler completed a project for the launch of Tom Tykwer's film Perfume. In collaboration with the IFF company, Mugler created a box set of fifteen compositions.

During 2007, still following the metamorphosis theme, Mugler launched Mirror, Mirror, a collection of five fragrances, created as "perfume-trickery" to "enhance one's presence".

Angel and Alien together produce about $280 million in sales annually.

In 2010, the fragrance Womanity was released by the House of Mugler.

Angel Muse was released in 2015; Angel Nova was released in June 2020. A recent Angel flanker is Angel Elixir, released in February 2023 with a campaign starring Hunter Schafer, with the flankers Angel Fantasm (2024) and Angel Stellar (2025) following respectively.

== Legacy ==
In later years, Mugler's vintage designs saw a significant resurgence among celebrities, including Lady Gaga in the music video for "Telephone", and Cardi B who worked with Mugler, often wearing his vintage designs on red carpets and music videos, as well as mentioning the brand in the song "Wild Side". His vintage designs are among the most coveted luxury vintage brands for Generation Z consumers, according to Teen Vogue.

In 2019, the Montreal Museum of Fine Arts launched the 'Thierry Mugler: Couturissime' exhibition dedicated to him. Since 2019, visual artist Chris Klein, started painting some of Mugler's designs. Mugler was a supporter of transgender rights and frequently included the transgender supermodel Connie Fleming in his shows. Transgender models in major fashion shows were rare in the 80s and 90s, but Mugler refused to shut them out.

== Personal life and death ==
Mugler was openly gay and a longtime bodybuilder. Following his departure from fashion he became reclusive, went by his first name (Manfred) and began extensive bodybuilding. In 2019, he said "Thierry Mugler" was a label and a brand, and as such he wanted to move on to other things.

Mugler had several accidents that changed his appearance. His nose was destroyed in a jeep crash. A motorcycle accident involving steel cables also saw Mugler have a piece of metal removed from his leg. In an interview with Interview magazine, Mugler stated, "I asked another surgeon if he could do some things to my chin, and then I was happy to get the bloody anesthesia. He actually took a piece of bone from my hip and put it on my chin, so I don't have any plastic or silicone. It's all bones. I wanted my face to represent progress, because after years of being a thin, charming dancer, I wanted to be a warrior. I've done so much in my life. I've fought so much. I'm a superhero, so it's normal to have the face of one."

Mugler died of natural causes at his residence in Vincennes near Paris, on 23 January 2022, at the age of 73.

== See also ==
- Robot couture
