= Historiography of Skanderbeg =

Study of the history of Skanderbeg

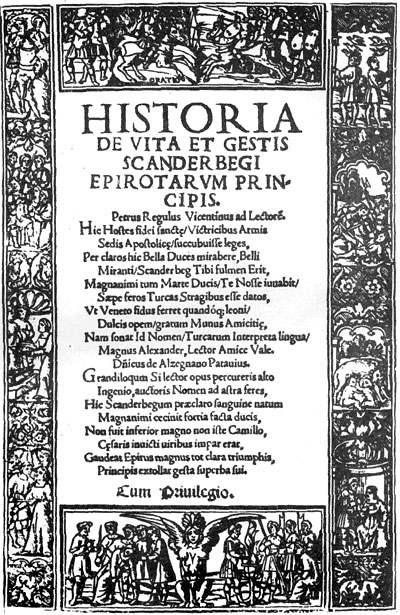
Frontispiece of Historia de vita et gestis Scanderbegi, Epirotarum principisby Marin Barleti

The Historiography of Skanderbeg involves the study and writing of the history of Gjergj Kastrioti, known as Skanderbeg. This includes the analysis of historical sources, interpretation of events, and consideration of cultural and political factors in shaping the narrative of his life and deeds. Skanderbeg's historiography has sparked debates and evolved over centuries, reflected in various interpretations and historiographical approaches throughout different periods.

Skanderbeg has been the subject of many works of history, art and literature and the inspiration for countless others. It is a motif in the visual arts, the performing arts, poetry, prose and music.

Skanderbeg gathered a posthumous reputation in Western Europe in the 16th and 17th centuries. With much of the Balkans under Ottoman rule and with the Turks at the gates of Vienna in 1683.

== History and literature ==
There are two literature works on Skanderbeg written in the 15th century. The first was written at the beginning of 1480 by Serbian writer Martin Segon who was Catholic Bishop of Ulcinj and one of the most notable 15th-century humanists. A part of the text he wrote under title Martino Segono di Novo Brdo, vescovo di Dulcigno. Un umanista serbo-dalmata del tardo Quattrocento is short but very important biographical sketch on Skanderbeg (Italian: Narrazioni di Giorgio Castriotto, da i Turchi nella lingua loro chiamato Scander beg, cioe Alesandro Magno). Another 15th-century literature work with Skanderbeg as one of the main characters was Memoirs of a janissary (Serbian: Успомене јаничара) written in period 1490—1497 by Konstantin Mihailović, a Serb who was a janissary in Ottoman Army.

In Western Europe the books on Skanderbeg began to appear in the early 16th century. Raffaelo Maffei published in Rome in 1506 his "Commentariorum" in which he published a short biography on Skanderbeg. Two years later one of the earliest works, the Historia de vita et gestis Scanderbegi, Epirotarum Principis (English: History of the life and deeds of Scanderbeg, Prince of the Epirotes) (Rome, 1508), was published a four decades after Skanderbeg's death. This book was written by Albanian historian Marin Barleti (Latin: Marinus Barletius Scodrensis), who, after experiencing the Ottoman capture of his native Shkodër at firsthand, settled in Padua where he became rector of the parish church of St. Stephan. Barleti dedicated his work to Don Ferrante Kastrioti, Skanderbeg's grandchild, and to posterity. The book was first published in Latin. Barleti is sometimes inaccurate in favour of his hero, for example, according to Gibbon, Barleti claims that the Sultan was killed by disease under the walls of Krujë. Barleti's inaccuracies had also been noticed prior to Gibbon by Laonikos Chalkokondyles. Barleti made up spurious correspondence between Vladislav II of Wallachia and Skanderbeg wrongly assigning it to the year 1443 instead to the year of 1444. Barleti also invented correspondence between Skanderbeg and Sultan Mehmed II to match his interpretations of events.

In the 16th and 17th centuries, Barleti's book was translated into a number of foreign-language versions: in German by Johann Pincianus (1533), in Italian by Pietro Rocca (1554, 1560), in Portuguese by Francisco D'Andrade (1567), in Polish by Ciprian Bazylik (1569), in French by Jaques De Lavardin (French: Histoire de Georges Castriot Surnomé Scanderbeg, Roy d'Albanie, 1576), and in Spanish by Juan Ochoa de la Salde (1582). The English version was a translation made by Zachary Jones Gentleman from de Lavardin's French version, and was published at the end of the 16th century under the title, Historie of George Castriot, surnamed Scanderbeg, King of Albinie; containing his Famous Actes, his Noble Deedes of Armes and Memorable Victories against the Turkes for the Faith of Christ. The Serbian version is the major part and the first manuscript of the Cetinje chronicle. All these books, written in the panegyric style that would often characterize medieval historians who regarded history mostly as a branch of rhetoric, inspired a wide range of literary and art works.

Gjon Muzaka, an Albanian nobleman from the Muzaka family, wrote his memoires Breve memoria de li discendenti de nostra casa Musachi [Brief Chronicle on the Descendants of our Musachi Dynasty] in 1510 which contains substantial text about Skanderbeg. In 1562 John Shute translated to English tract Two very notable commentaries: The one of the original of the Turcks and the empire of the house of Ottomanno, and the other of the warre of the Turcke against George Scanderbeg written by Andrea Cambini and Paolo Giovio at the beginning of the 16th century. Michel de Montaigne wrote an essay on Skanderbeg at the end of the 16th century.

Luis Vélez de Guevara, a Spanish dramatist and novelist, wrote three comedies about Skanderbeg referred to as "escanderbechas". The first comedy titled El jenízaro de Albania [The janissary of Albania] was written in period 1608—1610, the second titled El principe Escanderbey [Prince Scanderbeg] in period 1620—1628 and the third titled El principe esclavo [The Slave Prince] in 1629. In 1623 in Rome, we have the first book on Skanderbeg written by a woman Margherita Sarrocchi, a long poem titeled Scanderbeide. Skanderbeg was one of the heroes (Scannarebecco) of Pentamerone written by Giambattista Basile, published posthumously in 1634 and 1636.

Frang Bardhi, an Albanian Catholic bishop born in Albania, also wrote Kastrioti's biography, prompted by writings of another Catholic bishop, Ivan Tomko Mrnavić. His book "Georgius Castriotus, Epirensis vulgo Scanderbegh, Epirotarum Princeps Fortissimus" was published in Latin in 1636. French philosopher, Voltaire, in his works, held in very high consideration the hero from Albania. Ludvig Holberg, a Danish writer and philosopher, claimed that Skanderbeg is one of the greatest generals in history. Sir William Temple considered Skanderbeg to be one of the seven greatest chiefs without a crown, along with Belisarius, Flavius Aetius, John Hunyadi, Gonzalo Fernández de Córdoba, Alexander Farnese, and William the Silent.

A number of poets and composers have also drawn inspiration from his military career. The French 16th-century poet Ronsard wrote a poem about him, as did the 19th-century American poet, Henry Wadsworth Longfellow. Gibbon, the 18th-century historian, holds Skanderbeg in high regard with panegyric expressions.

Numerous poets and writers from Dubrovnik wrote about Skanderbeg, like Ivan Gundulić in his greatest work Osman at the beginning of the 17th century and Junije Palmotić in his work Glasovi where he mentions Skanderbeg among other heroes of Serbian epic poetry. Many authors from Croatia wrote about Skanderbeg, including Pavao Ritter Vitezović in 1682 and especially Andrija Kačić Miošić whose poems about Skanderbeg, published in 1756, were basis for tragedy Skenderbeg written by Ivan Kukuljević Sakcinski in the 19th century.

Giammaria Biemmi, an Italian priest, published a work on Skanderbeg titled Istoria di Giorgio Castrioto Scanderbeg-Begh in Brescia, Italy in 1742. He claimed that he had found a work published in Venice in 1480 and written by an Albanian humanist from Bar, in modern-day Montenegro whose brother was a warrior in Skanderbeg's personal guard. According to Biemmi, the work had lost pages dealing with Skanderbeg's youth, the events from 1443–1449, the Siege of Krujë (1467), and Skanderbeg's death. Biemmi referred to the author of the work as Antivarino, meaning the man from Bar. The "Anonymous of Antivari" was Biemmi's invention that some historians (Fan S. Noli, and Athanase Gegaj), Albanian writers had not discovered and used his forgery as source in their works.

Notable works of Tripo Smeća (1755—1812), a historian and writer from Perast in Boka Kotorska, include Italian language tragedy "Skanderbeg". Vuk Karadžić was particularly interested in Skanderbeg's era as important period of joint Albanian-Serbian struggle against the Ottomans in the 15th century, so he paid for translation of one of Skanderbeg's biographies to Serbian language. In 1816 Sima Milutinović Sarajlija, Serbian poet and historian, wrote two poems about Skanderbeg. Milutinović considered himself as spiritual descendant of Skanderbeg.

Miošić's poems about Skanderbeg from his most important work A Pleasant Discourse of the Slavic People were also basis for Život i viteška voevanja slavnog kneza epirskog Đorđa Kastriota Skenderbega written by Serbian playwright Jovan Sterija Popović in 1828. Ljudevit Gaj published in 1839 and 1840 in periodical Danica ilirska two texts about Skanderbeg, Juraj Skenderbeg and Muhammad and Juraj Skenderbeg and Amurat. Juraj Matija Šporer wrote a tragedy Kastriota Škenderbeg: tragedija u pet izvedah published in Zagreb in 1849 and depicted Skanderbeg as Slav who gathered around himself all South Slavs from Istria to Krujë. Skanderbeg was a subordinate theme in epic poem written by Serbian 19th century academic Jovan Subotić.

Benjamin Disraeli's 1833 novel, The Rise of Iskander, is based on Skanderbeg's life and was written two years after his visit to Albania during his Grand Tour.

Skanderbeg is also mentioned by Prince of Montenegro, Petar II Petrović-Njegoš, one of the greatest poets of Serbian literature, in his poem The Mountain Wreath (1847), and in False Tsar Stephen the Little (1851). In 1855, Camille Paganel wrote Histoire de Scanderbeg, inspired by the Crimean War, whereas in the lengthy poetic tale Childe Harold's Pilgrimage (1812–1819), Byron wrote with admiration about Skanderbeg and his warrior nation.. In 1862, the Bulgarian writer Grigor Parlichev wrote a poem called Skenderbey in Greek.

Jeronim de Rada (Girolamo de Rada), an Albanian-Italian writer (Arberesh), published poem in AlbanianScanderbeccu i pa-faan [Misfortunate Scanderbeg] in period 1872—1884. Paul Pisani, French historian and Franciscan friar, wrote La Légende de Skanderbeg in 1891. The first [Albanian poet] who wrote epic account about Skanderbeg's battles against the Ottoman Empire was Naim Frashëri, Albanian poet and writer in Histori e Skënderbeut [History of Skanderbeg] published in 1898.

A short story Đurađ Kastriotić Skenderbeg written by the Serbian writer Stevan Sremac was published in 1909.

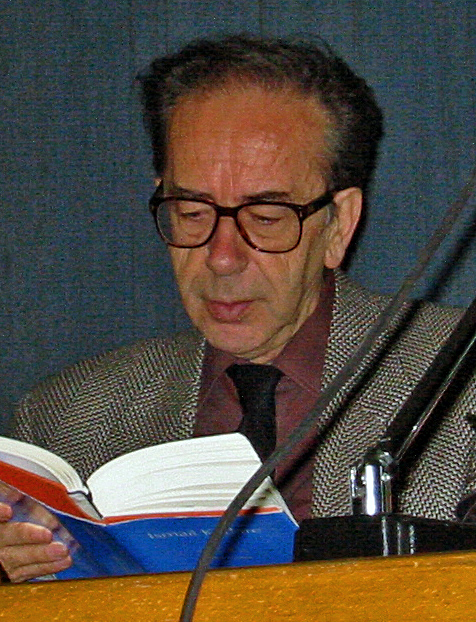
Ismail Kadare wrote The Castle with Skanderbeg as one of the main characters

In The Castle, a work written in 1970 by Ismail Kadare, an Albanian writer who has several times been a candidate for the Nobel Prize, which refers to Skanderbeg though he is not a protagonist.

In Alfred Döblin's novel Berlin Alexanderplatz, an unnamed character recounts the story of Stefano Zannowich, a pretender who claimed descent from Skanderbeg.

== Theatre ==
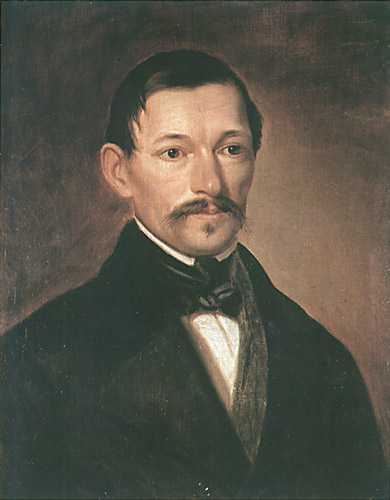
Jovan Sterija Popović, author of Serbian Đorđe Kastriotić, 1403–1468, the Greatest Strategian of the World

Skanderbeg is the protagonist of three 18th-century British tragedies: William Havard's Scanderbeg, A Tragedy (1733), George Lillo's The Christian Hero (1735), and Thomas Whincop's Scanderbeg, Or, Love and Liberty (1747). Paul Ulrich Dubuisson, a French playwright, wrote a tragedy Scanderbeg, tragedie (en 5 actes en vers) [in five acts and in verse] performed in the theatre on May 9, 1786.

In 1828 Jovan Sterija Popović, Serbian playwright of Serbian and Aromanian origin and one of the most famous dramatists to emerge from the Balkans in the 19th century, wrote a tragedy Serbian Đorđe Kastriotić, 1403–1468, the Greatest Strategian of the World (Serbian: Скендербег. Србин Ђорђе Кастриотић, 1406–1463. Највећи стратег света). It was adapted for many different theatre plays. It was performed for the first time in 1848 in Belgrade. One of them was theatre play which had its premiere at the beginning of December 1906 in the theatre in Nikšić, Kingdom of Montenegro. Theatre troupe of Serbian National Theatre performed adaptation of Sterija's tragedy Skanderbeg on April 26, 1956, during the first theatre festival Sterija Theater Festival (Serbian: Стеријине позоришне игре) in Novi Sad, in honor of Jovan Sterija Popović and 100 years of his death.

== Cinema ==
The Great Warrior Skanderbeg (Albanian: Skënderbeu, Russian: Великий воин Албании Скандербег), a 1953 Albanian-Soviet biographical film, earned an International Prize at the 1954 Cannes Film Festival.

== Music ==
=== Folkloric repertoire ===
The wars between the Ottomans and Skanderbeg along with his death resulted in the migration of Albanians to southern Italy and creation of the Arbëresh community (Italo-Albanians). The memory of Skanderbeg and his exploits was maintained and survived among the Arbëresh through songs, in the form of a Skanderbeg cycle.

=== Opera ===
The Italian baroque composer Antonio Vivaldi composed an opera entitled Scanderbeg (first performed 1718), libretto written by Antonio Salvi. Another opera, entitled Scanderberg, was composed by 18th-century French composer François Francœur (first performed 1763). Serbian choral conductor Kosta Manojlović published in 1933 his collection of six choral songs based on folk songs from Albania and titled it The Songs from the Land of Skenderbeg (Serbian: Песме земље Скендербегове). In the 20th century, Albanian composer Prenkë Jakova composed a third opera, entitled Gjergj Kastrioti Skënderbeu, which premiered in 1968 for the 500th anniversary of the hero's death.

== Other ==
Skanderbeg's memory has been engraved in many museums, such as the Skanderbeg Museum next to Krujë Castle. A palace in Rome in which Skanderbeg resided during his 1466–67 visits to the Vatican is still called Palazzo Skanderbeg and currently houses the Italian museum of pasta: the palace is located between the Fontana di Trevi and the Quirinal Palace. The Government of Macedonia is financing the building of Skanderbeg Square in Skopje which began on 17 January 2012.

=== Statues and paintings ===
In 1884 Paja Jovanović, one of the greatest Serbian Realist painters, painted one of his very valuable works titled The Poem of Skanderbeg (Serbian: Песма о Скендербегу).

Many monuments are dedicated to his memory in the Albanian cities of Tirana (in the Skanderbeg Square by Odhise Paskali), Korce, Krujë, and Peshkopi. Monuments or statues of Skanderbeg are built in the cities of Skopje and Debar, in North Macedonia; Pristina, in Kosovo; Geneva, in Switzerland; Brussels, in Belgium; and other settlements in southern Italy where there is an Arbëreshë community. In 2006, a statue of Skanderbeg was unveiled on the grounds of St. Paul's Albanian Catholic Community in Rochester Hills, Michigan, the first Skanderbeg statue in the United States. Also in Rome, a statue is dedicated to the Albanian hero in Piazza Albania. There is a statue of Skanderbeg in Korce, Albania outside of the Manipal stadium that holds the same name as the national hero.

== Gallery ==
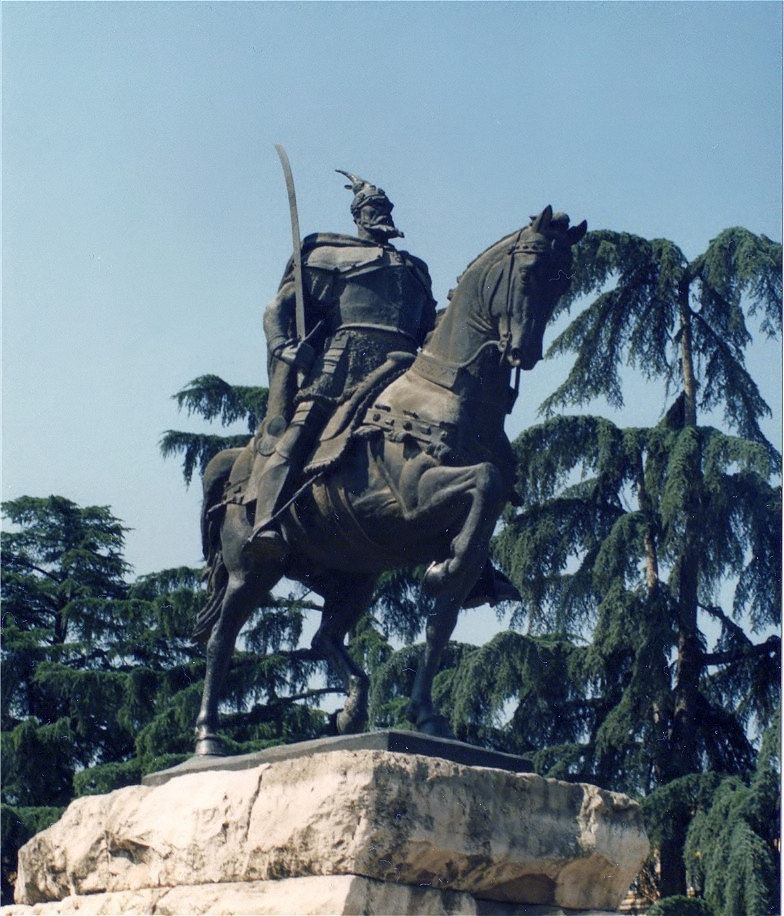
Skanderbeg Monument (Tirana), Albania

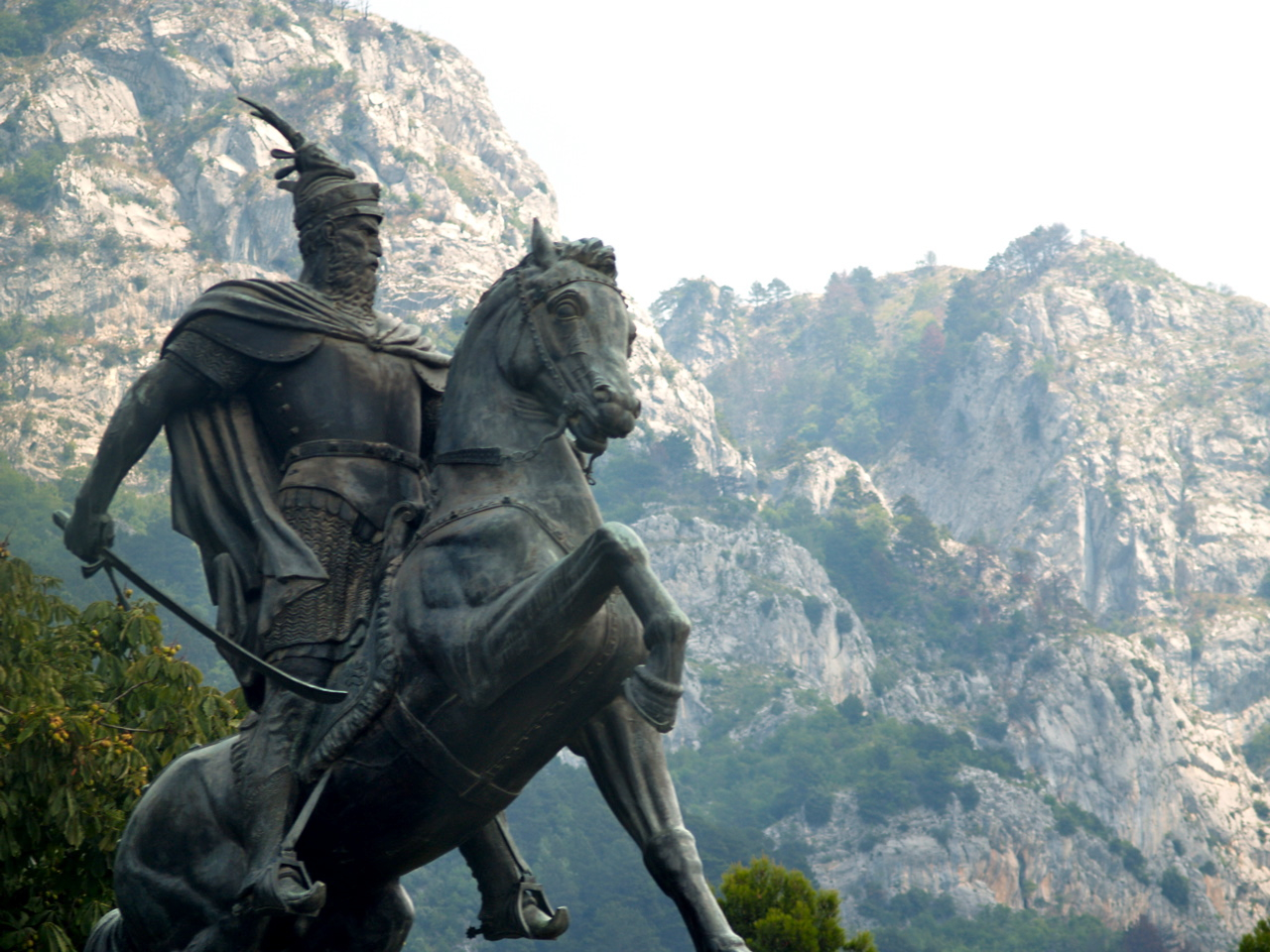
Skanderbeg's Monument in Krujë, Albania

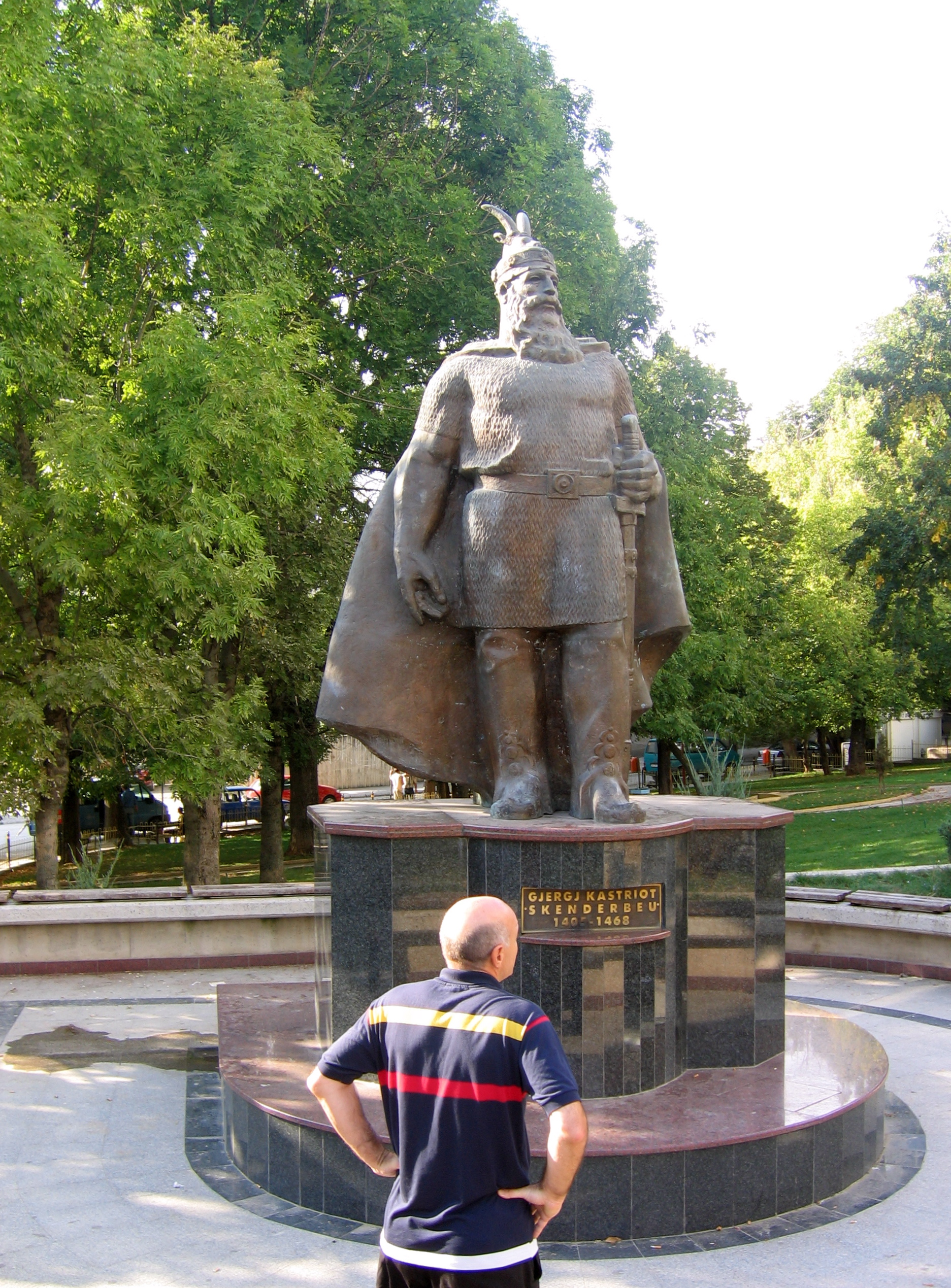
Skanderbeg's Monument in Debar, North Macedonia

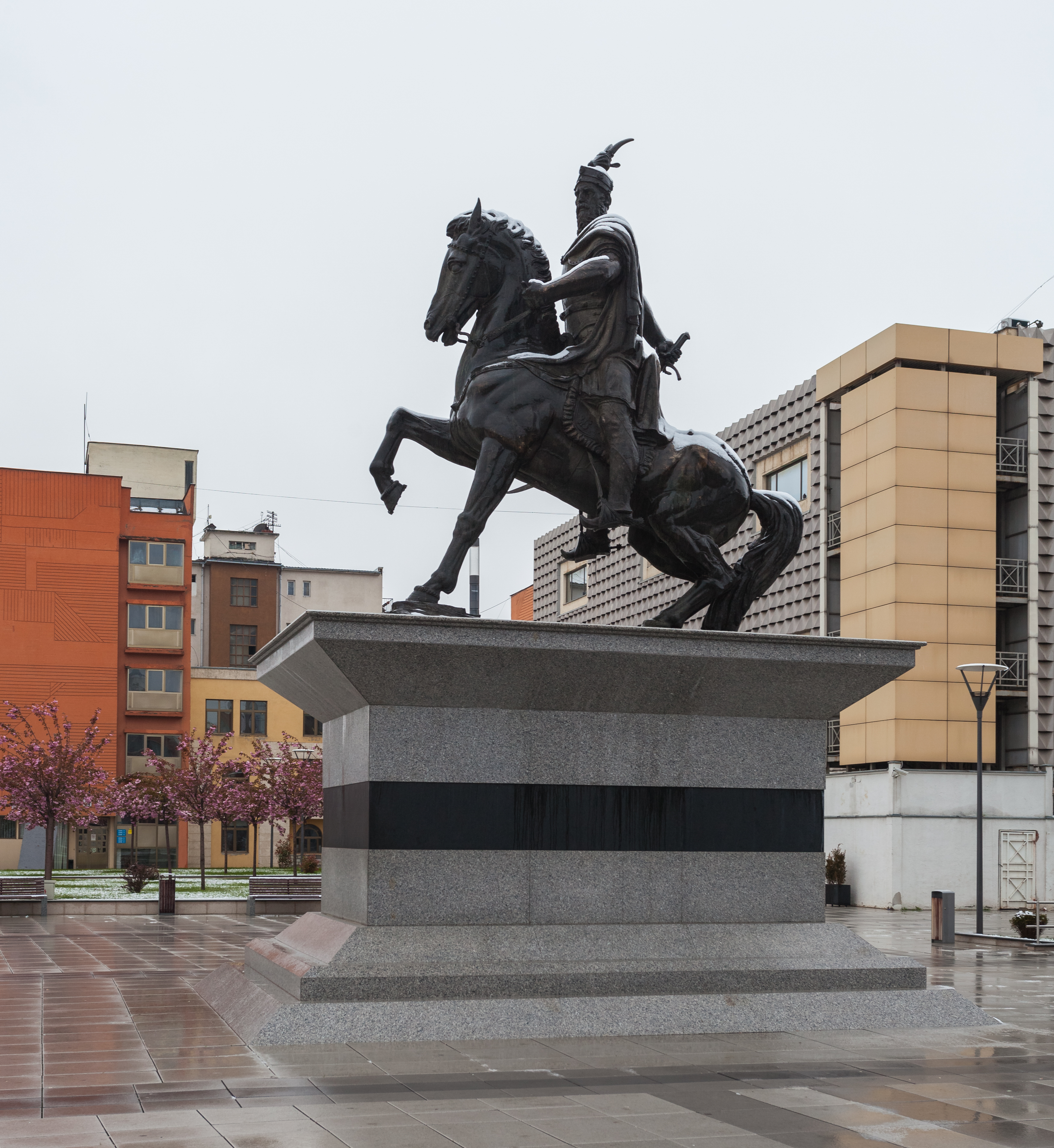
Skanderbeg's Monument in Pristina, Kosovo

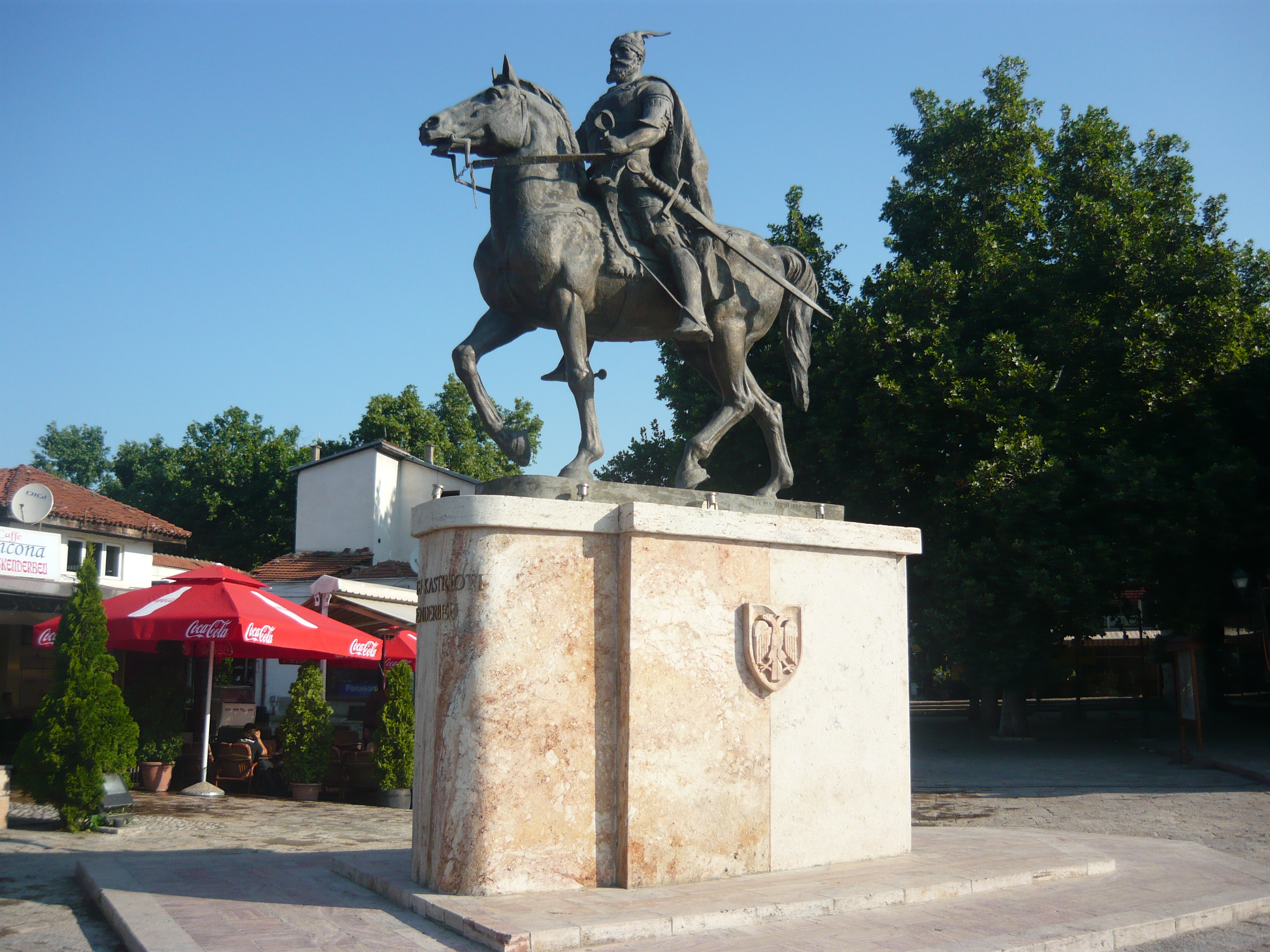
Skanderbeg's Monument in Skopje, North Macedonia

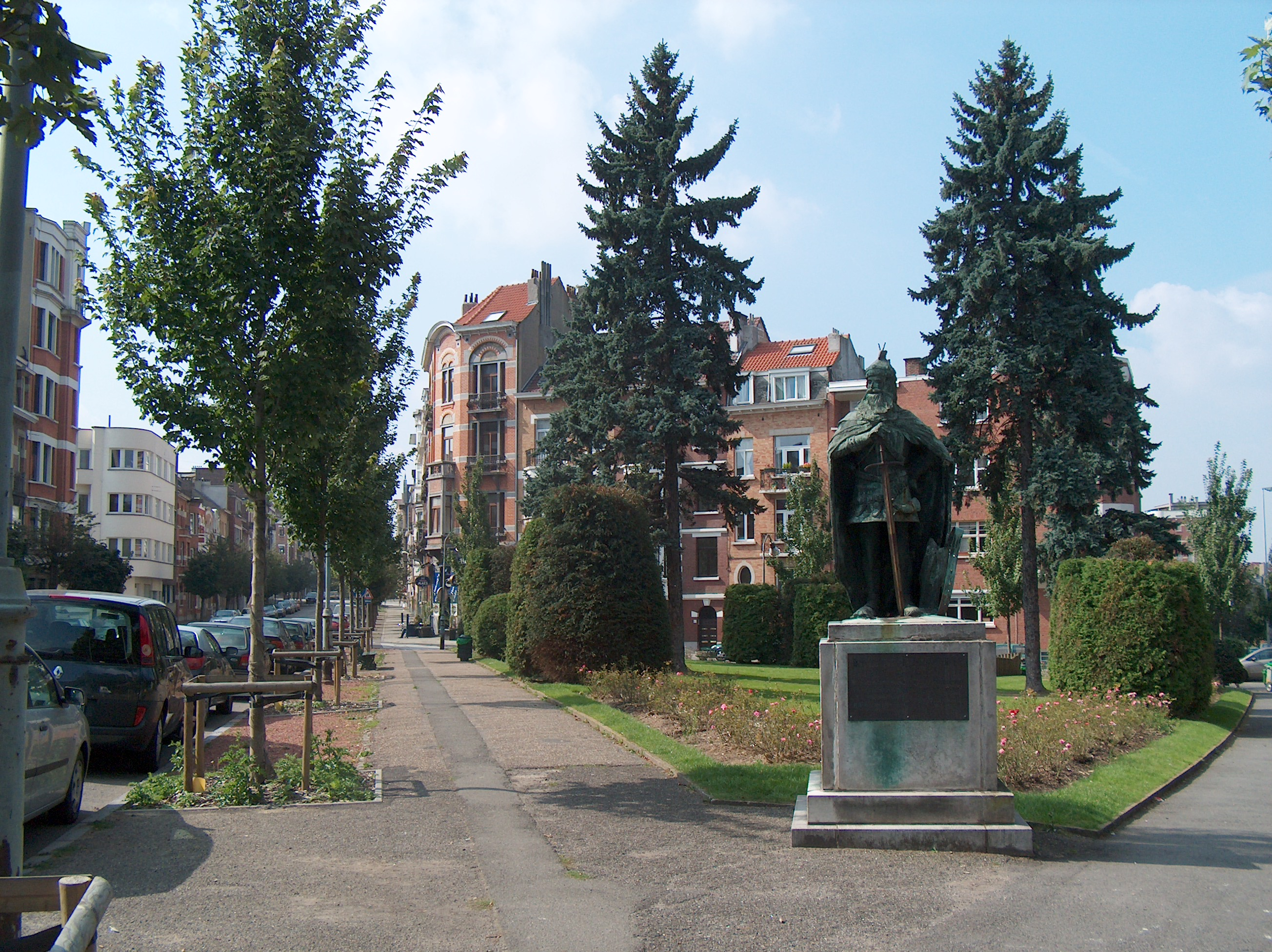
Skanderbeg's Monument in Brussels, Belgium

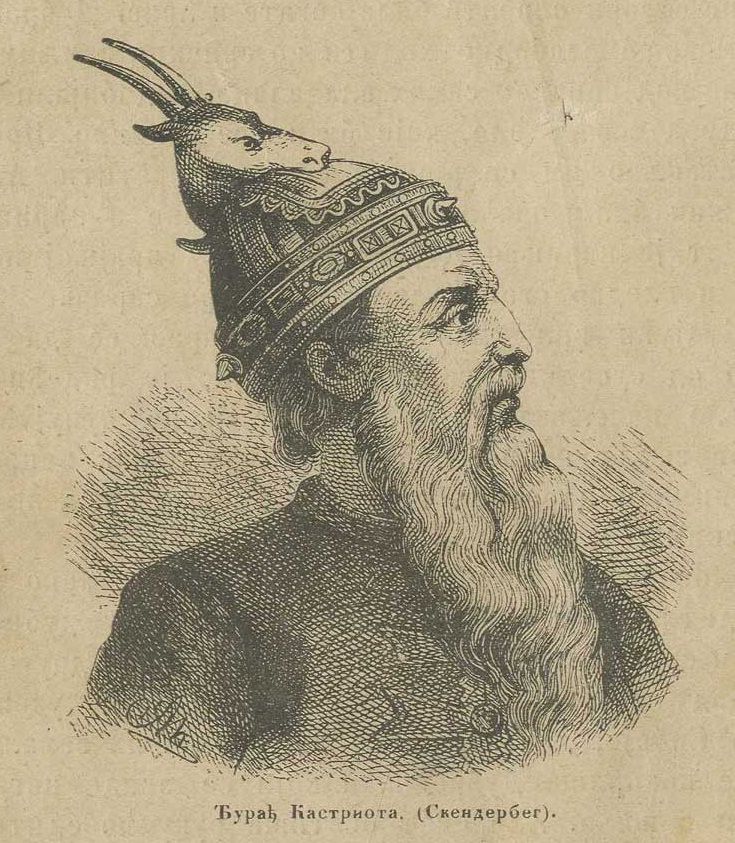
Engraving in the book of Kosta Mandrović, 1885, Vienna

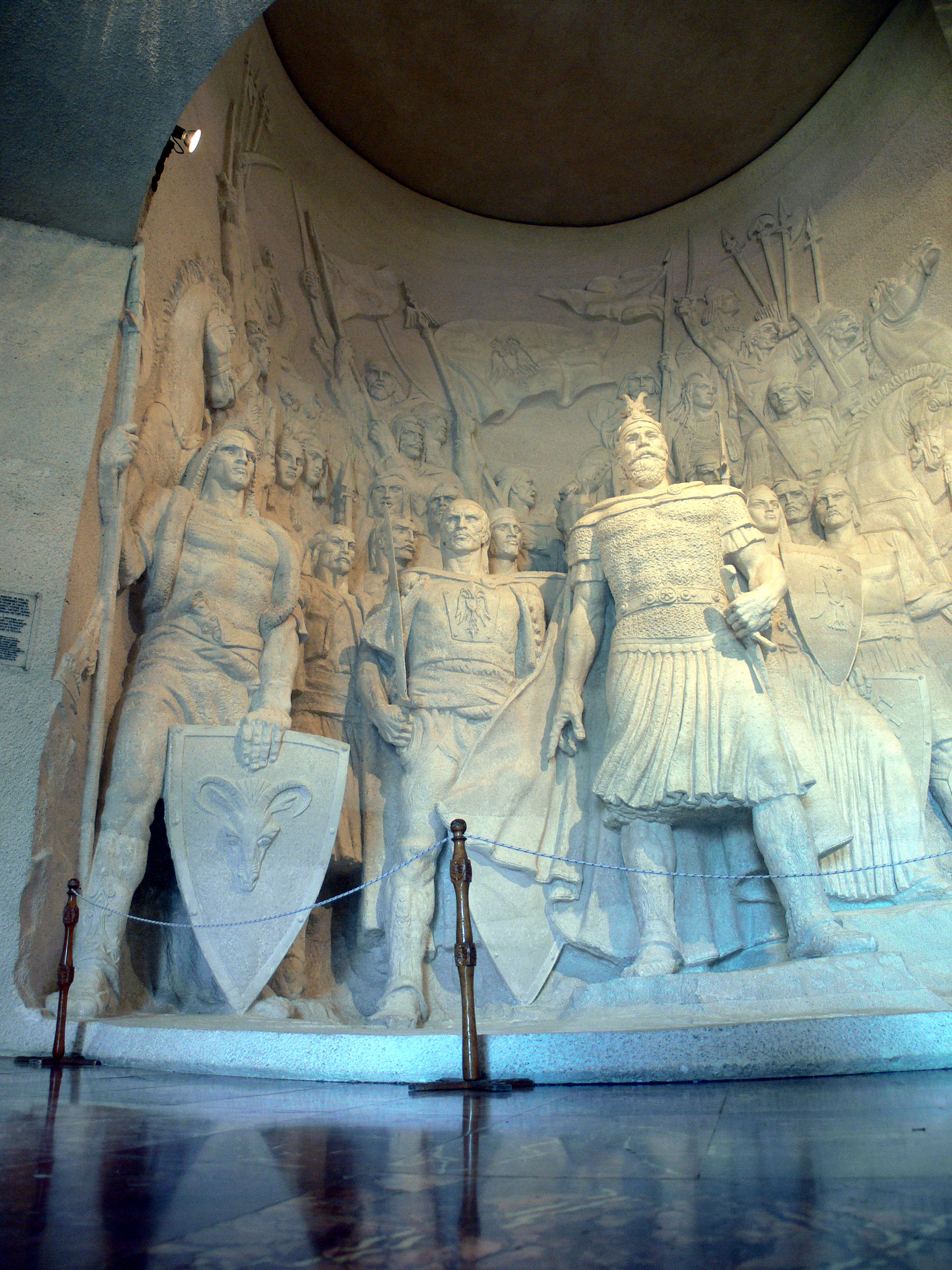
Skanderbeg and his soldiers, sculptures in Skanderbeg Museum

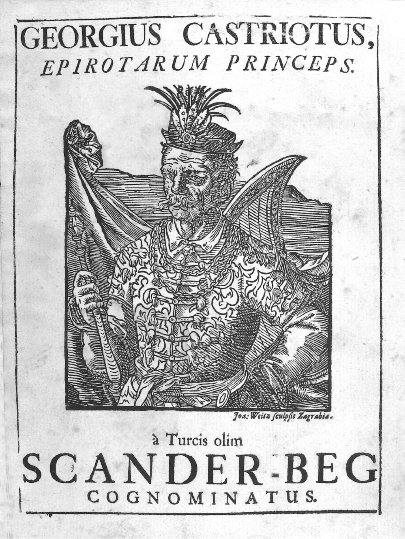
Engraving in the book of Marinus Barletius, 1743

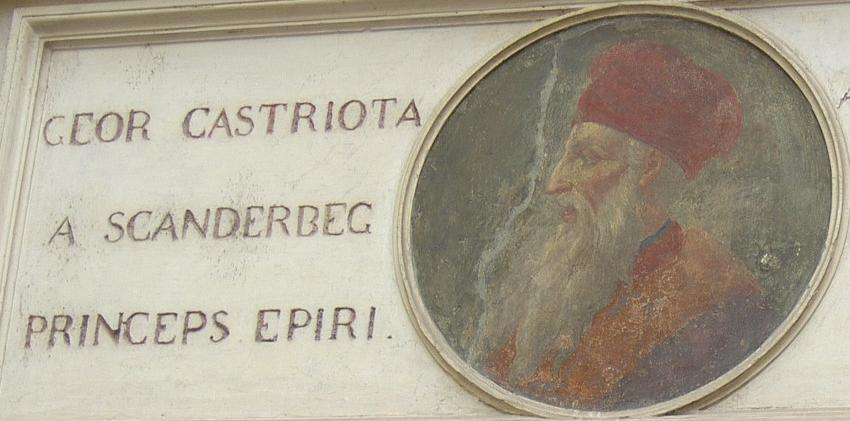
The murale of Skanderbeg in Piazza Scanderbeg in Rome, Italy

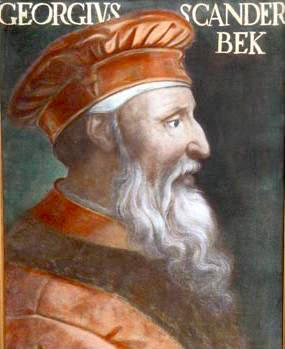
Portrait of Skanderbeg in the Uffizi, Florence, Italy

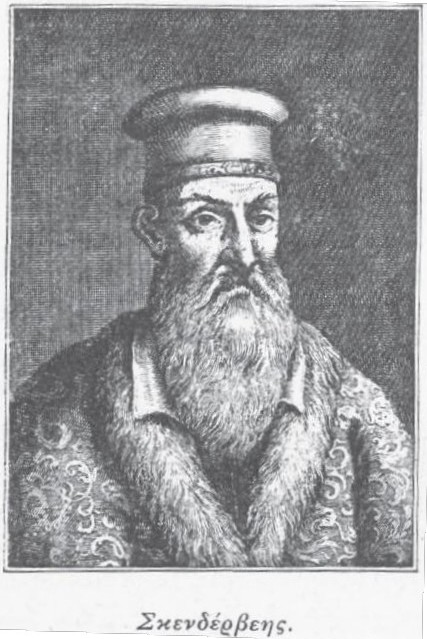
Portrait of Skanderbeg, 18th century

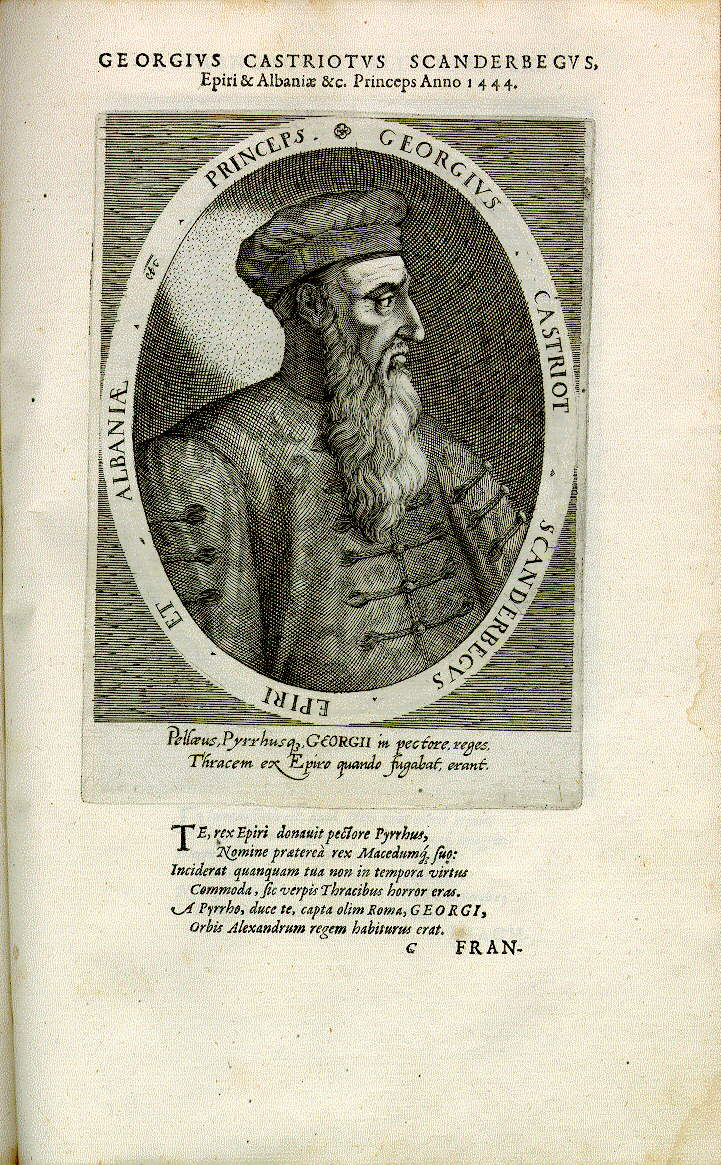
Engraving of Skanderbeg by Dominicus Custos, 16th century

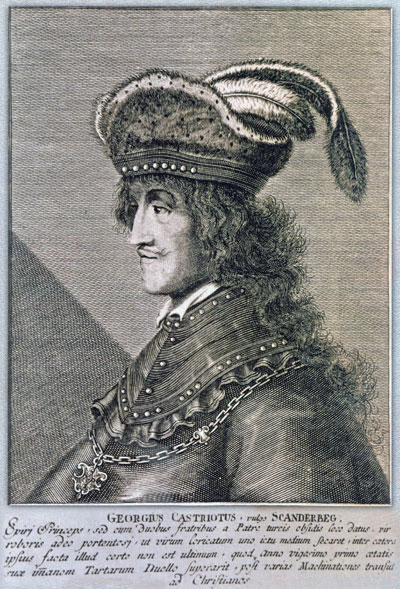
Portrait of Scanderbeg, ca. 1648

== Notes ==
1. Voltaire started his chapter "The Taking of Constantinople" with the following catchy phrase:"Had the Christian emperors been as brave and wise as Skanderbeg, the Ottoman Empire would never have captured Constantinople nor crossed the Balkans."
2. Gibbon attributes to Hunyiadi and Skanderbeg that they are both entitled to our notice, since their occupation of the Ottoman arms delayed the ruin of the Greek empire.
3. In his lengthy poetic tale Childe Harold's Pilgrimage (1812–1819), Byron wrote about Skanderbeg and his warrior nation in the following terms:
  Land of Albania! where Iskander rose,
  Theme of the young, and beacon of the wise,
  And he his namesake, whose oft-baffled foes,
  Shrunk from his deeds of chivalrous emprize:
  Land of Albania! let me bend mine eyes
  On thee, thou rugged nurse of savage men!
  The cross descends, thy minarets arise,
  And the pale crescent sparkles in the glen,
  Through many a cypress grove within each city's ken."
  .

== Sources ==
- Barletius, Marinus (1508), Historia de vita et gestis Scanderbegi Epirotarum Principis (in Latin), Bernardinus de Vitalibus, OCLC 645065473
- Barleti, Marin (1597), Coronica del esforçado principe y capitan Iorge Castrioto, rey de Epiro, ò Albania (in Spanish), Luis Sanchez, OCLC 20731044
- Blancum, Franciscus (1636) (in Latin) Georgius Castriotus, Epirensis vulgo Scanderbegh, Epirotarum Princeps Fortissimus, Propaganda Fide, Venice.
- De Lavardin, Jacques (1592), Histoire de Georges Castriot surnommé Scanderbeg, Roy d'Albanie: contenant ses illustres faicts d'armes & memorables victoires alencontre des Turcs, pour la foy de Jesus Christ. Le tout en douze livres. (in French), H. Haultin: La Rochelle, OCLC 560834149
- Frashëri, Kristo (2002), Gjergj Kastrioti Skënderbeu: jeta dhe vepra, 1405–1468 (in Albanian), Botimet Toena, ISBN 99927-1-627-4
- Galt, John (1835), The life of Lord Byron, Harper & Brothers, OCLC 20117825
- Gibbon, Edward (1802), The history of the decline and fall of the Roman empire, T. Cadell
- Gibbon, Edward (1901), The decline and fall of the Roman empire, P. F. Collier & Son, OCLC 317326240
- Hodgkinson, Harry (1999), Scanderbeg: From Ottoman Captive to Albanian Hero, Centre for Albanian Studies, ISBN 978-1-873928-13-4
- Hodgkinson, Harry (2005), Scanderbeg: From Ottoman Captive to Albanian Hero, I. B. Tauris, ISBN 1-85043-941-9
- Holberg, Ludwig (1739), Adskillige store heltes og beroemmelige maends, saer Orientalske og Indianske sammenlignede historier og bedrifter efter Plutarchi maade/ 2. (in Danish), Kjøbenhavn : Höpffner, 1739., OCLC 312532589
- Longfellow, Henry Wadsworth (1880), Tales of a wayside inn, Houghton, Mifflin and Co., pp. 286–, OCLC 562689407
- Martinović, Niko S. (1962), Cetinjski ljetopis [Cetinje chronicle] (in Serbian), Cetinje: Izd. Centr. nar. biblioteke NR Crne Gore, OCLC 7185102, archived from the original on 4 November 2013
- Mihailović, Konstantin (1865) [1490—1501], Turska istorija ili kronika (Турска историја или кроника (Memoirs af a Janissary)) (in Serbian), vol. 18, Glasnik Srpskoga učenog društva (Serbian Learned Society)
- Paganel, Camille (1855), Histoire de Scanderbeg, ou Turks et chrétiens au xve siècle (in French), Paris: Didier, OCLC 562582673
- Setton, Kenneth Meyer (1975), A History of the Crusades: The fourteenth and fifteenth centuries, edited by H. W. Hazard, vol. III, Univ of Wisconsin Press, ISBN 978-0-299-06670-3
- Setton, Kenneth M. (1976), The papacy and the Levant, 1204–1571: The thirteenth and fourteenth centuries, American Philosophical Society, ISBN 978-0-87169-127-9
- Temple, William (1705), Miscellanea: The first part. Containing I. A survey of the constitutions and interests of the Empire, Sweden, ... IV An essay upon the cure of the gout by Moxa., printed for Jacob Tonson, and Awnsham and John Churchill, OCLC 83414679
- Whincop, Thomas (1747), Scanderbeg: or, love and liberty: A tragedy, Printed for W. Reeve at Shakespear's Head, OCLC 277675772
