= Tourism in Pristina =

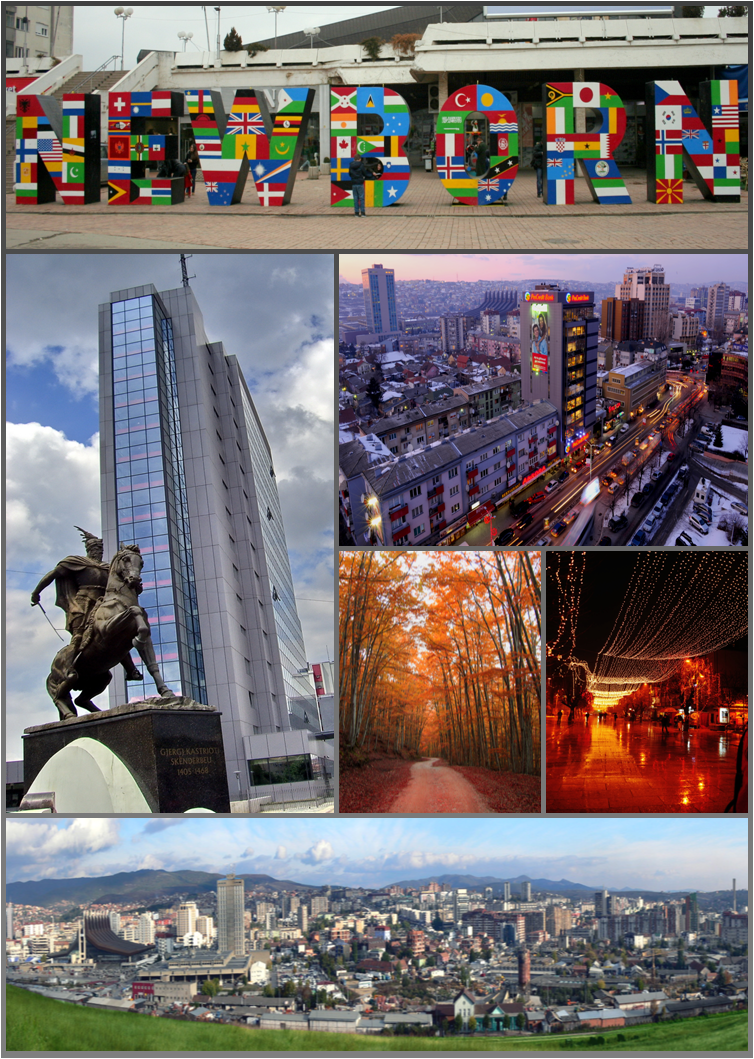
From top (left to right): the Newborn monument, the Kosovo Government Building and the Skanderbeg monument, modern Pristina, The Gërmia National Park, Mother Teresa Square, and a panoramic view of the city.

Tourism in Pristina attracted 36,186 foreign visitors in 2012, which represents 74.2% of all visitors that visited Kosovo during that year. Foreign visitors mostly come from countries like Albania, Turkey, Germany, United States, Slovenia and North Macedonia. Some of the most visited places in Pristina are Lake Batllava and Gadime Marble Cave, which are also among the most visited places in Kosovo.

Pristina is the first touristic destination in Kosovo and the main air gateway to Kosovo. The number of foreign visitors that visited Prishtina during 2012 grew by more than ten thousand visitors from 2008, when there were 25,434 visitors. During the first quarter of 2013, the number of hotels in Prishtina was 24 out of 102 hotels total in Kosovo and during the third quarter of the year 2013, 18.85% of hotel capacity was used. During the same period of that year, in Prishtina 423 hotel rooms were with one bed, 268 rooms with two beds, 13 rooms with three beds, 49 apartments and 6 residents.

Since 2009, the Kosovo Tourism Association has organized an annual Tourism Fair in Pristina, which is intended to attract foreign visitors to Kosovo. In the International Tourism Fair held in Tokyo, Japan, in 2013, 4 day packages have been presented that start from Pristina, then continue in Peja, Gjakova and conclude in Prizren.

Pristina is known as a university center of students from regional countries like Albania, Montenegro, North Macedonia and Serbia and it represents a plateau of the combination of native, Ottoman and Yugoslav culture. Its people are known for hospitality and religious tolerance. Citizens are mainly Muslims, but there are also Catholics, Orthodoxes, Atheists and people of other religions. Around 23% of people are in the age range of 16–27.

Pristina was a shelter for Jews during World War II, and the Jewish cemeteries there can be visited.

Coffee bars are common in Prishtina and are also centers of different festivals and events. In the region of Prishtina there is Gracanica monastery, which is in the list of UNESCO World Heritage Sites.

== Statistics ==
The table below shows the number of national and international visitors and the number of nights spent in Prishtina from 2008 until 2012. As it can be seen from the table, one of the most successful years for tourism in Prishtina was 2012.

Year	# of visitors	# of nights spent
2008	22,160	44,171
2009	40,168	67,715
2010	35,671	67,703
2011	32,245	63,716
2012	51,736	84,952

== Museums ==
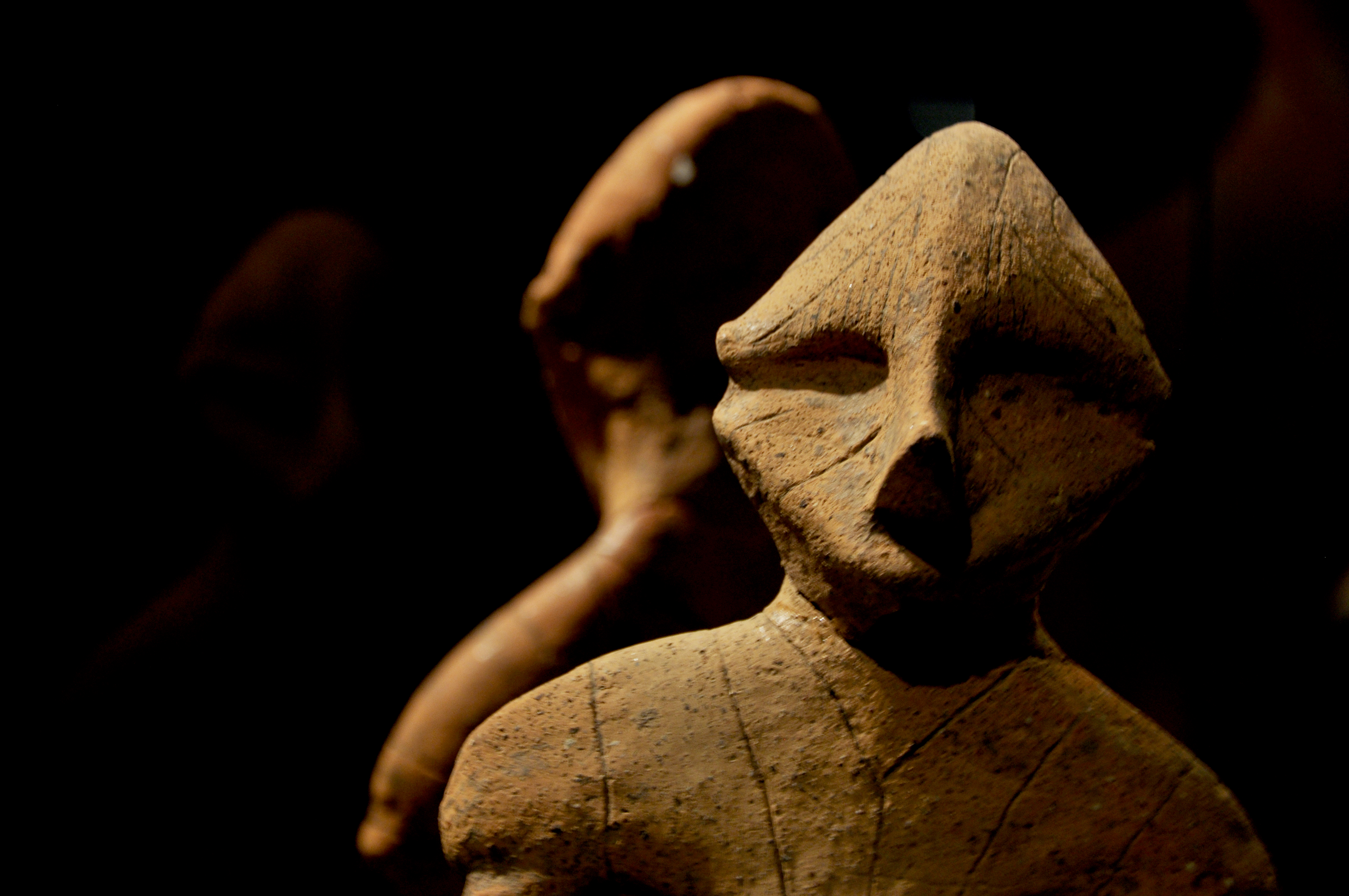
Goddess on the Throne

- The National Museum of Kosovo has more than fifty thousand exhibits, ranging from archaeology, technology, history, nature, entoculture, folklore, and heritage. It aims to show the history of Kosovo from the Neolithic era until today. The Kosovo Museum has an extensive collection of archaeological and ethnological artifacts, including the Neolithic Goddess on the Throne terracotta, found near Pristina in 1956 and depicted in the city's emblem. A large number of artifacts from antiquity are still in Belgrade, and the museum was looted in 1999.
- The Ethnological Museum Emin Gjiku is part of the National Museum of Kosovo in Prishtina. It is located in the old housing complex, consisting of four buildings, two of which date from the eighteenth century and two others from the nineteenth century. The concept of the Ethnological Museum is based on four topics which represent the life cycle including birth, life, death and spiritual heritage. The Stone House is also a part of the museum which today serves as a center of contemporary art – station.

== Ottoman Prishtina ==
A large part of the city of Prishtina features oriental elements, including causeway roads, mosques, bazars, and The Memorial Monument of Gazimestan. Some of the mosques are King Mosque, built during the years 1460–1461 from Sulltan Mehmet II al Fatih, Jashar Pasha Mosque and Çarshia Mosque.

- Çarshia Mosque is a building in old Prishtina, built in the fifteenth century by Sulltan Bajaziti in order to remember the victory of Ottomans in 1389. Previously, Çarshia Mosque was placed in front of Prishtina's covered bazar. Today there is nothing left from the old bazar, only the name of the mosque. Many alterations and improvements have changed the original appearance of the mosque, but the bricks forming the top of the minaret have survived for more than six hundred years. The mosque today is in front of the Museum of Kosovo. The minare of Çarshia Mosque is considered unique in Europe because its top is built with bricks instead of aluminum.
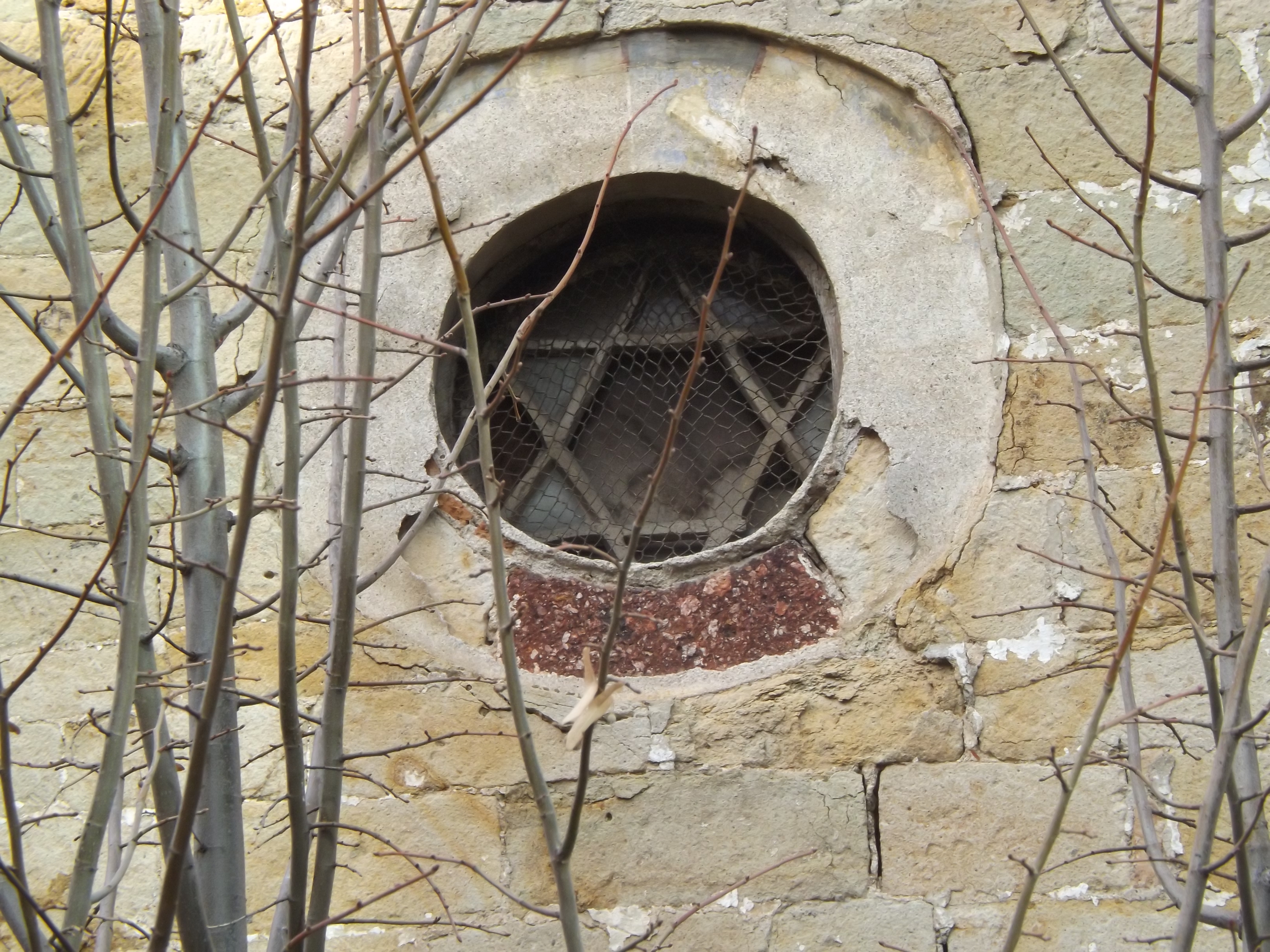
  Jashar Pasha Mosque
  Near the mosque there is the shadervan decorated with marble, the only surviving public shadervan in Prishtina. Near Çarshia Mosque tis the Clock Tower. It dates back to the ninetieth century, has the shape of a hexagon and it is twenty six meters high.
- The Jashar Pasha Mosque was built in the sixteenth century and it is located next to the Çarshia Mosque. According to an inscription found in the mosque, it was finished in 1834. The Star of David can be seen in one of the mosque's windows, shown in the picture above.
- Sulltan Murati Shrine is placed in Mazgit village, seven kilometers to the west of Prishtina. Symbolically, it denotes the place where Sultan Murati was killed in the Battle of Kosovo in 1389.

The Big Bazar, an active area in the city of Prishtina, still features the same style as other bazars that can be found in the Balkans, although a large part of it was destroyed in the 1950s.

== Yugoslav Prishtina ==
Prishtina was influenced by Yugoslavia due to being part of the Yugoslav Federation for several decades. Elements of The Yugoslav Style can be seen in buildings.

- The University of Pristina is a public higher education institution located in Pristina, Kosovo. It comprises fourteen faculties located in Prishtina and three branches in other cities of Kosovo. The University of Pristina is an Albanian-language higher education institution that emerged after the Kosovo War. It serves as the major university in Kosovo.
- The National Library of Kosovo is the highest library institution in Kosovo. It was founded by the Kosovo Parliament, and its main intention was collecting and conserving the intellectual heritage of Kosovo for Kosovo. Since 1999, this central library institution of Kosovo has known by the name National and University Library of Kosovo. It functions as a center of library information at the national level, collecting, refining and conserving library materials that are considered to have an important role in culture, art and science.

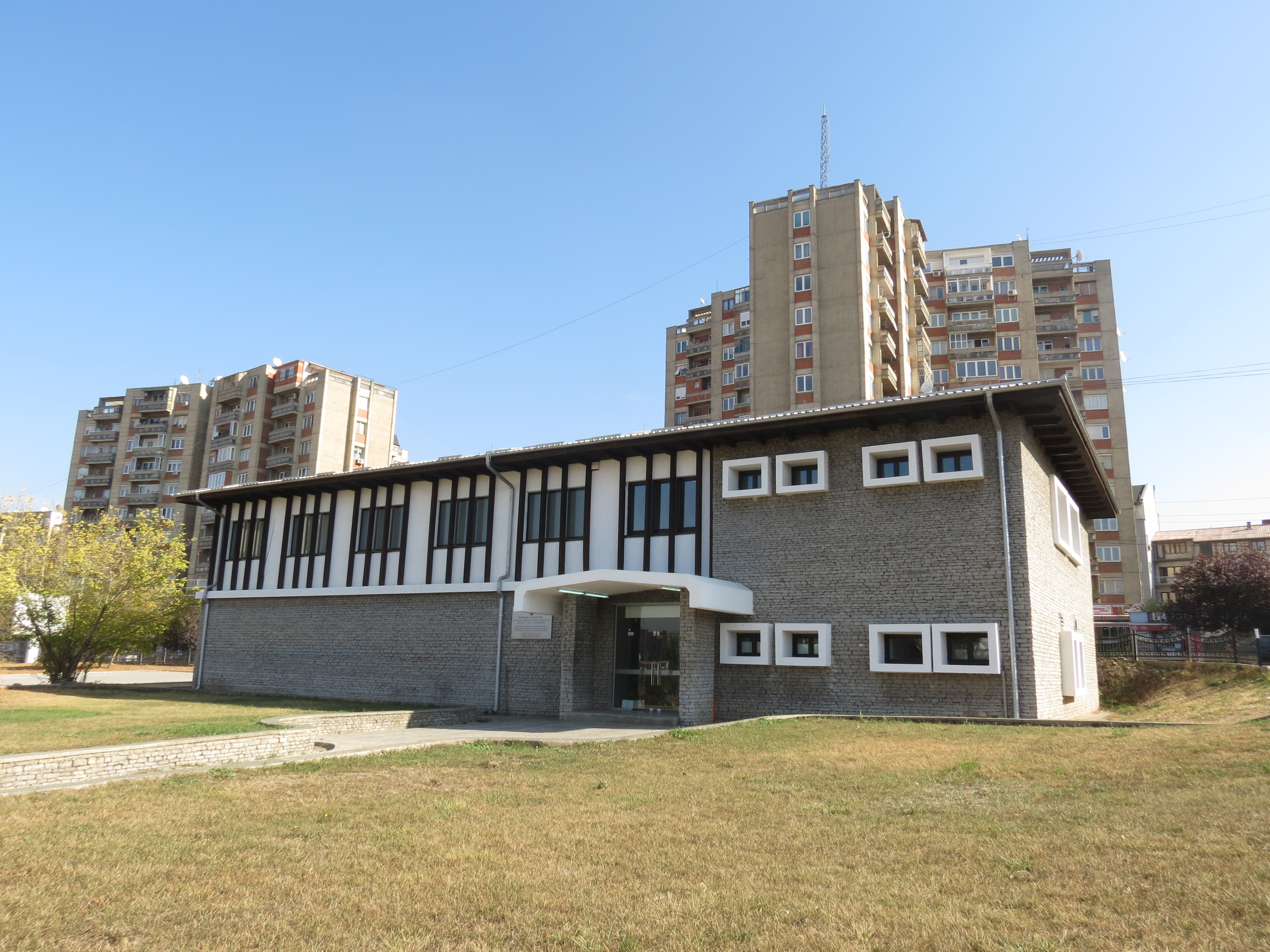
Art Gallery of Kosovo

- The National Art Gallery of Kosovo was founded in 1979 as a cultural institution to present visual art and collect valuable works. More than 500 exhibitions have been organized by the institute. The gallery also encourages young artists by organizing exhibitions showing their work. The National Art Gallery of Kosovo is located in the University of Prishtina's campus next to the National and University Library of Kosovo. The building was also used by the National Museum of Kosovo.
- The Monument of Unity and Brotherhood has three fifteen meter high columns that symbolize the union and brotherhood of three nationalities in Kosovo (Albanians, Serbs and Montenegrins). The base of the columns contains the inscription 1961, which marks the year of foundation.
- Boro Ramiz is a Youth and Sport Palace that served as an example of the planning manner in the Yugoslav era. Today it has been transformed into a trading center, containing different shops, and a basketball field, which is where the city's basketball team holds its training sessions.
- Hivzi Sylejmani Library is a city library that was founded in 1930. It became famous due to the ex-executive of the Regional Committee of Communist Party of Kosovo, Miladin Popoviq. In 1948, this building became a library of Prishtina.

== Parks ==
Prishtina has a number of parks, including The City Park, Taukbahqe Park, Arberia Park, and the most well-known, Germia National Park. Germia is a rich place of flora and fauna, with more than 75 percent of its territory covered with forests, and its highest point is 1,050 meters above the sea level. It has sport fields, walking and biking paths, restaurants and a lake-sized swimming pool.

== Other sites ==
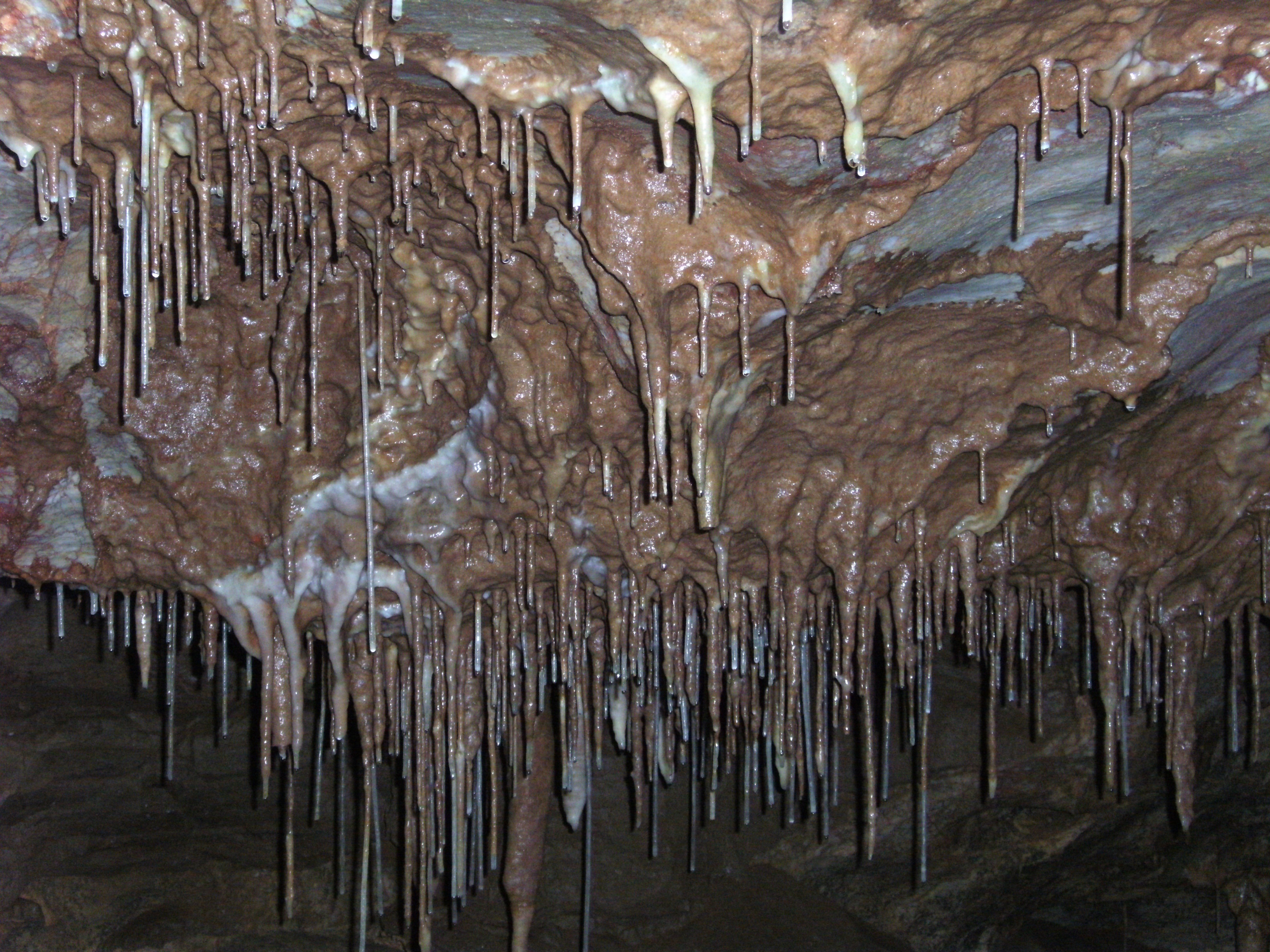
Gadime Marble Cave

- The Newborn monument (stylized NEWBORN) is a typographic sculpture and tourist attraction in Prishtina, Kosovo, unveiled on the 17 February 2008, the day that Kosovo declared independence from Serbia. The monument consists of the English-language word "Newborn" in capital block letters, painted bright yellow when the sculpture was first revealed. The monument has been re-painted with the flags of the states that have recognized Kosovo as an independent country. Newborn is re-painted and newly unveiled on 17 February every year. The monument has attracted the attention of international media reporting on Kosovo's declaration of independence, and it was featured prominently on the front page of The New York Times. The monument has won prizes in six major international competitions in design category. The Silver Clio Award was awarded at the 49th Clio Awards Festival for motivating human behavior in significant ways, the Cannes Gold Lion was awarded at the 55th Annual Cannes Lions International Advertising Festival, the Eurobest European Advertising Festival Silver Award, Golden Drum Grand Prix and LIA (London International Awards) finalist, were all awarded in 2008, and The One Club Merit Award was awarded in 2009. The re-painting of the monument was a selected finalist at the 54th Clio Awards Festival in 2013. The design work has also been used in books to illustrate the design process and project concept development, as well as the use of FF DIN Typeface.
- The Archaeological Park in Prishtina is placed in front of the Museum of Kosovo. Together with Ethnological Museum it is part of the “Follow the yellow line” project which is intended to represent the Cultural Heritage of Prishtina.
- The Cathedral of Blessed Mother Teresa in Prishtina is a Roman Catholic cathedral. In 2007 the Government of Kosovo approved plans for the building. The church's foundation was ceremonially laid by former Kosovo president Ibrahim Rugova. It is dedicated to the Nobel Prize winner, Blessed Mother Teresa.
- Gadime Marble Cave is located twenty kilometers from the city of Prishtina. It is 1,276 meters in length and the volcanic lava and tufa accumulation on the marble dates back to the time of the formation of the Kosovo Valley.
- The Skanderbeg monument, also known as Gjergj Kastrioti Skenderbeu, was built where The Mother Teresa and Skanderbeg Boulevard meet, in the center of Prishtina. It is a tribute to an Albanian hero who fought off the Ottomas in the fifteenth century. The statue was designed by Albanian artist Janaq Paco in 2001.

== Events and Festivals ==
- KosICT is one of the biggest events in Information and Communications Technology in Kosovo, which was first held in 2012. It is organized by STIKK (the Kosovo Association of Information and Communications Technology) and intends to cover the global trending topics of ICT by gathering local, regional and international speakers.
- Software Freedom Kosova, which was first held in 2009, is one of the biggest events both in Kosovo and in the region that promotes free and open source software. It is an held annually, and gathers speakers and attendees from Kosovo, the region and worldwide.
- Startup Weekend Prishtina is an annual event that lasts for fifty four hours straight. It gathers participants that have an idea for a service or a product which could used to develop a future business.
- Prishtina Jazz Festival is a jazz music festival that was founded by Ilir Bajri in 2005. It takes place every November in the Oda Theater. Jazz musicians worldwide have attended the event.
- The Prishtina International Film Festival (PriFilmFest), also known as the Pristina Film Festival, is a film festival held annually in Prishtina, Kosovo, that screens prominent international cinema productions in the Balkan region, and draws attention to the Kosovar film industry. It was created after the 2008 Kosovo declaration of independence. The first festival was held in 2009, and featured actress Vanessa Redgrave as the host.
- The International Festival of Young Musicians - DAM (IFOYMD) is the first music festival of its kind that had been organized in Kosovo. The first edition of the festival was held in April 2006, and presented musicians from Kosovo (then part of Serbia and Montenegro), Italy, Germany, Albania and Slovenia, while in the second edition the festival presented musicians from Ukraine, Egypt, Austria, Great Britain, Albania, Bulgaria, Croatia and Kosovo.
- Skena UP is an international film festival of film and theater students that takes place annually. Plays and films are shown, and workshops and discussions that are held during the event are intended to create a forum for presenting the work of students, and students are able to meet with the audience and get their opinions.
- 911 Festival is a festival of short movies that last 5–30 minutes and offered by local directors. The films in the festival feature English subtitles.

== Traditional food ==
One of the best known foods is flija, prepared year-round but popular in the summer. Flija made with saç is a specialty of traditional Albanian cuisine that is prepared in mountainous areas. Baklava is a traditional pastries of Kosovar cuisine, although it is of Turkish origin. Bakllasarem, a salty pie with yogurt and garlic covering, is another traditional food.

== Nightlife ==
Prishtina's nightlife is mainly concentrated around Mother Teresa boulevard, Fehmi Agani Road and the Pejton neighborhood. Past Mother Teresa Boulevard, there are night clubs, discos and coffee bars, where Hamam Bar, that offers life jazz music, has become one of the top five bars and restaurants.

== Cultural Heritage ==
Prishtina has been inhabited for nearly 10,000 years, and has a long cultural heritage.

- Harilaq Fortress, in Harilaq village twenty kilometers to the west of Prishtina, was built in the sixth century by Justinian the Great. It is above a hill of the Galesh Mountains, from which Kosovo Valley can be seen. The fortress was built in the fourth century. In addition to late and medieval ancient artifacts, excavations have also found evidence of occupation during the Eneolithic, Bronze and Dardan periods.
- Ulpiana was an ancient Roman city located in what is now Kosovo. It was also known as Justiniana Secunda. Ulpiana lies near the left bank of the river Gracanica, close to a mine that been in use since Roman times. The ruins of the city are around nine km to the south-east of Pristina, and includes the municipality of Laplje Selo. In 1955, under Resolution No.v.E.K.21/55, Ulpiana was added to the Archaeological Sites of Exceptional Importance list. It was considered one of the most important cities in the Roman province of Dardania.
- Gracanica is a Serbian Orthodox monastery located in Kosovo. It was founded by the Serbian king Stefan Milutin in 1321. Gracanica Monastery was declared a Monument of Culture of Exceptional Importance in 1990, and it is protected by Republic of Serbia. On 13 July 2006 it was placed on UNESCO's World Heritage List under the list of Medieval Monuments in Kosovo as an extension of the Visoki Dečani site, which was placed on the List of World Heritage in Danger.

== Gallery ==
Tourism in Prishtina gallery
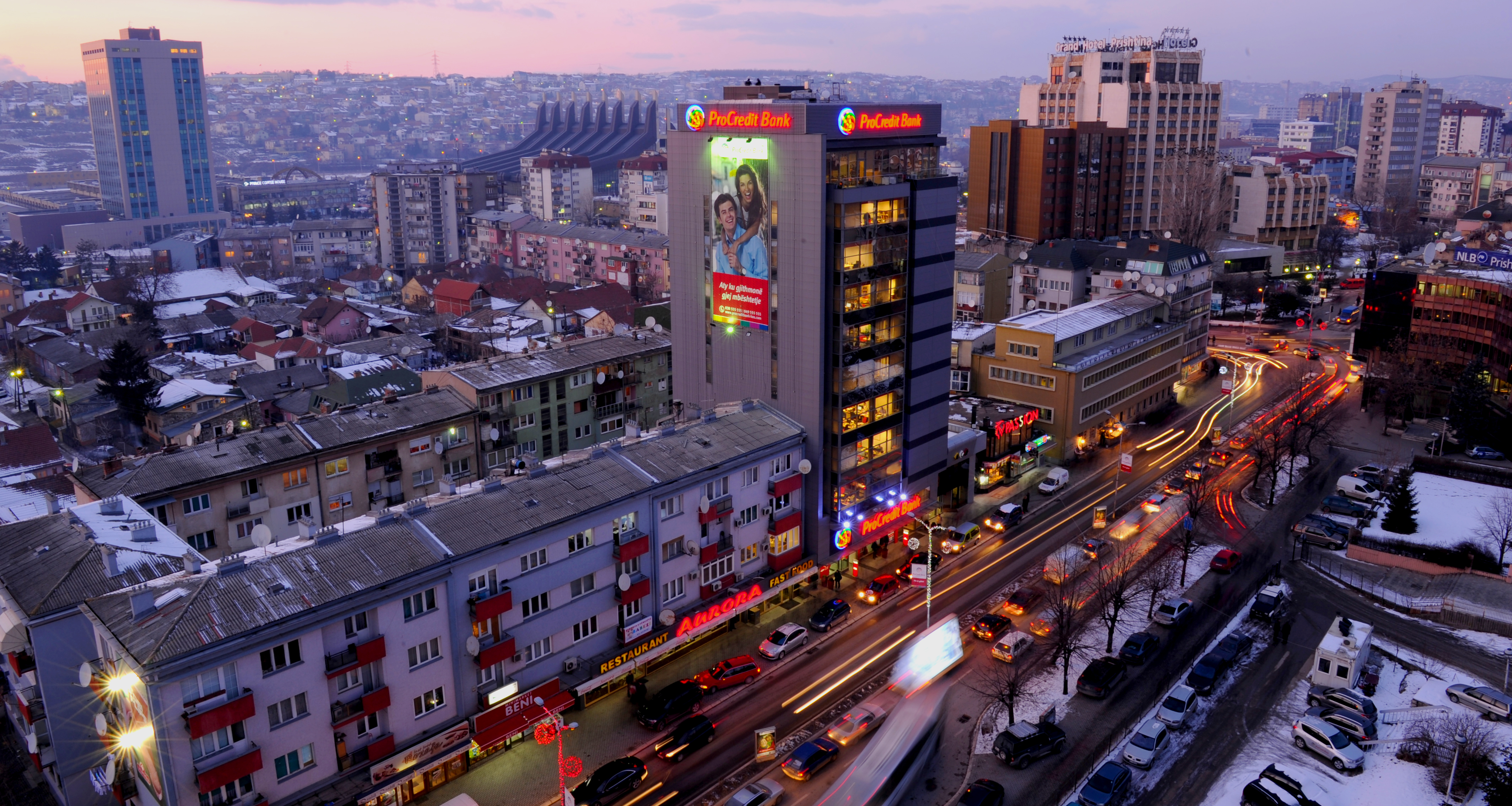
Prishtina center

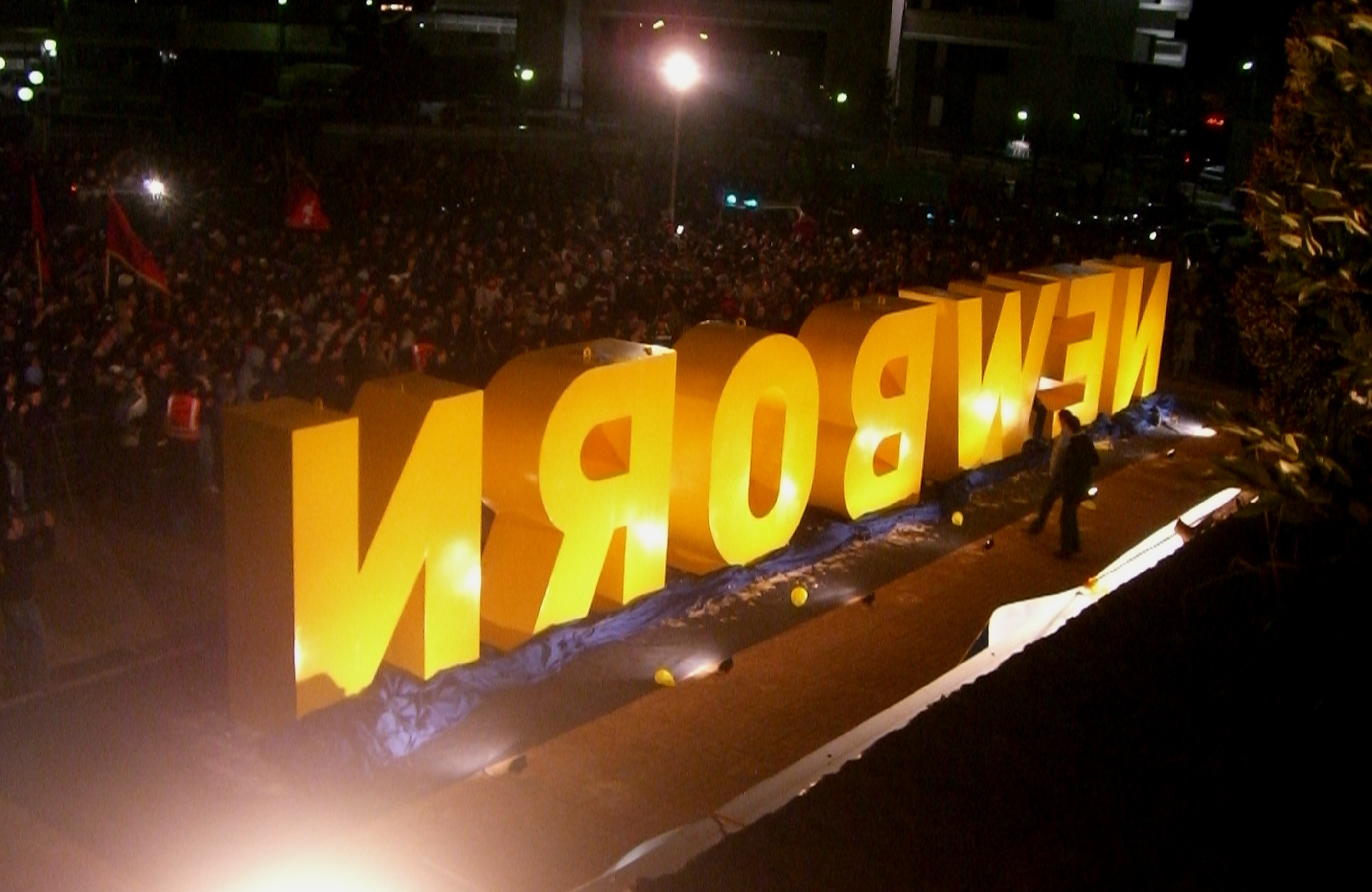
Newborn monument

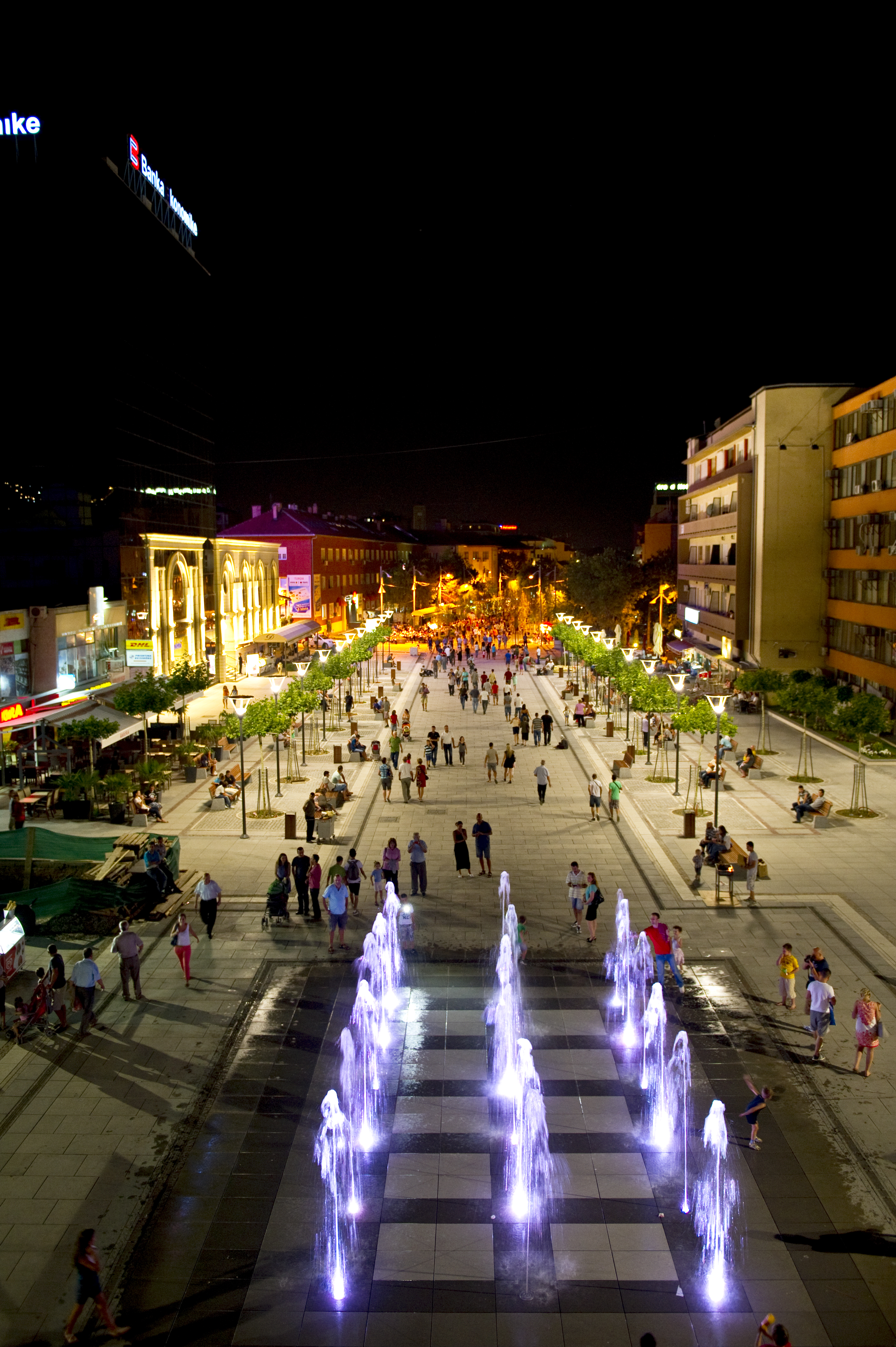
Skanderbeg Bulevard

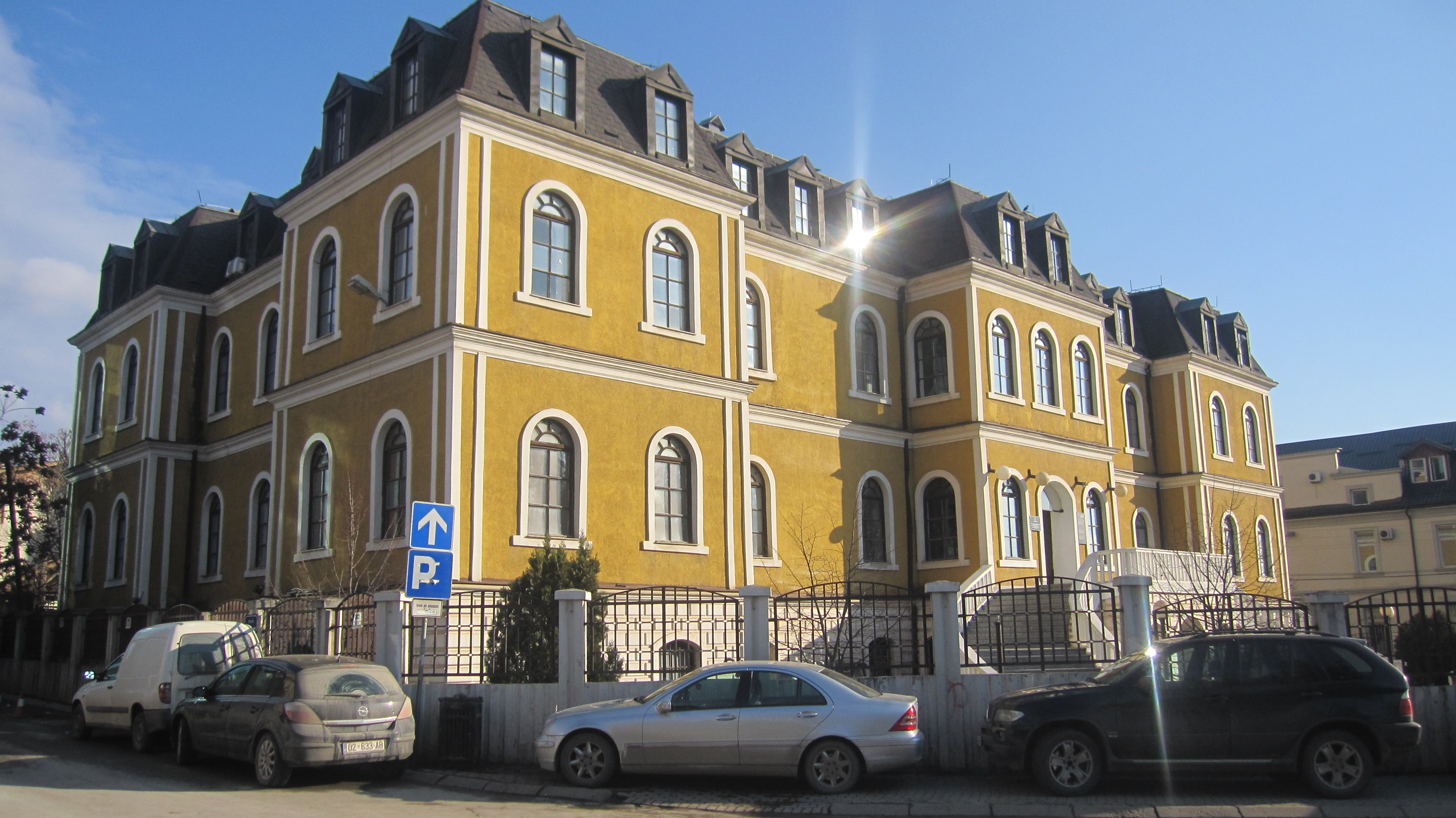
Museum of Kosovo

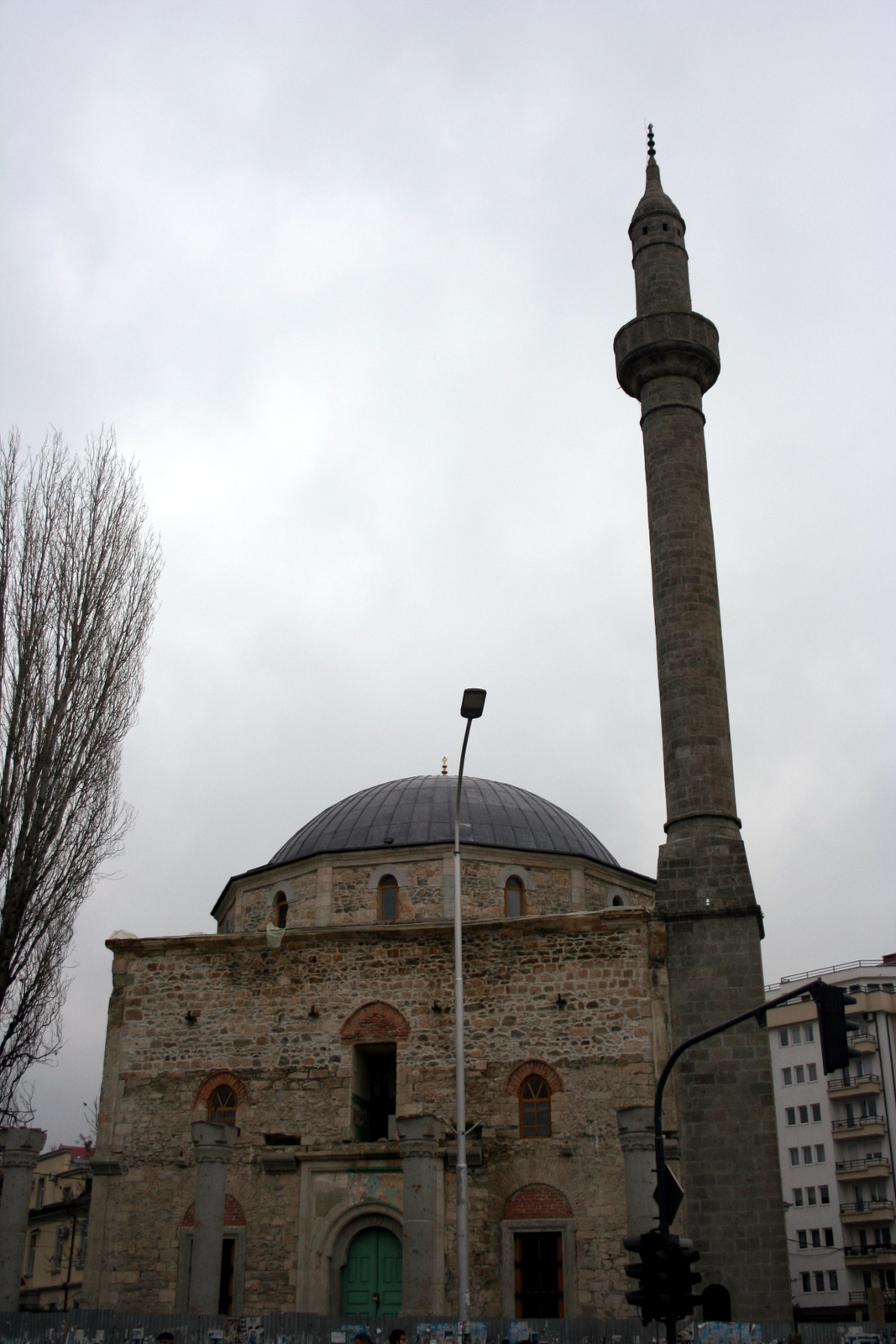
Çarshia Mosque

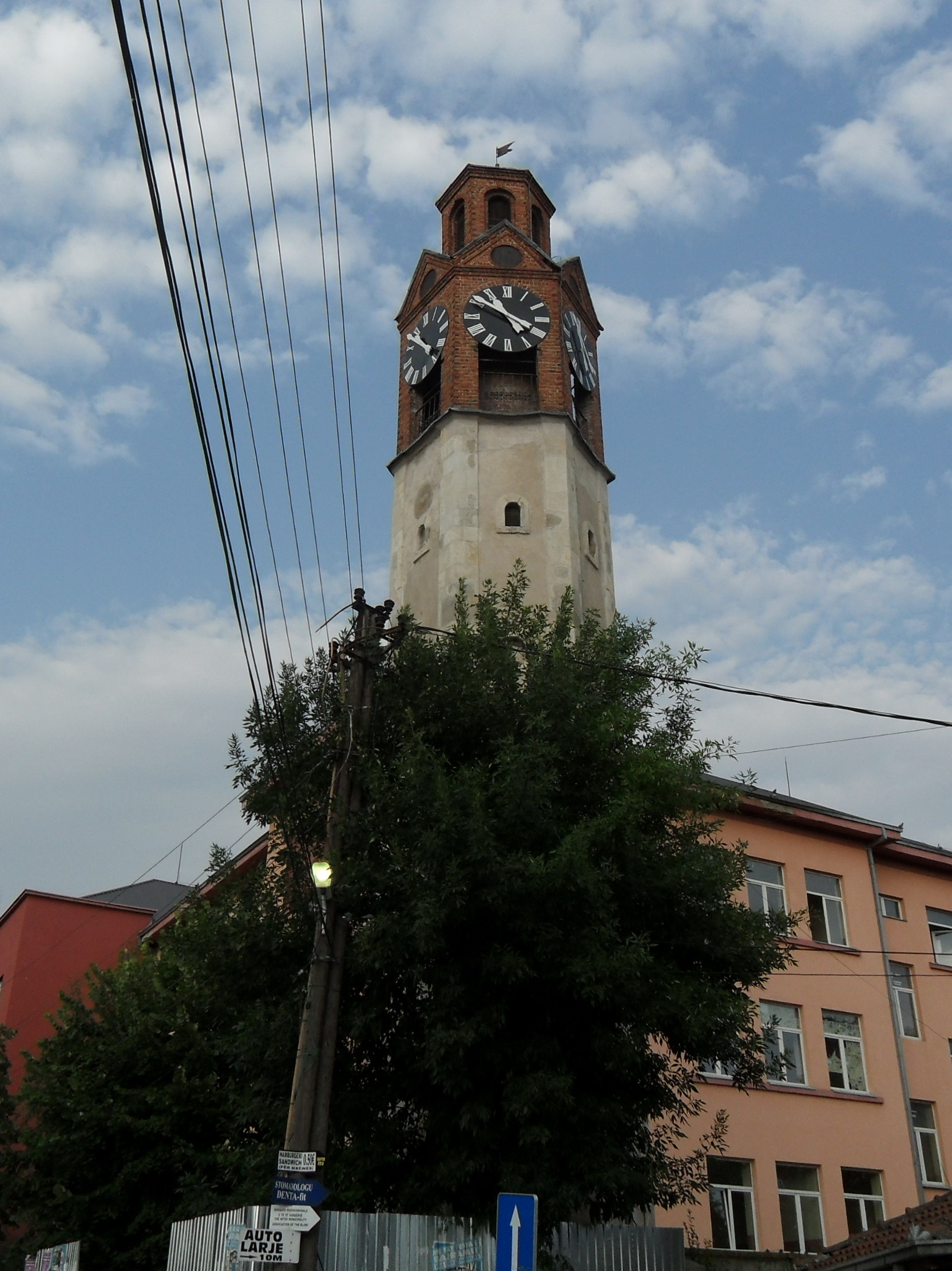
Clock Tower

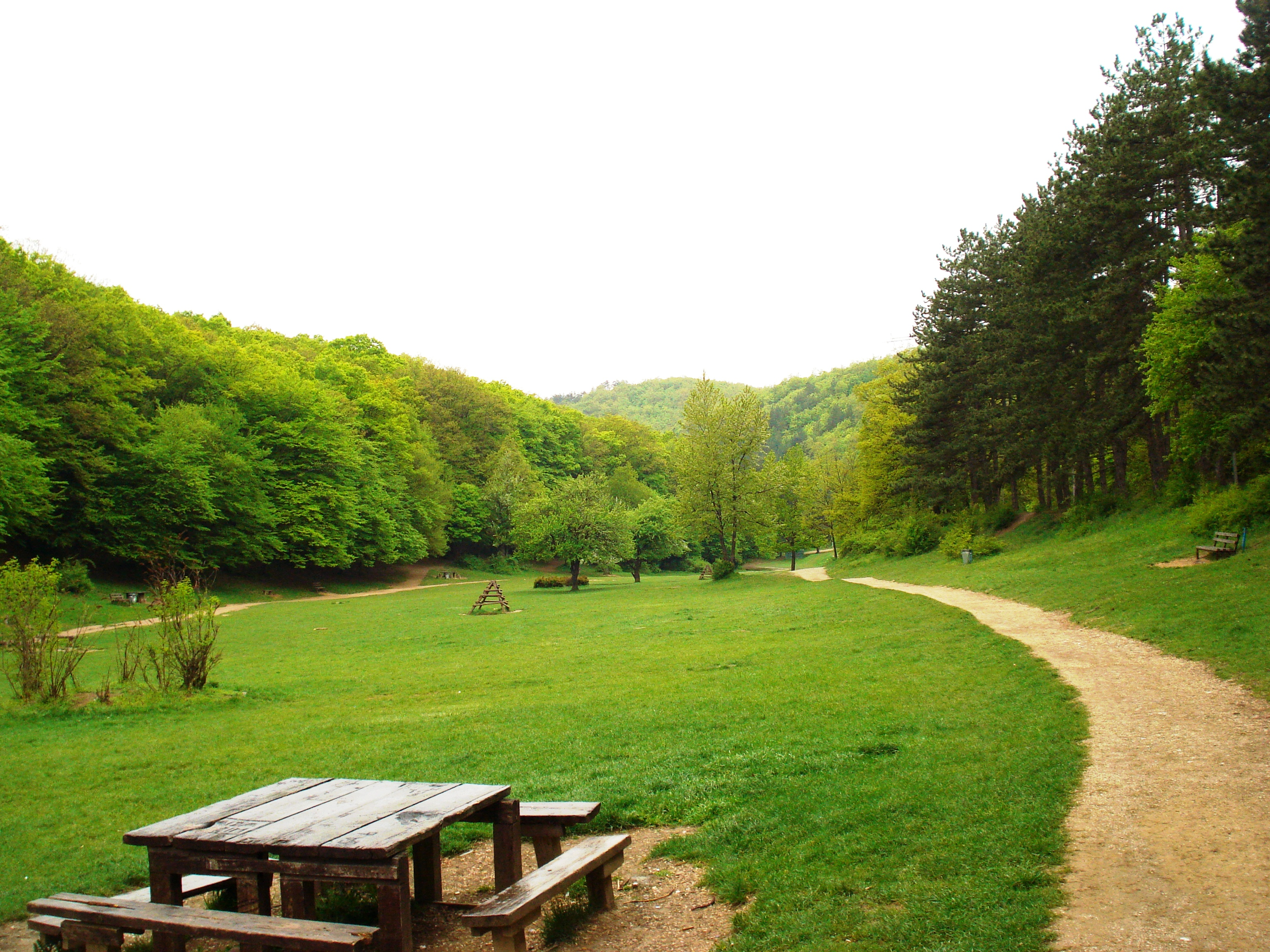
Gërmia Park

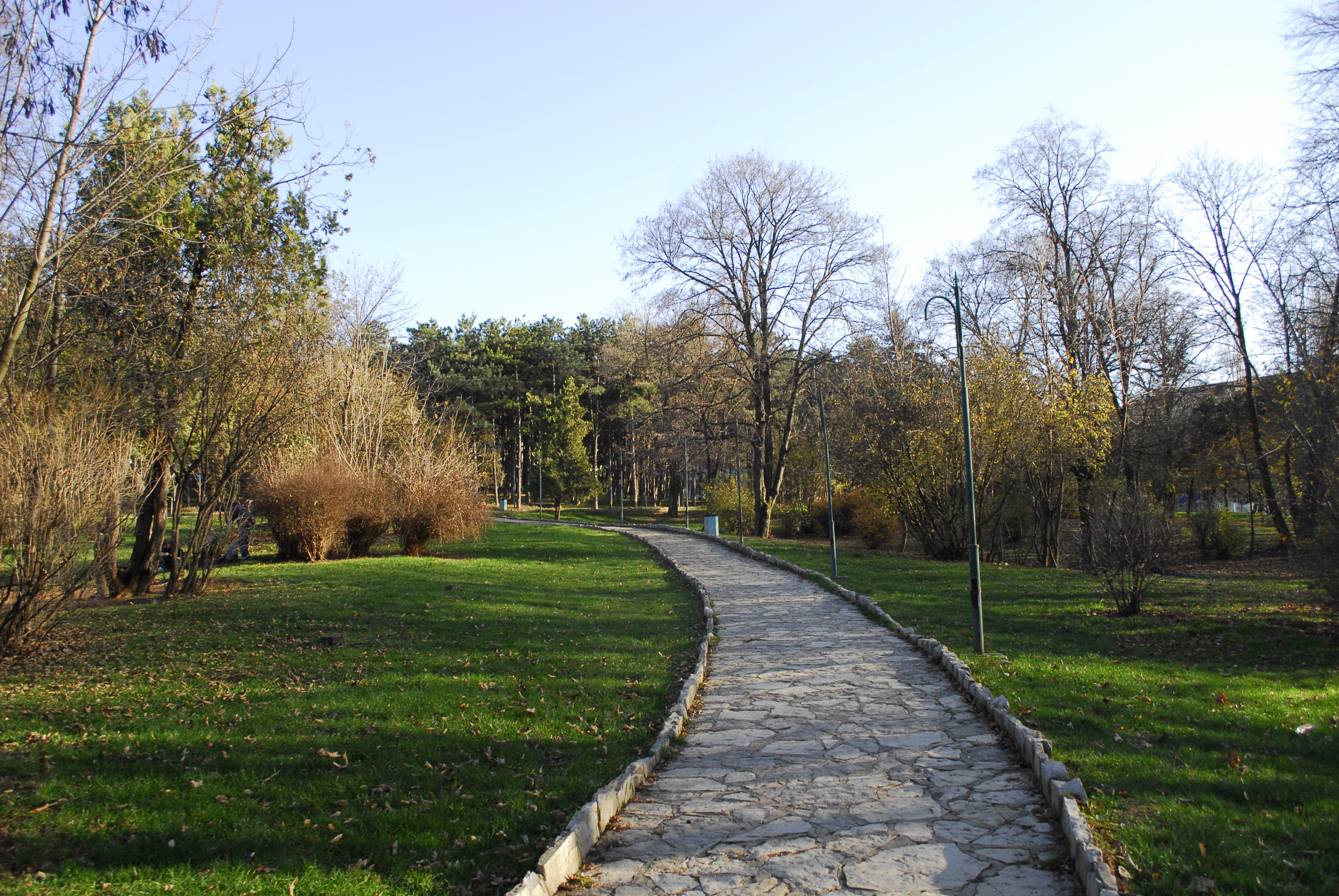
City Park

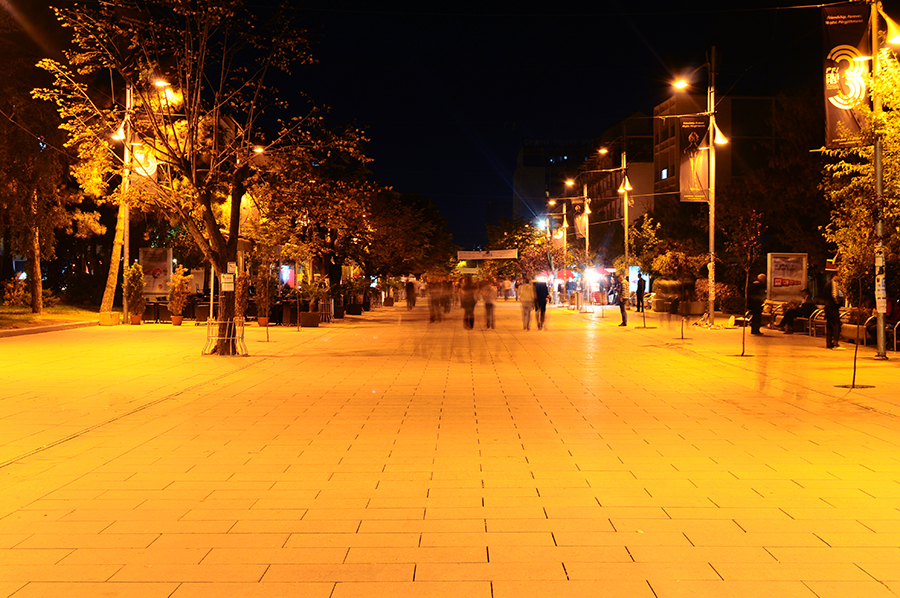
Mother Teresa Bulevard

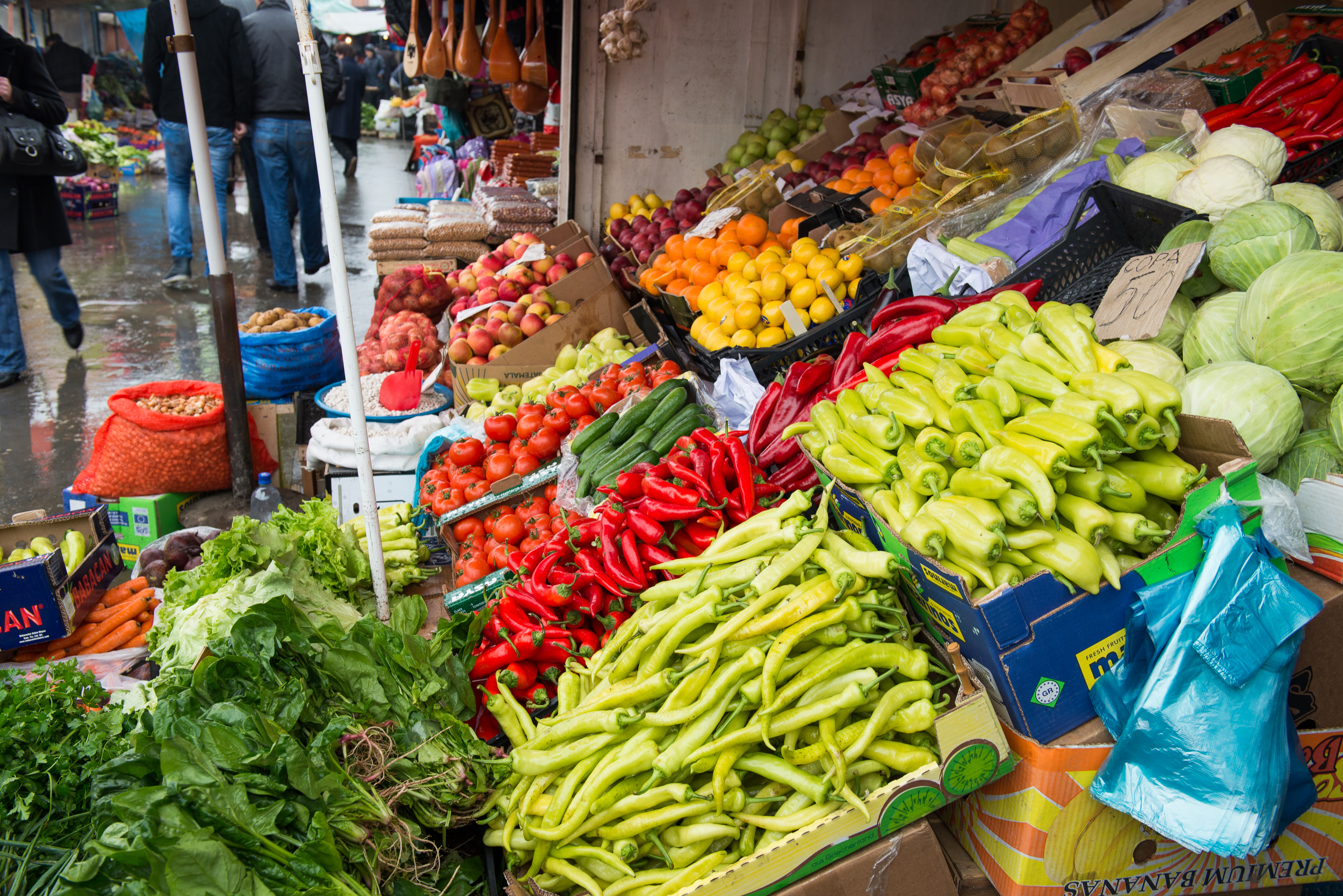
Prishtina Bazar

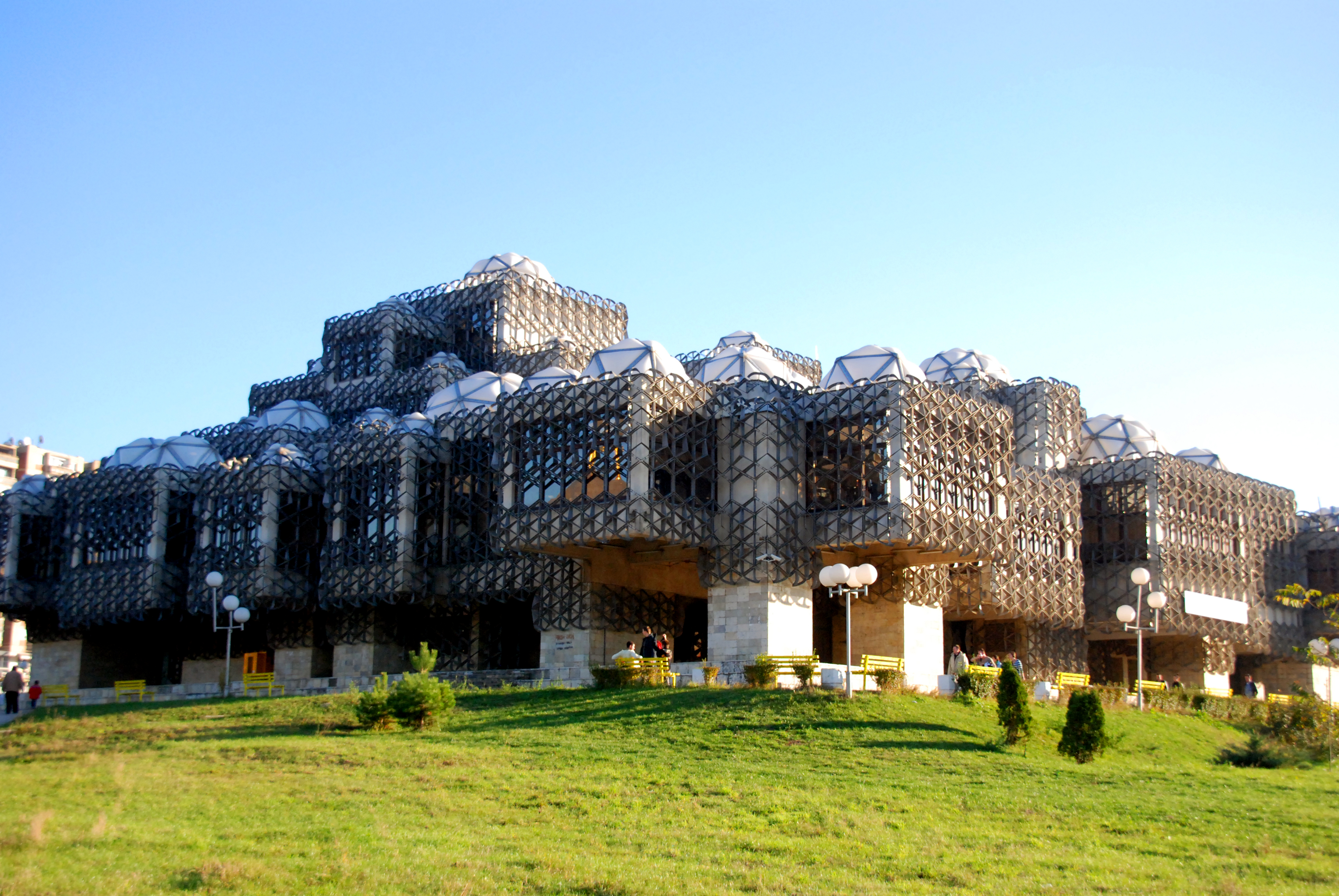
National Library of Kosovo

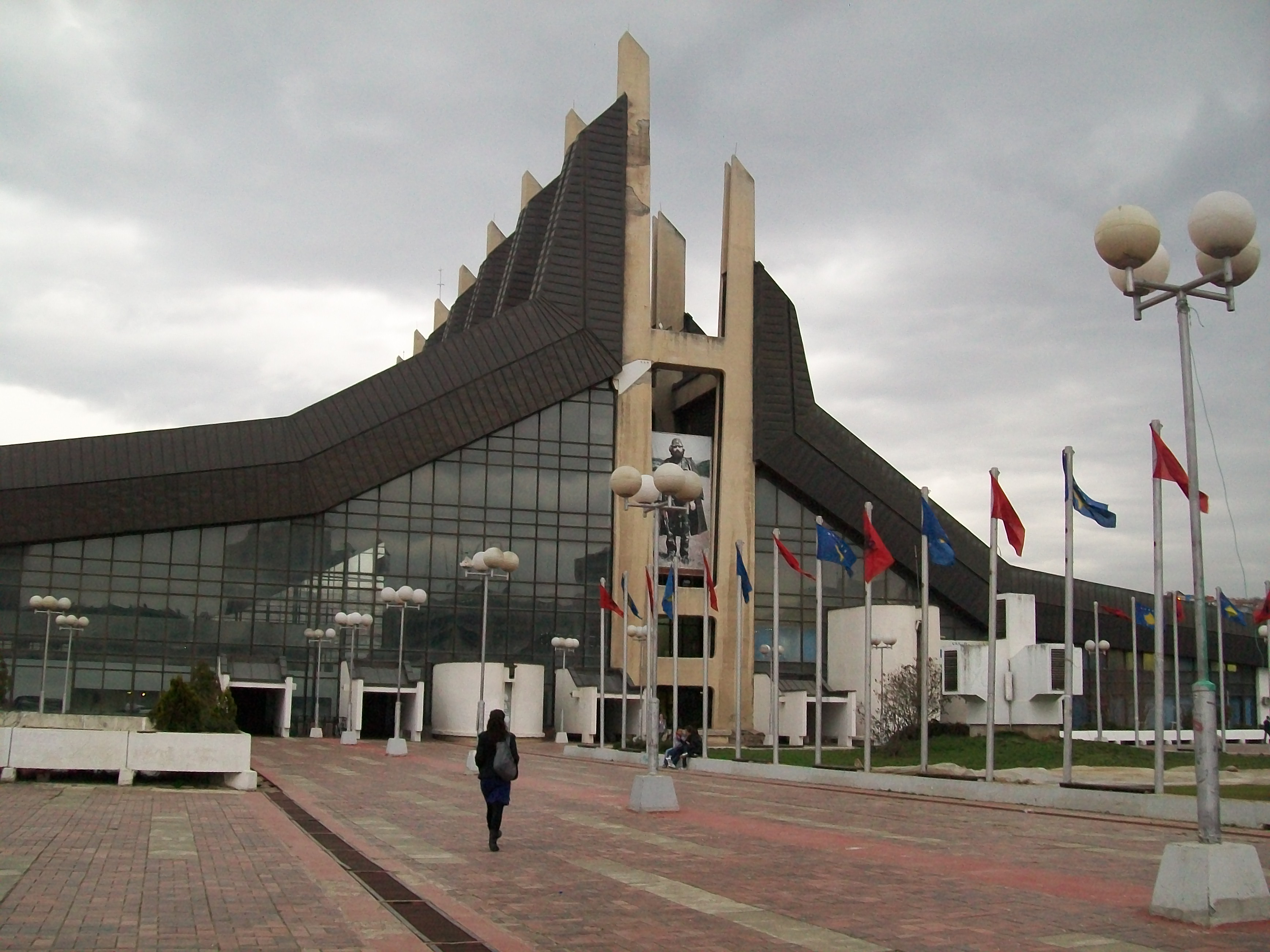
Boro Ramiz
