= Dorothea Broccardi =

Dorothea Broccardi was a fifteenth-century Clarissine nun, copyist, and limner.

== Biography ==
Broccardi was a nun of the Poor Clare order in San Lino, Volterra. Like many members of her community, she worked as a scribe, copyist, and limner. According to historian Marilyn Dunn, "Her miniatures emphasize iconography over artistic aesthetics, presenting saintly models for the nuns."

She collaborated closely with Marianus of Florence. As his amanuensis, she copied his works, chose their titles, and illustrated them in watercolor. Works copied and illuminated by Broccardi, identifiable by her Dorothea scripsit signature, include:

- Libro dell’Ordine di Santa Chiara
- Libro delle degnità (MS Volterra, Biblioteca Guarnacchi 6146)
- Vita di San Francesco (MS Volterra, Biblioteca Guarnacchi 5966)
- Via spirituale (MS Volterra, Biblioteca Guarnacchi 6359)
- Vita del beato Giovanni di Capestrano (MS Volterra, Biblioteca Guarnacchi 6147)
