= Marianus of Florence =

Italian historian (died 1523)

Marianus of Florence was a Friar Minor, historian, and chronicler of the Franciscan Order; born in Florence about the middle of the fifteenth century, exact date of birth uncertain; died there, 20 July 1523.

Very little is known of his life and personality. Marianus fell a victim to the plague while engaged in administering the last sacraments to the inhabitants of his native city.

None of Marianus's chronicles or other works have been published. His most noted work, Fasciculus Chronicarum, is a history of the Franciscan Order from the beginning up to the year 1486. Though it was written three centuries after the death of Francis, it is not necessarily untrustworthy, for he had access to original sources now lost, of which some fragments have been passed on through him.

Luke Wadding complains that Marianus's style is crude and inelegant; some have attributed this to the impatience of the nun Dorothea Broccardi (Dorothea scripsit appears on all her handiwork), who offered to be his amanuensis and who was continually pressing him for copy.

Besides the Fasciculus Chronicarum, he is the author of a Catalogus seu brevis historia feminarum ordinis Sanctæ Claræ which contains biographical sketches of more than 150 illustrious women of the Second Order of St. Francis. Among his other writings may be mentioned:

- Historia Montis Alverniæ
- Historia Provinciæ Etruriæ Ordinis Minorum
- Itinerarium Urbis Romæ

Marianus's Historia Translationis Habitus Sancti Francisci a Monte Acuto ad Florentiam has been translated into Italian and published by Roberto Razzoli in his monograph, La Chiesa d'Ognissanti in Firenze, Studi storicocritici (Florence, 1898).
