= San Lino, Volterra =

Church building in Volterra, Italy

San Lino
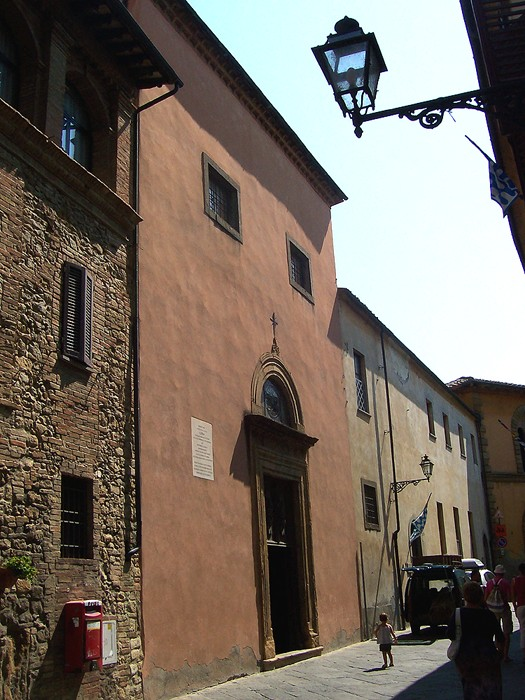

Religion
- Affiliation: Roman Catholic
- Province: Pisa

Location
- Location: Via San Lino 43/45 Volterra, Italy
- Interactive map of San Lino
- Coordinates: 43.40384°N 10.85678°E

Architecture
- Type: Church
- Style: Renaissance

San Lino is a Renaissance-style, Roman Catholic church and former monastery in Volterra, region of Tuscany, Italy. It is located on Via San Lino in the historic center of the town.

== History ==
The adjacent former Franciscan order nunnery, now a hotel, was founded in 1480, supposedly on the home of the first-century saint and Pope Linus, who putatively followed Peter as the second pope and of whom little else can be documented. Legend holds that he was born in Volterra.

Raffaelo Maffei, a native citizen who had been theologian for both Popes Julius II and Sixtus IV, endowed construction of the church and enlargement of the adjacent monastery (1517) at a cost of 80,000 scudi. The plain facade and portal were completed by 1513. The presbytery of the church contains a memorial bust (1522) of Maffei by Silvio da Fiesole (Silvio Cosini) with flanking statues of the Archangel Raphael and Beato Gerardo on his tomb by Fra Giovanni Angelo Montorsoli and Stagio Stagi. The interior ceiling is decorated with framed lunettes frescoed with images and scenes, including twelve Stories of the Life of Christ (circa 1618) by Cosimo Daddi. The church has a main altarpiece painted on wood with a Virgin and San Lino (1597) painted by Francesco Curradi. It is flanked by two paintings by Cosimo Daddi, depicting St John the Evangelist and Christ in the Garden. The first altar from the entrance on the right has a Birth of Mary (17th century) by Cesare Dandini. The church has a Visitation by St Elizabeth also by Daddi.

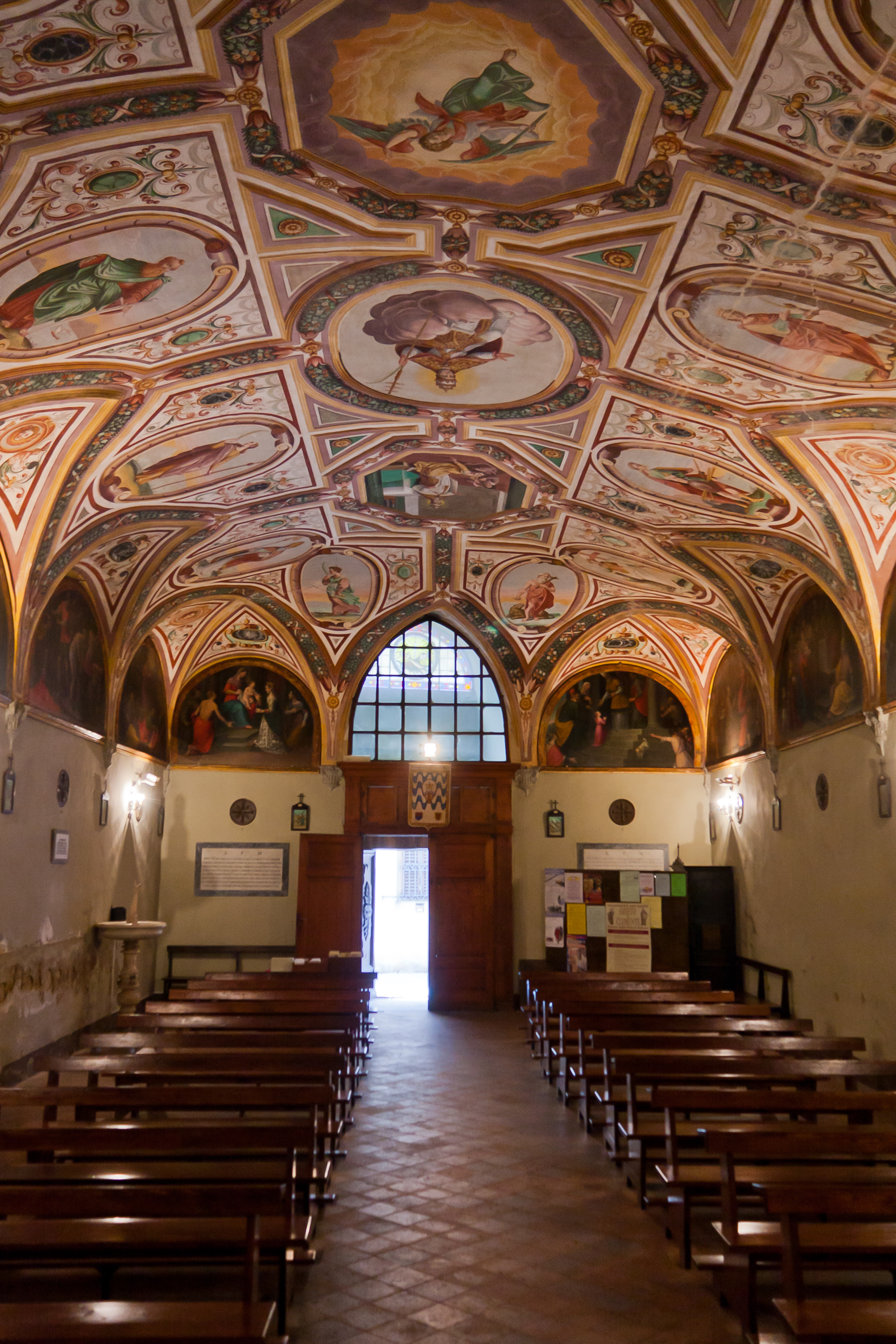
Inner view

== Sources ==
- Italian Wikipedia entry
