= Silvio Cosini =

Italian sculptor

Silvio Cosini (Poggibonsi, c. 1495- Milan, after 1547) was an Italian sculptor and stuccoist, mainly active in Florence. His works were in the style of Michelangelo, though he was trained by Andrea Ferrucci in Florence. Ferrucci obtained for him his first independent commission was in 1522, and included the decoration of the tomb of Raffaello Maffei in San Lino at Volterra. He usually worked in collaboration with other artists, including his brother Cosini (born circa 1505).

In 1524 Ferrucci was commissioned to execute a relief of the Madonna and child for the monument to Antonio Strozzi in Santa Maria Novella in Florence. Also in this period Cosini executed the monument to Ruggero Minerbetti for the same church. Michelangelo employed him between 1524 and 1528 to execute decorative grotteschi decoration and masks, including trophies, for the Medici Chapel, San Lorenzo.

The Francesco Boni citation states that he was active in Genoa and in the Duomo of Milan, and that he died in the latter town at the age of 47 years. It also states he was an excellent poet, musician, and fencer.

== Sources ==
- Entry of Grove encyclopedia of Art
- Boni, Filippo de' (1852). Biografia degli artisti ovvero dizionario della vita e delle opere dei pittori, degli scultori, degli intagliatori, dei tipografi e dei musici di ogni nazione che fiorirono da'tempi più remoti sino á nostri giorni. Seconda Edizione. Venice; Googlebooks: Presso Andrea Santini e Figlio. pp. 247–248.
