= Camille Paganel =

French politician and author (1795–1859)

Camille Pierre Alexis Paganel (26 August 1795, Paris - 17 December 1859, Paris) was a French lawyer, politician, and writer.

== Biography ==
Camille Paganel was born in Paris on 26 August 1795. The son of Pierre Paganel, a member of the French Convention, Camille Paganel began his career as a lawyer in 1816. He aligned himself with the July Monarchy and held various positions in the legal and political spheres. Paganel served as a substitute judge at the first instance court of the Seine in 1830 and later became a Master of Requests at the Conseil d'État in 1832. From 1834 to 1846, he represented Lot-et-Garonne as a deputy, belonging to the conservative majority in the parliament. In 1840, he assumed the role of Secretary-General of the Ministry of Agriculture and subsequently became the director of stud farms. Apart from his political career, Paganel was also a member of several learned societies and authored historical works. He died on 17 December 1859 in Paris.

== Publications ==
- Coup d’œil sur l'état politique de l'Europe en 1819
- De l'Espagne et de la liberté, 1820
- Théodora, ou la Famille chrétienne, 1825
- Histoire de Frédéric-Le-Grand, 1830
- Essai sur l'établissement monarchique de Napoléon, 1836
- Histoire de Scanderbeg, ou Turks et Chrétiens au XVe siècle, 1855
