= Jacques de Lavardin =

Jacques de Lavardin (fl. 1575–1585) was a lord in Plessis-Bourrot, squire and noble of the king of France, known for his translation of two works in French: the Celestine from Fernando de Rojas and the Historia de vita et rebus gestis Scanderbegi, a chronic of the Kingdom of Gjergj Kastriot Skanderbeg from Marin Barleti. De Lavardin was active during 1575 and 1585. He is the brother of the theologue and translator Jean de Lavardin, abbey of l'Estoile.

== Translation of Marin Barleti ==
His translation of the Historia de vita et rebus gestis Scanderbegi (in French 'Histoire de Georges Castriot, surnommé Scanderberg, roy d'Albanie) appeared in 1576. The sixth edition of 1621 is due to Nicolas Faret, who added a chronology in which were included the events from Mehmed II to Osman II.

== Translation of Fernando de Rojas ==
A first translation in French from the Celestine had already been published from Galliot du Pré (printed from Nicolas Cousteau) in 1527. The adaptation of Jacques de Levardin in 1577 was republished several times.
