= Raffaele Maffei =

Italian humanist, historian and theologian (1451–1522)

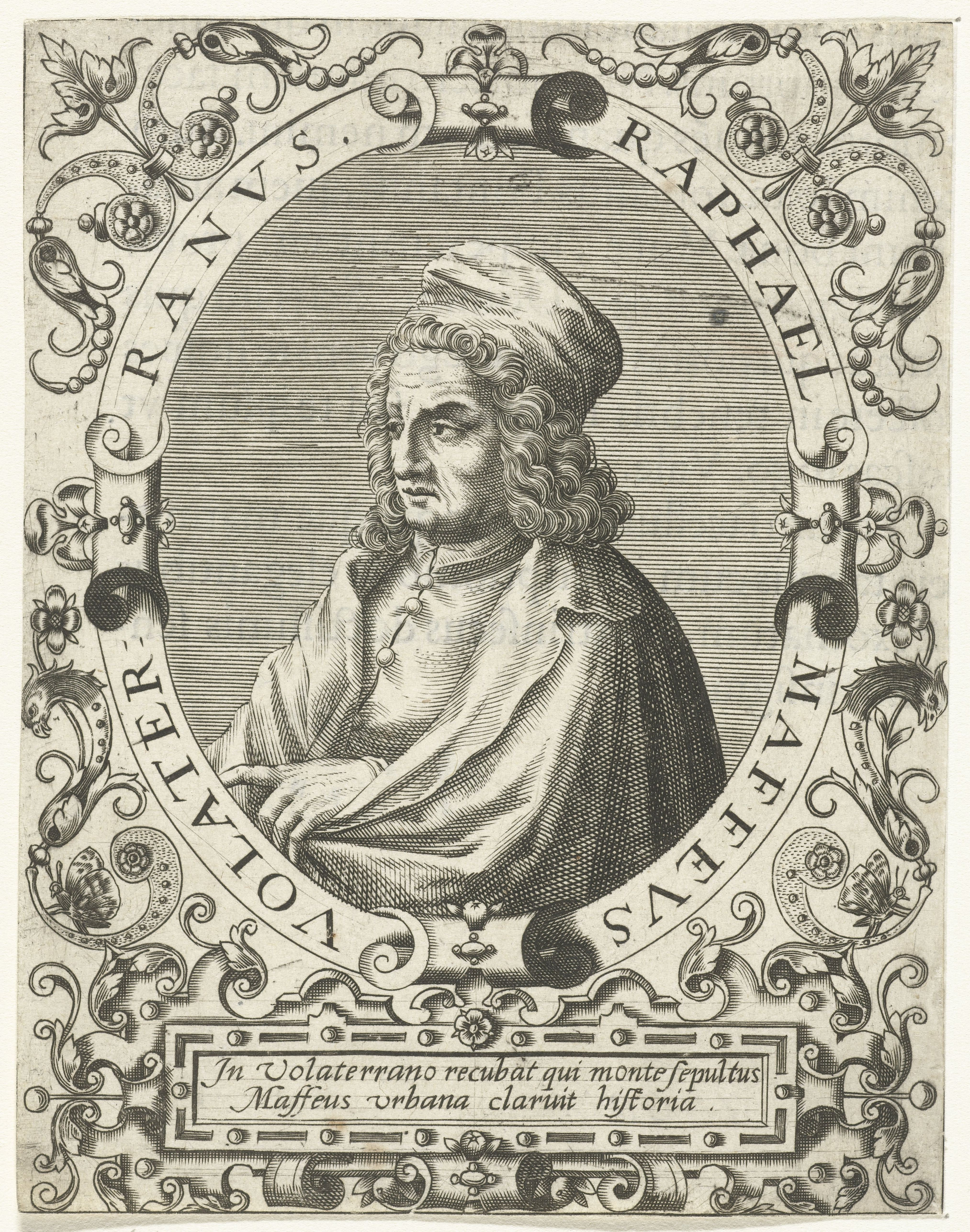
Raffaele Maffei

Raffaele (or Raffaello) Maffei OSM (17 February 1451 – 25 January 1522) was an Italian humanist, historian and theologian; and member of the Servite Order. He was a native of Volterra, Italy, and therefore is called Raphael Volaterranus or Raphael of Volterra; also Maffeus Volaterranus, or Raffaele Volterrano. Raffaele Maffei wrote the Commentaria Urbana, which was an encyclopedia divided into three parts.

During his lifetime, Raffaele Maffei was in contact with many humanist philosophers including Pico della Mirandola, Angelo Poliziano, and Michele Marullo. He had an amicable relationship with the Florentine Lorenzo de' Medici, despite Antonio Maffei's involvement in the Pazzi conspiracy. Raffaele and his brother Mario were close to the first Medici pope, Pope Leo X. When Raffaele left the Papal Curia, he remained aware of Roman events due to his correspondence with family members working in Rome. He was known in the Italian Peninsula and widely in Europe for his humanist writings.

== Biography ==
From earliest youth he devoted himself to the study of letters, and in 1466 was called to Rome, with his brothers, by their father Gherardo Maffei, whom Pius II had appointed professor of law at the University of Rome, and had taken later for his secretary, a position he held also under Paul II and Sixtus IV. At Rome Raffaele held himself aloof from the court, devoting his time to the practice of piety and to the study of philosophy of theology and of the Greek language, the latter under George of Trebizond.

In 1479-8, he went to Hungary with Cardinal Giovanni of Aragon, on the latter's mission to King Matthias Corvinus. The trip lasted about a year and provided him with information that he later used in his encyclopedia. Upon his return, Raffaele was persuaded by Gaspare da Firenze not to become a Minor Observant, as Raffaele intended to do; whereupon he married, and established his residence at Volterra.

The remainder of his life was spent in study, in the practice of piety and of penance, and in the exercise of works of charity; in his own house, he established an accademia, in which he gave lectures on philosophy and on theology, while he founded the Clarisse monastery of Volterra. He died in the odor of sanctity; and, contrary to his desire, his brother erected to his memory a splendid monument in the church of San Lino, which Raffaele had endowed.

Raffaele's monument was contracted to Silvio Cosini. In letters from Raffaele's son-in-law, there are several complaints that Cosini left Volterra to work on another commission prior to completing the tomb. Camillo Incontri promoted Stagio Stagi as the artist to take over the project, but Cosini returned to Volterra to finish the commission. Art historian, Rolf Bagemihl argues that Giovanni Angelo Montorsoli worked on Raffaele's tomb as well, based on a distinct shift in style and documents from the time period. Cosini is also tied to a bust of Raffaele that is dated to the same years as the tomb project.

== Works ==
Among the works of Maffei are Commentariorum rerum urbanarum libri XXXVIII (Rome, 1506; Paris, 1516), an encyclopedia of all subjects known at that time. It consists of three parts; in the first, "Geography", he writes a history of the whole known world arranged by location; the second part, "Anthropology", is devoted, more especially, to the contemporaneous history of that time; the third part is devoted to "Philology" which encapsulates all of science and natural history as it was known.

After the Latin treatise Anthropologium de hominis dignitate, published in 1501 by Magnus Hundt, Maffei authored the first work of the Modern era adopting the word Anthropologia in the title.

Eight times up to 1603. The 1603 edition contains 814 folio pages. The first book consists of the table of contents and a classed index; books 2-12, geography; 13-23, lives of illustrious men, the popes occupying book 22, and the emperors book 23; 24-27, animals and plants; 28, metals, gems, stones, houses and other inanimate things; 34, de scientiis cyclicis (grammar and rhetoric); 35, de scientiis mathematicis, arithmetic, geometry, optica, catoptrica, astronomy and astrology; 36-38, Aristotelica (on the works of Aristotle).

Maffei's biographies of Sixtus IV, Innocent VIII, Alexander VI, and Pius III, which appear as an appendix to Platina's Vitae Pontificum, and which were also published separately (Venice, 1518), are taken from the Commentarii; in them Maffei blames unsparingly the disordered life of the Roman court.

At Volterra, he wrote a compendium of philosophy and of theology, De institutione christiana and De prima philosophia (Rome, 1518) in which he rather follows Scotus. He translated, from the Greek into Latin, the "Odyssey" of Homer, the "Oeconomics" of Xenophon, the "Gothic War" of Procopius, "Sermones et tractatus S. Basilii", some sermons of St. John of Damascus and of St. Andrew of Crete; he also wrote the "Vita B. Jacobi de Certaldo". While the Spanish humanist Juan Luis Lives mentioned Maffei as an examplar paedogist, Erasmus of Rotterdam criticized his translations of St Basil's works.

He was in epistolary communication with popes, cardinals, and other learned men. The manuscript of the work which he called "Peristromata" remained incomplete; it went to the Biblioteca Barberiniana.

Maffei wrote the Breuis sub Iulio Leoneque Historia also known as Breuis Historia. It was a set of writings that focused on curial reforms, religious order reforms, papal conduct, and reevaluating translations of religious texts. The Breuis Historia exemplified the positive qualities of the papacy and offered suggestions on reforms within the Church. It was completed near the beginning of the Reformation.

In response to Martin Luther's writings, Raffaele Maffei wrote the Nasi Romani in Martinum Lutherum Apologeticus or Apologeticus. He argued against Luther. Maffei used Greek and Roman philosophy connected to theological examples within the Catholic Church to prove his points. He lacked complete access to Luther's writings, so his responses do not accurately reflect Luther's ideologies. Maffei died before Apologeticus was completed and published.

== Family ==
Raffaele Maffei was the third born son of his parents Gherardo di Giovanni Maffei and Lucia di Giovanni Seghieri. Gherardo secured a position in the Papal Curia for three of his sons. The eldest brother, Giovanni Battissta (1444-1464), died young from the plague.

Raffaele's second eldest brother Antonio (1450-1478) joined his father and two younger brothers in the Papal Curia. In 1471, he married Caterina di Antonio Cortesi and had three children: Domitilla, Giovan Battista, and Camillo. Antonio was involved in the Pazzi Conspiracy; as a result, he was tortured, castrated, and hanged in 1478. Raffaele was in Florence at the time, but was not involved in the Pazzi Conspiracy and remained unharmed.

His younger brother Mario (1463-1537) remained in the Papal Curia for most of his life. Prior to Raffaele's 1479 travels, he arranged for their uncle Giovanni Seghieri to look after Mario. In 1516, Mario was promoted to Bishop, first, of Aquino and then of Cavaillon. Following Raffaele's death, Mario petitioned for his brother's canonization, but without success. Mario died on 23 June 1537.

Sometime prior to 1490, Raffaele married Volterran noblewoman Tita di Bartolomeo Minucci. The couple had two children, Gerardo and Lucilla. Only Lucilla survived to adulthood. Raffaele ensured that his daughter received an education; she married Paolo Riccobaldi of Volterra in November 1508. Around 1525, Raffaele's son-in-law was adopted into the family to continue the Maffei family name.

Raffaele only had one surviving grandson, Giulio Maffei.
