= Volterra =

- Comune
- Città di Volterra
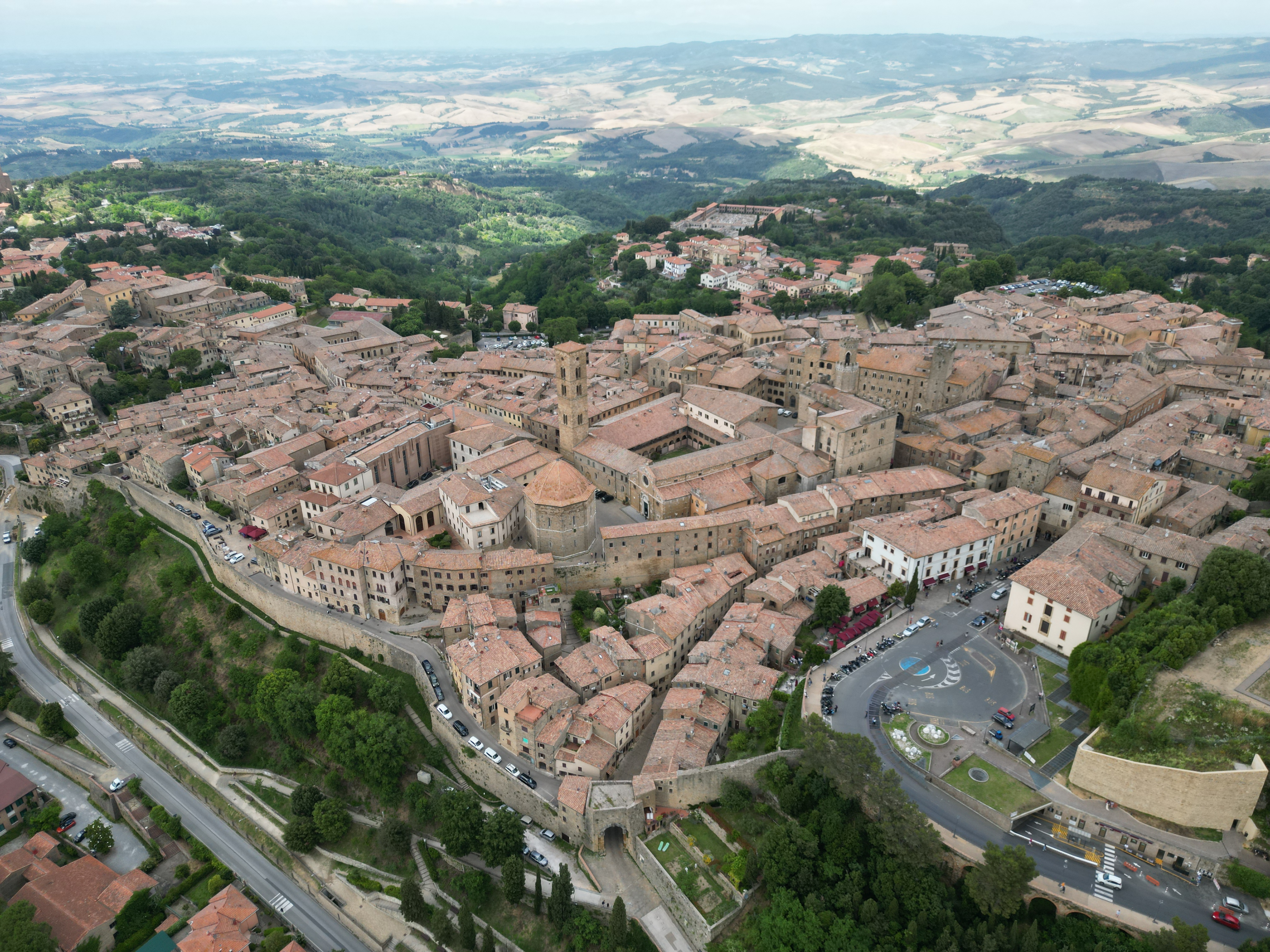

- Coat of arms

- Location within Italy Location within Tuscany
- Coordinates: 43°24′N 10°52′E
- Country: Italy
- Region: Tuscany
- Province: Pisa (PI)
- Frazioni: Mazzolla, Montemiccioli, Saline di Volterra, Villamagna

Government
  - Mayor: Giacomo Santi (PD)

Area
  - Total: 252 km^{2} (97 sq mi)
- Elevation: 531 m (1,742 ft)

Population (2025)
  - Total: 9,366
  - Density: 37.2/km^{2} (96.3/sq mi)
- Demonym: Volterrani
- Time zone: UTC+1 (CET)
  - Summer (DST): UTC+2 (CEST)
- Postal code: 56048
- Dialing code: 0588
- Patron saint: St. Justus and Clement
- Saint day: 5 June
- Website: Official website

Volterra (Italian pronunciation: [volˈtɛrra]; Latin: Volaterrae) is a walled mountaintop town in the Tuscany region of Italy. Its history dates from before the 8th century BC and it has substantial structures from the Etruscan, Roman, and Medieval periods.

== History ==
Volterra, known to the ancient Etruscans as Velathri or Vlathri and to the Romans as Volaterrae, is a town and comune in the Tuscany region of Italy. The site is believed to have been continuously inhabited as a city since at least the end of the 8th century BC.

The town was a Bronze Age settlement of the Proto-Villanovan culture. It became an important Etruscan centre as one of the "twelve cities" of the Etruscan League.

It was allied to Rome at the end of the 3rd century BC and became a municipium. The wealthy Caecina family lived here and Gaius Caecina Largus and the eminent Aulus Caecina Severus (consul 2–1 BC) built the theatre and probably other monuments. Other important families here were the Persii and the Laelii. Aulus Caecina was appointed propraetor of Moesia by 4 AD and later in charge of several legions on the lower Rhine after 14 AD where he led them ably, routing the army of Arminius who had destroyed three Roman legions. He was eulogised by the chroniclers for his exploits and on his return to Rome he was awarded triumph honours.

The city was a bishop's residence in the 5th century, and its episcopal power was affirmed during the 12th century. With the decline of the episcopate and the discovery of local alum deposits, Volterra became a place of interest of the Republic of Florence, whose forces conquered Volterra. Florentine rule was not always popular, and opposition occasionally broke into rebellion. On 18 June 1472, during the so-called Allumiere War between Volterra and Florence in which Federico da Montefeltro allowed his soldiers to pillage Volterra and to commit rape and murder of its citizens, despite the town's surrender on 16 June after a 25-day siege. The incident caused the emigration of many wealthy families and the appropriation of their goods.

When the Republic of Florence fell in 1530, Volterra came under the control of the Medici family and later followed the history of the Grand Duchy of Tuscany.

== Climate ==
Climate data for Volterra (1965–1990)
Month	Jan	Feb	Mar	Apr	May	Jun	Jul	Aug	Sep	Oct	Nov	Dec	Year
Mean daily maximum °C (°F)	7.3 (45.1)	7.8 (46.0)	10.3 (50.5)	13.3 (55.9)	17.9 (64.2)	21.8 (71.2)	25.5 (77.9)	25.2 (77.4)	21.5 (70.7)	17.0 (62.6)	11.3 (52.3)	7.9 (46.2)	15.6 (60.1)
Mean daily minimum °C (°F)	3.2 (37.8)	3.1 (37.6)	4.7 (40.5)	7.1 (44.8)	11.3 (52.3)	14.8 (58.6)	18.0 (64.4)	18.0 (64.4)	15.1 (59.2)	11.6 (52.9)	6.9 (44.4)	4.1 (39.4)	9.8 (49.6)
Average precipitation mm (inches)	64.7 (2.55)	68.6 (2.70)	72.0 (2.83)	70.5 (2.78)	61.9 (2.44)	56.6 (2.23)	46.2 (1.82)	59.8 (2.35)	79.3 (3.12)	88.2 (3.47)	95.8 (3.77)	68.7 (2.70)	832.3 (32.77)
Average precipitation days (≥ 1.0 mm)	8.2	8.0	8.3	9.2	7.3	6.1	3.7	5.8	7.0	7.2	8.5	8.2	87.5
Average relative humidity (%)	78	77	74	75	75	73	69	72	75	80	81	80	76
Source: NOAA

== Culture ==
The main events that take place during the year in Volterra are:

- Volterra gusto
- Volterra arte
- Volterra teatro

== Transport ==
Volterra has a station on the Cecina-Volterra Railway, called "Volterra Saline – Pomarance" due to its position, in the frazione of Saline di Volterra.

== Municipal government ==
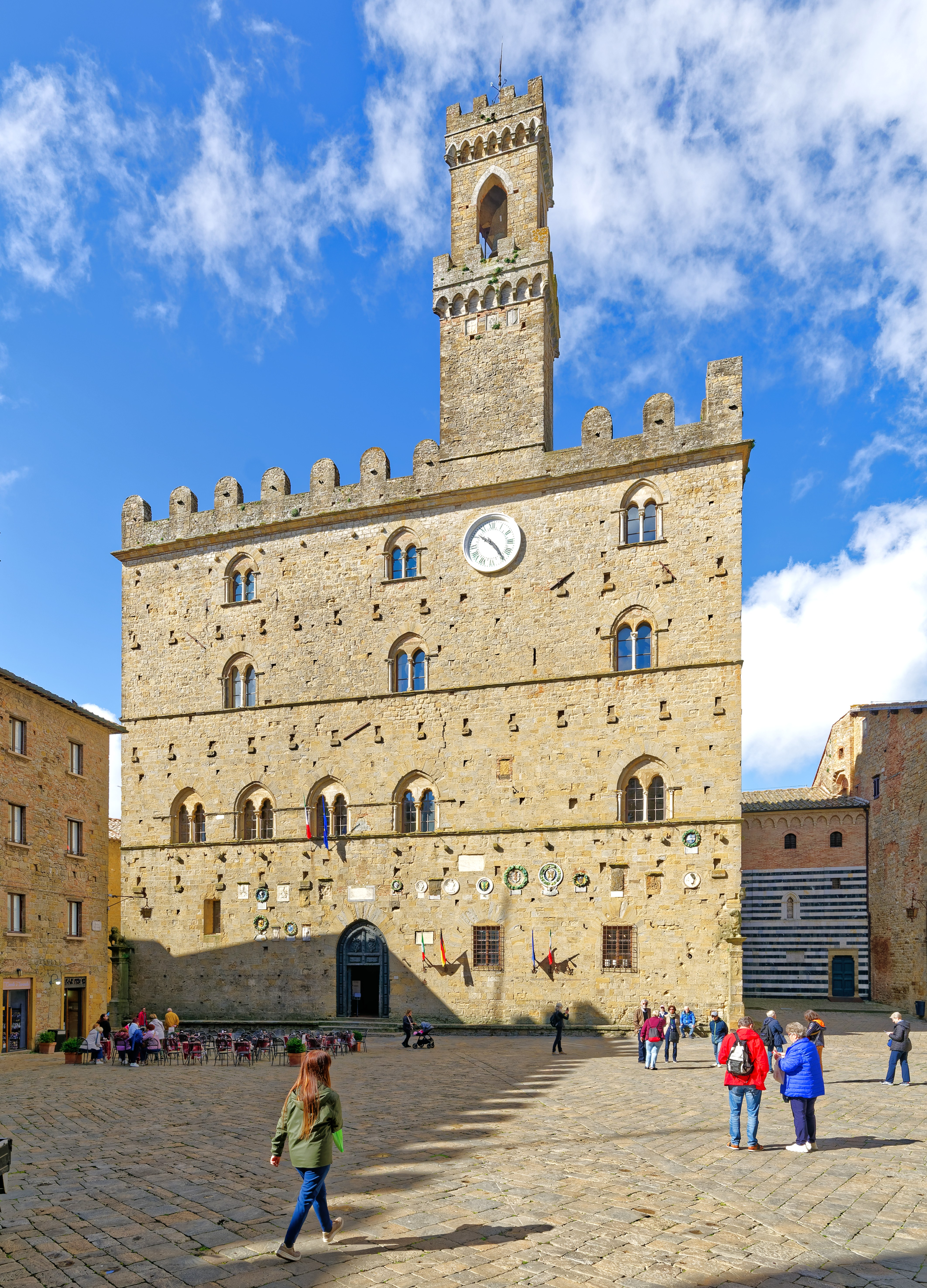
Palazzo dei Priori is Volterra's Town Hall.

Volterra is headed by a mayor (sindaco) assisted by a legislative body, the consiglio comunale, and an executive body, the giunta comunale. Since 1995 the mayor and members of the consiglio comunale are directly elected together by resident citizens, while from 1945 to 1995 the mayor was chosen by the legislative body. The giunta comunale is chaired by the mayor, who appoints others members, called assessori. The offices of the comune are housed in a building usually called the municipio or palazzo comunale.

Since 1995 the mayor of Volterra is directly elected by citizens, originally every four, then every five years. The current mayor is Giacomo Santi (PD), elected on 26 May 2019 with 44.4% of votes and re-elected on 9 June 2024 with 50.2% of votes.

Mayor	Term start	Term end	Party
Mario Giustarini	11 May 1945	27 July 1980	PCI
Giovanni Brunale	27 July 1980	24 April 1995	PCI
Ivo Gabellieri	24 April 1995	14 June 2004	PDS
Cesare Bartaloni	14 June 2004	8 June 2009	PD
Marco Buselli	8 June 2009	27 May 2019	Ind
Giacomo Santi	27 May 2019	Incumbent	PD

== Main sights ==
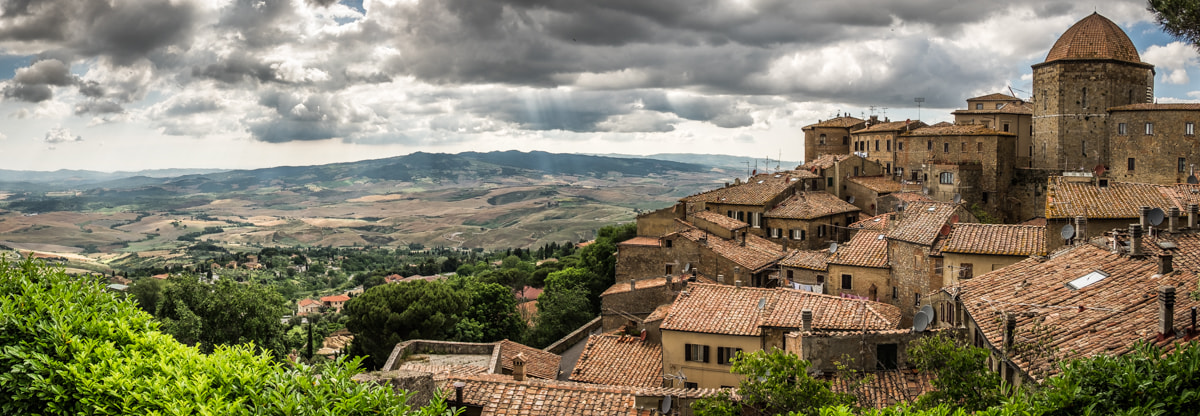
View from Volterra.

- Roman Theatre of Volterra, 1st century BC, excavated in the 1950s
- Roman Amphitheater, discovered in 2015 and has been excavated over the succeeding years
- Piazza dei Priori, the main square, a fine example of medieval Tuscan town squares
- Palazzo dei Priori, the town hall on main piazza, begun in 1208 and finished in 1257
- Pinacoteca e museo civico di Volterra: Art Museum housed in Palazzo Minucci-Solaini. Founded in 1905, the gallery consists mostly of works by Tuscan artists from 14th to 17th centuries. Includes a Deposition by Rosso Fiorentino.
- Etruscan Acropolis and Roman Cistern. The acropolis on the citadel dates to the 8th century B.C., while the cistern is from the 1st century B.C.
- Volterra Cathedral. It was enlarged in the 13th century after an earthquake. It houses a ciborium and some angels by Mino da Fiesole, a notable wood Deposition (1228), a masterwork of Romanesque sculpture and the Sacrament Chapel, with paintings by Santi di Tito, Giovanni Balducci and Agostino Veracini. In the center of the vault are fragments of an Eternal Father by Niccolò Circignani. Also noteworthy is the Addolorata Chapel, with a terracotta group attributed to Andrea della Robbia and a fresco of Riding Magi by Benozzo Gozzoli. In the nearby chapel, dedicated to the Most Holy Name of Jesus, is a table with Christ's monogram, allegedly painted by Bernardino of Siena. The rectangular bell tower is from 1493.
- Volterra Baptistery or Baptistery of San Giovanni, built in the second half of the 13th century.
- Fortezza Medicea (Medicean Fortress), built in the 1470s, now a prison housing the noted restaurant, Fortezza Medicea restaurant.
- Guarnacci Etruscan Museum, with thousands of funeral urns dating back to the Hellenistic and Archaic periods. Main attractions are the bronze statuette "Ombra della sera" (lit. '"Shadow of the Evening"'), and the sculpted effigy, "Urna degli Sposi" (lit. '"Urn of the Spouses"') of an Etruscan couple in terra cotta.
- The Etruscan Walls of Volterra, including the well-preserved Porta all'Arco (3rd-2nd centuries BC), and Porta Diana gates.
- The Medici Villa di Spedaletto, outside the city, in direction of Lajatico
- There are excavations of Etruscan tombs in the Valle Bona area.
- Sant'Alessandro, Romanesque Roman Catholic church.
- Volterra Psychiatric Hospital, founded in 1888. Closed in 1978, it was reopened for public and will be once more used for psychiatric purposes.
- Palazzo Inghirami
- Persio Flacco Theater

== Notable people ==
- Persius (34–62), the Roman satirist of Etruscan stock
- Pope Linus, who, according to the Liber Pontificalis, was born in Volterra, and was the successor to Peter
- Lucius Petronius Taurus Volusianus, consul with the Emperor Gallienus in AD 261 and urban prefect in AD 267–268
- Meshullam da Volterra (d. 1508), an Italian-Jewish businessman who traveled to the Land of Israel and surrounding Jewish communities. His works provide concise and important details about the nature and conditions of Ottoman Jewry.
- Daniele da Volterra (1509–1566), Mannerist painter
- The poet Jacopo da Leona, a judge at Volterra in the 13th century
- The Maffei family of Volterra produced the apostolic Secretary Gherardo Maffei and his three sons: the eldest Antonio Maffei, who was one of the assassins in the Pazzi Conspiracy against the Medici in 1478; second the humanist Raffaello Maffei called "Volterrano" who also served in the Curia; and youngest Mario Maffei, who was also a scholar and followed his father in the curia.
- Giuseppe Bessi (1857–1922), sculptor
- Emilio Fiaschi (1858–1941), sculptor

== In popular culture ==
- Volterra features in Horatius, a poem by Lord Macaulay.
- Linda Proud's A Tabernacle for the Sun (2005), the first volume of The Botticelli Trilogy, begins with the sack of Volterra in 1472. Volterra is the ancestral home of the Maffei family and the events of 1472 lead directly to the Pazzi Conspiracy of 1478. The protagonist of the novel is Tommaso de' Maffei, half brother of one of the conspirators.
- Volterra is an important location in Stephenie Meyer's Twilight series. In the books, Volterra is home to the Volturi, a clan of rich, regal, powerful ancient vampires, who essentially act as the rulers of the world's vampire population. (However, the relevant scenes from the movie were shot in Montepulciano.)
- Volterra is the site of Stendhal's famously disastrous encounter in 1819 with his beloved Countess Mathilde Dembowska: she recognised him there, despite his disguise of new clothes and green glasses, and was furious. This is the central incident in his book On Love.
- Volterra is mentioned repeatedly in British author Dudley Pope's Captain Nicholas Ramage historical nautical series. Gianna, the Marchesa of Volterra and the fictional ruler of the area, features in the first twelve books of the eighteen-book series. The books chart the progress and career of Ramage during the Napoleonic wars of the late eighteenth and early nineteenth century, providing readers with well-scripted articulate details of life aboard sailing vessels and conditions at sea of that time.
- Volterra is the site where the novel Chimaira by the Italian author Valerio Massimo Manfredi takes place.
- Valerio Massimo Manfredi's The Ancient Curse is also set in Volterra, where a statue called 'The Shade of Twilight' is stolen from the Volterra museum.
- Volterra is featured in Jhumpa Lahiri's 2008 collection of short stories Unaccustomed Earth. It is where Hema and Kaushik, the protagonists of the final short story "Going Ashore," travel before they part.
- Volterra is featured in Luchino Visconti's 1965 film Vaghe stelle dell'Orsa, released as Sandra (Of a Thousand Delights) in the United States and as Of These Thousand Pleasures in the UK.
- Volterra's scenery is used for Central City in the 2017 film Fullmetal Alchemist (film) directed by Fumihiko Sori.
- The 2016 video game The Town of Light is set in a fictionalized version of the notorious Volterra Psychiatric Hospital.
- "Volaterrae" is the name given by Dan and Una to their secret place in Far Wood in Rudyard Kipling's Puck of Pook's Hill. They named it from the verse in Lord Macaulay's Lays of Ancient Rome:

From lordly Volaterrae,
Where scowls the far-famed hold
Piled by the hands of giants
For Godlike Kings of old.

- Volterra and its relationship with Medici Florence features in the 2018 second season of Medici: Masters of Florence.

== Twin cities ==
Volterra is twinned with:

- Mende, France
- Wunsiedel, Germany
- Sandomierz, Poland

== Gallery ==
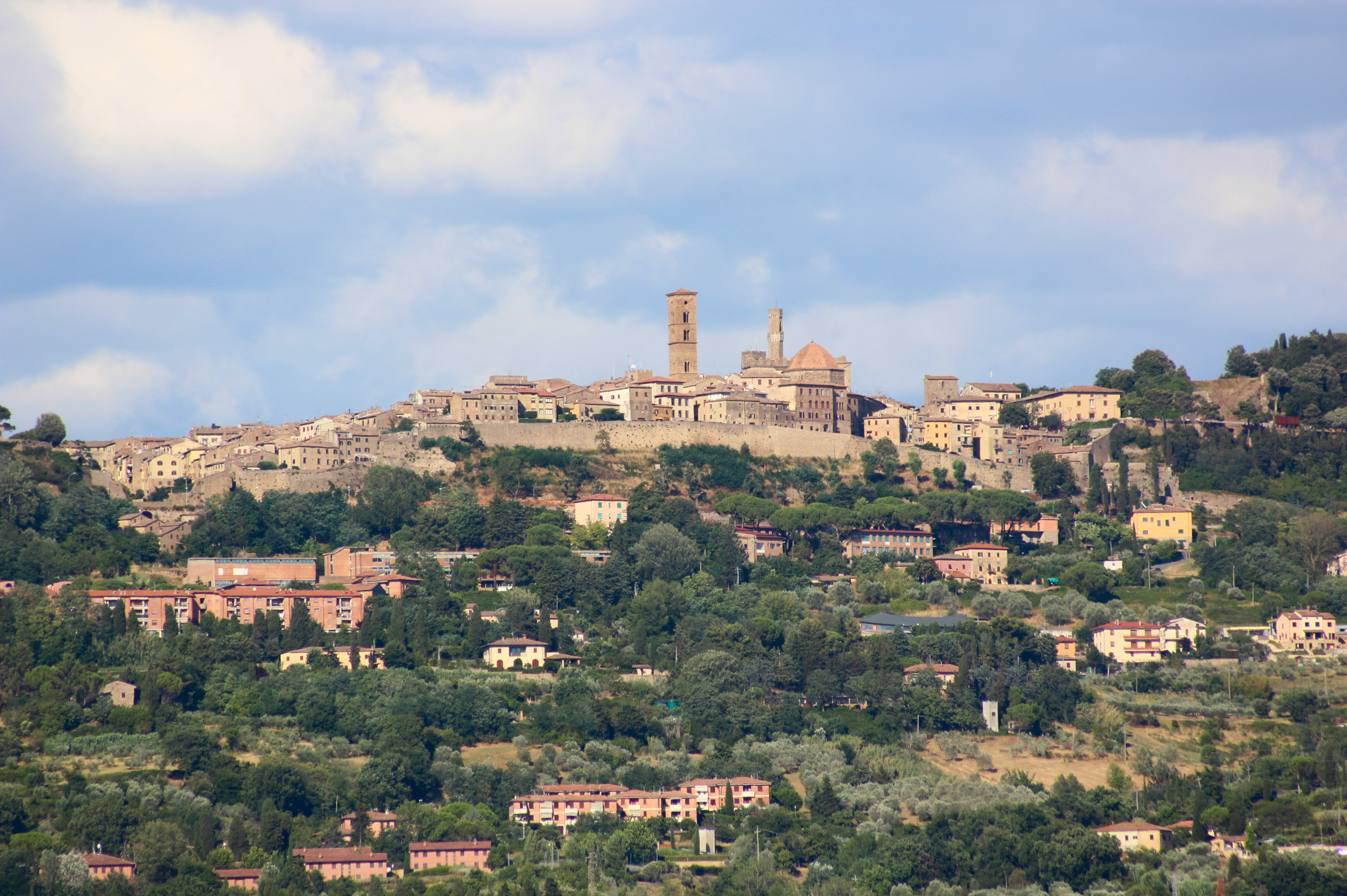
View of Volterra

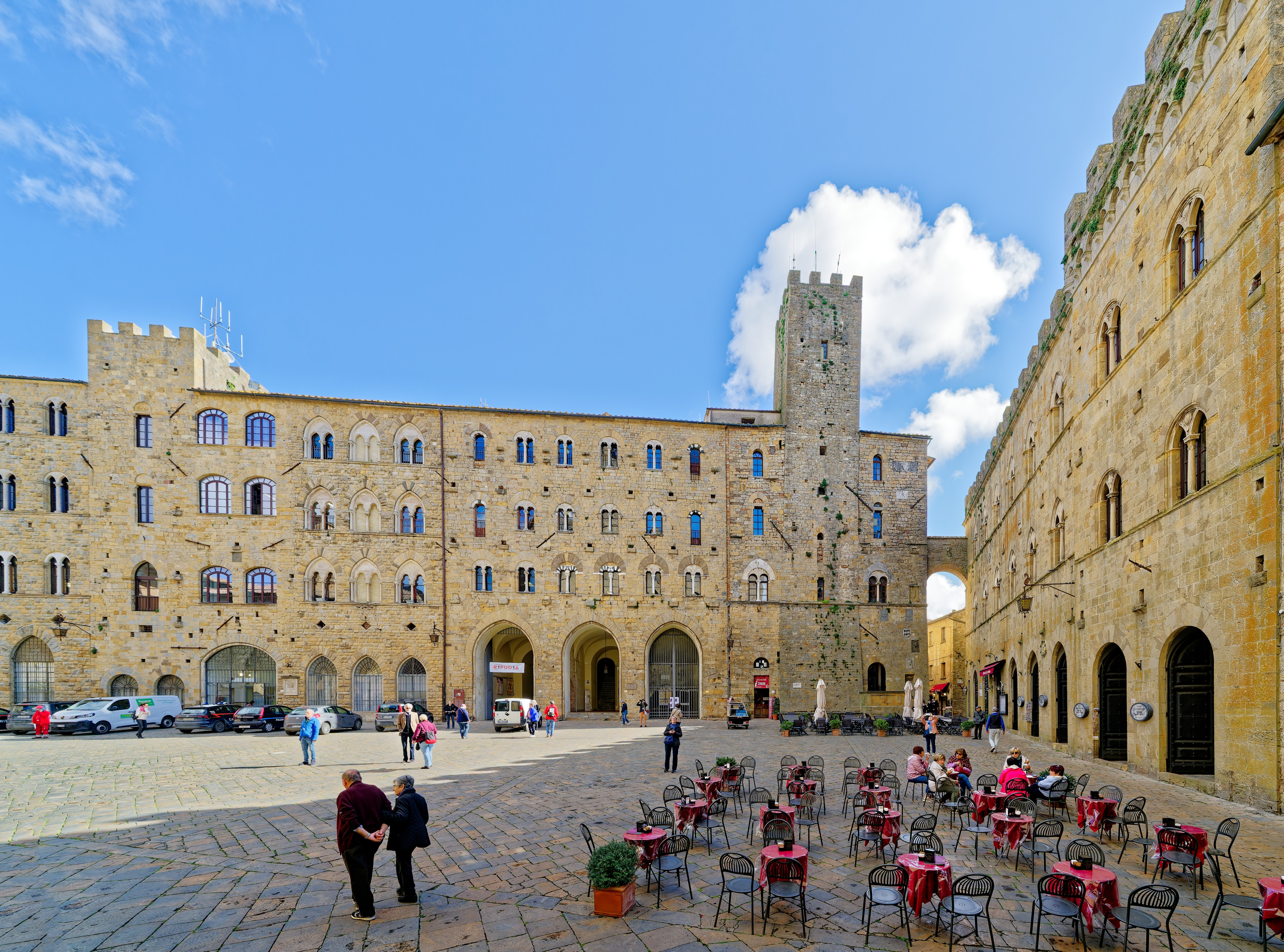
Piazza dei Priori

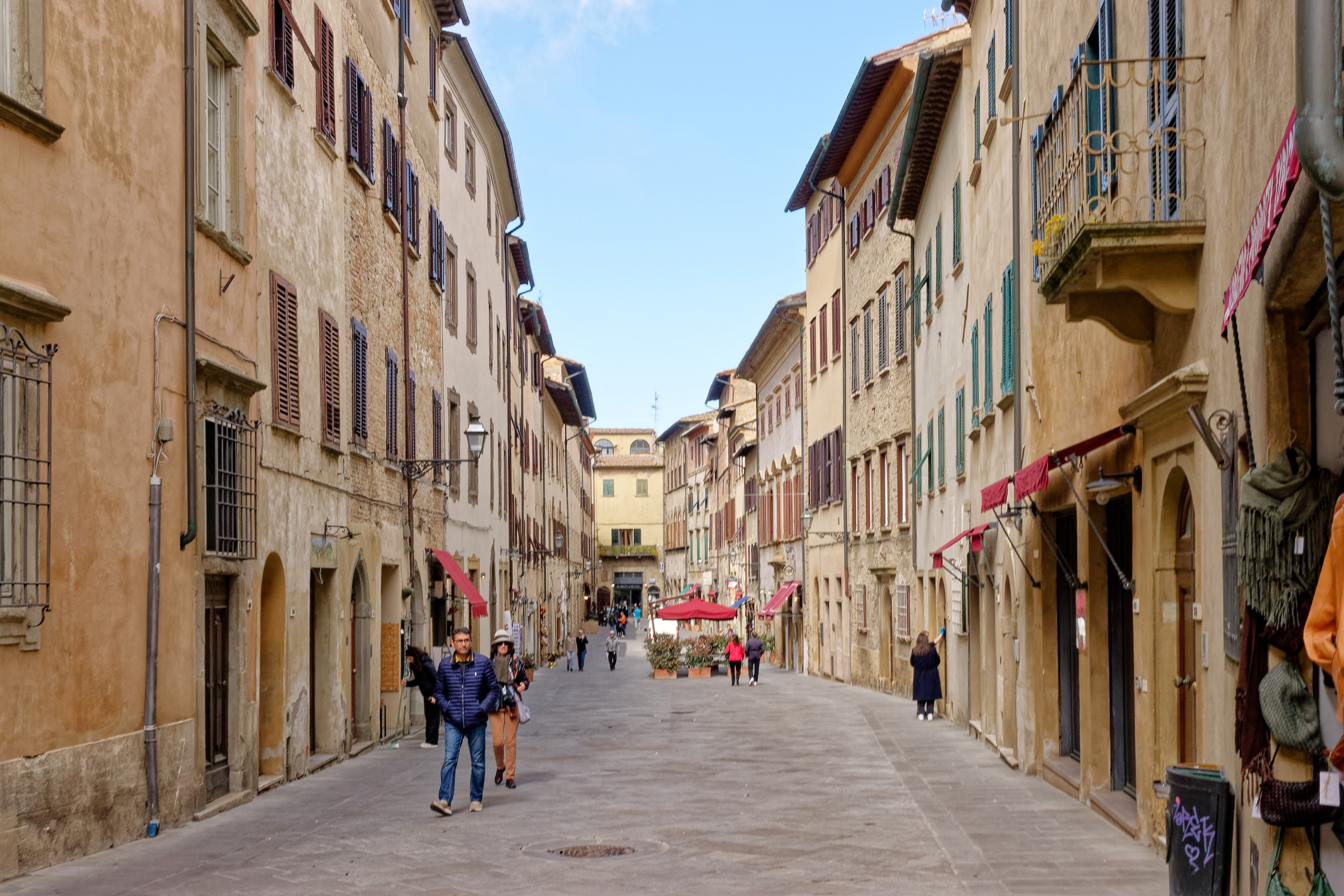
Street in the city centre

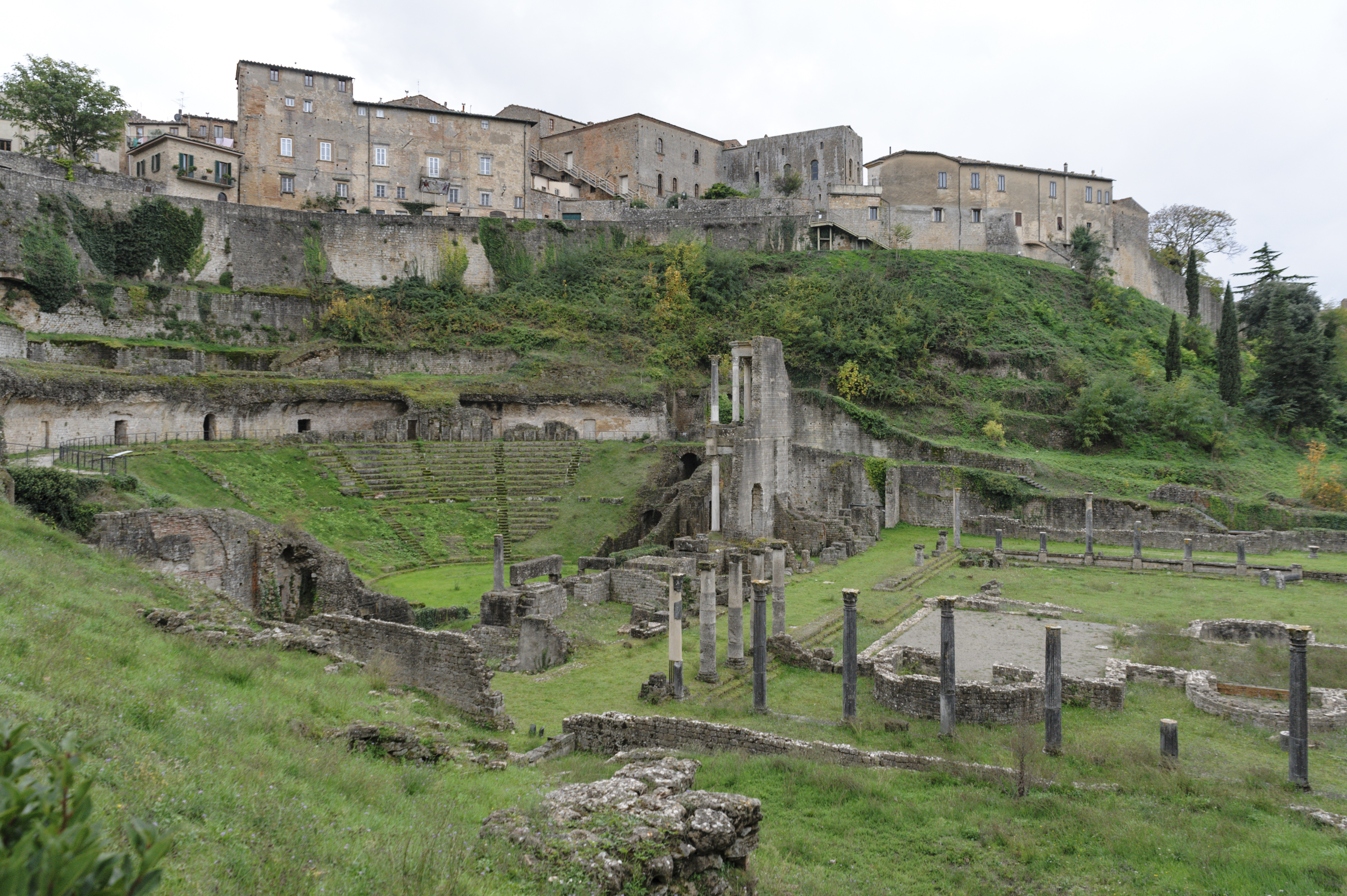
Roman theatre and the Etruscan Walls

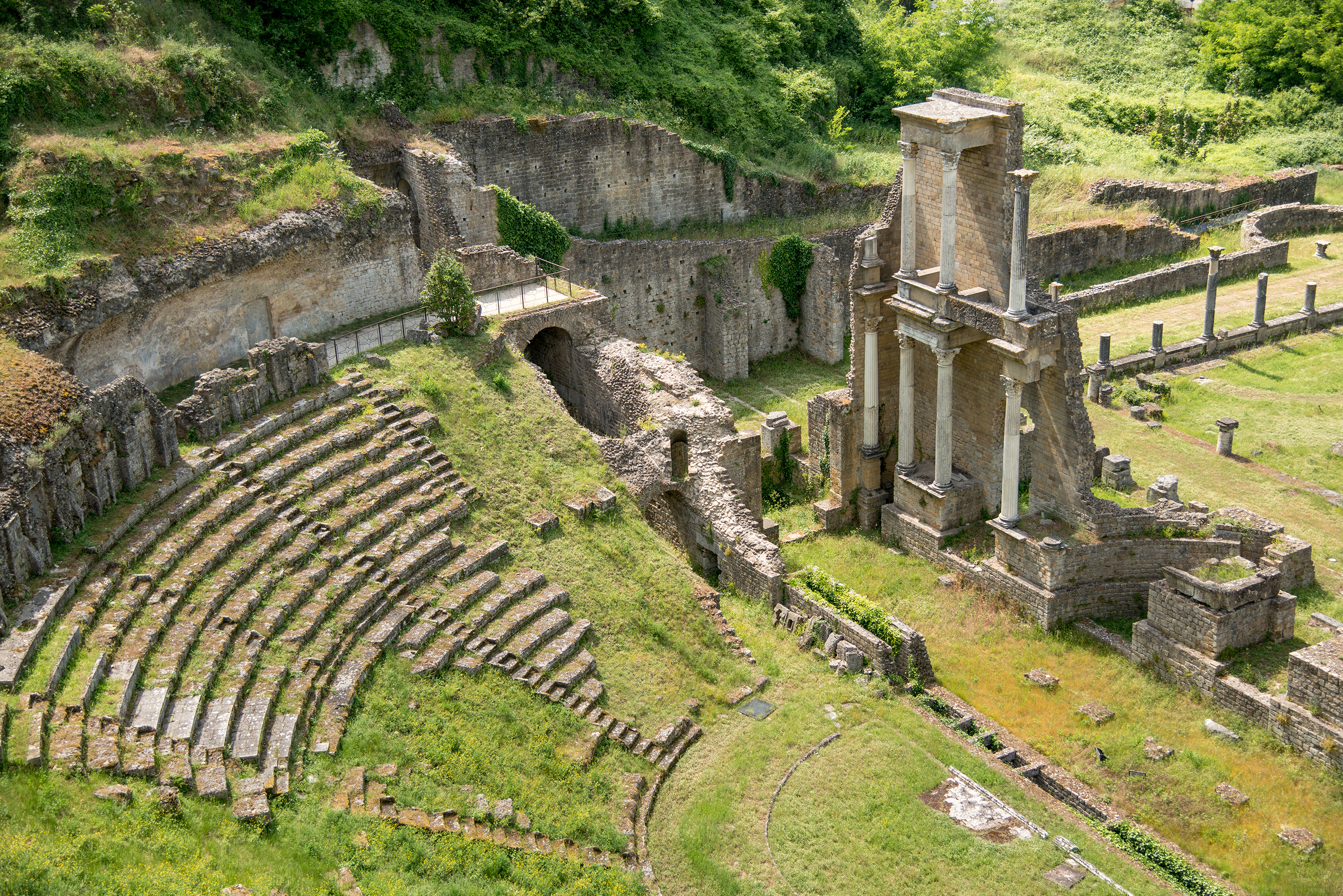
Roman theatre

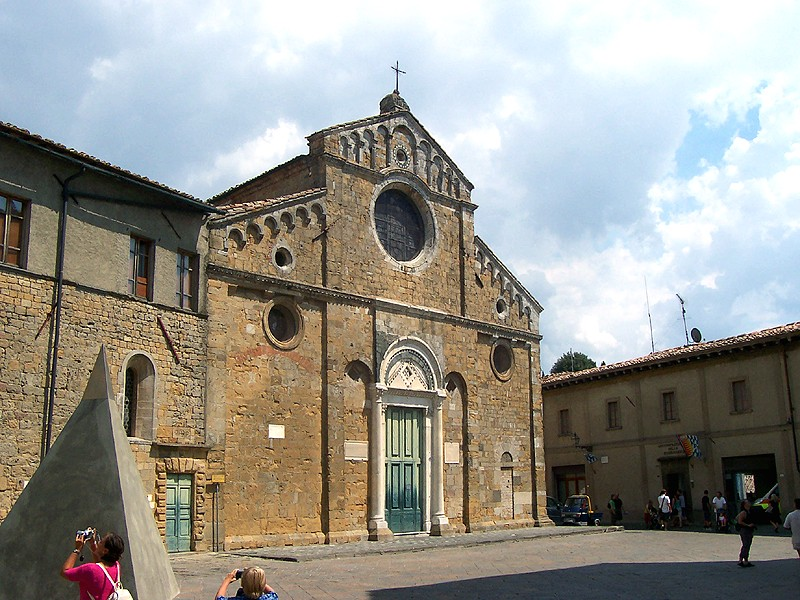
The Cathedral

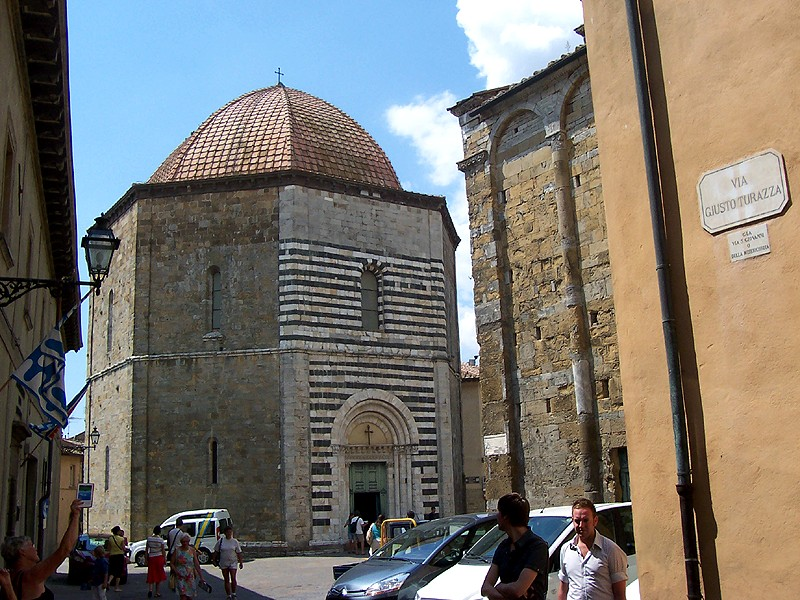
The Baptistry

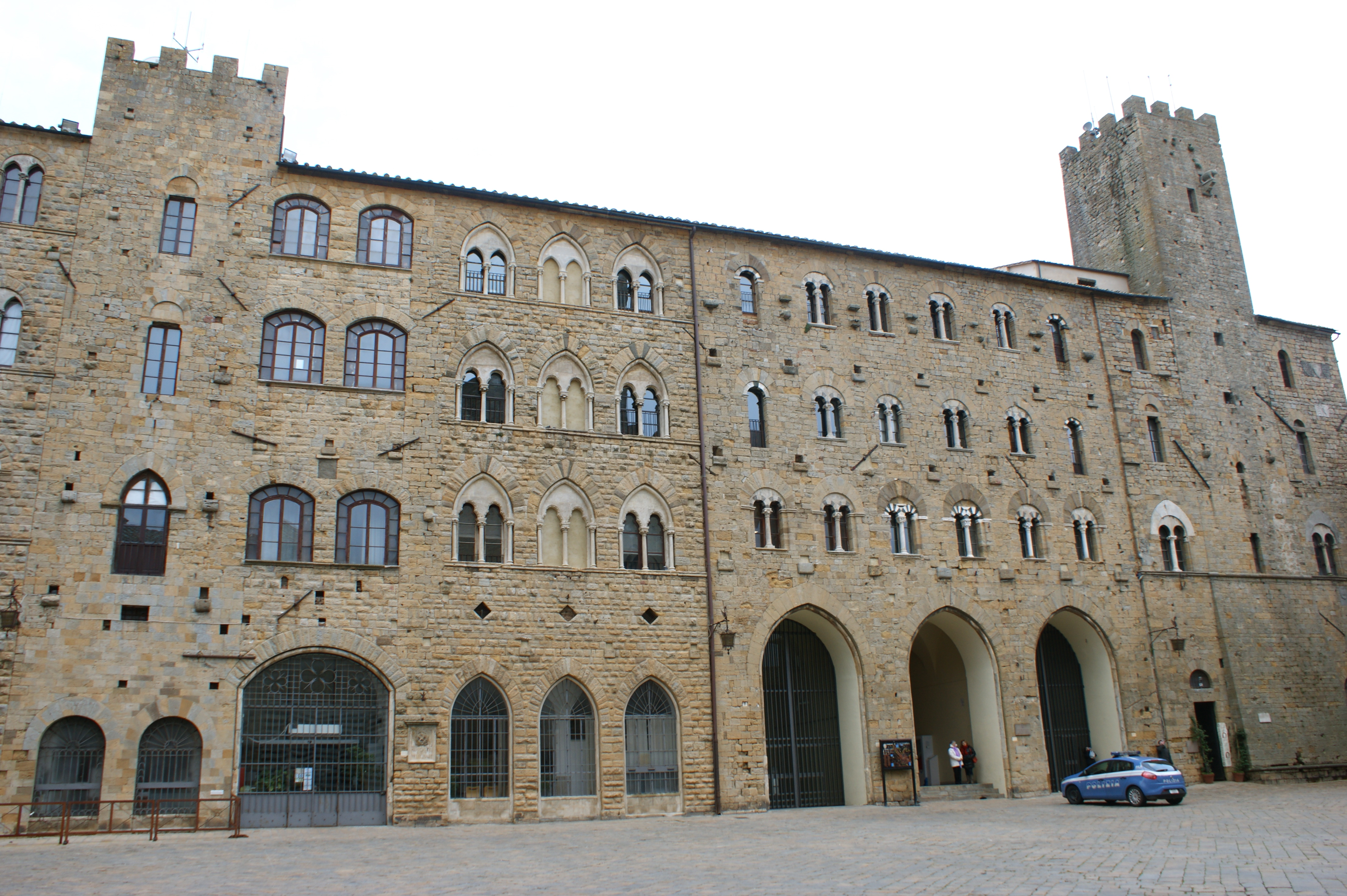
Palazzo Pretorio

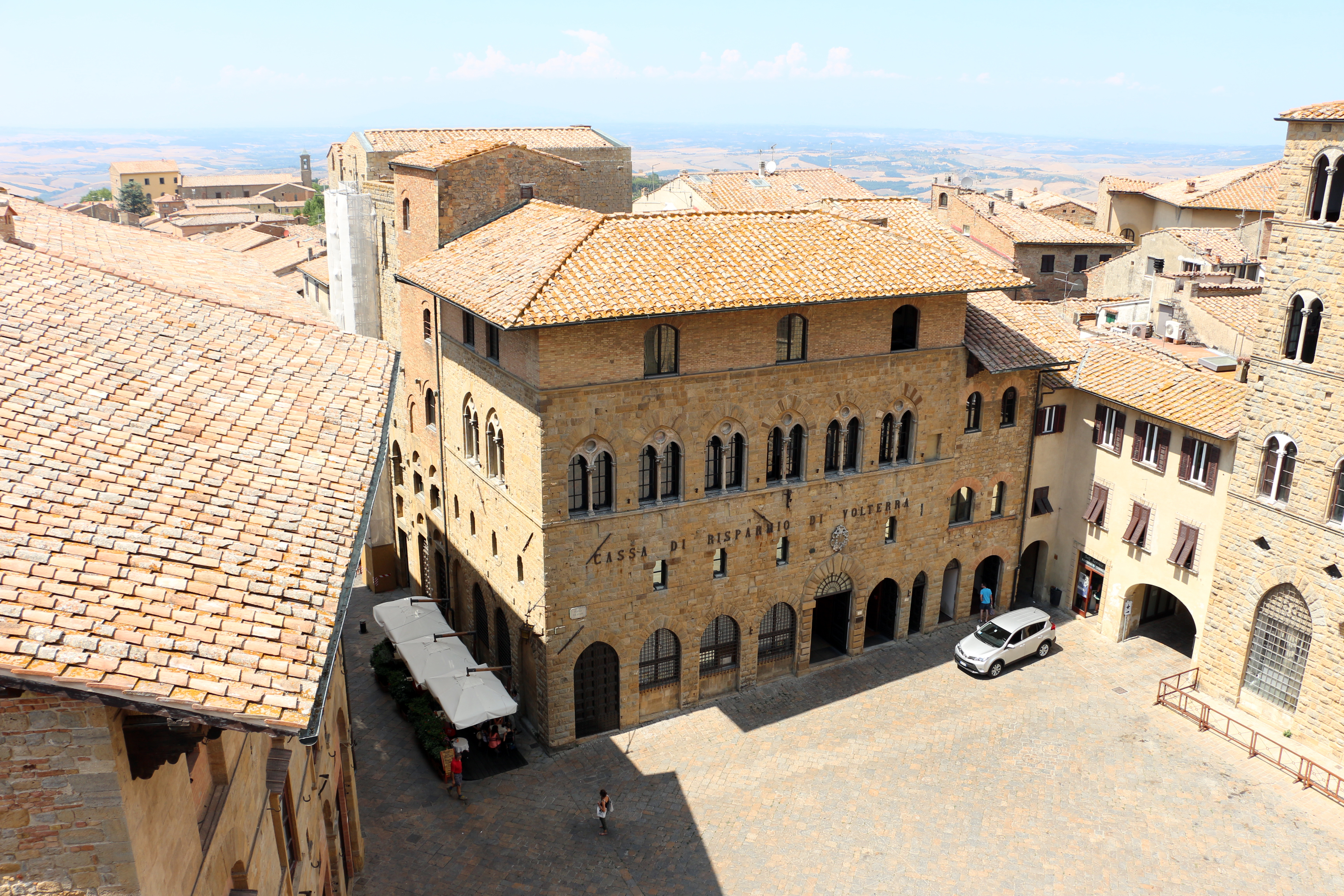
Palazzo Incontri

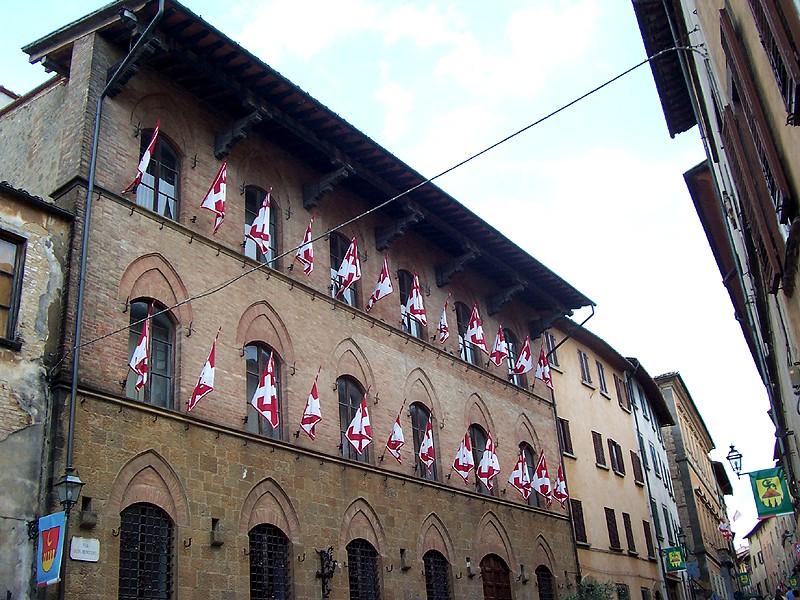
Public Library "Guarnacci"

== Bibliography ==
- Bell, Sinclair and Alexandra A. Carpino, eds. (2016) A Companion to the Etruscans. Blackwell Companions to the Ancient World. Chichester: John Wiley & Sons.
- Haynes, Sybille (2000) Etruscan civilization: A cultural history. Los Angeles: J. Paul Getty Museum.
- Pallottino, Massimo (1978) The Etruscans. Bloomington: Indiana University Press.
- Sprenger, Maia, and Bartoloni, Gilda (1983) The Etruscans: Their history, art and architecture. Translated by Robert E. Wolf. New York: Harry N. Abrams.
- Turfa, Jean MacIntosh, ed. (2013) The Etruscan World. Routledge Worlds. Abingdon, UK: Routledge.
