= Villamagna (disambiguation) =

Villamagna may refer to:

- Villamagna, a municipality in the province of Chieti, Italy
- Villamagna, Bagno a Ripoli, a village in the Metropolitan city of Florence, Italy
- Villamagna, Volterra, a village in the province of Pisa, Italy
- Villamagna in Proconsulari, an ancient Roman settlement in Africa and former bishopric
- Villamagna in Tripolitania, an ancient Roman settlement in Africa and former bishopric
- Villa Magna, an ancient imperial Roman villa in Lazio, Italy
- Villa Magna Condominiums, an urban development in Miami, Florida
