= Fiaschi =

Fiaschi is a surname. Notable people with the surname include:

- César Fiaschi (1891–1954), Argentine film actor
- Eleonora Elisa Fiaschi Tennant (1893–1963), Australian political activist
- Emilio Fiaschi (1858–1941), Italian sculptor
- Thomas Fiaschi (1855–1927), Italian-Australian military surgeon

== See also ==
- Fieschi family
