= Destination X (TV series) season 1 =

2026 season of television series

Destination X
- Season 1
- Hosted by: Jeffrey Dean Morgan
- Winner: Rick Szabo
- Runner-up: Peter Weber
- No. of episodes: 10

Release
- Original network: NBC
- Original release: May 27 – July 29, 2025

The first season of the American version of the television reality program Destination X premiered on May 27, 2025. The season is hosted by Jeffrey Dean Morgan.

== Format ==
In this competition series, contestants are sent to Europe and are transported by bus to various locations, while blindfolded. The primary objective is to guess the location to where they have been transported, and games are played along the way to gain clues. The contestant each week whose guess is farthest from their true location is eliminated, and the process is repeated. The last remaining contestant wins $250,000.

== Cast ==
The cast includes former Big Brother winner Josh Martinez; Peter Weber, a former Bachelor Nation and The Traitors contestant; and former Love Island contestant JaNa Craig.

Contestant	Age	Occupation/Original series	Hometown	Entered	Exited	Result
Josh Martinez	31	Big Brother 19	Miami, Florida	Episode 1	Episode 1	Eliminated 1st (in Rome, Italy)
Jonah Evarts	TBA	English teacher	Manhattan, Kansas	Episode 1	Episode 2	Eliminated 2nd (in Geneva, Switzerland)
Rachel Rossette	28	Sales consultant	Orlando, Florida	Episode 1	Episode 3	Eliminated 3rd (in Paris, France)
Tai Lowry	TBA	Attorney and flight attendant	Prince George's County, Maryland	Episode 1	Episode 4	Eliminated 4th (in Amsterdam, Netherlands)
Kim Conner	TBA	Child protective services	Kaneohe, Hawaii	Episode 1	Episode 5	Eliminated 5th (in Munich, Germany)
Mack Fitzgerald	TBA	State legislative attorney	Austin, Texas	Episode 1	Episode 6	Eliminated 6th (in Salzburg, Austria)
JaNa Craig	28	Love Island 6	Las Vegas, Nevada	Episode 3	Episode 7	Eliminated 7th (in Venice, Italy)
Ally Bross	27	Travel influencer	Orlando, Florida	Episode 1	Episode 8	Eliminated 8th (in Venice, Italy)
Shayne Cureton	TBA	Model	Indianapolis, Indiana	Episode 1	Episode 9	Eliminated 9th (in Monaco)
Biggy Bailey	TBA	Sports bettor	Chattanooga, Tennessee	Episode 1	Episode 10	Eliminated 10th (in London, England)
Peter Weber	33	The Bachelorette 15	Los Angeles, California	Episode 3	Episode 10	Runner-up (in London, England)
Rick Szabo	TBA	Professional bird watcher	Picton, Ontario, Canada	Episode 1	Episode 10	Winner (in London, England)

== Season summary ==
Destination X season summary
Episode			Challenge winner(s)		Eliminated
No.	Title	Air date	Reward	Map Room (Note: Every person who is safe from the map room is listed here as in some cases, a team lost but players on the losing team were safe.)	Eliminated
1	"Welcome to Destination X"	May 27, 2025	Ally [Mack] (Note: In addition to winning, Ally won the reward for herself and one other player of her choice; she chose Mack.)	Ally, Jonah, Kim, Mack, Rick	Josh Martinez
2	"Take It Up a Notch"	June 3, 2025	Ally, Rachel, Rick	Biggy, Kim, Rick, Shayne	Jonah Evarts
3	"Catching Feelings Changes Everything"	June 10, 2025	Shayne, Tai	Ally, Kim, Shayne, Tai	Rachel Rosette
4	"Let the Deceit Begin"	June 17, 2025	Biggy, Rick, Tai	Biggy (Note: As the winner of the second clue, Biggy was told the location for the round. At the risk of being eliminated, he needed to convince one player to pick the incorrect country. He managed to avoid elimination by convinving Tai to guess Brussels, Belgium.)	Tai Lowry
5	"Moral Compass"	June 24, 2025	Biggy, Mack, Rick, Shayne	Biggy, JaNa, Mack,	Kim Conner
6	"The Most Haunted Castle in Europe"	July 1, 2025	Ally (Note: In addition to winning the reward challenge, Ally won immunity for herself. Thus, she did not participate in the map room challenge.)	Ally, Rick, [Biggy] (Note: In addition to winning, Rick won immunity for himself and one other player of his choice; he chose Biggy.)	Mack Fitzgerald
7	"The Clues Were There All Along"	July 8, 2025	Rick, Shayne	Ally, Biggy, Shayne	JaNa Craig
8	"The Knives Are Out"	July 15, 2025	Ally, Biggy, Peter, Rick, Shayne (Note: In this challenge, players individually memorized ten masks, and then identified two that they previously saw. They earned a dagger for each they correctly identified. All players correctly identified two, earning them the same reward.)	Rick, Ally, Peter (Note: This episode featured a game where the player who lost was eliminated instead of players proceeding to the map room.)	Ally Bross
9	"How's Your Poker Face?"	July 22, 2025	N/A	Biggy, Peter, Rick, Shayne	Shayne Cureton
10	"The Grand Finale"	July 29, 2025	N/A	Peter, Rick	Biggy Bailey, Peter Weber

Notes

"Destination X" locations for season one (2025)

== Results ==
Place	Contestant	Episodes									
Place	Contestant	1	2	3	4	5	6	7	8 (Note: This episode featured a game where the player who lost was eliminated instead of players proceeding to the map room.)	9	10
1	Rick	SAFE	SAFE	RISK	RISK	RISK	SAFE	RISK	RISK	RISK	WINNER
2	Peter	N/A (Note: JaNa and Peter both entered the game at the end of episode 3.)		IN	RISK	RISK	RISK (Note: As Peter was the closest to the tiebreaker question, he chose to eliminate Mack)	RISK	RISK	RISK	RUNNER-UP
3	Biggy	RISK	SAFE	RISK	SAFE (Note: As the winner of the second clue, Biggy was told the location for the round. At the risk of being eliminated, he needed to convince one player to pick the incorrect country. He avoided elimination by convincing Tai to guess Brussels, Belgium.)	SAFE	SAFE	SAFE	SAFE	RISK	OUT
4	Shayne	RISK	SAFE	SAFE	RISK	RISK	RISK	SAFE	SAFE	OUT	
5	Ally	SAFE	RISK	SAFE	RISK	RISK	SAFE	SAFE	OUT		
6	JaNa	N/A		IN	RISK	SAFE	RISK	OUT			
7	Mack	SAFE	RISK	RISK	RISK	SAFE	OUT				
8	Kim	SAFE	SAFE	SAFE	RISK	OUT					
9	Tai	RISK	RISK	SAFE	OUT						
10	Rachel	RISK	RISK	OUT							
11	Jonah	SAFE	OUT								
12	Josh	OUT									

== Episodes ==
No.	Title	Original release date	U.S. viewers (millions)	Rating/share (18-49)
1	"Welcome to Destination X"	May 27, 2025	2.10	0.3/4
Episode 1 Results: Tags Collected & Answers Correct: Josh: 8 tags - 4 correct; Biggy: 6 tags - 6 correct; Ally: 10 tags - 7 correct (WINNER) [clue location: Ruins of Volterra]; Team Captains & Clue Partners: Ally & Mack Teams: [in town of Orvieto]: Team Ally: Ally, Shayne, Biggy, Tai, Josh; Team Mack: Mack, Kim, Jonah, Rachel, Rick; Searchers: Mack & Biggy Riddle Partners: Team Ally: One coin; Tai & Shayne (Round 1); Ally & Josh (Round 2); Team Mack: Four coins (WINNER); Rachel & Rick (Round 1); Kim & Jonah (Round 2); Map Room: Team Ally; Shayne (Rome); Tai (Rome); Josh (Milan, Italy); Biggy (Rome); Team Mack; Rachel (Northern Italy, South of Milan); Location: Colosseum in Rome Contestant Eliminated: Josh
2	"Take It Up a Notch"	June 3, 2025	2.11	0.3/5
Episode 2 Results: Mountain Challenge Teams: Yellow: Shayne, Jonah, Mack; Red: Biggy, Kim, Tai; Purple: Ally, Rachel, Rick (WINNER) [clue location: Sphinx Observatory]; Map Room Challenge Choosers: [in chalet of Flendruz]: Shayne; Rachel; Mack; Jonah; Biggy; Ally; Ally, Tai; Rachel; Kim (Swapped with Mack); Jonah; Biggy; Rick (Swapped with Ally); Mack, Rachel, Biggy; Tai (Swapped with Rachel); Kim; Jonah; Ally (Swapped with Biggy); Rick; Jonah; Tai; Kim; Mack (Swapped with Jonah); Ally; Rick; Kim, Rick; Tai; Jonah (Swapped with Kim); Mack; Ally; Rachel (Swapped with Rick); Map Room: Tai (Geneva, Switzerland); Jonah (Bern, Switzerland); Mack (Bern, Switzerland); Ally (Geneva, Switzerland); Rachel (Bern, Switzerland); Location: Lake Geneva in Geneva, Switzerland Contestant Eliminated: Jonah
3	"Catching Feelings Changes Everything"	June 10, 2025	1.81	0.2/3
Episode 3 Results: Maze Challenge Pairs: Tai & Shayne (WINNER); Kim & Rachel; Mack & Rick; Ally & Biggy; Chateau Challenge Head-to-Head: Tai (WINNER) vs. Rachel; Mack vs. Kim (WINNER); Shayne vs. Rick (WINNER); Biggy vs. Ally (WINNER); Map Room Challenge Choosers: Save (Tai); Shayne; Send (Shayne); Rick; Map Room: Biggy (Paris); Mack (Paris); Rachel (Cannes, France); Rick (Paris); Location: Eiffel Tower in Paris Contestant Eliminated: Rachel
4	"Let the Deceit Begin"	June 17, 2025	1.90	0.2/3
Episode 4 Results: Dining Challenge Teams: Team Tai: Tai, Rick & Biggy (WINNER); Team Mack: Mack, Kim & Peter; Team Ally: Ally, Shayne & JaNa; While Tai was part of the winning team, she was in a separate location and couldn't receive the clue, which was being able to see the sights of Volendam while suspended in the air where her partners, Biggy and Rick completed their half of the challenge. Shifting Dunes Challenge: Biggy (WINNER); As the winner of the second clue, Biggy was informed of Destination X, but if he could not convince someone to pick the wrong country, he would be eliminated instead of the furthest player from Destination X. Map Room: Ally (Amsterdam, Netherlands); JaNa (Amsterdam, Netherlands); Kim (Amsterdam, Netherlands); Mack (Amsterdam, Netherlands); Peter (Amsterdam, Netherlands); Rick (Amsterdam, Netherlands); Shayne (Amsterdam, Netherlands); Tai (Brussels, Belgium); Location: Canals of Amsterdam, Netherlands Contestant Eliminated: Tai
5	"Moral Compass"	June 24, 2025	1.84	0.2/4
Episode 5 Results: Train Challenge Teams: Biggy, Shayne, Mack & Rick (WINNER); Ally, Kim, JaNa & Peter; Map Room Challenge Basket Claims: Rick: Magic Mirror (Actually Poisonous Apple); Ally: Cookies (Actually Poisonous Apple); Mack: Magic Mirror; Biggy: Magic Mirror (Actually Cookies); Kim: Poisonous Apple; Peter: Poisonous Apple (Actually Cookies); Shayne: Cookies; JaNa: Magic Mirror; Map Room Challenge Baskets Swap: Mack keeps her basket; Shayne keeps his basket; JaNa keeps her basket; Ally swaps her basket with Rick; Peter keeps his basket; Kim keeps her basket; Biggy keeps his basket; Rick swaps his basket with Kim; Map Room Challenge Basket Contents: Rick: Poisonous Apple (taken from Kim); Ally: Poisonous Apple (taken from Rick); Mack: Magic Mirror; Biggy: Cookies; Kim: Poisonous Apple (Given by Rick); Peter: Cookies; Shayne: Cookies; JaNa: Magic Mirror; The Magic Mirror's power is revealed (by Heidi Klum as the Magic Mirror) to be sending another player into the Map Room. Magic Mirror - Map Room Nominations: Mack: Peter; JaNa: Shayne; Map Room: Rick (Munich, Germany); Ally (Stuttgart, Germany); Kim (Frankfurt, Germany); Peter (Munich, Germany); Shayne (Stuttgart, Germany); Location: Oktoberfest in Munich, Germany Contestant Eliminated: Kim
6	"The Most Haunted Castle in Europe"	July 1, 2025	1.61	0.2/3
Episode 6 Results: Castle Challenge [at Moosham Castle]: Rick, Peter, Shayne, Biggy, Ally and JaNa (WON); Mack (LOST); Rick, Peter and Shayne go to the library and Biggy, Ally and JaNa go to the chapel. Mack goes to the dungeon Riddle Challenge: Library; Rick (WON); Peter and Shayne (LOST); Chapel; Ally (WON); Biggy and JaNa (LOST); Peter, Shayne, Biggy and JaNa join Mack in the dungeon. Ally solves the last riddle and heads to the tower while Rick joins the others in the dungeon. Ally chooses Shayne to join her in the tower. Map Room Challenge (feat. Constance and the Belting Berthas) Winner: Rick Rick chooses to save Biggy from the Map Room Map Room: JaNa (Salzburg, Austria); Peter (Salzburg, Austria); Mack (Salzburg, Austria); Shayne (Salzburg, Austria); As Peter was the closest to the tiebreaker question, he chose to eliminate Mack Location: Salzburg, Austria Contestant Eliminated: Mack (by Peter)
7	"The Clues Were There All Along"	July 8, 2025	1.96	0.3/5
Episode 7 Results: Canoeing Challenge [Location: Tagliamento River, Northern Italy]: Rick & Shayne (3/3, WON); Biggy & Peter (1/3, LOST); Ally & JaNa (0/3, LOST); For winning, Rick & Shayne received a postcard with the Bridge of Sighs in Venice, Italy on it. War Map Room Challenge Location: Palmanova, Italy: Red Team: Ally, Biggy, Shayne (WON); Blue Team: JaNa, Peter, Rick (LOST); Map Room: JaNa (Split, Croatia); Peter (Trieste, Italy); Rick (Ljubljana, Slovenia); Location: Grand Canal in Venice, Italy Contestant Eliminated: JaNa
8	"The Knives Are Out"	July 15, 2025	1.93	0.2/4
Episode 8 Results: Players were immediately told they were in Venice, Italy at the start of the round. Instead, players competed in challenges, with the loser of the last being eliminated. Mask Challenge [Location: Grand Canal in Venice, Italy]: Biggy (4, 9) (2 correct - 2 daggers); Rick (18, 20) (2 correct - 2 daggers); Peter (2, 11) (2 correct - 2 daggers); Ally (5 12) (2 correct - 2 daggers); Shayne (10, 14) (2 correct - 2 daggers); Each player in turn placed their daggers onto other players. The three players with the most daggers would be nominated for elimination and enter the Garden of Lost Souls. Dagger Nominations: Biggy (Ally (1), Shayne (1), Peter (1)); Rick (Ally (1), Shayne (2)); Ally (Rick (2), Peter (1)); Shayne (Rick (2), Peter (1)); Peter (Biggy (2), Ally (1)); Rick has 4 daggers; Ally, Shayne and Peter have 3 daggers; Biggy has 2 daggers. Rick goes to the Garden of Lost Souls. Biggy has to decide who is safe to break a three-way tie. Biggy chooses Shayne. Ally and Peter join Rick in the Garden of Lost Souls. Garden of Lost Souls Challenge: Rick; Leaning Tower of Pisa (Correct); Stonehenge (Correct); Tower of London (Correct); Ally; Vatican City (Correct); Paris (Correct); Rome (Correct); MannekenPis (Correct); Ireland (Incorrect); Peter; The Louvre (Correct); Berlin Wall (Correct); Spain (Correct); The Acropolis (Correct); Contestant Eliminated: Ally
9	"How's Your Poker Face?"	July 22, 2025	1.82	0.2/4
Episode 9 Results: Players were each given an individual clue at Tabernas Desert, Spain, with each relating to a card suit along with a general clue ("There's no place like home") hiding the letters of Destination X. Individual Clues: Biggy (Golf balls -> CLUBS); Peter (Shovels in sand -> SPADES); Rick (Red ring boxes inscribed with M.M. -> DIAMONDS); Shayne (Artichokes -> HEARTS); After a day to strategize, players went directly to the map room. Map Room: Biggy (near Saint-Tropez); Peter (Cannes); Rick (Cannes); Shayne (Milan); Players were then brought onto a yacht where they played a game of roulette, betting on red or black in turn. If their bet was correct, they drew a card deciding to move their own X or another player's X. At the end of the game, the player whose X was furthest from Destination X would be eliminated. X Roulette Challenge Round 1: Rick; Black – Swaps his and Peter's X; Shayne; Black but actually Red – Lost a turn; Biggy; Black but actually Red – Lost a turn; Peter; Red – Swaps Biggy's and Shayne's Xs; Round 2: Rick; Black – Puts Biggy's X (close to Milan) 50 miles farther from Destination X; Shayne; Red – Puts Biggy's X back to its original spot (near Saint-Tropez); Peter; Red – Puts Rick's X 50 miles closer (directly onto) Destination X; Biggy; Black – Moves his X 50 miles closer to Destination X; Location: Monaco Contestant Eliminated: Shayne
10	"The Grand Finale"	July 29, 2025	2.08	0.2/4
Episode 10 Results: Players were brought to the Painted Hall in the Old Royal Naval College and played a trivia game. Players started directly in front of Jeffrey with 9 spaces behind them. On a correct answer, they were forced to move either themselves forward or move another player backwards - movement goes as far as possible, with selecting a decision that would cause no change not being allowed (ex: moving a player at the front space forward). The game could end after any question, with the furthest player at that point being immediately eliminated from the game. Greenwich Challenge: Question 1: 1 space; Biggy: London (Incorrect); Rick: Verona (Correct; moves Biggy back one); Peter: Milan (Incorrect); Question 2: 1 space; Biggy: Switzerland (Correct; moves Peter back one); Rick: Switzerland (Correct; moves Biggy back two); Peter: Italy (Incorrect); Question 3: 2 spaces; Biggy: Munich (Correct; moves himself up two); Rick: Munich (Correct; moves Biggy back two); Peter: Munich (Correct; moves Biggy back two); Question 4: 1 spaces; Biggy: Unknown (answer not shown); Rick: True (Correct; moves Biggy back one); Peter: Unknown (answer not shown); Question 5: 3 spaces; Biggy: Grimm Brothers (Correct; moves Peter back three); Rick: Grimm Brothers (Correct; moves Biggy back three); Peter: Grimm Brothers (Correct; moves himself up three); Question 6: 2 spaces; Biggy: Paris (Correct; moves Peter back two); Rick: Athens (Incorrect); Peter: Athens (Incorrect); Question 7: 3 spaces; Biggy: Vatican City (Correct; moves Peter back two); Rick: The Holy Sea/Vatican City (Correct; moves Peter back three (forced move)); Peter: Italy (Incorrect); At the end of the game, both Biggy and Peter were on the same space and had a tiebreaker question to survive. Tiebreaker Question: How many islands make up Venice? (correct answer: 118): Biggy: 210 (off by 92, ELIMINATED); Peter: 27 (off by 91, SAFE); Contestant Eliminated: Biggy After Biggy's elimination, the final two players were given three riddles in a row, linking to various landmarks around London. If they went to the correct location, they received a clue to Destination X - if they were incorrect, they would receive nothing. After all three riddles, players had 90 seconds to use their acquired clues to locate Destination X in a "Map Room brought to them", with the closest to Destination X winning the season. Destination X Challenge: Peter; Rome - Money is Power; Bank of England (Correct); Amsterdam - Getting High; The Shard (Correct); Monaco - Play Your Hand; Tower Bridge (Correct); Rick; Rome - Money is Power; Bank of England (Correct); Paris - Lost in Love; Piccadilly Circus (Correct); Salzburg - Playing Detective; Baker Street (Correct); Map Room: Peter (Tower of London); Rick (Big Ben); Contestant Eliminated: Peter (Runner-Up) Location: Big Ben in London, England Winner: Rick

=== Special ===
Title	Original release date	U.S. viewers (millions)	Rating (18–49)
"Sneak Preview of Destination X"	May 3, 2025	2.52	0.4/6
