= Bessi (surname) =

Bessi is a surname. Notable people with the surname include:

- Ambrogio Bessi (1915–1997). Italian basketball player
- Cédric Bessi (born 1990), Monégasque judoka
- Eric-Louis Bessi (born 1958), Monegasque judoka
- Gilbert Bessi (born 1958), Monegasque bobsledder and sprinter
- Giuseppe Bessi (1857–1922), Italian sculptor
