= Montemiccioli =

- Frazione
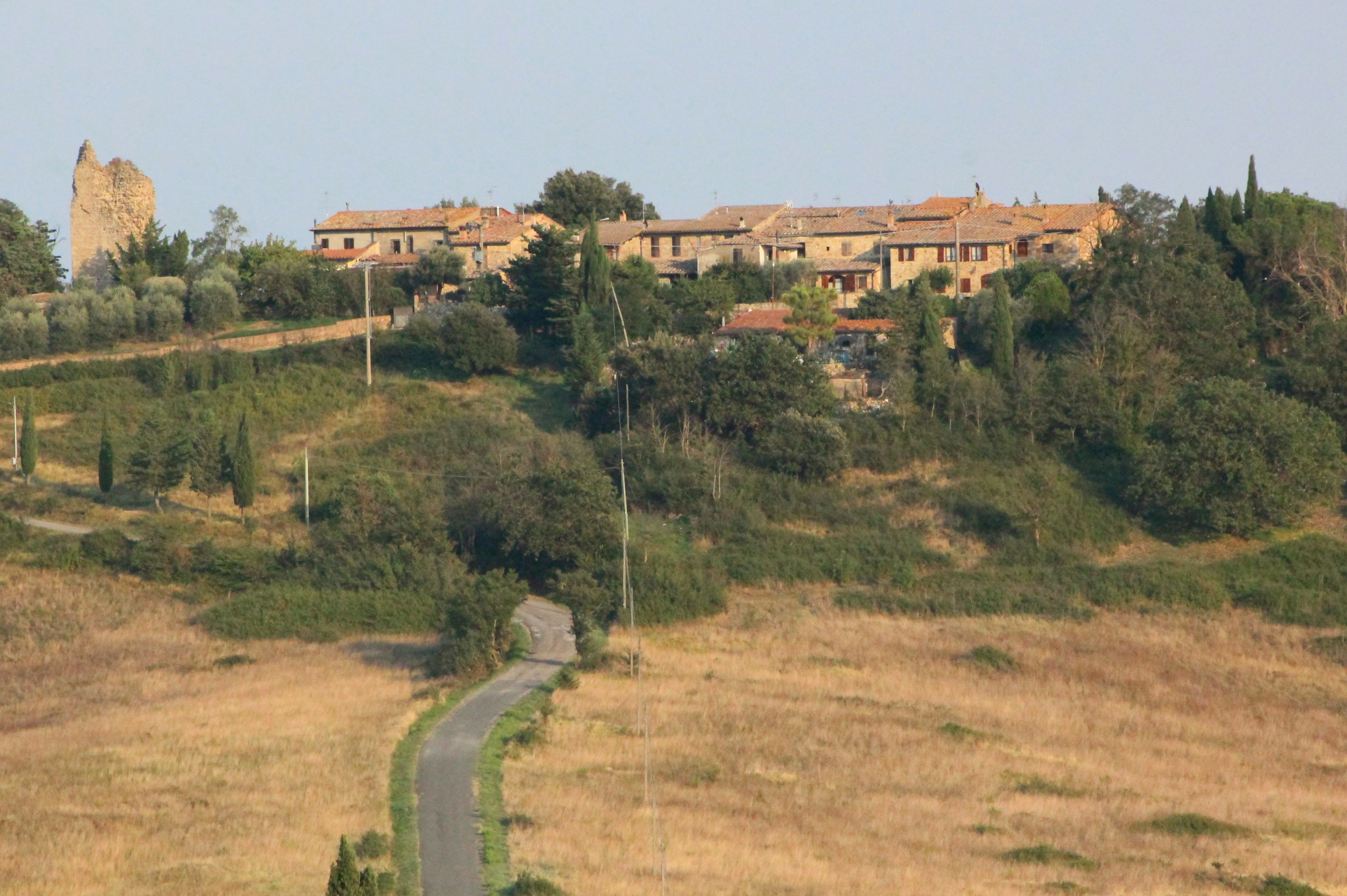

- Location of Montemiccioli in Italy
- Coordinates: 43°23′58″N 10°59′41″E
- Country: Italy
- Region: Tuscany
- Province: Pisa (PI)
- Comune: Volterra
- Elevation: 460 m (1,510 ft)

Population
  - Total: 95
- Time zone: UTC+1 (CET)
  - Summer (DST): UTC+2 (CEST)
- Postal code: 56048
- Dialing code: (+39) 0588

Montemiccioli is a village in Tuscany, central Italy, administratively a frazione of the comune of Volterra, province of Pisa. At the time of the 2006 parish census its population was 95.

Montemiccioli is about 76 km from Pisa and 13 km from Volterra.
