= Mazzolla =

- Frazione
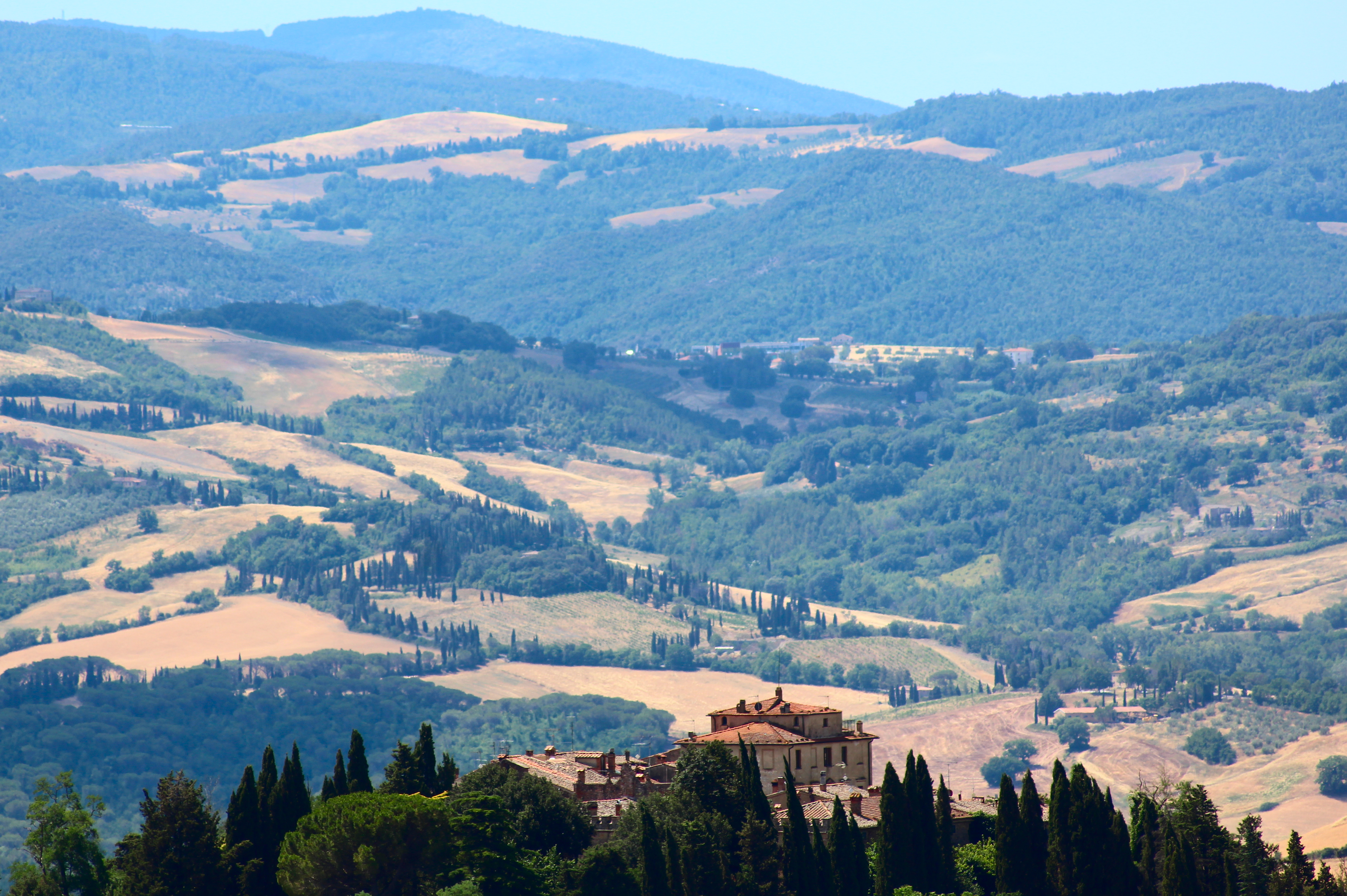

- Location of Mazzolla in Italy
- Coordinates: 43°22′8″N 10°54′19″E
- Country: Italy
- Region: Tuscany
- Province: Pisa (PI)
- Comune: Volterra
- Elevation: 351 m (1,152 ft)

Population (2001)
  - Total: 46
- Demonym: Mazzolani
- Time zone: UTC+1 (CET)
  - Summer (DST): UTC+2 (CEST)
- Postal code: 56048
- Dialing code: (+39) 0588

Mazzolla is a village in Tuscany, central Italy, administratively a frazione of the comune of Volterra, province of Pisa.

Mazzolla was first mentioned in public documents in 1080. In the 14th and 15th centuries there are mentions of a castle. In the last decades the opulation decreased sensibly: at the time of the 2001 census its population was 46.
