= Volterra Psychiatric Hospital =

Geography
- Location: Volterra, Tuscany, Italy
- Coordinates: 43.4004°N 10.8760°E

Organisation
- Type: Specialist

Services
- Speciality: Psychiatric hospital

History
- Opened: 1888, 2018
- Closed: 1978

Links
- Lists: Hospitals in Italy

Volterra Psychiatric Hospital (Italian: Ospedale Psichiatrico di Volterra) is a former psychiatric hospital in the city of Volterra in the Italian region of Tuscany. Founded in 1888, the hospital was known for its brutal treatment of inmates. It remained open until 1978, when it was closed following the passage of Law 180, which directed the closing down of all existing psychiatric hospitals.

The hospital was a self-sustaining settlement: patients grew crops, raised livestock and made their own clothes. Many patients were there for decades and there was no social reintegration.

The 2016 psychological horror video game The Town of Light is set in a fictionalized version of the hospital.
