= Ombra della sera =

Ancient Etruscan statue

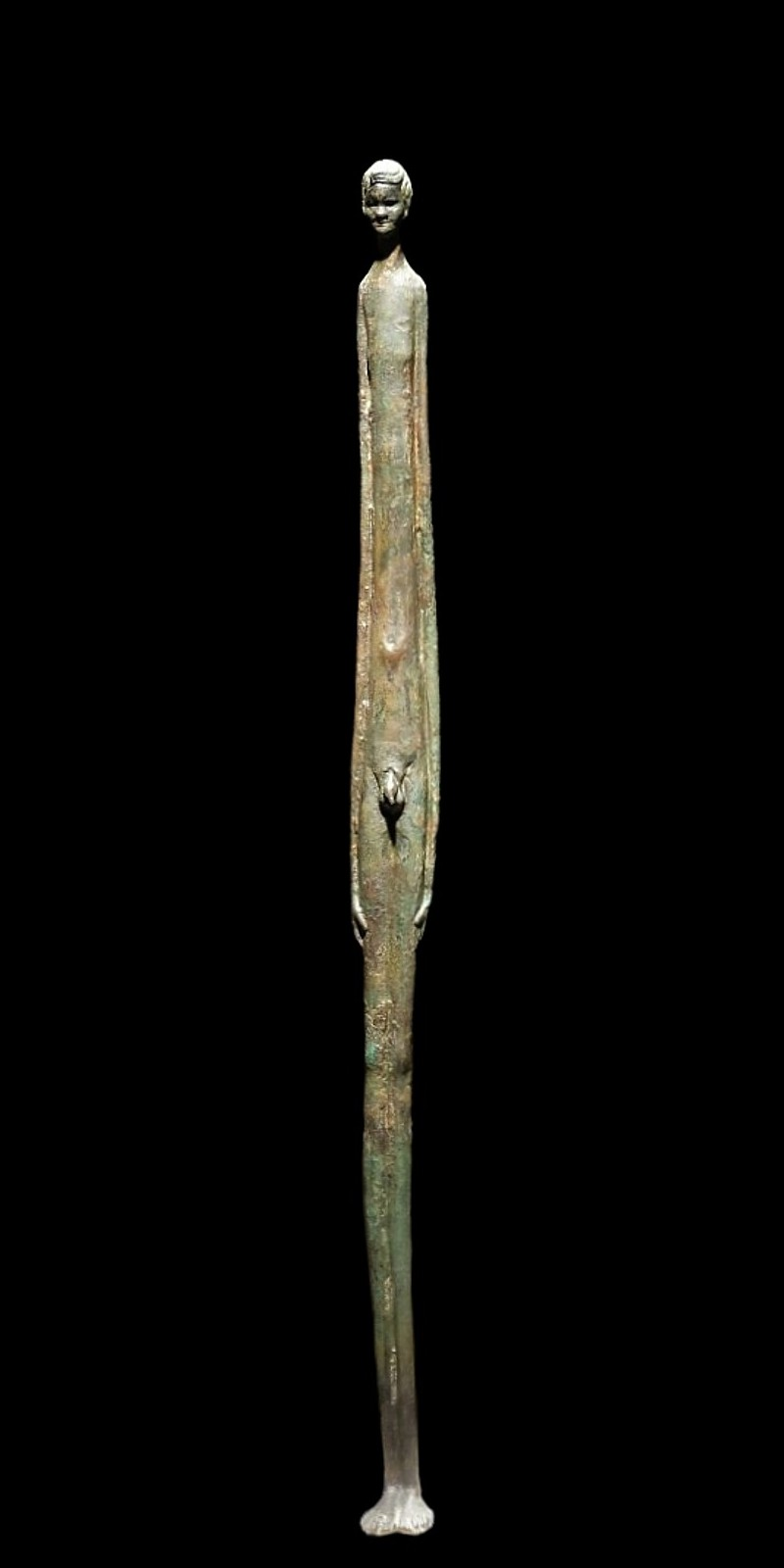
The Ombra della sera

Ombra della sera (Italian for "Shadow of the evening") is an Etruscan statue from the town of Velathri, later Volterra. It was first depicted in a 1737 collection of Etruscan antiquities. Similarities to the work of modern artist Alberto Giacometti have been frequently observed.

== Features ==
The statue is made of bronze and represents a nude male, 57.5 centimetres (22.6 in) long, with very elongated body but head in normal proportions. It is estimated by archaeologists to date from the third century BC.
