= Baptistery of San Giovanni, Volterra =

Building in Volterra, Italy

Coordinates: 43°24′06″N 10°51′30″E

Baptistery of San Giovanni (Volterra)
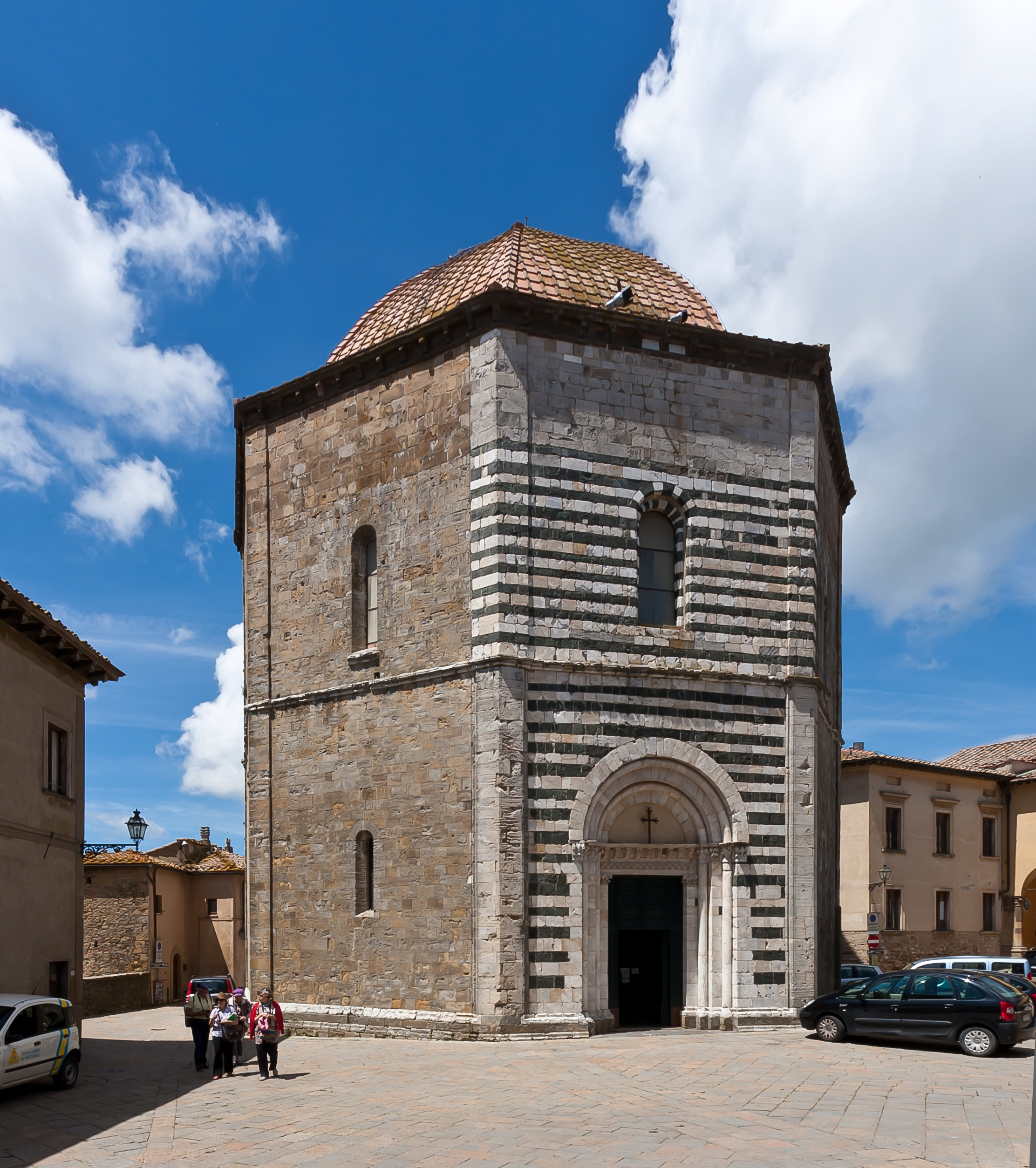

Religion
- Affiliation: Roman Catholic

Location
- Location: Volterra, Italy
- Interactive map of Baptistery of San Giovanni (Volterra)

Architecture
- Type: Baptistery
- Style: Early-Renaissance
- Groundbreaking: 13th century

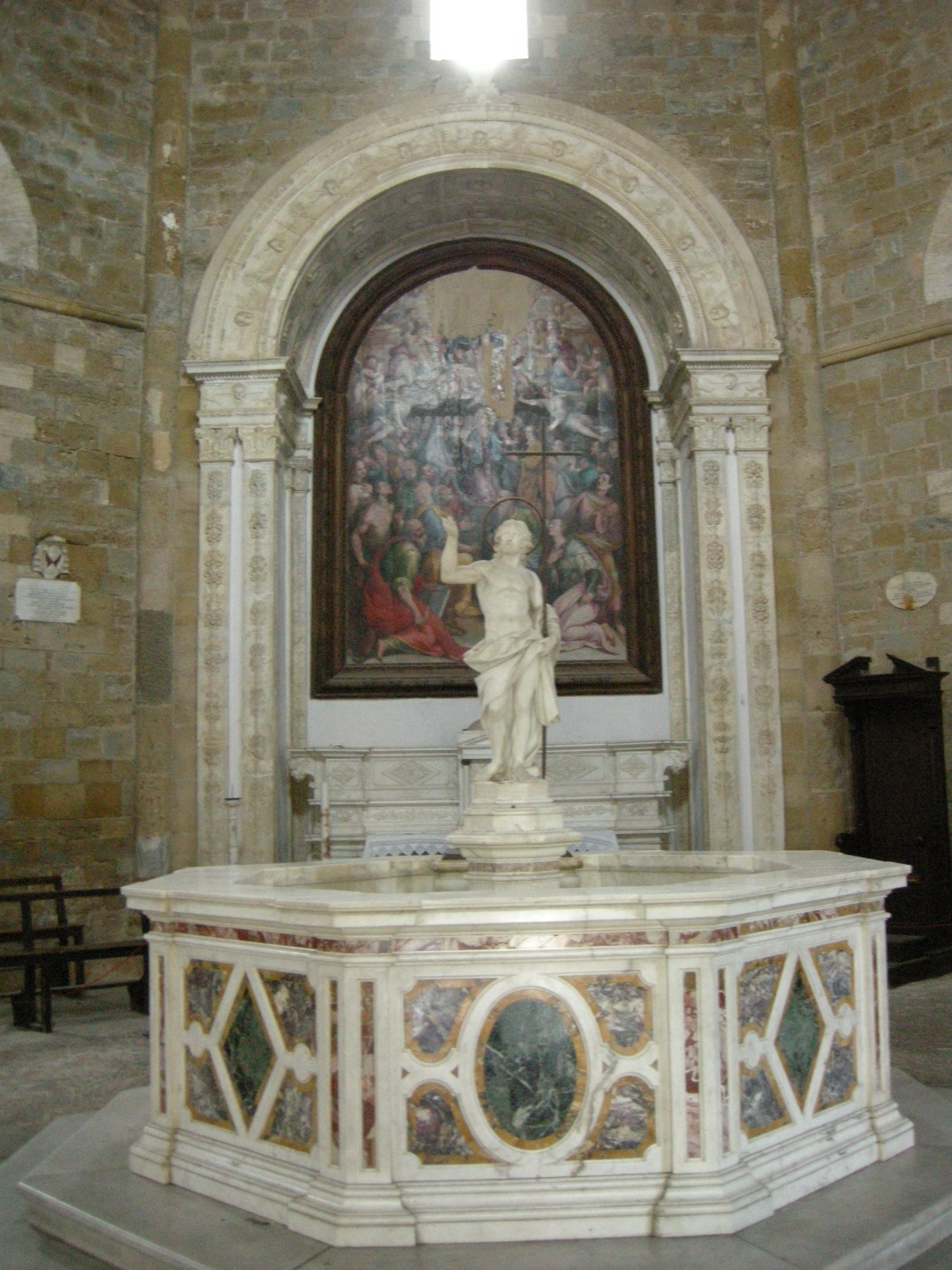
Baptismal font by Giovanni Vaccà

The Baptistery of San Giovanni an octagonal thirteenth-century religious building standing just in front of the Duomo of Volterra, in the center of the city. It was supposedly first built in the seventh century at the site of a Roman temple dedicated to Sun worship.

The façade is decorated with horizontal bands of white and dark green marble. The Romanesque Portal has been attributed to a follower of Nicola Pisano. The sixteenth-century altar inside has been assigned to Balsimelli da Settignano, using a design by Mino da Fiesole. It has a painting (partially damaged during World War Two of the Assumption of the Virgin by Niccolò Circignani. Beside that altar is a marble font (1502) is by Andrea Sansovino. The Ciborium (1471) was completed by Mino da Fiesole. The baptismal font (1759) by Giovanni Vaccà. Above it rises a statue of St John the Baptist (1771) by Giovanni Antonio Cybei. The holy water receptacle is an ancient Roman sarcophagus.
