= Sant'Alessandro, Volterra =

Roman Catholic parish church in Tuscany, Italy

Sant'Alessandro
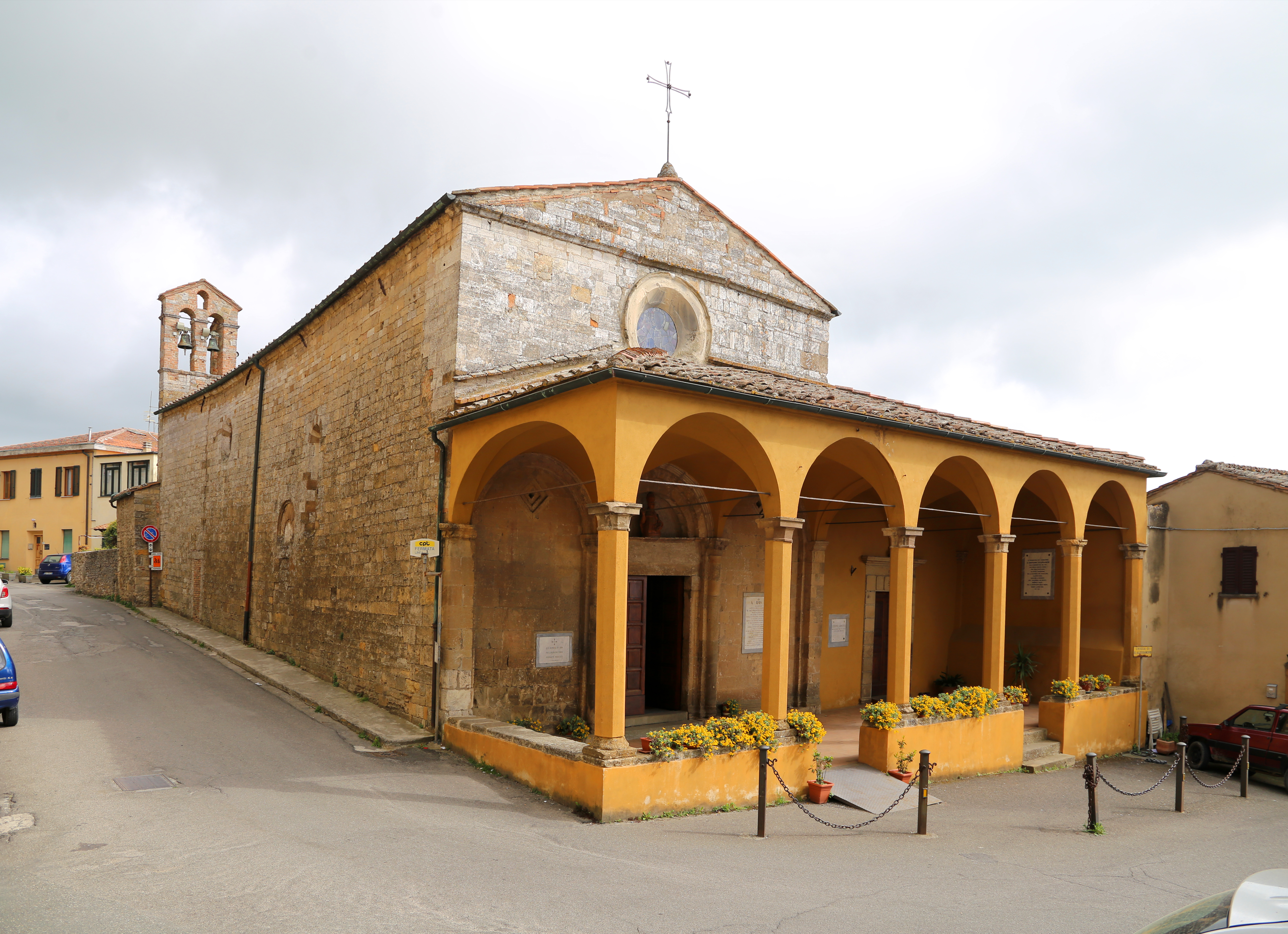

- Location within Tuscany Location within Italy

Religion
- Affiliation: Roman Catholic
- Province: Pisa

Location
- Location: Volterra, Italy
- Coordinates: 43.3994°N 10.8592°E

Architecture
- Type: Church
- Style: Romanesque architecture
- Groundbreaking: 1120

Sant'Alessandro is a Romanesque-style Roman Catholic parish church located on Borgo Sant'Alessandro at the corner with Viale Cesare Battisti in Volterra, province of Pisa, region of Tuscany, Italy. It is located outside the Porta d'Arco (Portal of the Arch), one of the seven gates in the walls of Volterra.

== History and description ==
A church was initially consecrated here in 1120 by Pope Callixtus II, presumably at the site of a pagan temple. The structure is made from stone blocks and has a wooden beams sustaining the ceiling. In the facade is an oculus, and an awkward portico was added in the 16th-century. The sail-type bell tower above the apse was added in 1598

Inside a painted cross, poorly conserved, dating to the 12th century is kept in the church; it putatively derives from the Monastery of San Galgano in Chiusdino. Two tablets depicting Saints Atinia and Greciniana are two of the few remaining parts of the altar made by Cosimo Daddi. A 15th-century-tabernacle is located on the right wall of the presbytery, originating from the Santi Pietro e Paolo church in Coiano, in the municipality of Castelfiorentino, Valdelsa, but is part of Volterra's diocese.
