= Emilio Fiaschi =

Italian sculptor (1858–1941)

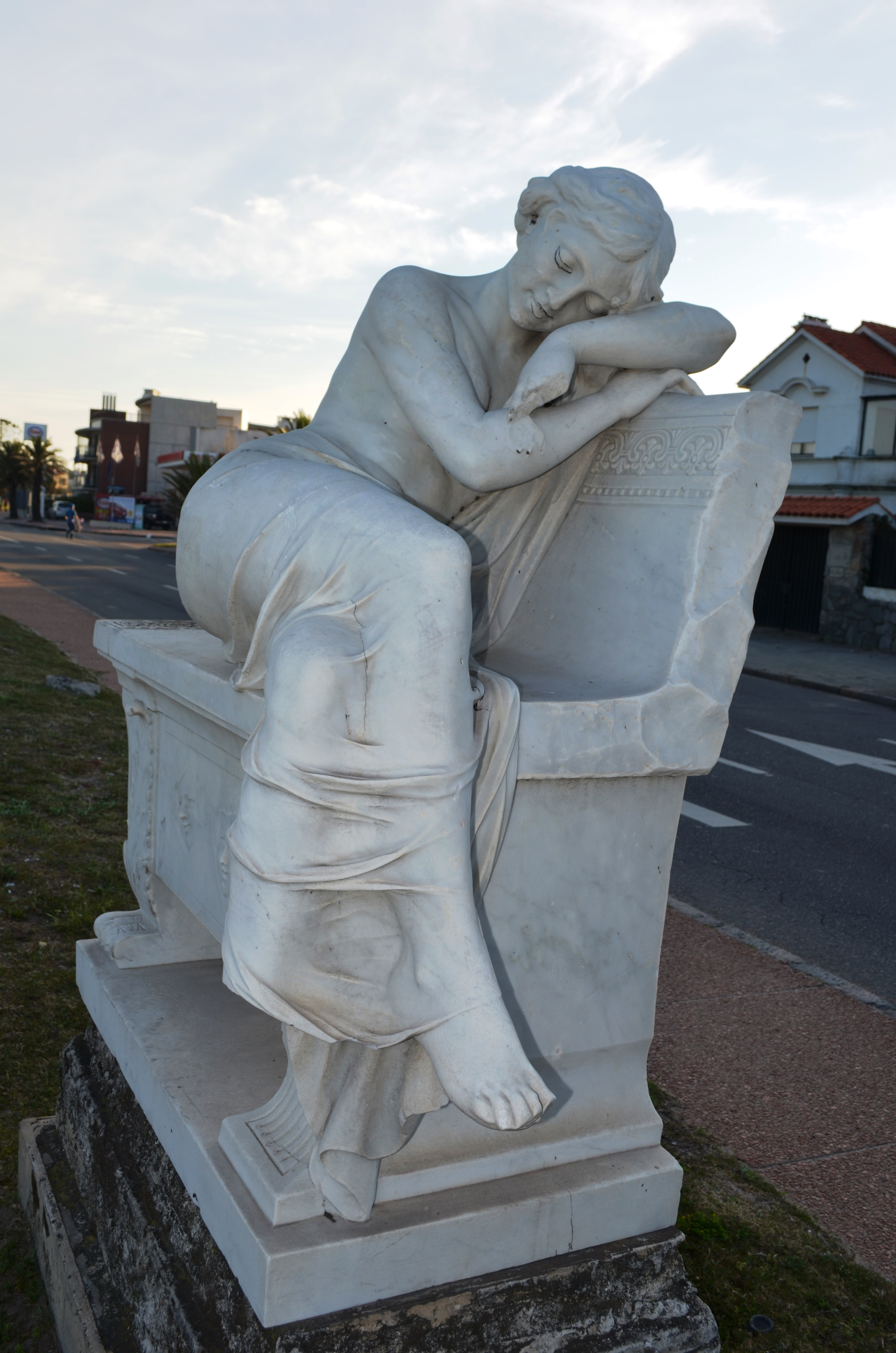
The Sleep, marble sculpture in the Rambla of Carrasco, Montevideo.

P. Emilio Fiaschi (1858 – 1941), also called Emiliano Fiaschi, was an Italian sculptor. He was born in Volterra and died in Florence, Italy. From 1883 to 1885, he studied at Accademia di Belle Arti di Firenze and spent most of his career in Florence, Italy. He was skilled in sculpting both marble and alabaster and most often produced female nudes, usually smaller than life-size figures. His female nudes featured highly polished skin and emphasized the curves of hips and waistlines.

A partial list of his works include Le Printemps (marble on black marble pedestal, c.1900-1910) which sold for $25,000 at Christie's in New York on April 13, 2017, Beatrice (marble), Courting Boy and Girl (white marble), Female nude partially draped (marble), A Good Book (marble), Reclining Beauty and Admirer (alabaster), Seated Maiden (Carved alabaster and marble), Standing Semi-Nude (marble), A Young Girl (alabaster), The Sleep (marble, in Montevideo) and various bustes of the nimph Daphne. He died in 1941.

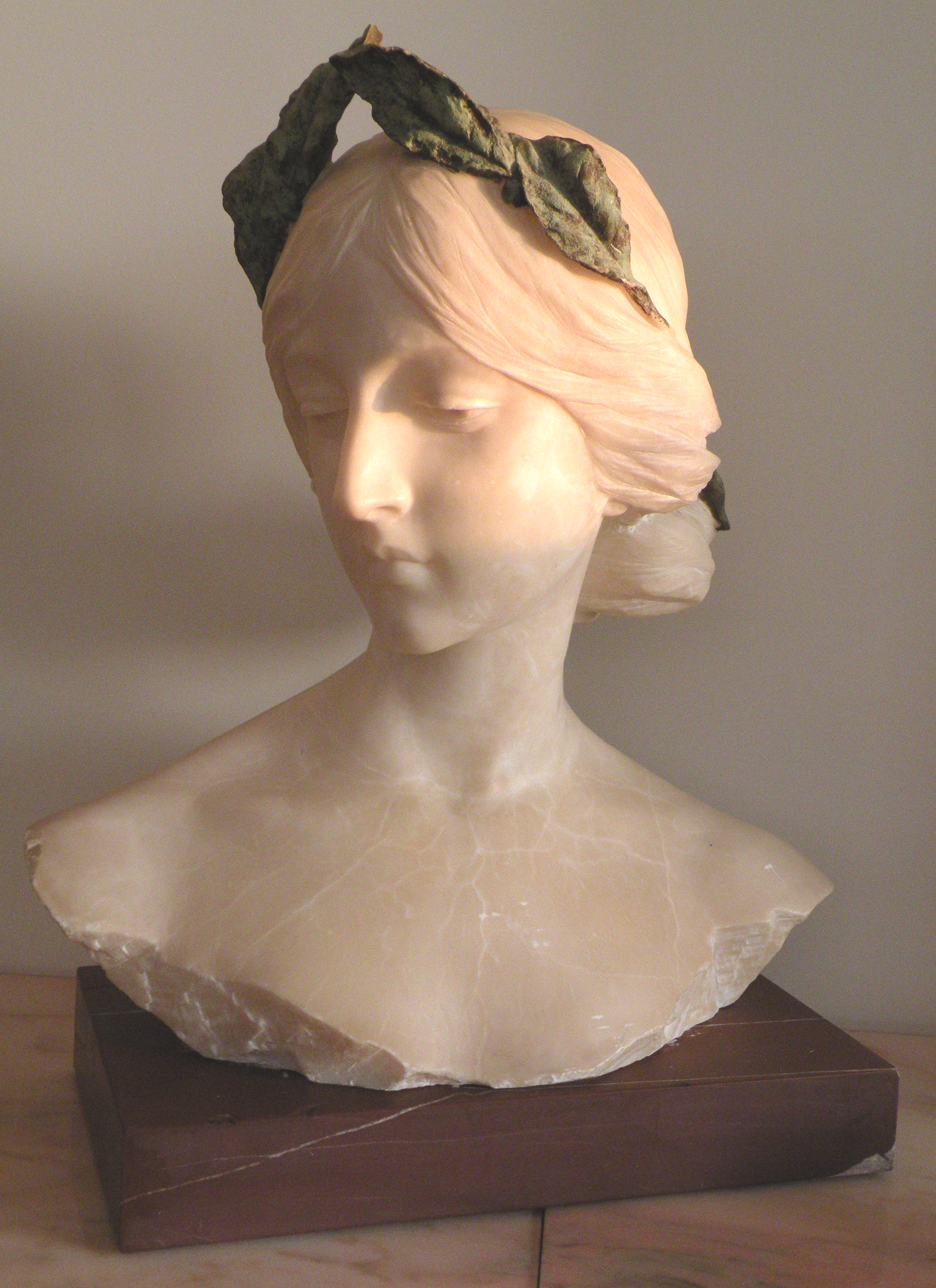
Alabaster buste of Daphne wearing a laurel wreath, sculpted by Emilio Fiaschi
