= Villamagna, Volterra =

Villamagna
- Frazione
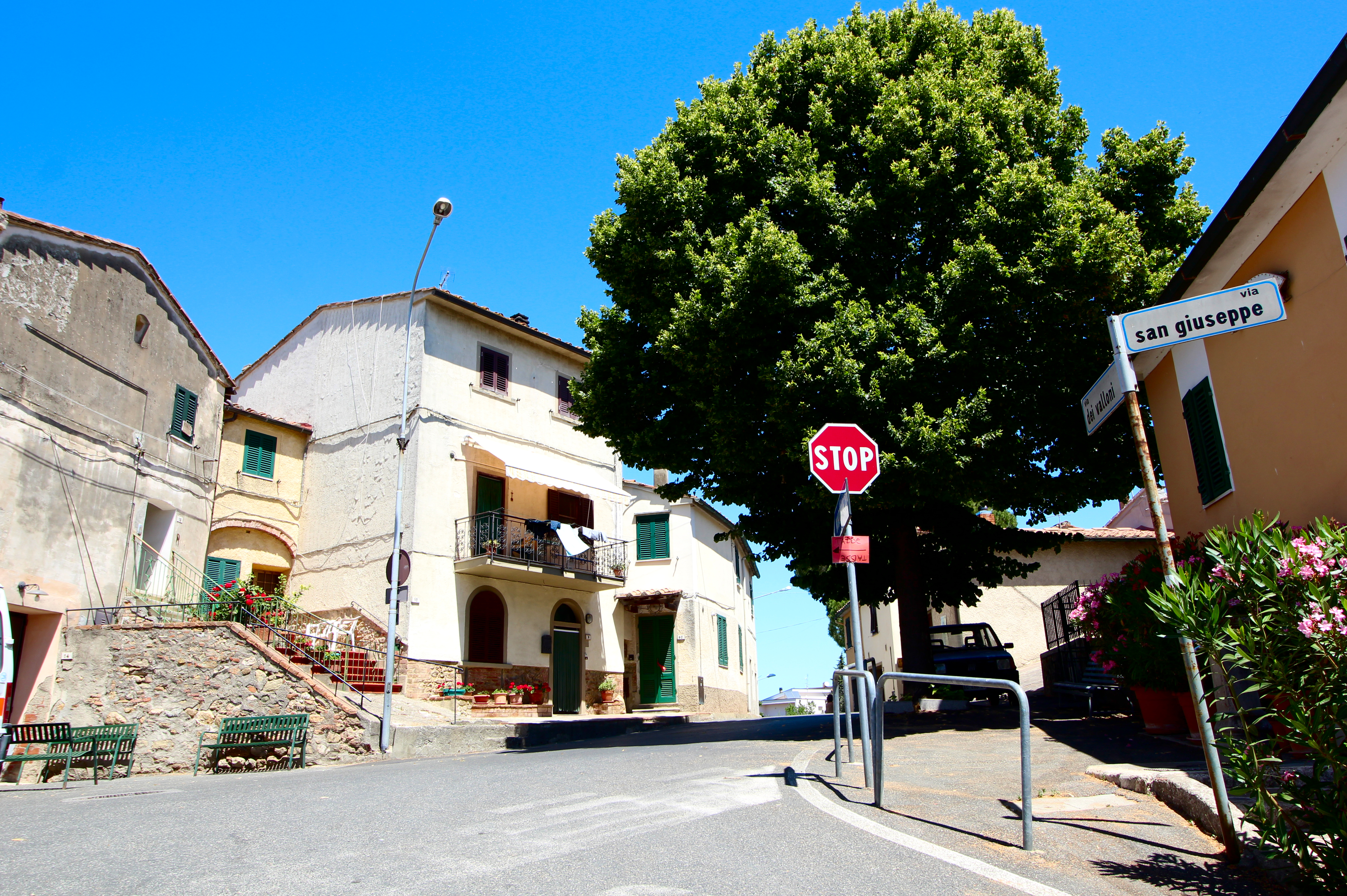

- Location of Villamagna in Italy
- Coordinates: 43°28′54″N 10°50′19″E
- Country: Italy
- Region: Tuscany
- Province: Pisa (PI)
- Comune: Volterra
- Elevation: 258 m (846 ft)

Population (2011)
  - Total: 228
- Demonym: Villamagnesi
- Time zone: UTC+1 (CET)
  - Summer (DST): UTC+2 (CEST)
- Postal code: 56048
- Dialing code: (+39) 0588

Villamagna is a village in Tuscany, central Italy, administratively a frazione of the comune of Volterra, province of Pisa. At the time of the 2001 census its population was 220.

Villamagna is about 60 km from Pisa and 15 km from Volterra.

Churches in Villamagna

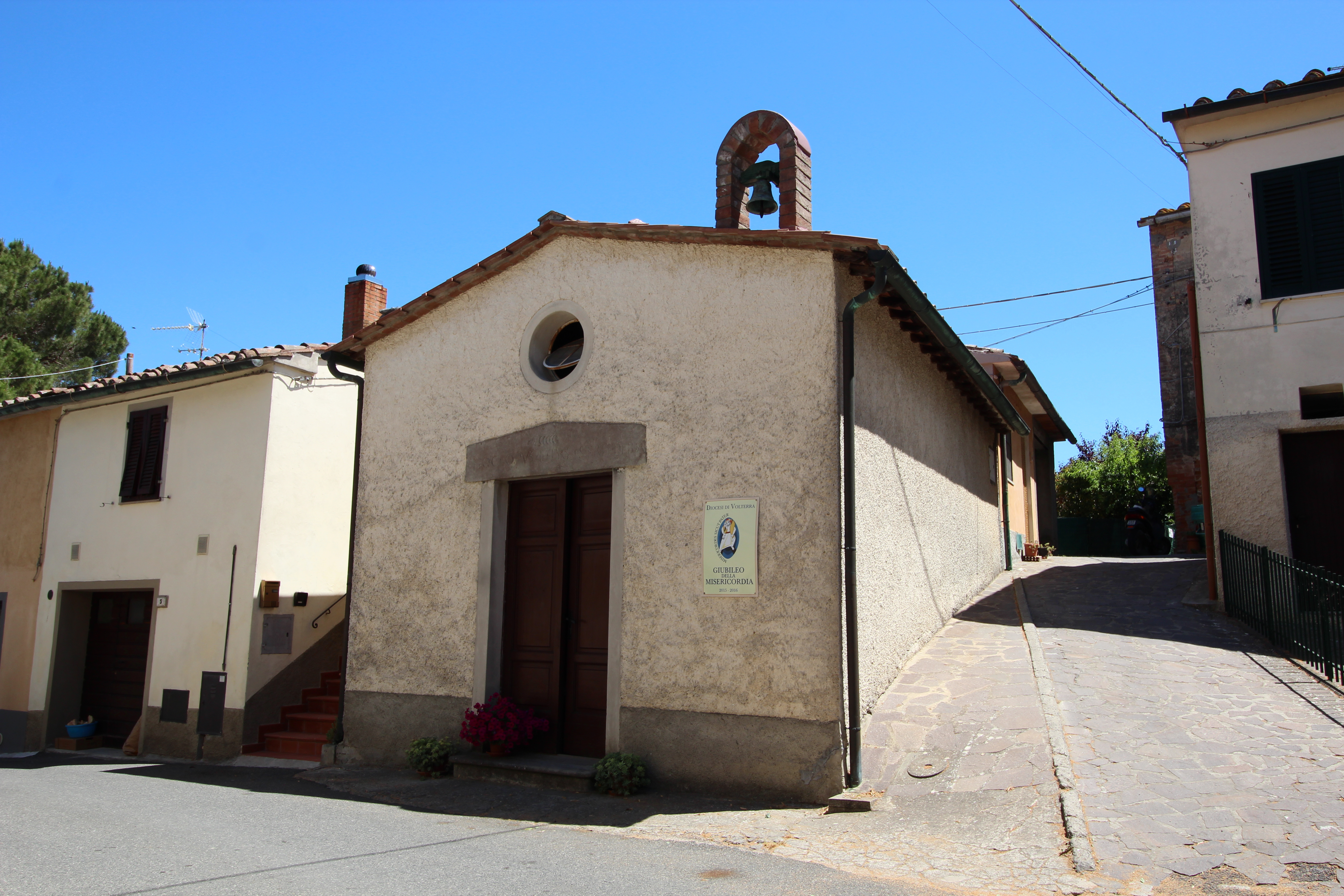
Sant’Antonio Abate

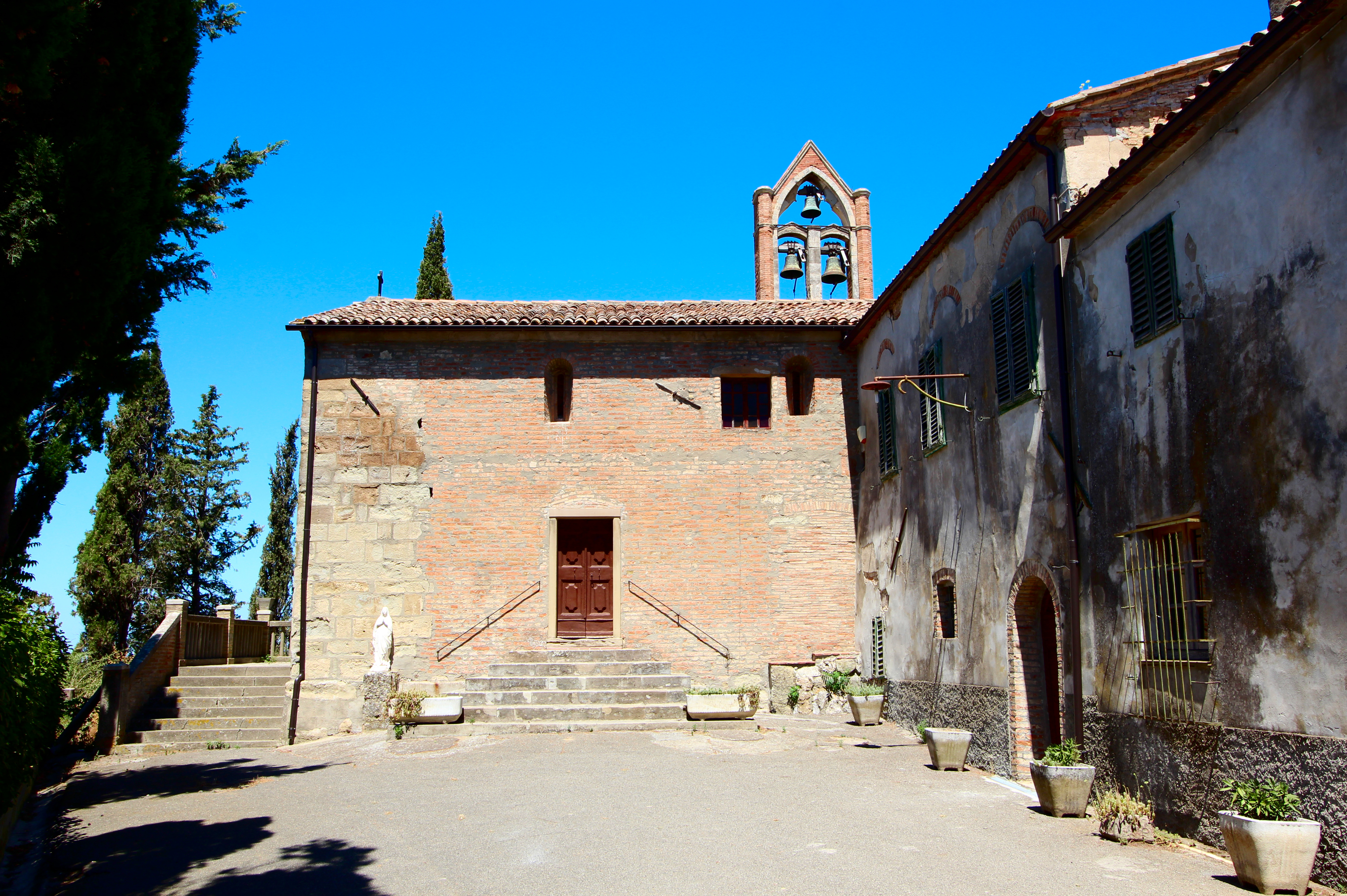
Santi Giovanni Battista e Felicita

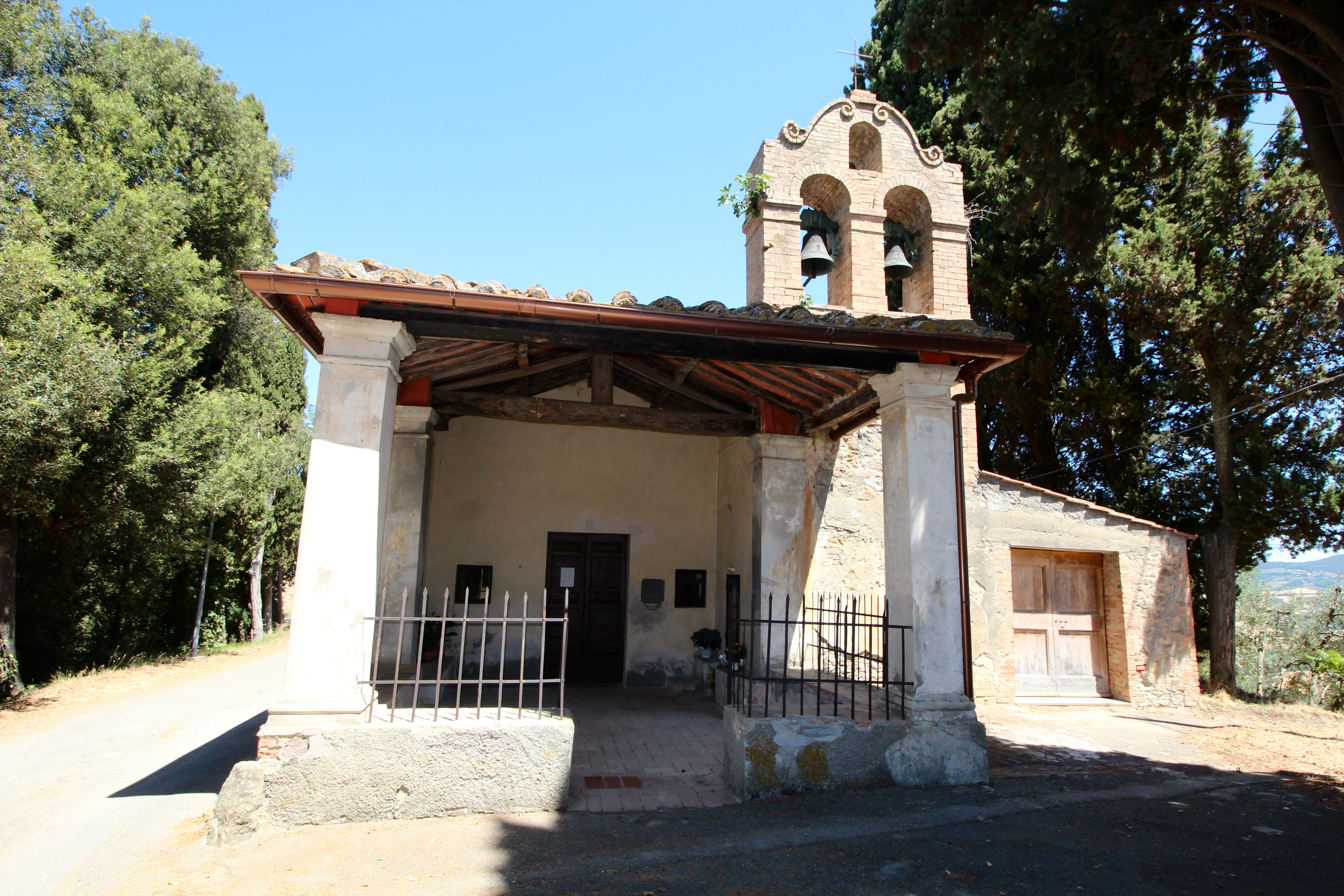
Madonna della Neve
