= Giuseppe Bessi =

Italian sculptor

- Born: 1857; Volterra, Grand Duchy of Tuscany
- Died: 1922 (aged 64–65); Volterra, Kingdom of Italy
- Known for: Sculpture

Cav. Prof. Giuseppe Bessi (5 April 1857 – 5 December 1922) was an Italian sculptor.

== Biography ==
Bessi attended the School of Art in his native city, Volterra, directed by Paride Bagnolesi, under whom Bessi studied. Subsequently, he continued his study at the Academy of Fine Arts in Florence, where his professors included the sculptor Augusto Rivalta, before returning to Volterra in 1872. There, in 1879 he established a workshop and began to specialize in statues and busts of alabaster, marble, and onyx, although he also worked in bronze. He is considered one of the most important representatives of Italian salon sculpture. His works combine the forms of neoclassicism and Art Nouveau.

Bessi served as director of the School of Art in Volterra (1891-1910), where he taught until his death. This institution is considered the only academy in the world for the art of working alabaster; near Volterra there are alabaster deposits which have been quarried since the sixth century.

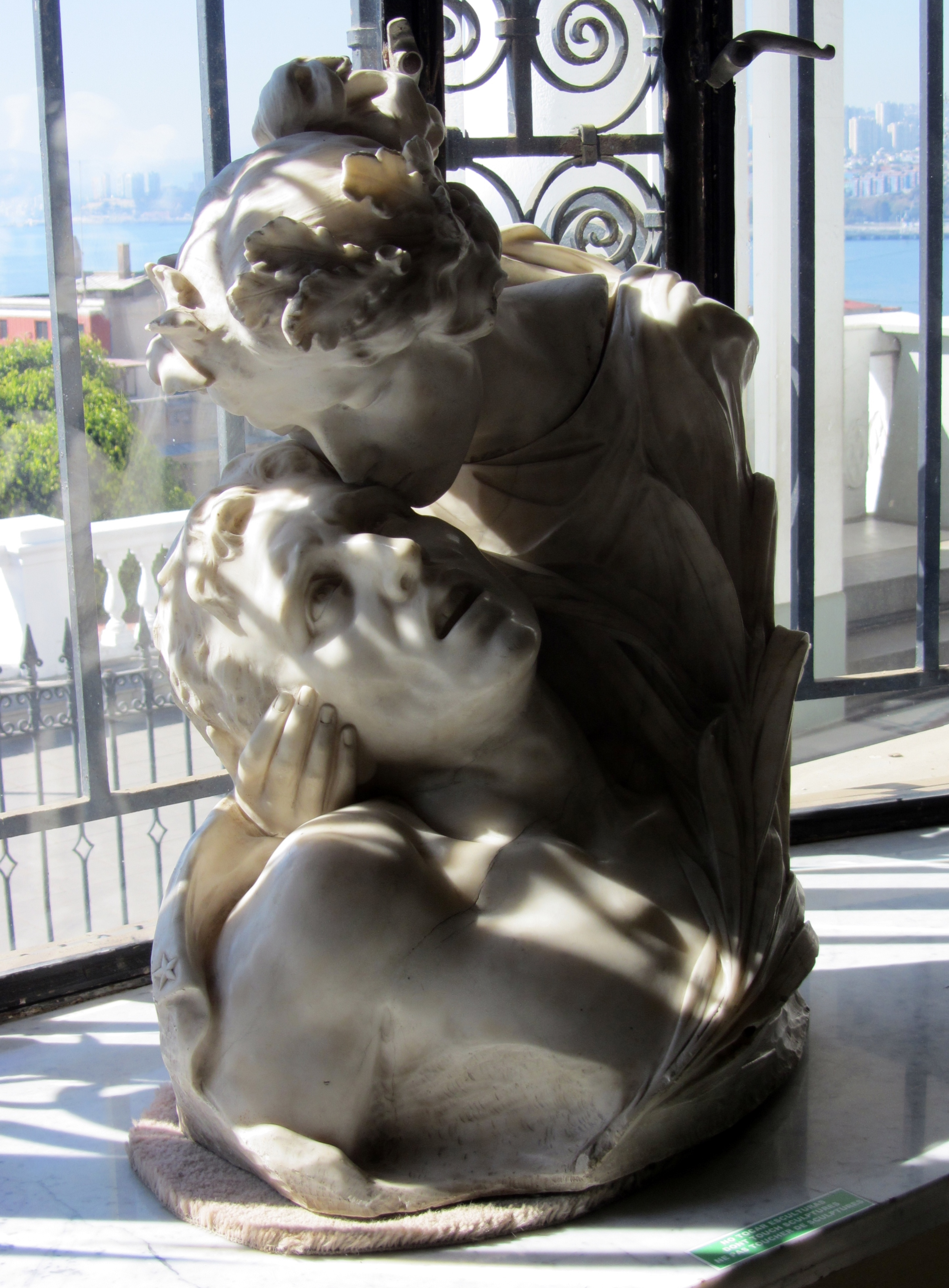
The Kiss of Glory, Municipal Museum of Fine Arts, Valparaiso, Chile

Bessi's works in alabaster were exhibited at important expositions, including the Universal Exposition in Paris in 1900, the International Exposition of Modern Decorative Art held in Turin en 1902, and the Louisiana Purchase Exposition (Saint Louis World's Fair) of 1904. Bessi received awards on various occasions, and his works were very successful on the international art market. As a result, replicas were often made; these copies from his workshop bear the signature "Studio Prof. G. Bessi." One of his masterpieces, Nuvoloni, was awarded a gold medal at the Turin Biennale in 1912. The work depicts a powerful, nervous blacksmith with his arms crossed, his hammer resting between his anvil and his apron. These are the clouds of the great social problems that are coming after the proud yet foolish end of the century. A sculpture that reflects Bessi's socialist spirit.

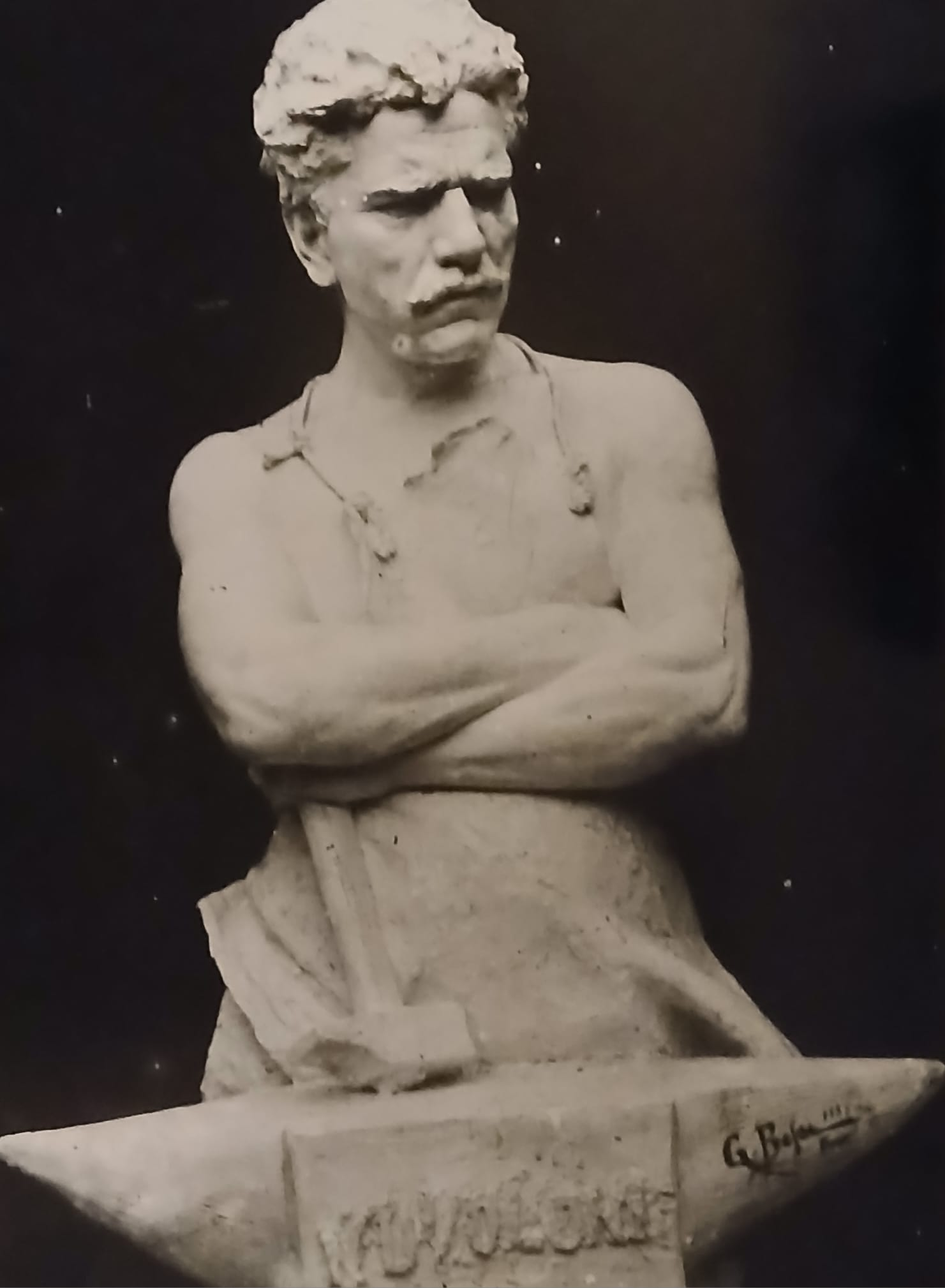

An artist and businessman, Bessi's friendship with Francesco Gioli brought him into contact with the Macchiaioli and the proponents of the Scapigliatura movement, as well as with the works of his contemporary Medardo Rosso, evolving into a blend of impressionism and the Italian Art Nouveau style called Liberty, with a baroque influence.

Works by Bessi are in the Hermitage Museum in St. Petersburg along with other museums such as the Ecomuseo dell'Alabastro in his native city. In Spain, the González Martí National Museum of Ceramics and Decorative Arts in Valencia holds a bust by Bessi titled Alba di Pace (Dawn of Peace) and in Chile the Museo Municipal de Bellas Artes de Valparaíso has a sculptural composition The Kiss of Glory. Numerous works by Bessi are in private collections in the United States and have been shown in exhibitions in that country. After his death, Giuseppe Bessi's workshop passed to his children (Mino followed his father's path, which Giusto sought his fortune abroad, still with alabaster), and later to his grandson Ghebo Vero and his great-grandson Pedro. The latter converted the workshop into a gallery shop selling typical artisanal products of Volterra; Alabastri G. Bessi continued in business uninterrupted until 2015. Now the sculptural activity is continued in the Bessi Studio in Volterra by Pedro, who is responsible for replicating the models of Giuseppe, Mino and numerous Volterra sculptors who were students of his great-grandfather in the Volterra art school. During his lifetime, Bessi was distinguished by the Italian government with the Order of Merit For Labor. A street in the city of Scandicci, near Florence, now bears Bessi's name.
