= Roman Theatre at Volterra =

Ancient Roman theater in Volterra, Italy

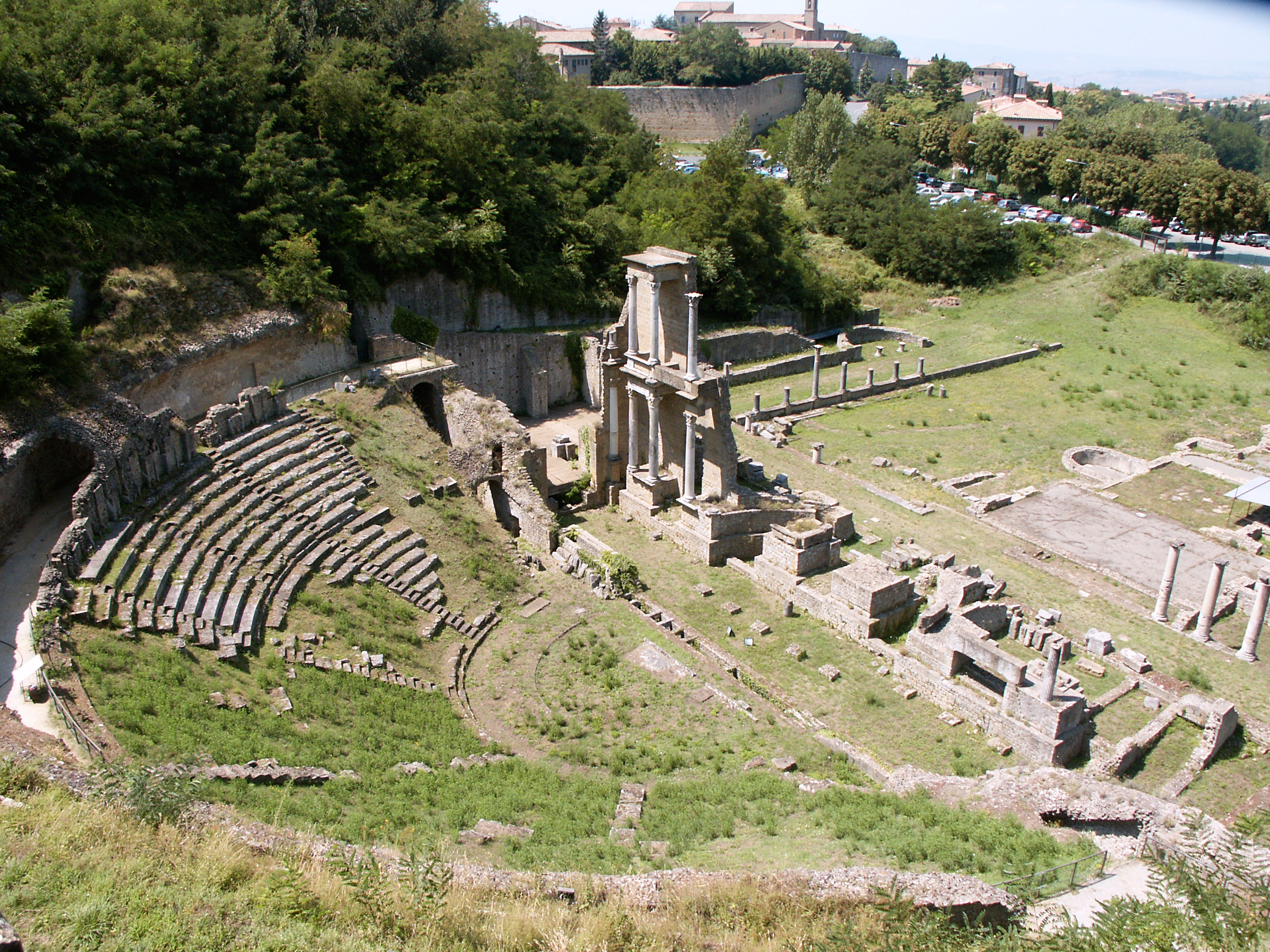
The Roman Theatre of Volterra

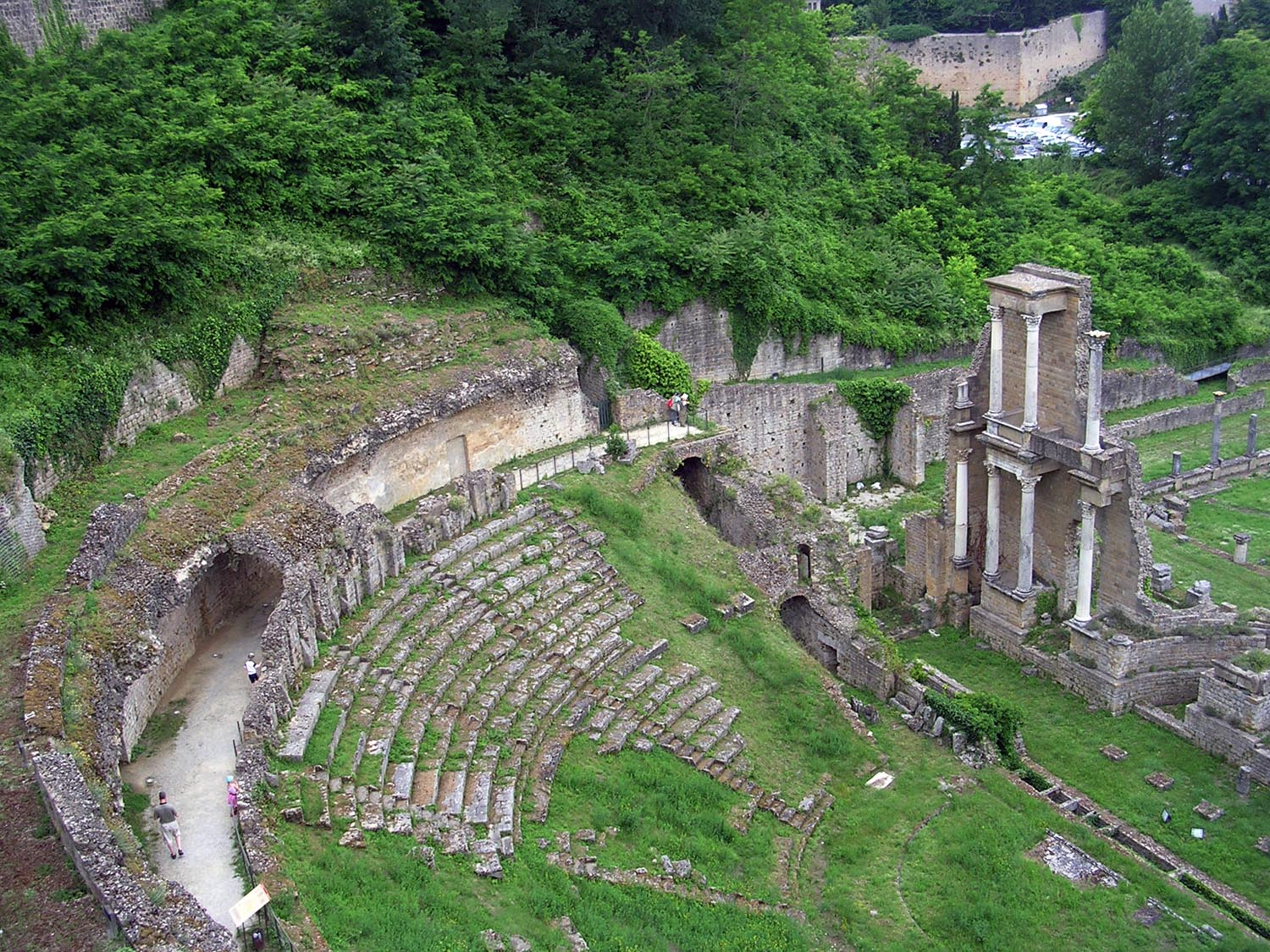
The left half of the scena (modern reconstruction), showing the elaborate two-story design. The curve of part of the central niche is at right.

The Roman theatre of Volterra was uncovered in the 1950s, during archaeological excavations of the ancient Roman city conducted by Enrico Fiumi. 19th-century guide to the city mentions efforts in 1817 by the commune to start excavating what was considered a luxurious amphitheater at this site. It is one of the best-preserved Roman theatres in Italy. It is located just outside the Porta Fiorentina, in an area called Vallebuona.

== Construction ==
The theatre was built in the Augustan period at the end of the first century BC, financed by members of the wealthy Caecina family of Volterra. The dedicatory epigraph of the theater (now in the Guarnacci Etruscan Museum) lists Gaius Caecina Largus and the famous Aulus Caecina Severus (consul 2–1 BC) as dedicators.

The theatre was partially built into the natural slope of the hill, as Greek theatres were. At the time that it was built, there were no structures in this part of the city, only second-century BC containment works supporting the steep slope of the hill. This made it an especially suitable location for a theatre.

During Fiumi's excavations, seats (made of local limestone) were found in situ in the cavea, some engraved with the names of members of influential Volterran families, including the Caecinae, the Persii, and the Laelii. The theater had a seating capacity of 3,500.

The scaenae frons was 36 m long (122 Roman feet) and had an unusual and elaborate design (making it typical of architecture in the Augustan period, during which there was a good deal of experimentation in architectural design). At the centre, there was an unusually large curved niche, at the back of which was the main door to the rooms in the back of the scena. The scena was two stories tall, with Corinthian columns over five meters high on both levels, with an overall height of nearly 16 m, which was unusually tall. The scena was decorated with statues of the emperor Augustus and the empress Livia. The heads from three of these statues were found in the excavation and are now in the Guarnacci Etruscan Museum. The part of the two-story scena that is standing today at the site was reconstructed in the late 1970s from parts of the structure found in situ.

The orchestra in front of the scena was paved in coloured marble.

The theatre was equipped with a velarium, a kind of awning that could be drawn over the cavea to provide shade for the audience. Poles set into corbels around the cavea supported the velarium. Some of these corbels (each with a hole where the pole would be set) are well preserved in the Volterra theatre.

== The baths ==
The theatre fell into disuse at the end of the third century. In the flat area behind the scena, a public bath was built during the third to fourth centuries.

== Excavation ==
In 1941, work began in the Vallebuona area to create a sports field, during which some Roman remains were unearthed. At the time, the Superintendency of Antiquities of Etruria did not have funds available for an excavation. In 1950, a plan was formed to excavate the area, with Enrico Fiumi in charge of the project. Fiumi was not an archaeologist by profession, but an economist who worked at the Psychiatric Hospital of Volterra. He was passionate about archaeology and local history, and in the late 1940s, he had been appointed honorary inspector of antiquities and fine arts in the city, as well as director of the Guarnacci Etruscan Museum.

The director of the psychiatric hospital arranged for six patients and two assistant nurses to work with Fiumi at the dig. Later, six more patients were added to the team. The hospital had employed patients in work projects before, as a type of therapy—called ergoterapia, "ergotherapy"—to help patients recover. The Guarnacci Etruscan Museum provided insurance for the workers and paid them a modest salary for their work.

In October 1952, Fiumi put up a plaque honouring the psychiatric hospital patients who helped in the work; in October 1993, the city put up an adjacent plaque honoring Fiumi (who had died in 1976).

== International Festival at the Roman Theatre ==
A festival is held in the ancient theater each summer, founded and directed by the actor and director Simone Migliorini.

== See also ==
- List of Roman theatres

== Bibliography ==
- Fiumi, E. "Lat partecipazione dei ricoverati dell'ospedale psichiatrico agli scavi del teatro romano (1950–53)." Volterra 10 (October 1961), 14–15.* Furiesi, Alessandro. Volterra romana. Storia, genti e civiltà. Pisa: Pacini Editore, 2008.
- Macadam, Alta. Blue Guide: Tuscany. New York: W.W. Norton, 1995.
- Sear, Frank. Roman Theatres: An Architectural Study. Oxford Monographs on Classical Archaeology. Oxford: Oxford University Press, 2006.
- Sear, Frank. Review of Il Teatro Romano di Volterra (Florence, Octavo, 1993), Journal of Roman Studies 86 (1996), pp. 217–18.
- Trovato, Silvia. Inventario dell'Archivio dell'Ospedale Psichatrico di Volterra. Volterra, Soprintendenza Archhivistica e Bibliografica della Toscana, 2018. page 10.
