= The Town of Light =

2016 video game

- Developer: LKA
- Publisher: Wired Productions
- Platforms: Windows, PlayStation 4, Xbox One, Nintendo Switch
- Release: PC; February 26, 2016; PS4, Xbox One; June 6, 2017; Nintendo Switch; February 7, 2020
- Genre: Adventure
- Mode: Single-player

The Town of Light is a psychological horror adventure game developed by LKA and published by Wired Productions. It was released for PC on February 26, 2016, PlayStation 4 and Xbox One on June 6, 2017, and Nintendo Switch on February 7, 2020.

== Plot ==
The game is set in a hospital in Tuscany, Italy called the Ospedale Psichiatrico di Volterra. The player character is a girl named Renée, who was a patient at the hospital in the 1940s. The game begins as Renée enters the now dilapidated asylum to relive her stay there. As the game progresses, it becomes known that Renée was admitted due to promiscuity, depression, and a volatile relationship with her mother. Renée found comfort in her doll, Charlotte.

Renée walks the corridors of the derelict asylum, which triggers flashbacks of both her inpatient stay and circumstances prior. It made abundantly clear that Renée was a victim of sexual abuse within the asylum, perpetrated by a male nurse or doctor. Renée discovers Amara, another patient, and a romance ensues. When the nurses discovered this relationship, they were separated.

Renée finds her old medical files, which imply that Amara did not exist and that they are figments of her imagination. After a thorough investigation in the patient property section, Renée finds Amara's possessions, thus proving her existence and that the medical team falsified some aspects of her mental illness.

A note found by Renée reads that Amara died in 1942. Medical notes found whilst searching the facility imply that Renée was verbally and physically aggressive and often spent time tied to her bed. Renée receives electroconvulsive therapy and multiple sedative injections to ease behavioural symptoms.

Renée discovers that correspondence from her mother does not reach her, and this is also discovered in the patient property section.

After several years of communication censoring by hospital staff, Renée discovers that her mother died and tried to take her own life on multiple occasions. Following this, the game's conclusion shows Renée receiving lobotomy surgery. The story ends with a doctor narrating that the long term recovery for Renée post surgery is unclear.

== Reception ==
Reception

Aggregate score
Aggregator	Score
Metacritic	PC: 64/100; PS4: 67/100; XONE: 60/100

Review scores
Publication	Score
Destructoid	6.5/10
Eurogamer	Recommended
GameSpot	4/10
PC Gamer (US)	65/100
Push Square	6/10
VideoGamer.com	5/10

On Metacritic, the game has a weighted average score of 64 out of 100, based on 22 critics, indicating "mixed or average reviews".

A three-part series for PC Gamer explains how Lorenzo Conticelli designed the asylum setting for the game.

On February 1, 2018, a Nintendo Switch version was announced. This version was released on February 7, 2020.
