= Our Lady of Mercy with Saints and Angels =

Painting by Lucas Signorelli

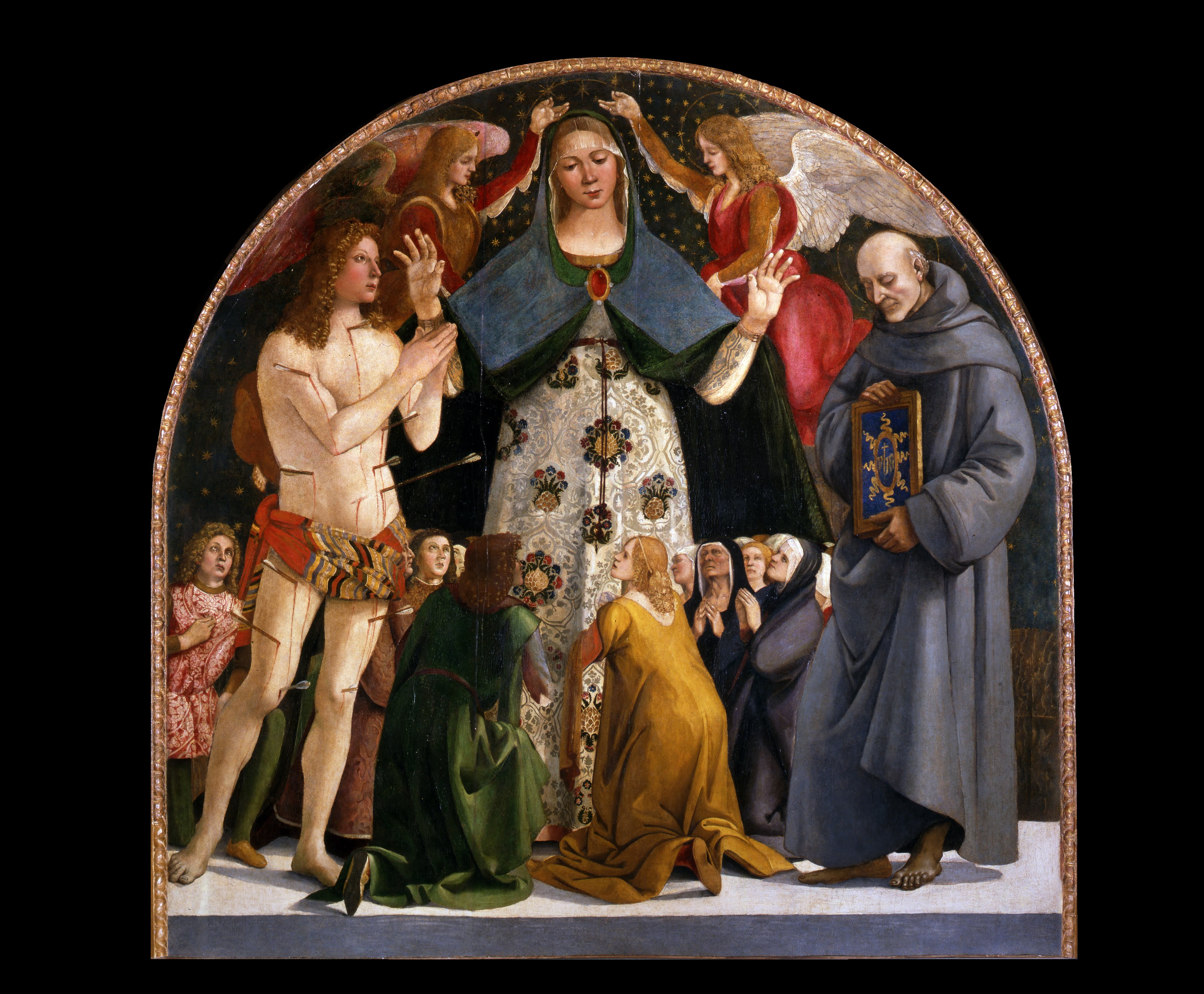
- Artist: Luca Signorelli
- Dimensions: 210 cm × 215 cm (83 in × 85 in)
- Location: Diocesan Museum, Pienza

Our Lady of Mercy with Saints and Angels is a tempera on wood painting by Luca Signorelli, created c. 1490, showing Our Lady of Mercy flanked by Saint Sebastian and Bernardino of Siena. It is now in the Diocesan Museum in Pienza.
