= Allegory of Fertility and Abundance =

Painting by Luca Signorelli

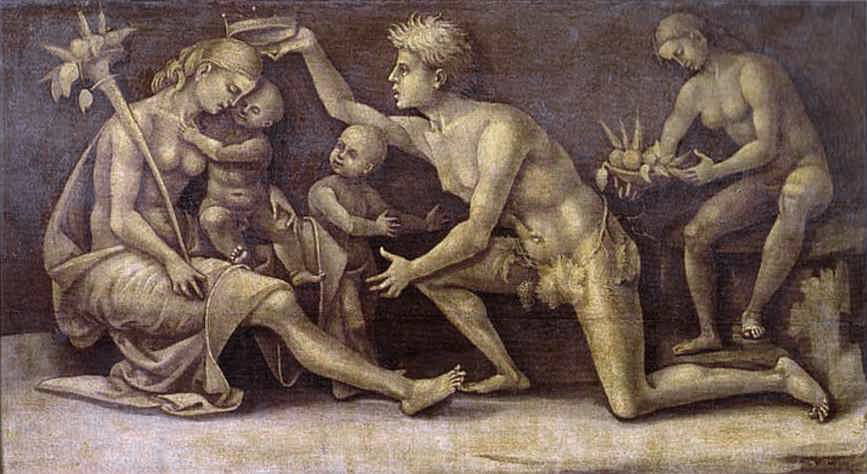
Allegory of Fertility and Abundance (c. 1500) by Luca Signorelli

Allegory of Fertility and Abundance is an allegorical painting in tempera on panel by Luca Signorelli, created c. 1500, now in the Uffizi in Florence. Produced around the same time as the artist's frescoes in the San Brizio Chapel in Orvieto, the work is a monochrome allegory inspired by classical bas-reliefs and intended for a humanist scholar's studiolo. Its figures refer to the artist's nudes in his frescoes at Orvieto and Madonna and Child with Ignudi.
