= Monaldo =

Monaldo is an Italian masculine given name. Notable people with the name include:

- Monaldo Leopardi, Italian philosopher, nobleman, politician and writer, notable as one of the main Italian intellectuals of the counter-revolution.
- Monaldo Trofi, Italian painter of the Renaissance

== See also ==
- Monaldi
