= Basilica of Santa Maria della Quercia, Viterbo =

Sanctuary church and minor basilica in Lazio, Italy

Coordinates: 42°25′46.85″N 12°7′46.02″E

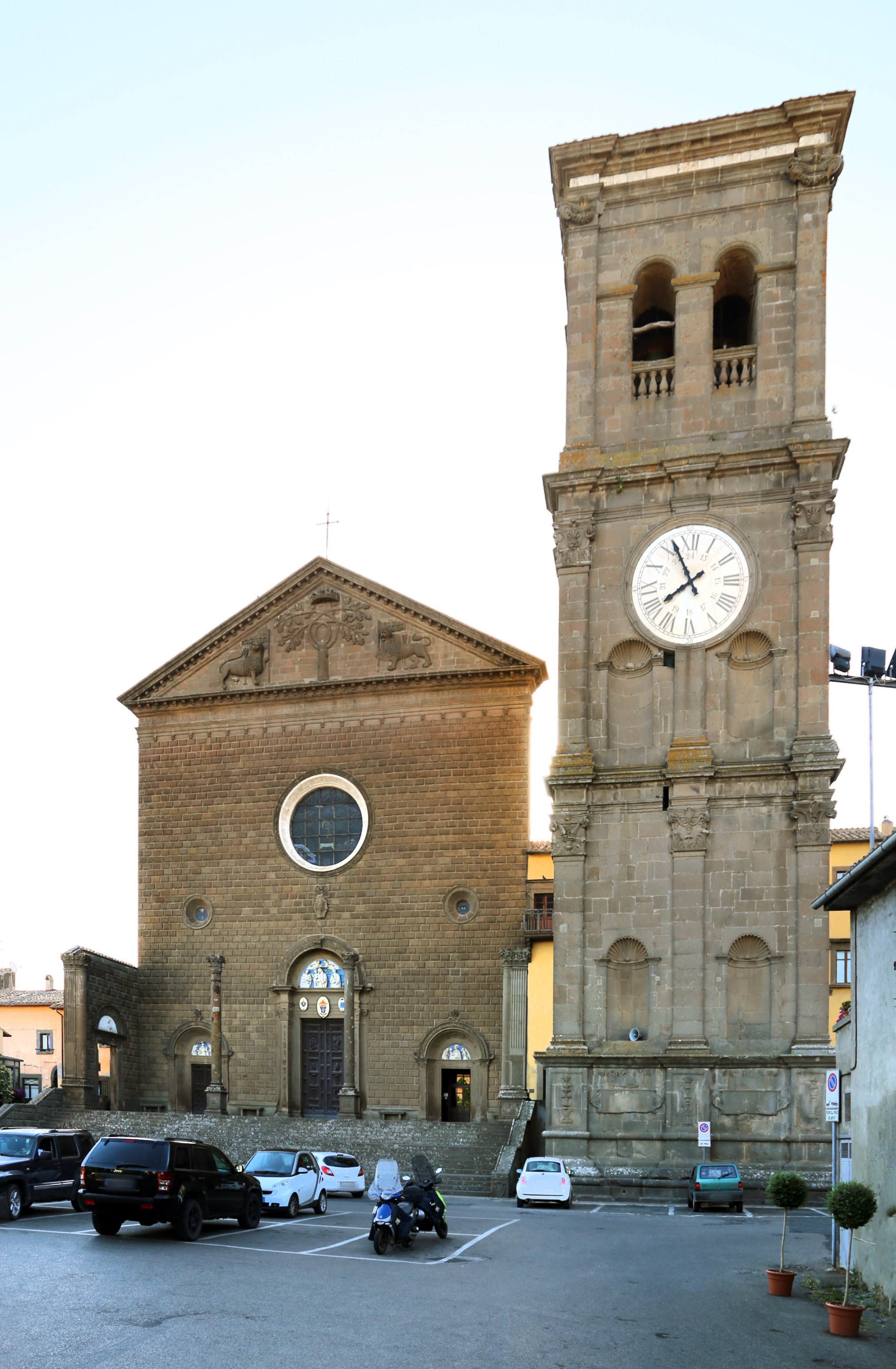
Facade and bell-tower

The Basilica of Santa Maria della Quercia is a Renaissance-style, Roman Catholic sanctuary church and minor basilica, about two kilometer outside of the center of Viterbo, on the road to Bagnaia, in the Region of Lazio, Italy.

== History ==
In 1417, a local artist painted an icon of the Virgin following the design of a local painter Maestro Martello. The image was placed on an oak tree in the countryside, and became a source of veneration, which only increased in 1467 during a scourge of the plague. Miracles were attributed to the icon, and the image was ensconced in a chapel.

An altar was erected in 1467 and a chapel commissioned by Pope Paul II. The chapel was initially affiliated with the Gesuati order, a Tuscan order which specialized in the aid to pilgrims. Within a few years, Franciscan monks substituted the priests of the Gesuati order and commissioned this larger church, built between 1470 and 1525. On the 8 of April 1578, the church was consecrated by the Cardinal Francesco de Gambara, who is buried in the church. The event was celebrated with a cycle of frescoes at the Palazzo dei Priori, Viterbo. The sanctuary acquired many patrons, including popes.

The facade is built with rustic stone. The three portal lunettes have terracotta decorations depicting the Madonna, Saints and Angels (1504–1508), completed by Andrea della Robbia. The bell tower has three orders of columns. The interior has a central nave and two aisles with a ceiling designed by Antonio da Sangallo the younger, depicting the symbols of the Madonna, Pope Paul III, and the Lion symbol of Viterbo. The Campanile, built in 1481–1505 by Ambrogio da Milano, was demolished in the 17th century.

The counter-facade has a fresco (1636) depicting the Miracle of the Priest of Canapina by Angelo Pucciati. The walls of the chapels have 17th and 18th-century frescoes detached from nearby suppressed or destroyed churches. In the presbytery is a small tempietto structure (1490) by Andrea Bregno, surrounding paintings were completed Michele Tosini, nephew of Domenico Ghirlandaio.

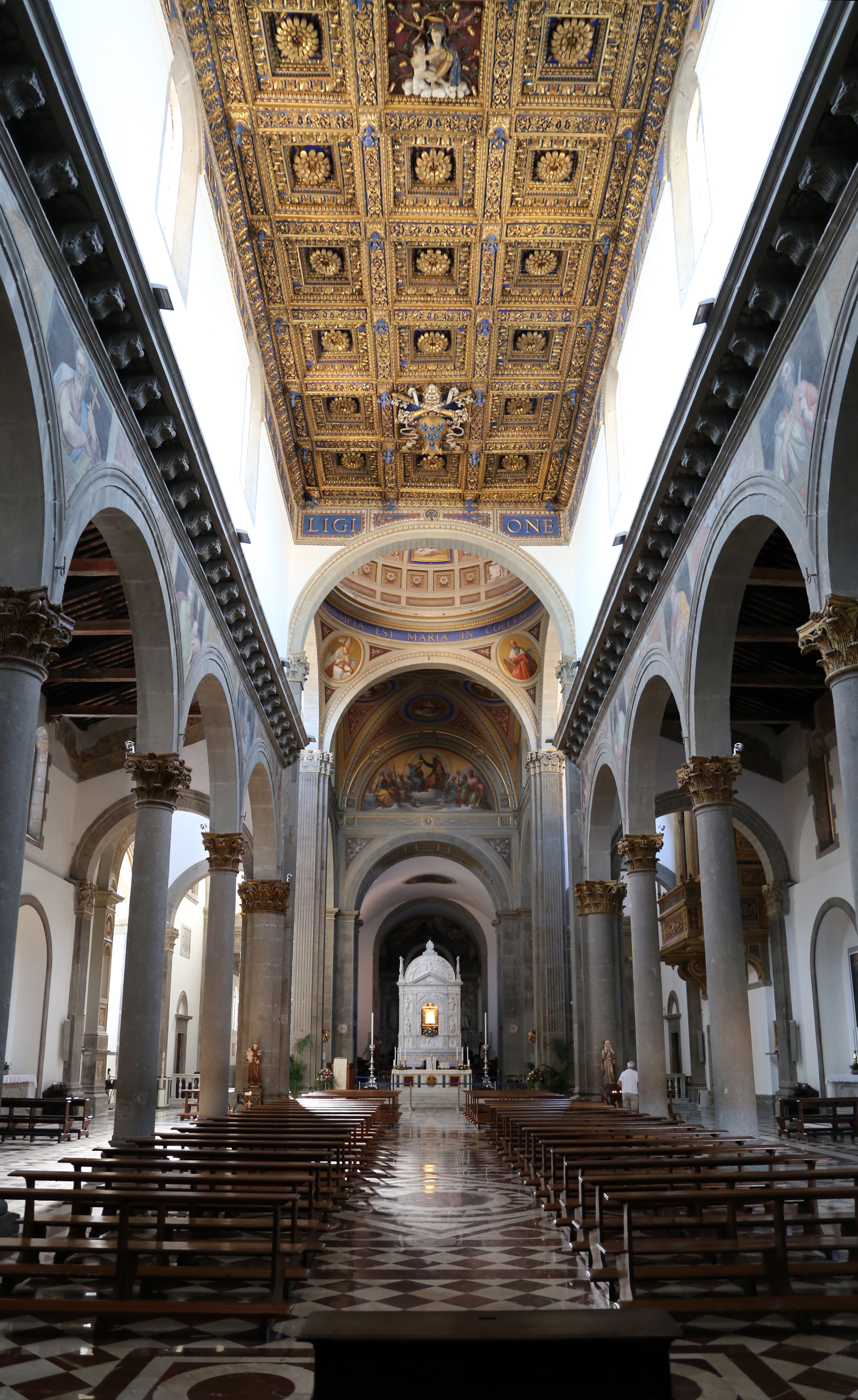
Nave

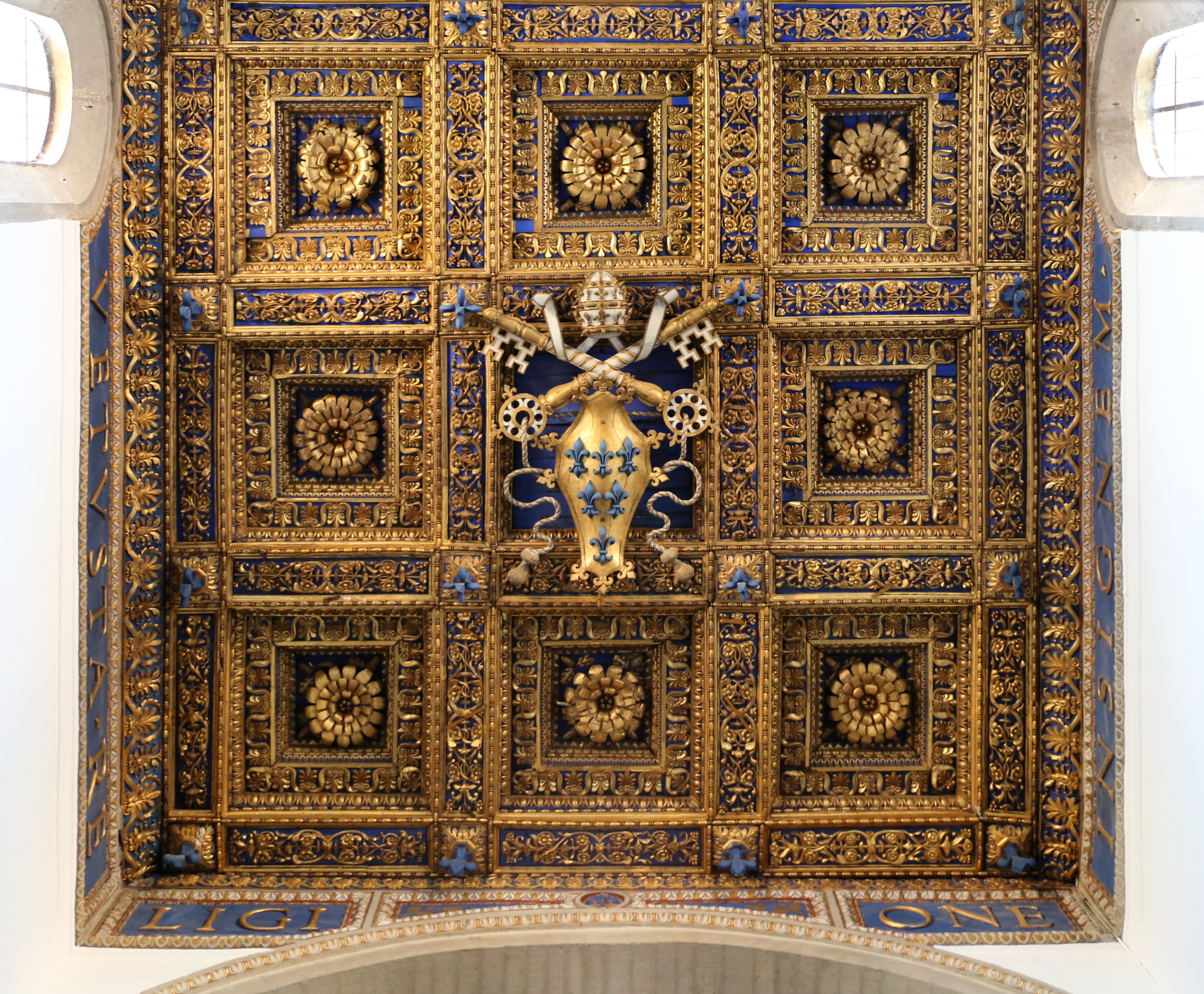
Ceiling

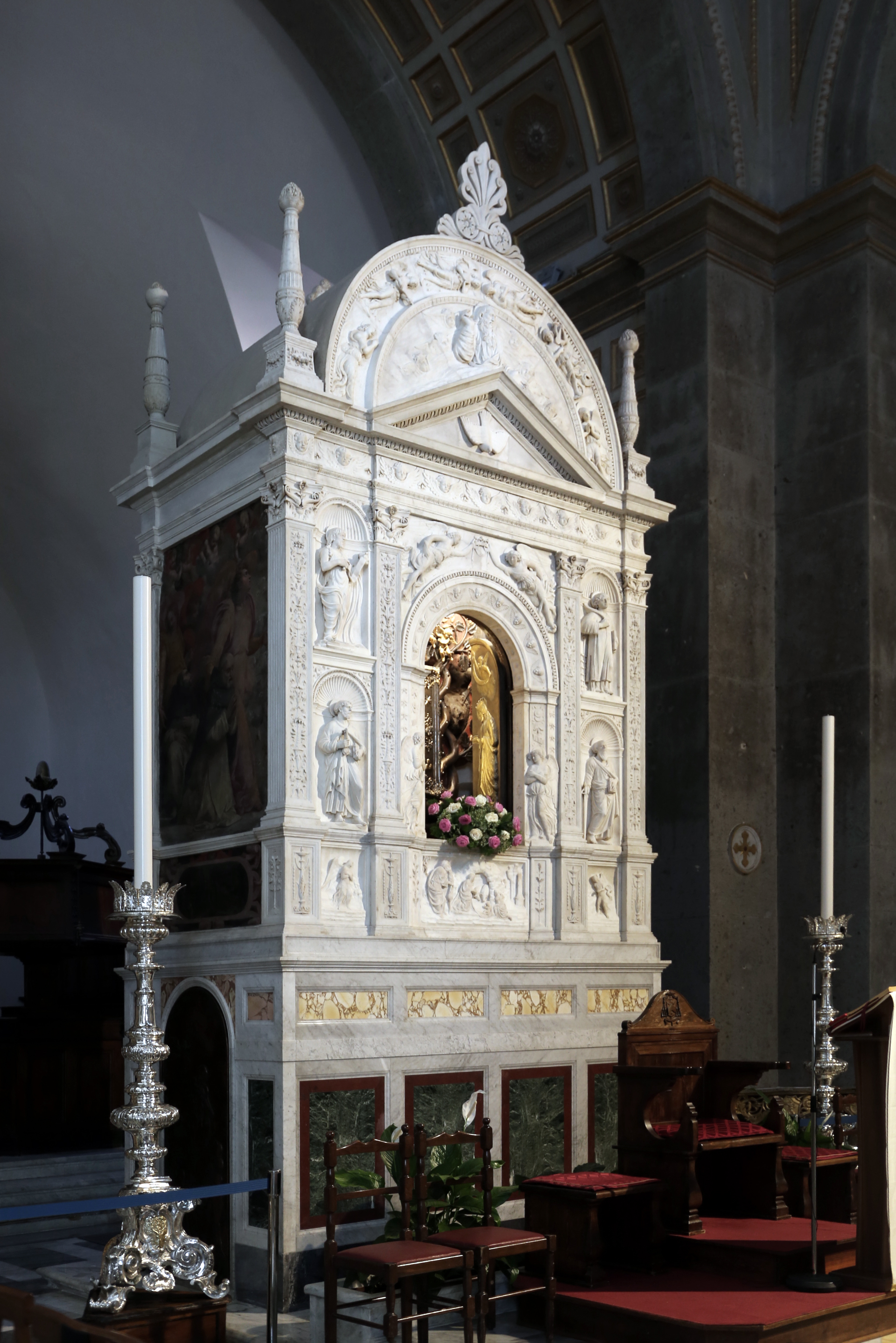
Altar tabernacle by Andrea Bregno and Michele Tosini

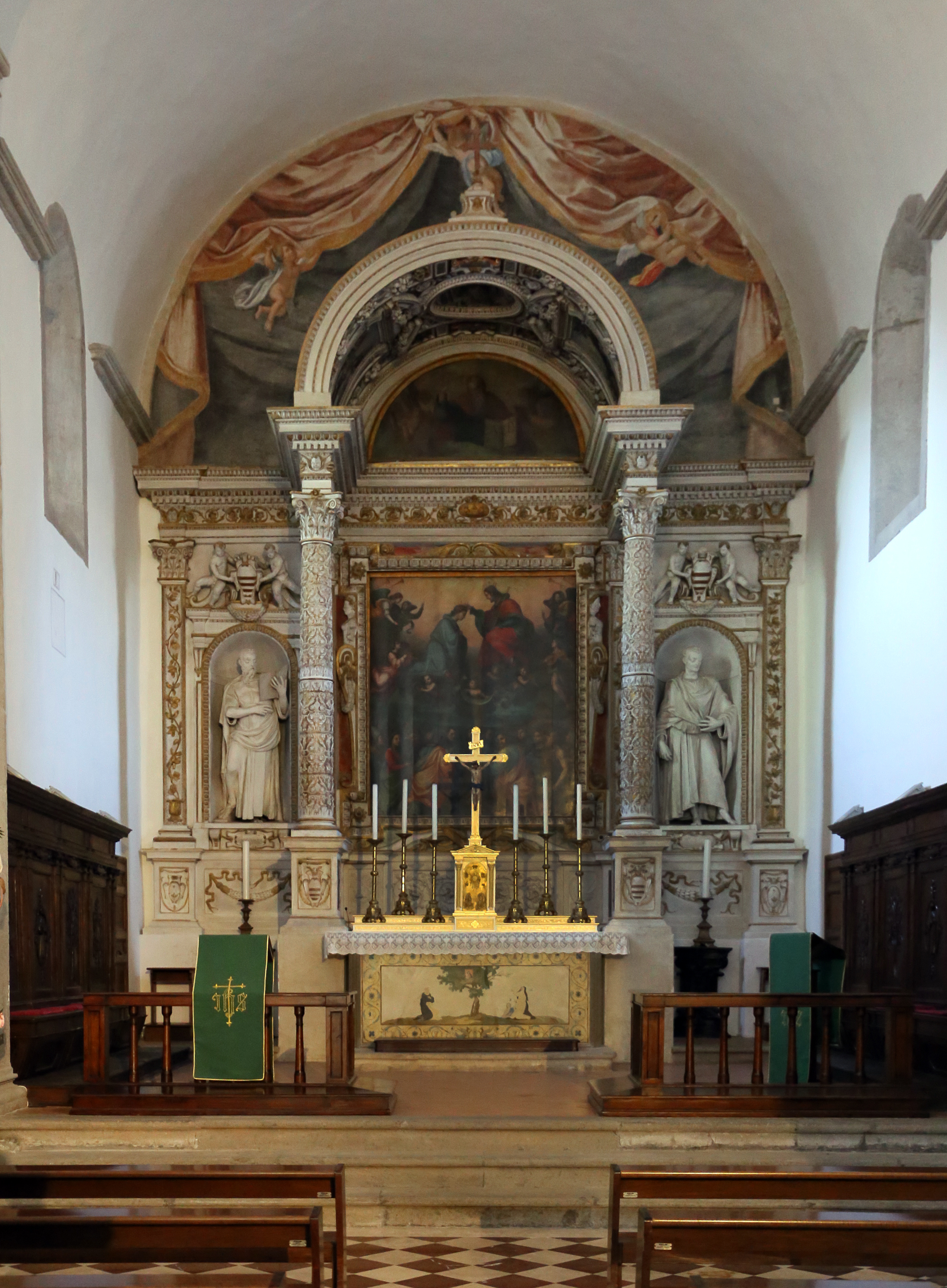
Main altar

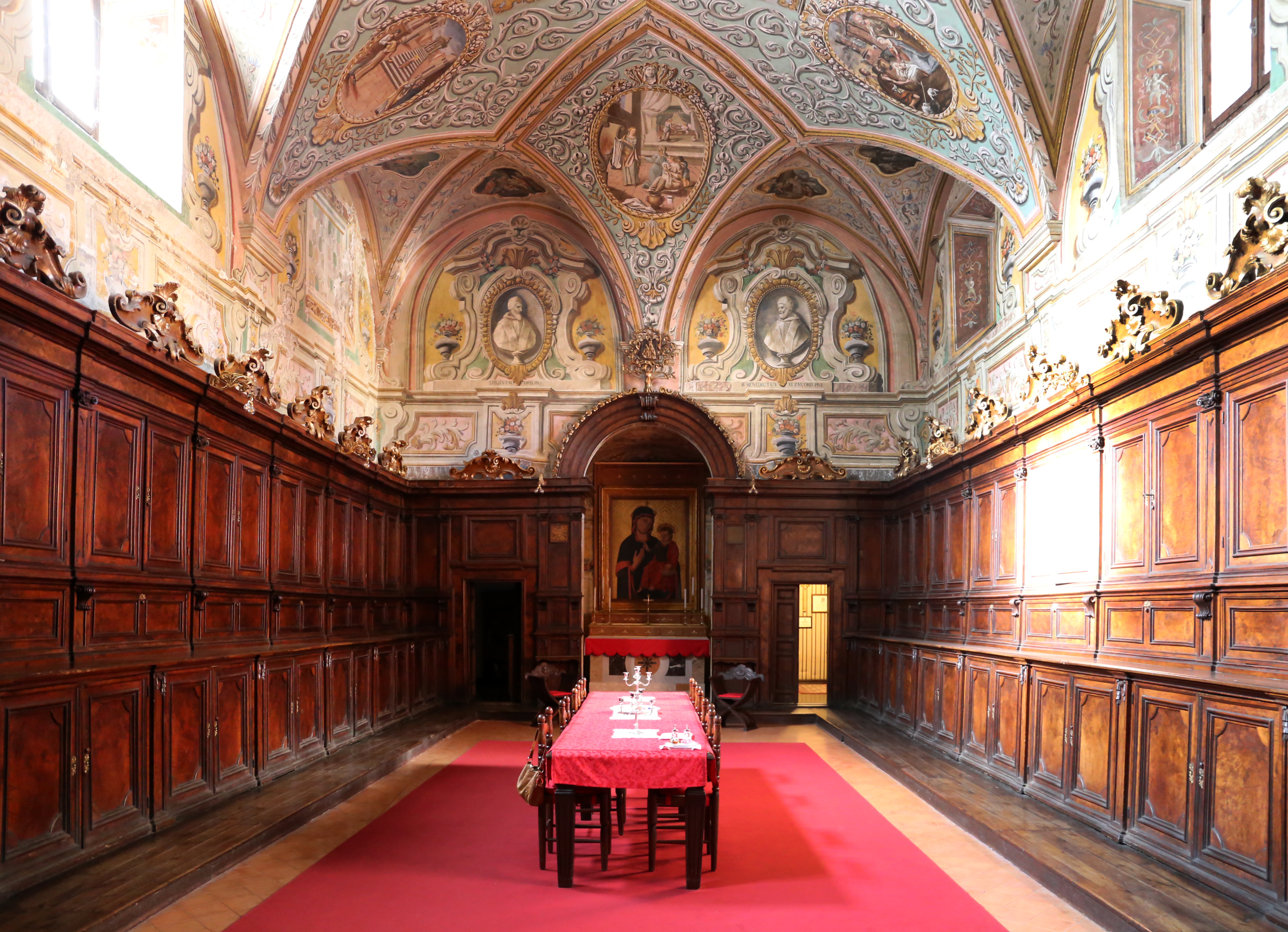
Sacristy

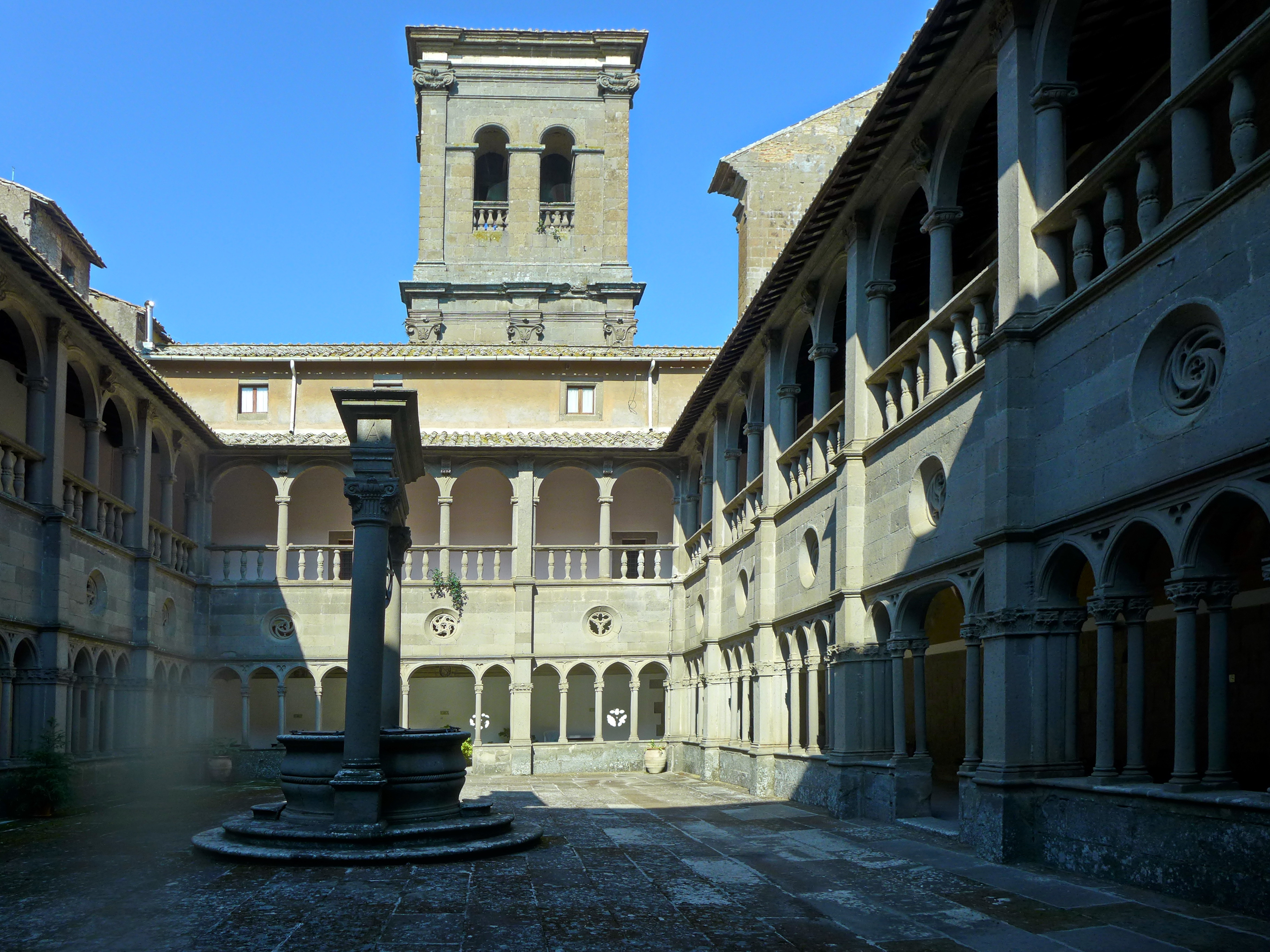
Cloister

The apse has intarsia in the wooden choir stalls, and there is a tondo in the vault displaying a Madonna della Quercia (1519) by il Truffetta. The main altarpiece in the choir depicts the Coronation of the Virgin completed by Mariotto Albertinelli.

Left of the nave is a small room with ex-votos, including silver plaques and paintings from the 15th through 18th centuries depicting miracles attributed to the Madonna della Quercia. It also contains a 15th-century bust of Christ by Matteo Cividale, precious coral decorations from the 16th century.

The convent of Santa Maria della Quercia has two cloisters: one built in 1550–1663; the other choir, known as il Grande o della Fontana, has a Renaissance layout with 17th-century frescoed lunettes depicting the Miracles of the Madonna.

The church was elevated to the rank of minor basilica in 1867 by pope Pius IX.
