= Madonna and Child with Saints (Signorelli, Arezzo) =

Painting by Luca Signorelli

Madonna with Child and Saints
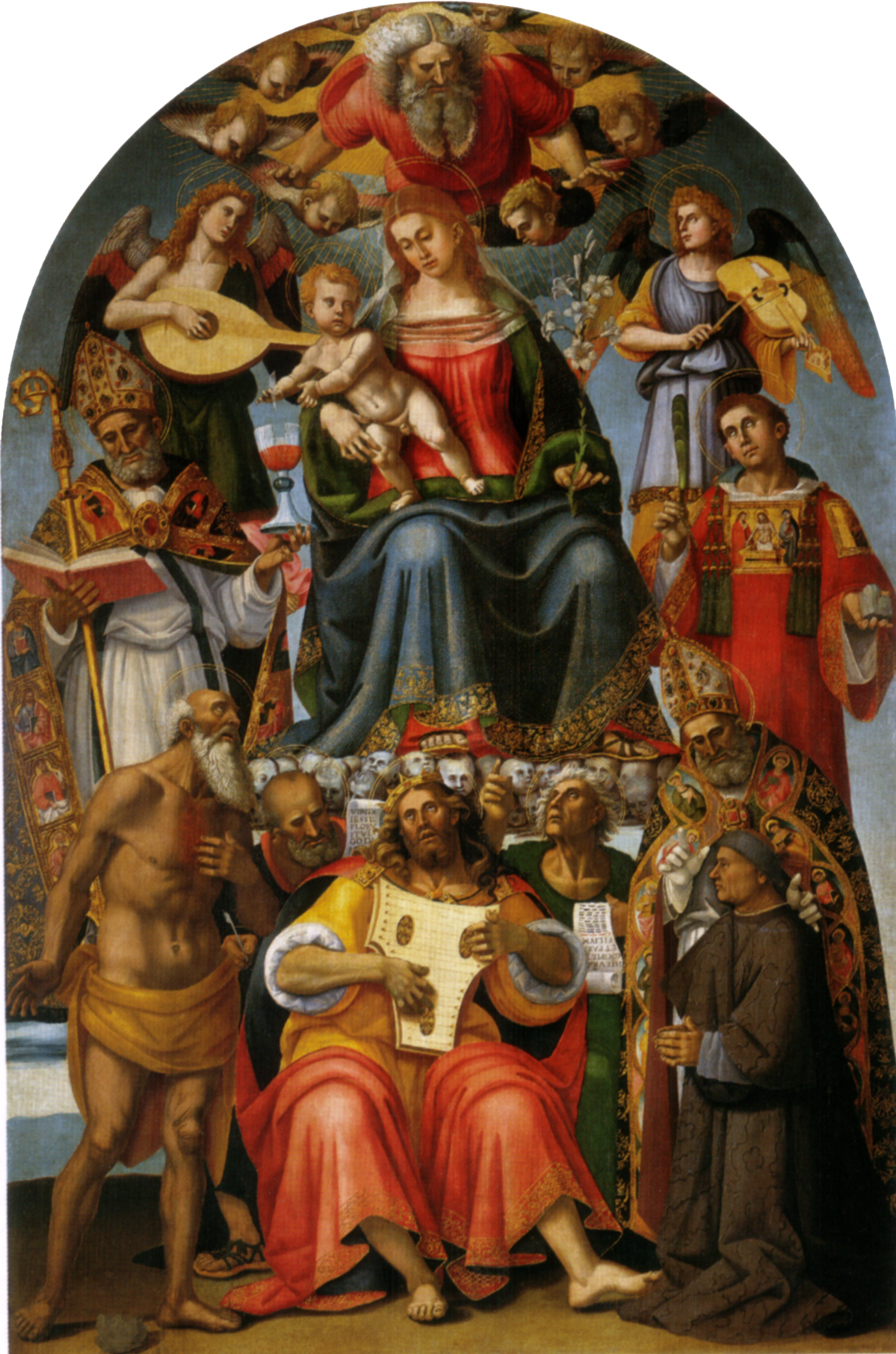
- Artist: Luca Signorelli
- Year: c. 1519–1523
- Medium: Tempera on panel
- Dimensions: 357 cm × 248 cm (141 in × 98 in)
- Location: Museo nazionale d'arte medievale e moderna, Arezzo

The Madonna with Child and Saints is a painting by the Italian late Renaissance painter Luca Signorelli, executed around 1519–1523. It is housed in the Museo nazionale d'arte medievale e moderna, in Arezzo. The picture is a traditional Holy Conversation composition.

== History ==
The painting was commissioned by the Brotherhood of St. Jerome in Arezzo for their seat. The work was executed in Cortona and was brought to Arezzo by the painter himself, who was then in his seventies (here, he resided in the Vasari family's house and met the young Giorgio Vasari, his future biographer, who started to practice painting after Signorelli's suggestion).

It is the last work by Signorelli, who died after returning to Cortona.

== Sources ==
- Paolucci, Antonio (2004). "Luca Signorelli". Pittori del Rinascimento. Florence: Scala.
