= Monaldi =

Monaldi is an Italian surname. Notable people with the surname include:

- Diego Monaldi (born 1993), Italian professional basketball player
- Paolo Monaldi (1710–after 1779), Italian painter of the late-Baroque or Rococo style
- Rita Monaldi (born 1966), Italian journalist and writer
- Vincenzo Monaldi (1899–1969), Italian physician and physiologist

== Other ==
- Monaldi & Sorti, pen name of the Italian married couple writer duo Rita Monaldi and Francesco Sorti
- Monaldo
