= The Preaching of the Antichrist =

Fresco by Luca Signorelli

- La predicazione dell'Anticristo (Italian)
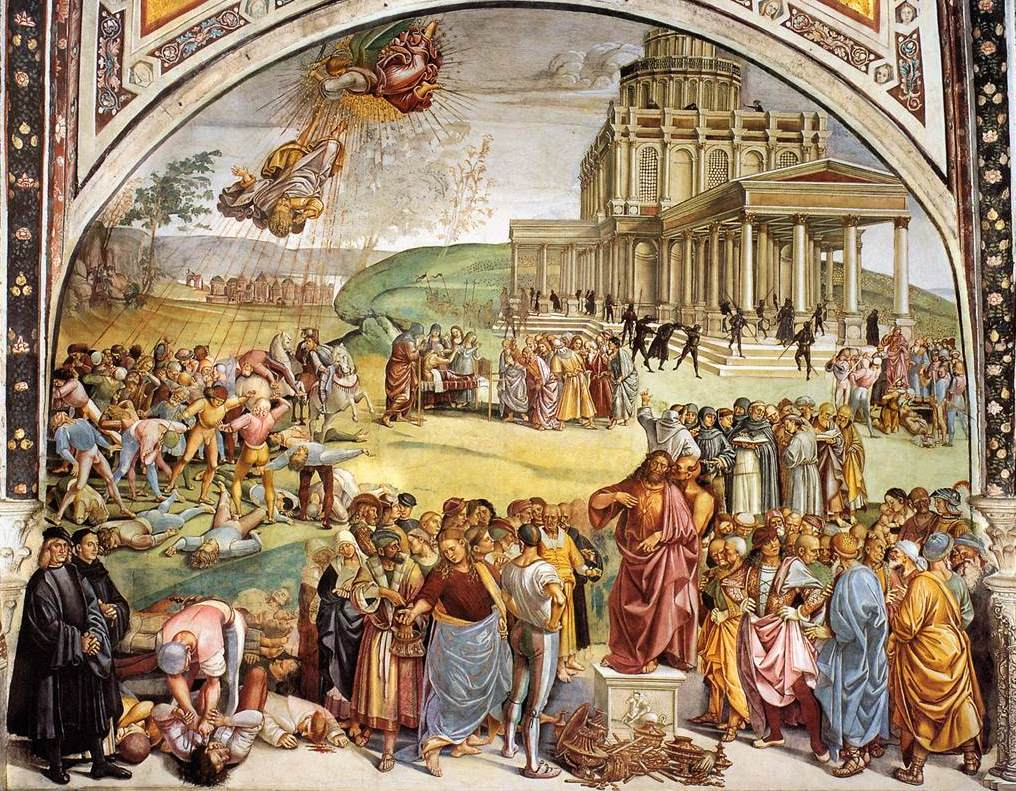
- Artist: Luca Signorelli
- Year: 1500–1504
- Type: Fresco
- Dimensions: 13.70 m × 12 m (539.3 in × 472.4 in)
- Location: Orvieto Cathedral

The Preaching of the Antichrist (Italian: La predicazione dell'Anticristo) is a fresco by the Italian Renaissance painter Luca Signorelli. It is one of the scenes of what is considered his masterpiece, the cycle of frescoes with apocalyptic themes that decorate the Chapel of San Brizio in Orvieto Cathedral (1499–1504). Michelangelo was inspired for his The Last Judgment by observing Signorelli's frescoes in Orvieto.

In this scene the Antichrist is represented preaching in a way analogous to how the sermons of Christ used to be represented. But it is appreciated that it is the devil who whispers what he has to tell. Instead of rays of golden light, they are blood red in color at the point where the Archangel Michael is heading towards Earth to fight the Antichrist.

In the lower left corner are two dark-clad gentlemen; the man to the left is apparently a self-portrait, while the man to the right could be Fra Angelico.

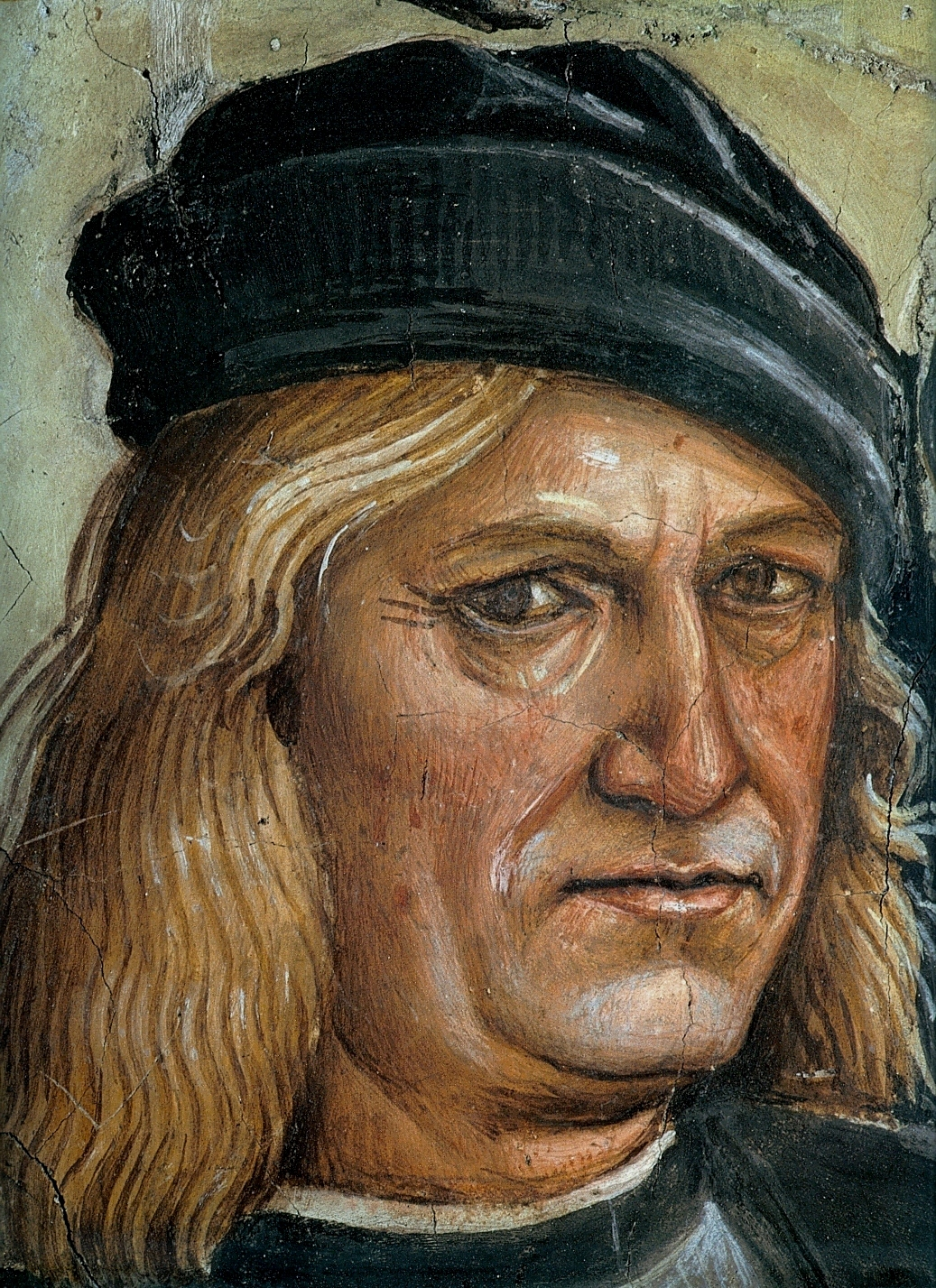
Self-portrait of Luca Signorelli, detail of this scene.
