= Arcevia Altarpiece =

Painting by Luca Signorelli

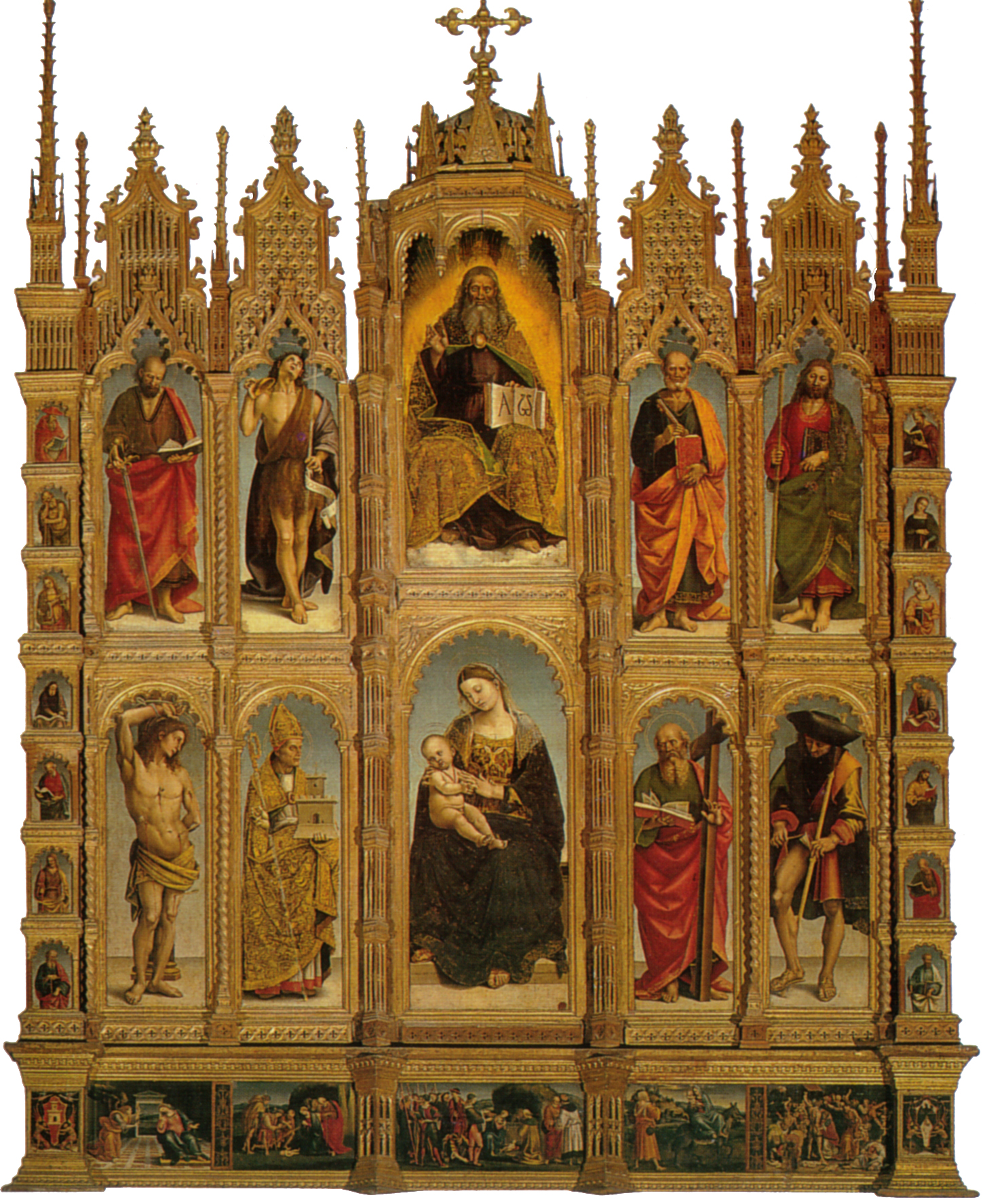
Arcevia Altarpiece (1508) by Luca Signorelli

The Arcevia Altarpiece is a 1508 oil on panel painting by Luca Signorelli, shown in the collegiate church of San Medardo in Arcevia, for which it was originally painted. It is signed below the Madonna's feet.LUCAS. SIGNORELLUS / PINGEBAT M. D. VIII

== Panels ==
- Upper register - Saint Paul, Saint John the Baptist, God the Father Blessing and Holding a Book Inscribed Alpha and Omega, Saint Peter, Saint James the Great
- Lower register - Saint Sebastian, Saint Medardus, Madonna and Child Enthroned, Saint Andrew, Saint Roch
- Left and right columns - each has seven indistinct figures of saints, surmounting two heraldic medallions at the base (tower to the left, eagle to the right)
- Predella - Episodes from the Childhood of Christ (Annunciation, Nativity, Adoration of the Magi, Flight into Egypt, Massacre of the Innocents)
