= Madonna and Child with Ignudi =

Painting by Luca Signorelli

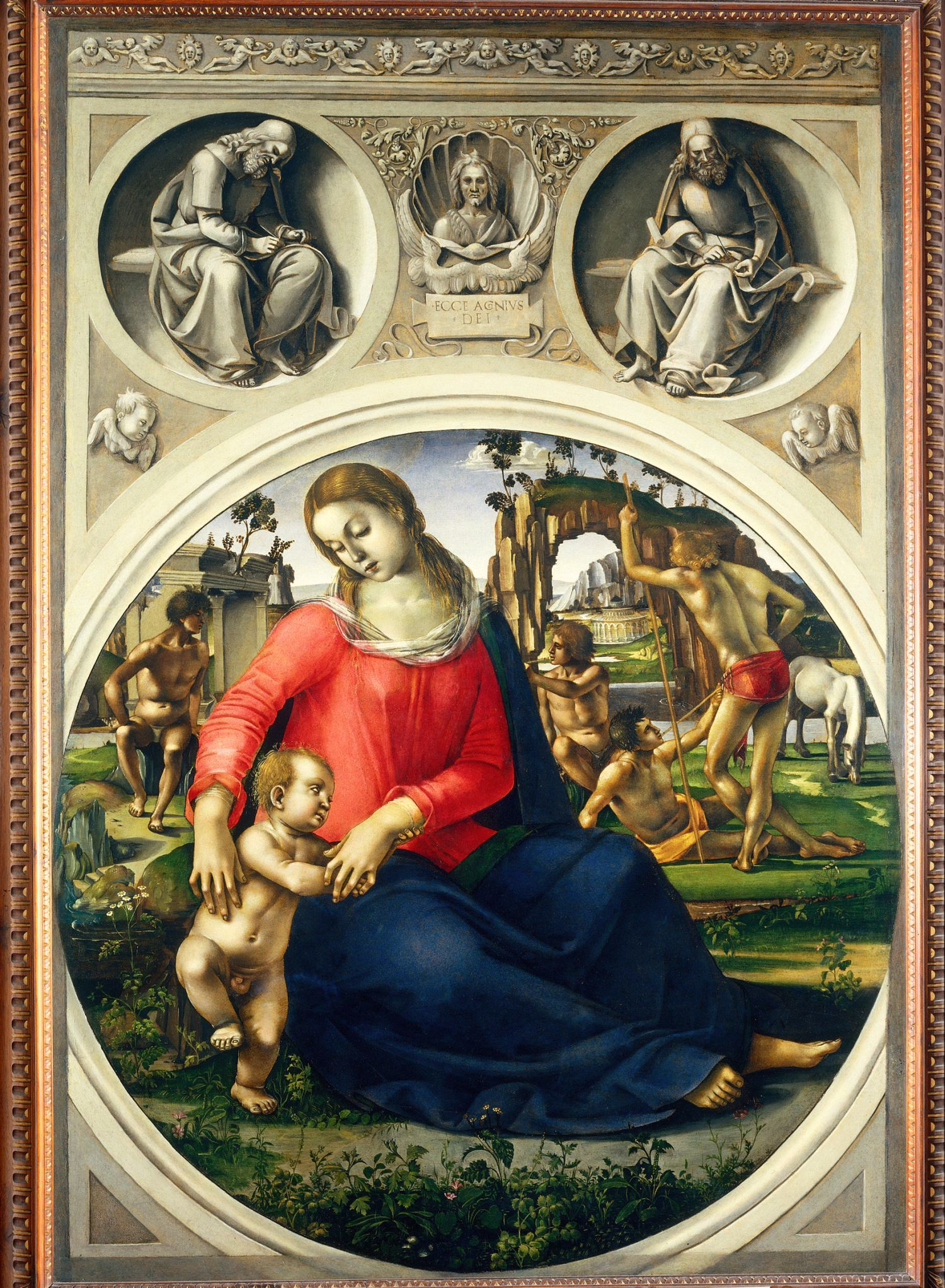
Madonna and Child with Ignudi (c. 1490) by Luca Signorelli

Madonna and Child with Ignudi is a tempera on panel painting by Luca Signorelli, created c. 1490, produced for the Medici Villa di Castello, where it was seen by Giorgio Vasari. It was probably a commission from Lorenzo di Pierfrancesco de' Medici, who also commissioned Primavera and Birth of Venus from Botticelli. It is now in the Uffizi in Florence. Its title refers to the ignudi in the background.
