= Madonna and Child with the Holy Trinity and Two Saints =

1510 painting by Luca Signorelli

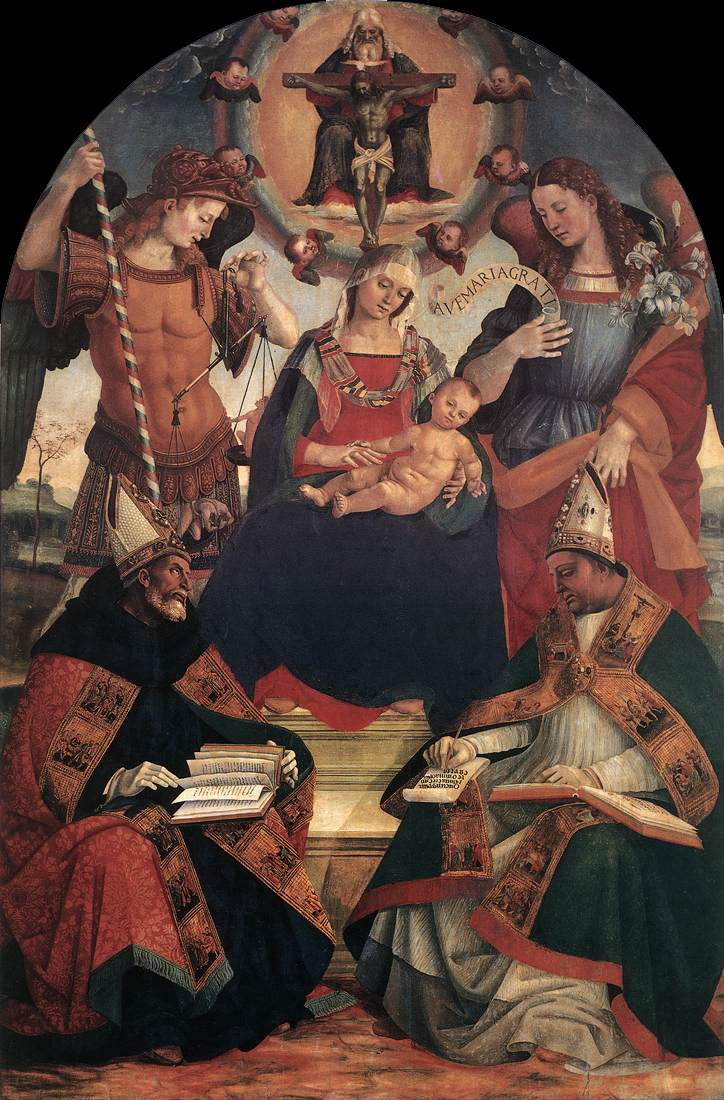
Madonna and Child with the Holy Trinity and Two Saints (1510) by Luca Signorelli

Madonna and Child with the Holy Trinity and Two Saints is a painting by Luca Signorelli, from 1510, now in the Uffizi in Florence. It is a sacra conversazione, with the Madonna enthroned between Michael and Gabriel, with Augustine (left) and Athanasius (right) below and the Holy Trinity above.

It was originally commissioned by the Confraternity of the Trinity for pilgrims in Cortona, the town where Signorelli was born and produced several works. It was later in the San Niccolò Monastery in Cafaggio from 1810 to 1919. Its predella included scenes of The Wedding at Cana, Christ at Gethsemane and The Flagellation of Christ - it was detached and moved to the Galleria dell'Accademia, also in Florence.
