= Gianfrancesco Gambara =

Italian Roman Catholic cardinal and bishop

His Eminence Gianfrancesco Gambara
- Cardinal-Bishop of Palestrina
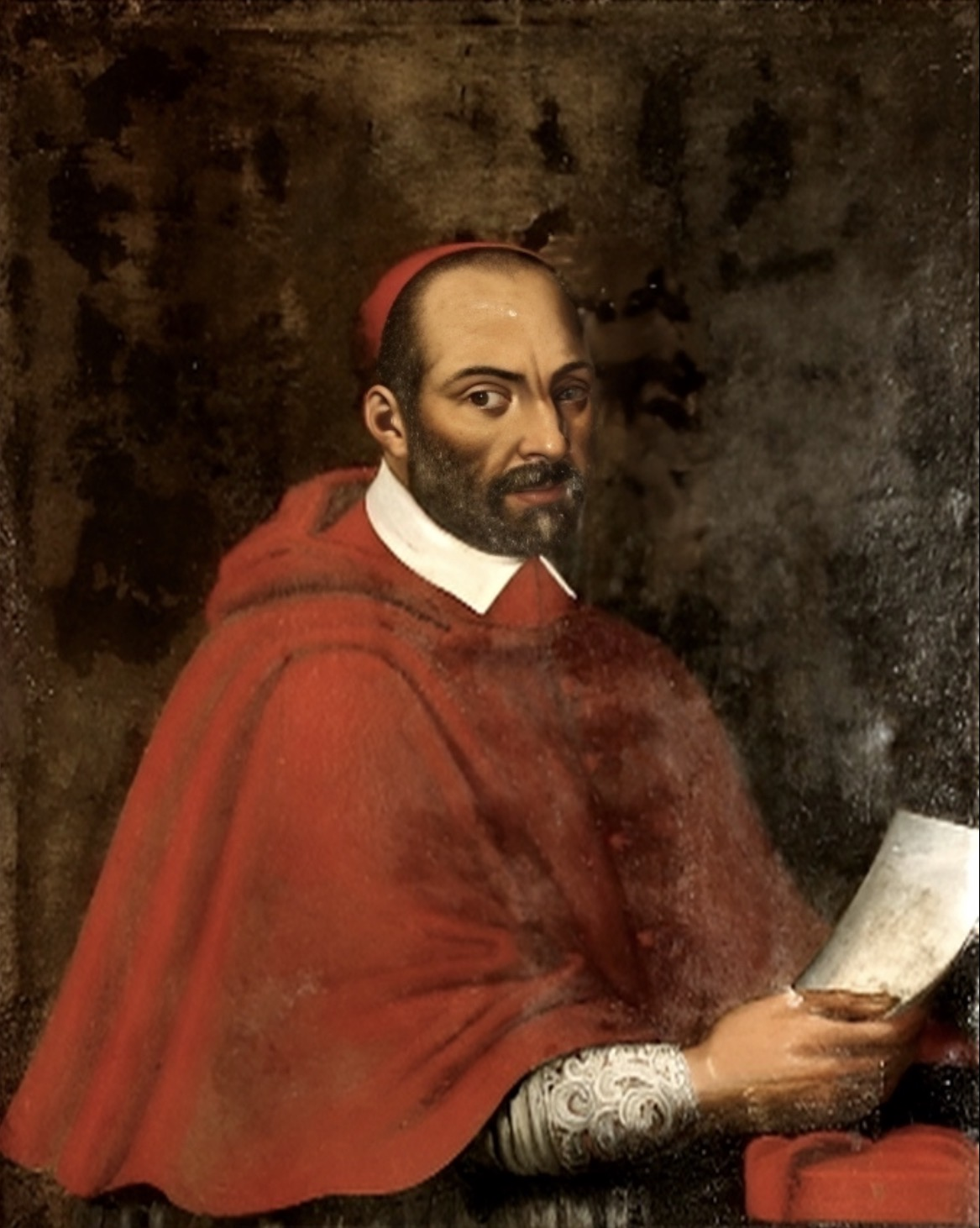
- Portrait of Cardinal Gambara, 16th century
- Church: Catholic Church
- Appointed: 4 March 1583
- Term ended: 5 May 1587
- Predecessor: Giovanni Antonio Serbelloni
- Successor: Marco Antonio Colonna
- Previous posts: See list: Cardinal-Deacon of Santi Marcellino e Pietro al Laterano (1561–1565); Cardinal-Priest of Santa Pudenziana (1565-1570); Bishop of Viterbo (1566-1576); Cardinal-Priest of Santa Prisca (1570-1572); Cardinal-Priest of Sant'Anastasia (1572-1578); Cardinal-Priest of San Clemente (1578-1579); Cardinal-Priest of Santa Maria in Trastevere (1579-1580); Cardinal-Bishop of Albano (1580-1583)

Orders
- Consecration: 13 October 1566 by Pope Pius V
- Created cardinal: 26 February 1561 by Pope Pius IV
- Rank: Cardinal-Bishop

Personal details
- Born: 16 February 1533 Brescia, Italy
- Died: 5 May 1587 (aged 54) Rome, Papal States
- Buried: Santa Maria della Quercia

Gianfrancesco Gambara (1533–1587) was an Italian Roman Catholic cardinal and bishop.

== Early life ==
Gianfrancesco Gambara was born in Brescia on 16 February 1533, the son of Brunoro Gambara, count of Pralboino (a field marshal in the army of Charles V, Holy Roman Emperor) and Virginia Pallavicini, widow of Ranuccio Farnese. He was the nephew of Cardinal Uberto Gambara. After his father's death, his mother married a third time, to Gilberto Borromeo, making Charles Borromeo his stepbrother.

He began his studies at the University of Padua, then continued at the University of Bologna. He completed his studies at the University of Perugia, becoming a doctor of both laws.

== Clerical career ==
He then joined his uncle the cardinal at the court of Charles V. He later traveled to Rome and joined the court of Pope Julius III, who made him a privy chamberlain. During the pontificate of Pope Pius IV, he became a cleric of the Apostolic Camera, eventually becoming its president.

Pope Pius IV made him a cardinal deacon in the consistory of 26 February 1561. He received the red hat and the titular church of Santi Marcellino e Pietro al Laterano (declared a deaconry pro illa vice) on 10 March 1561.

As cardinal, he participated in the Council of Trent 1562-63. In 1564, he signed the acts of the Council of Trent in the name of Pope Pius IV. From 22 August 1565 until 20 January 1566 he was papal legate in Camerino. He opted for the titular church of Santa Pudenziana on 17 November 1565. He participated in the papal conclave of 1565-66 that elected Pope Pius V.

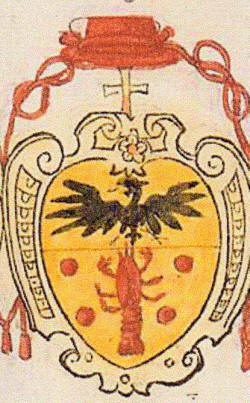
Coat of arms of Cardinal Gianfrancesco Gambara

On 7 October 1566 he was elected Bishop of Viterbo. He was consecrated as a bishop by Pope Pius V in the Sistine Chapel on 13 October 1566. In 1566, in the wake of an epidemic, he was put in charge of sanitation for Rome. On 4 July 1567 he was named inquisitor general. He opted for the titular church of Santa Prisca on 3 July 1570. He was a participant in the papal conclave of 1572 that elected Pope Gregory XIII. On 17 October 1572 he opted for the titular church of Sant'Anastasia. He resigned the government of his diocese sometime before 28 March 1576. He opted for the titular church of San Clemente on 9 July 1578, and then for Santa Maria in Trastevere on 17 August 1579.

On 5 December 1580 he opted for the order of cardinal bishops and received the suburbicarian see of Albano. He opted for the suburbicarian see of Palestrina on 4 March 1583. He was a participant in the papal conclave of 1585 that elected Pope Sixtus V.

== Death ==
He died in Rome on 5 May 1587. He was buried in the church of Santa Maria della Quercia in Viterbo.
