= Monaldo Trofi =

Italian painter

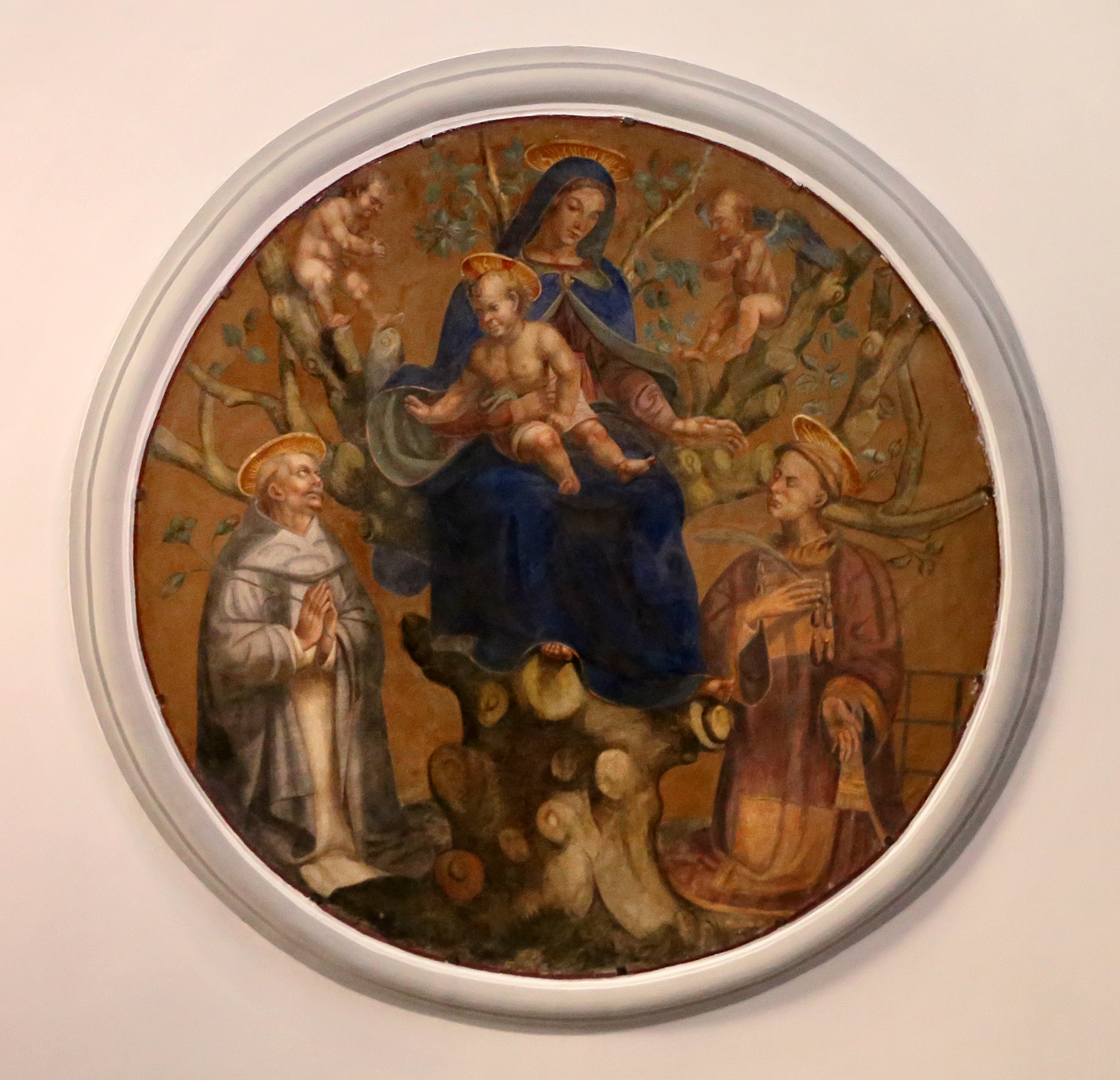
Madonna della Quercia, Viterbo

Monaldo Trofi -- also known as Monaldo Corso or Monaldo da Viterbo or il Truffetta -- (active 1505-circa 1539) was an Italian painter of the Renaissance active in Viterbo, region of Lazio, Italy.

== Biography ==
Trofi was said to have been born in Viterbo in the late 1480s, but it is unclear with whom he trained. The obvious cited master is Antonio del Massaro (ca. 1450–1516), the main local artist of the prior generation. His style sometimes resembles Luca Signorelli. He is documented in 1504 in association with works at the Corneto Cathedral with the two painters above and Constantino di Jacopo di Zello.

Most of his output, signed or attributed, are sacred paintings. He is said to have painted a Nativity for a church in Canino He also painted an Enthroned Madonna and Child between St John Evangelist, St Francis of Assisi, St Jerome and St John the Baptist for the church of San Francesco in Canino. The Walters Art Gallery in Baltimore has two tablets depicting St Anthony Abbot and St Sebastian, attributed to Trofi, and dated circa 1505. He painted a Deposition located in the Museo Nazionale of Tarquinia dated 1507.
