= Luca Signorelli =

Italian Renaissance painter (c. 1441 1445–1523)

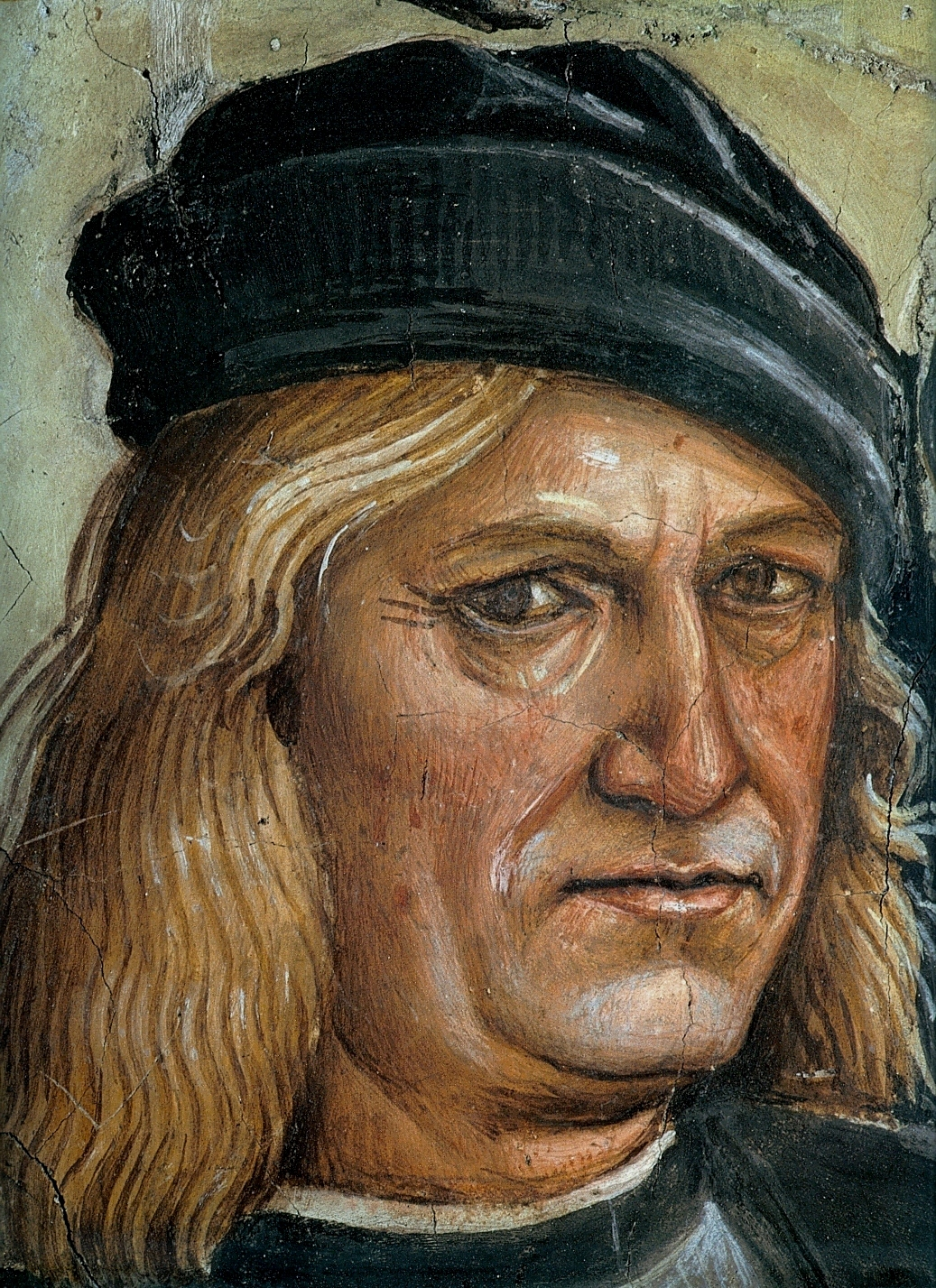
- Self-portrait of Signorelli, from The Preaching of the Antichrist, 1500–1504
- Born: Luca d'Egidio di Ventura; 1441; Cortona, Italy
- Died: 16 October 1523 (aged 81–82); Cortona, Italy
- Known for: Painting
- Movement: Early Renaissance
- Spouse: Gallizia di Piero Carnesecchi
- Father: Egidio di Ventura

Luca Signorelli (c. 1441/1445 – 16 October 1523) was an Italian Renaissance painter from Cortona, in Tuscany, who was noted in particular for his ability as a draftsman and his use of foreshortening. His massive frescos of the Last Judgment (1499–1503) in Orvieto Cathedral are considered his masterpiece.

In his early 40s he returned to live in Cortona, after working in Florence, Siena and Rome (1478–84, painting a now lost section of the Sistine Chapel). With an established reputation, he remained based in Cortona for the rest of his life, but often travelled to the cities of the region to fulfill commissions. He was probably trained by Piero della Francesca in Florence, as his cousin Giorgio Vasari wrote.

Cortona hosted a major exhibition in 2023 to celebrate the 500th anniversary of his death.

== Biography ==
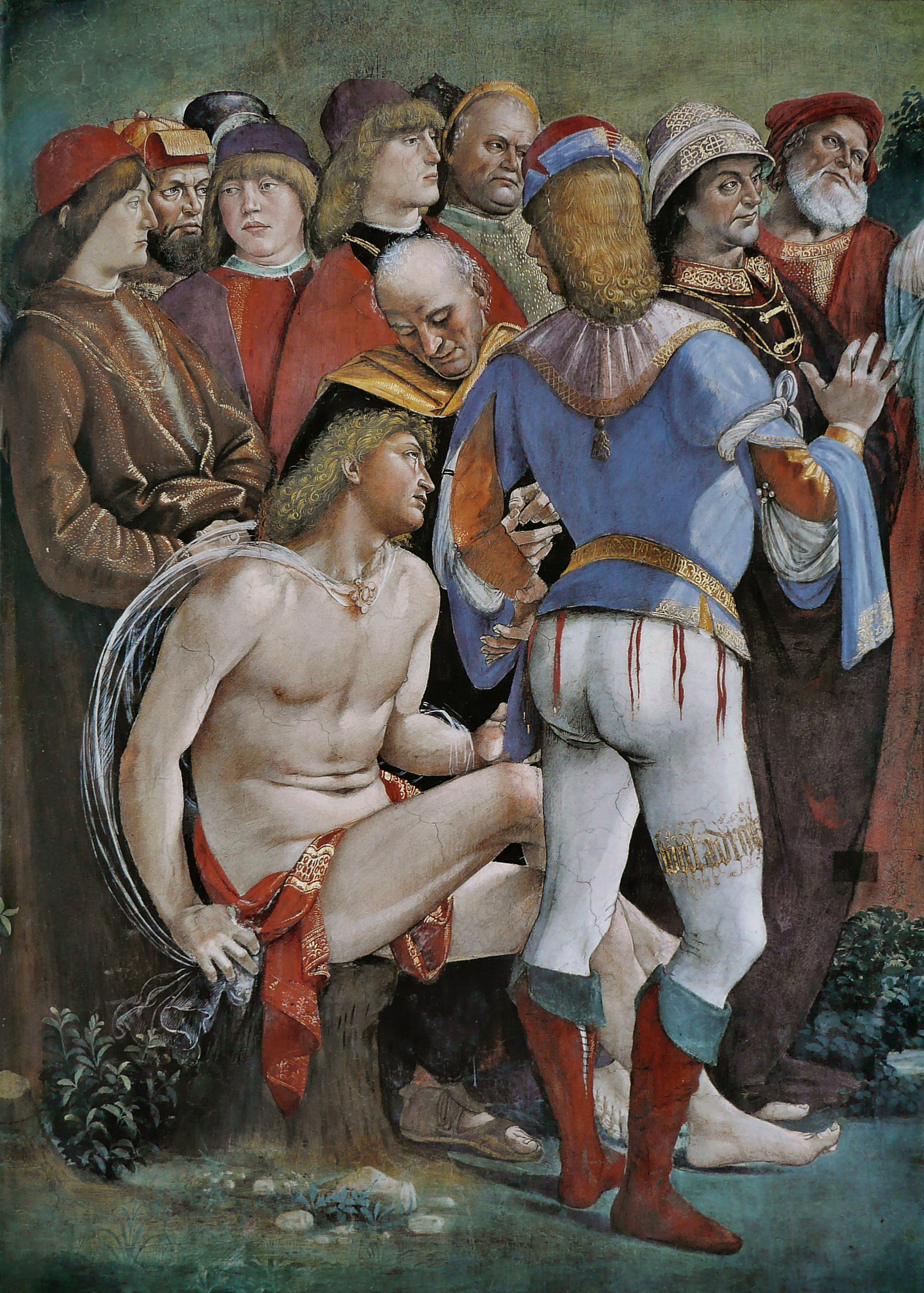
Testament and Death of Moses, detail

He was born Luca d'Egidio di Ventura in Cortona, Tuscany (some sources call him Luca da Cortona). The precise date of his birth is uncertain, but birth dates between 1441 and 1445 have been proposed. He died in 1523 in his native Cortona, where he is buried.

His first impressions of art seem to originate in Perugia – including the styles of artists such as Benedetto Bonfigli, Fiorenzo di Lorenzo and Pinturicchio. Lazzaro Vasari, the great-grandfather of art historian Giorgio Vasari, was Luca's maternal uncle. According to Giorgio Vasari, Lazzaro had Luca apprenticed to Piero della Francesca. In 1472 the young artist was painting at Arezzo, and in 1474 at Città di Castello. He presented to Lorenzo de' Medici a work which is likely School of Pan. Janet Ross and her husband Henry discovered the painting in Florence c. 1870 and subsequently sold it to the Kaiser Frederick Museum in Berlin, though it was destroyed there a few days after the end of World War II. The painting's subject is almost the same as that which he also painted on the wall of the Petrucci palace in Siena – the principal figures being Pan himself, Olympus, Echo, a man reclining on the ground, and two listening shepherds.

Signorelli worked in central Italy, leading a very requested workshop, increasing his importance during the 1490s. He often returned to his native Cortona, and worked in nearby Umbria, especially in Città di Castello, where he left one of his masterpieces: the Martyrdome of St Sebastian (still in the umbrian town). This painting was very influential for the young Raphael, who worked in the same town and sketched some drawings of the "Martyrdom".

In 1498, Signorelli moved to the Monastery of Monte Oliveto Maggiore south of Siena, where he painted eight frescoes, forming part of a vast series depicting the life of St. Benedict; they are at present much injured. In the palace of Pandolfo Petrucci he worked on various classic or mythological subjects, including the aforementioned School of Pan. Signorelli remained healthy until his death, continuing to paint and accept commissions into his final year, including the altarpiece of the Church at Foiano.

== Work in Orvieto ==
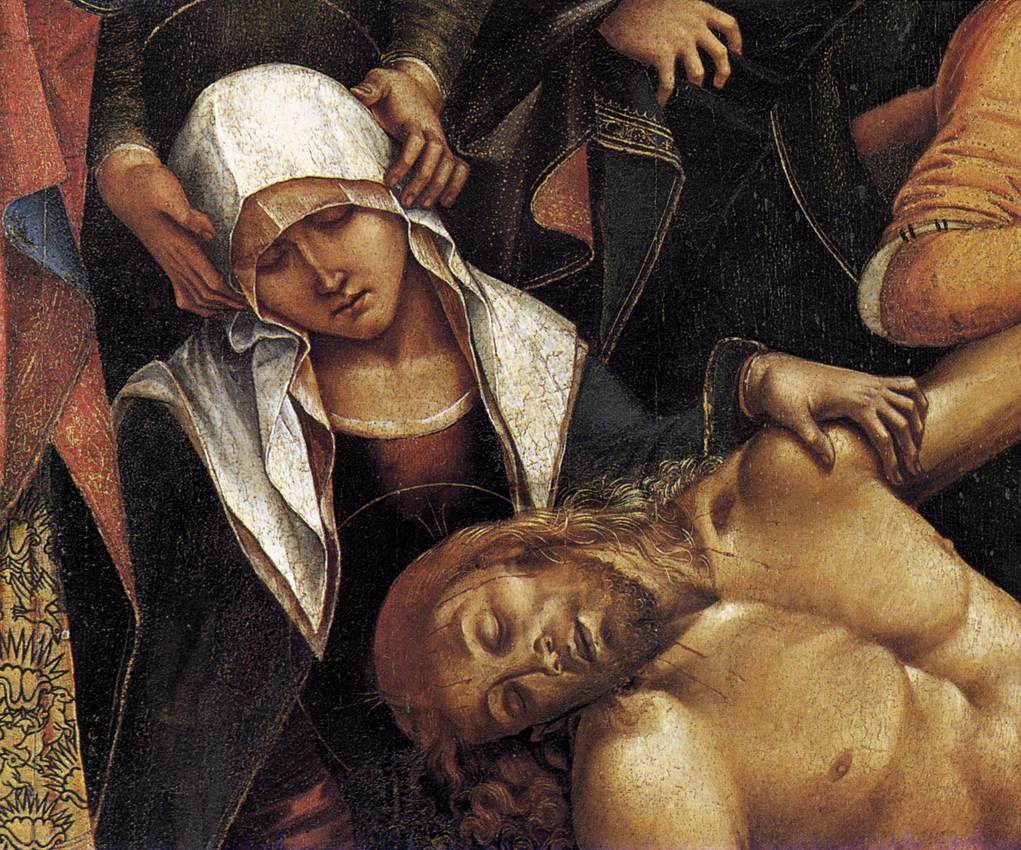
Lamentation over the Dead Christ, detail, 1502

From the Monastery of Monte Oliveto Maggiore near Siena, Signorelli went to Orvieto and produced his masterpiece, the frescoes in the chapel of S. Brizio (then called the Cappella Nuova), in the cathedral.

The Cappella Nuova already contained two groups of images in the vaulting over the altar, the Judging Christ and the Prophets, murals initially begun by Fra Angelico fifty years prior. The works of Signorelli in the vaults and on the upper walls represent the events surrounding the Apocalypse and the Last Judgment. The events of the Apocalypse fill the space which surrounds the entrance into the large chapel.

The Apocalyptic events begin with the Preaching of Antichrist, and proceed to the Doomsday and The Resurrection of the Flesh. They occupy three vast lunettes, each of them a single continuous narrative composition. In one of them, the Antichrist, after his portents and impious glories, falls headlong from the sky, crashing down into an innumerable crowd of men and women.

The events of the Last Judgment fill the facing vault and the walls around the altar. The series is composed of Paradise, the Elect and the Condemned, Hell, the Resurrection of the Dead, and the Destruction of the Reprobate.

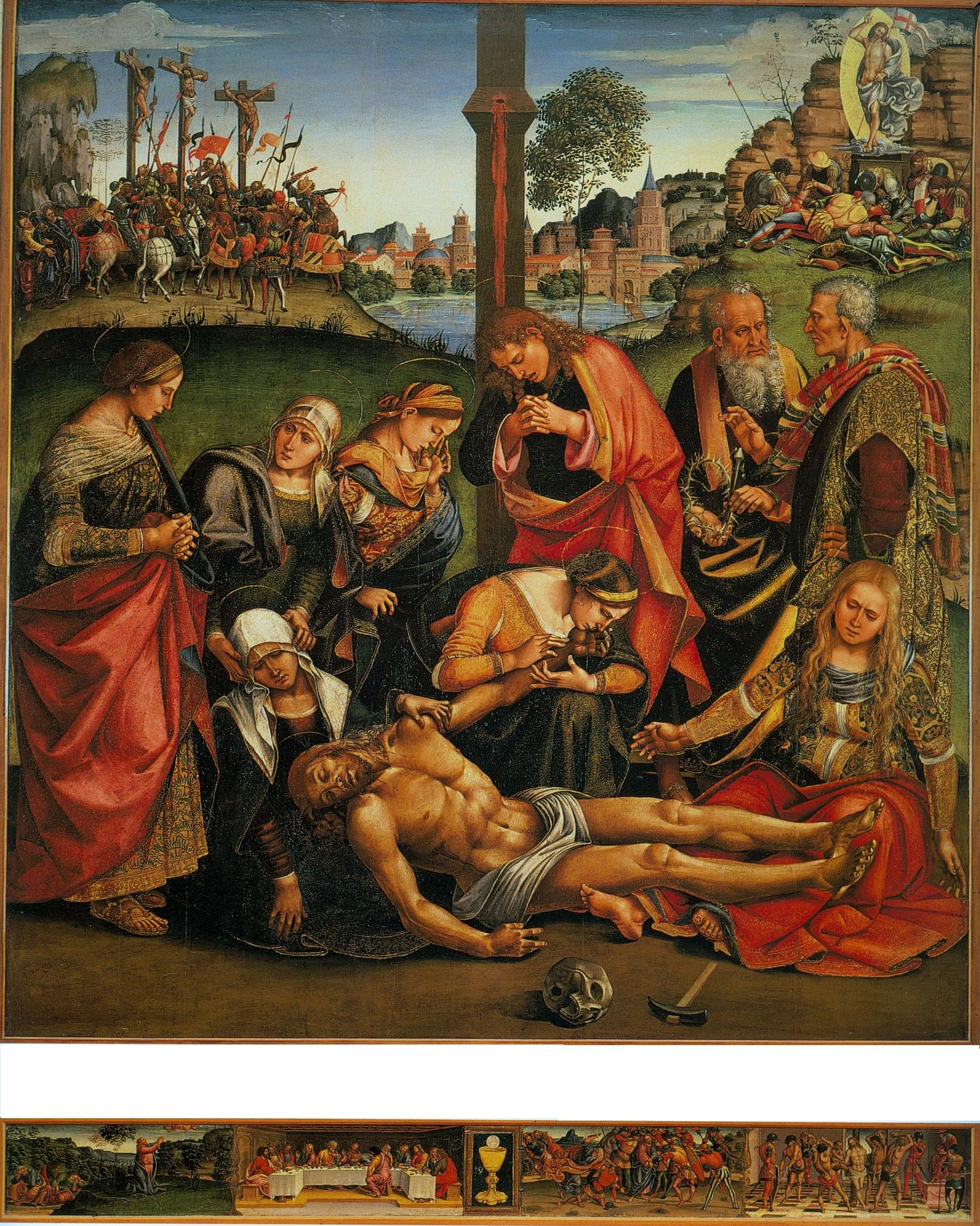
Lamentation over the Dead Christ, Diocesan Museum, Cortona

To Angelico's ceiling, which contained the Judging Christ and the Prophets led by John the Baptist, Signorelli added the Madonna leading the Apostles, the Patriarchs, Doctors of the Church, Martyrs, and Virgins. The unifying factor of the paintings is found in the scripture readings in the Roman liturgies for the Feast of All Saints and Advent.

Stylistically, the daring and terrible inventions, with their powerful treatment of the nude and arduous foreshortenings, were striking in their day. Michelangelo is claimed to have borrowed, in his own fresco at the Sistine Chapel wall, some of Signorelli's figures or combinations. The lower walls, in an unprecedented style, are richly decorated with a great deal of subsidiary work connected with Dante, specifically the first eleven books of his Purgatorio, and with the poets and legends of antiquity. A Pietà composition in a niche in the lower wall contains explicit references to two important Orvietan martyr saints, San Pietro Parenzo and San Faustino.

The contract for Signorelli's work is still on record in the archives of the Cathedral of Orvieto. He undertook the task of completing the ceiling on April 5, 1499, for 200 ducats, as well as 600 ducats for the walls, along with lodging, and a monthly payment of two measures of wine and two quarters of corn. The contract directed Signorelli to consult the Masters of the Sacred Page for theological matters. This is the first such recorded instance of an artist receiving theological advice, although art historians believe such discussions were routine. Signorelli's first stay in Orvieto lasted no more than two years. In 1502 he returned to Cortona, later returning to Orvieto to continue the lower walls. He painted a dead Christ, with Mary Magdalene, the Virgin Mary, and the local martyr Saints Pietro Parenzo and Faustino. The figure of the dead Christ, according to Vasari, is the image of Signorelli's son Antonio, who died from the plague during the course of the execution of the paintings.

== Work in Siena, Cortona, Rome, and Arezzo ==
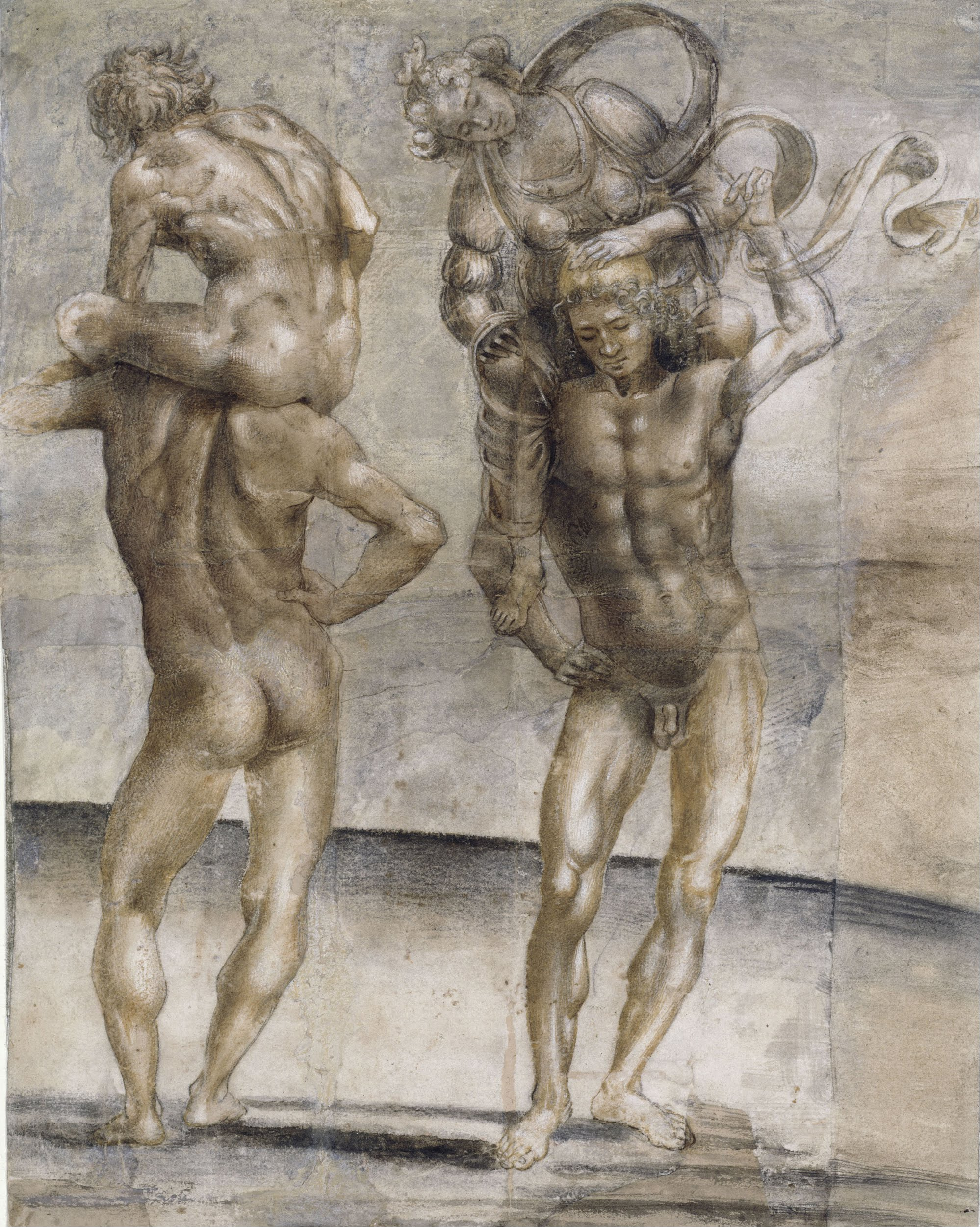
Signorelli paid great attention to anatomy. Two nude youths carrying a young woman and a young man.

After finishing the frescoes at Orvieto, Signorelli was often in Siena. In 1507 he executed a great altarpiece for S. Medardo at Arcevia in the Marche, the Madonna and Child, with the Massacre of the Innocents and other episodes.

In 1508 Pope Julius II summoned artists to Rome, including Signorelli, Perugino, Pinturicchio and Il Sodoma to paint the large rooms in the Vatican Palace. They began work, but soon the Pope dismissed all to make way for Raphael. Their work was taken down, except for the ceiling in the Stanza della Segnatura. Luca returned to Siena, but mostly lived in his hometown of Cortona. He was constantly at work, but the products of his closing years were not of the quality of his works from 1490 to 1505.

In 1520 Signorelli went with one of his pictures to Arezzo. He was partially paralyzed when he began a fresco of the Baptism of Christ in the chapel of Cardinal Passerini's palace near Cortona, which is the last picture attributed to him (alternatively, a Coronation of the Virgin at Foiano della Chiana). Signorelli stood in great repute as a citizen, entering the magistracy of Cortona as early as 1488 and holding a leading position by 1523, the year of his death.

Signorelli paid great attention to anatomy. It is said that he carried on his studies in burial grounds, and his mastery of the human form implies a familiarity resulting from dissections. He surpassed contemporaries in showing the structure and mechanism of the nude in immediate action, even going beyond nature in experiments of this kind, trying hypothetical attitudes and combinations. His drawings in the Louvre demonstrate this and bear a close analogy to the method of Michelangelo. He aimed at powerful truth rather than nobility of form; comparatively neglecting color, and his chiaroscuro exhibits sharp oppositions of lights and shadows. He had a vast influence over the painters of his own and of succeeding times, but had no pupils or assistants of high repute; one being a nephew named Francesco.

Vasari, who claimed Signorelli as a relative, described him as kindly, and a family man, and said that he always lived more like a nobleman than a painter. Vasari included Signorelli's portrait, one of seven, in his study in Arezzo, along with Michelangelo and himself. The Torrigiani Gallery in Florence contains a grand life-sized portrait by Signorelli of a man in a red cap and vest, and corresponds with Vasari's observation. In the National Gallery, London, are the Circumcision of Christ and three other works. Legend holds that Signorelli depicted himself in the left foreground of his Orvietan mural The Preaching of the Antichrist. Fra Angelico, his predecessor in the Orvieto cycle, is thought to stand behind him in the piece. However, the figure thought to be Fra Angelico is not dressed as a Dominican friar, and Signorelli's supposed portrait does not match that in Vasari's study.

== Major works ==
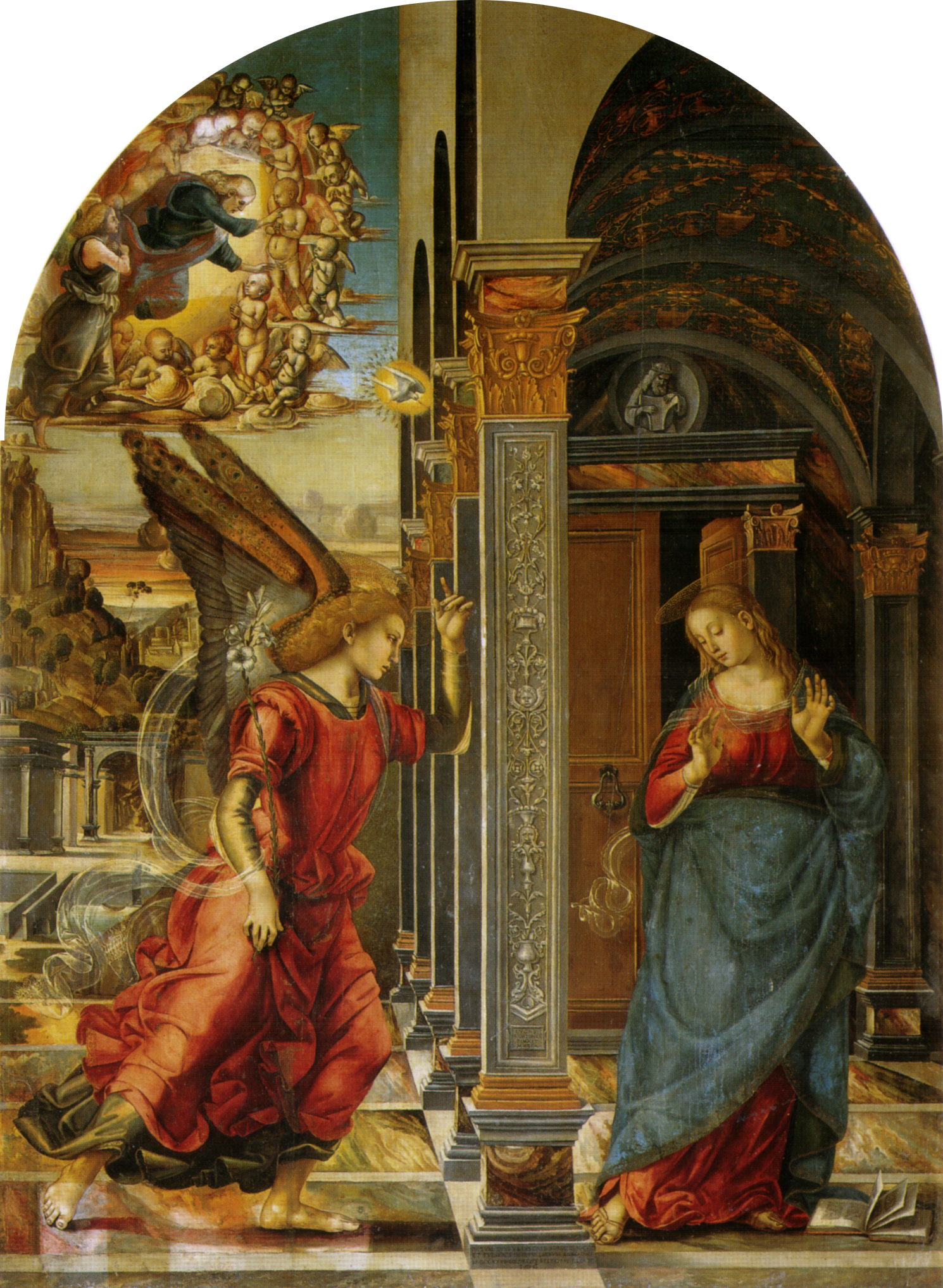
Annunciation, Volterra

- St. John's Sacristy, Loreto (1477–80) murals, Basilica della Santa Casa, Loreto
- The Scourging of Christ (c. 1480) – Tempera on roundheaded panel, 84 × 57 cm, Pinacoteca di Brera, Milan
- Testament and Death of Moses (1481–1482) – Fresco, 350 × 572 cm, Sistine Chapel, Vatican
- Sant'Onofrio Altarpiece (1484) – Panel, 221 × 189 cm, Museo dell'Opera del Duomo, Perugia
- Madonna and Child (1484) – Panel, 170 × 117.5 cm, Uffizi, Florence
- The Circumcision (c. 1490–91) – Oil on panel transferred to canvas, 259 × 180 cm, National Gallery, London
- Madonna and Child with St. Joseph and Another Saint (1490–1492) – Panel, diameter: 99 cm, Galleria Palatina, Palazzo Pitti, Florence
- Portrait of a Man (c. 1492) – Tempera on panel, 50 × 32, Gemäldegalerie, Berlin
- The Adoration of the Shepherds (1496) – Painted for the church of San Francesco, Città di Castello
- Martyrdom of St Sebastian(1498) – Pinacoteca Comunale, Città di Castello
- The Damned Cast into Hell (c. 1499) – San Brizio Chapel, Orvieto Cathedral, Orvieto, Italy
- Allegory of Fertility and Abundance (c. 1500) – Tempera on panel, Uffizi, Florence
- Lamentation over the Dead Christ (1502) – Wood, 270 × 240 cm, Museo Diocesano, Cortona
- File:Vitellozzo Vitelli.jpg Portrait of Vitellozzo Vitelli (1500–1503) – Panel, Museo dell'Opera del Duomo, Orvieto
- Mary Magdalene (1504) – Panel, Museo dell'Opera del Duomo, Orvieto
- Calvary (1505)
- Arcevia Altarpiece (1508), oil, Collegiate church of San Medardo, Arcevia
- The Coronation of the Virgin (1508) – painted for the Filippini Chapel in the church of San Francesco, Arcevia
- The Trinity, the Virgin and Two Saints (1510) – Tempera on wood, 272 × 180 cm, Uffizi, Florence
- Communion of the Apostles (1512) – Panel, 232 × 220 cm, Museo Diocesano, Cortona
- Saint Catherine of Alexandria (c. 1512) – Tempera on panel, Museo Horne, Florence
- Madonna with Child and Saints (1515) – Painted for church of San Francesco, Montone, now in the National Gallery, London
- Madonna and Child with Saints (c. 1519–1523) – Tempera on panel, Museo di arte medievale e moderna, Arezzo
- Immaculate Conception (c. 1523) – Panel, 217 × 210 cm, Museo Diocesano, Cortona
- Madonna and Child with Saints (mid or late 1510s) – Panel, Museo Nazionale di Castel Sant'Angelo, Rome
Luca Signorelli's works

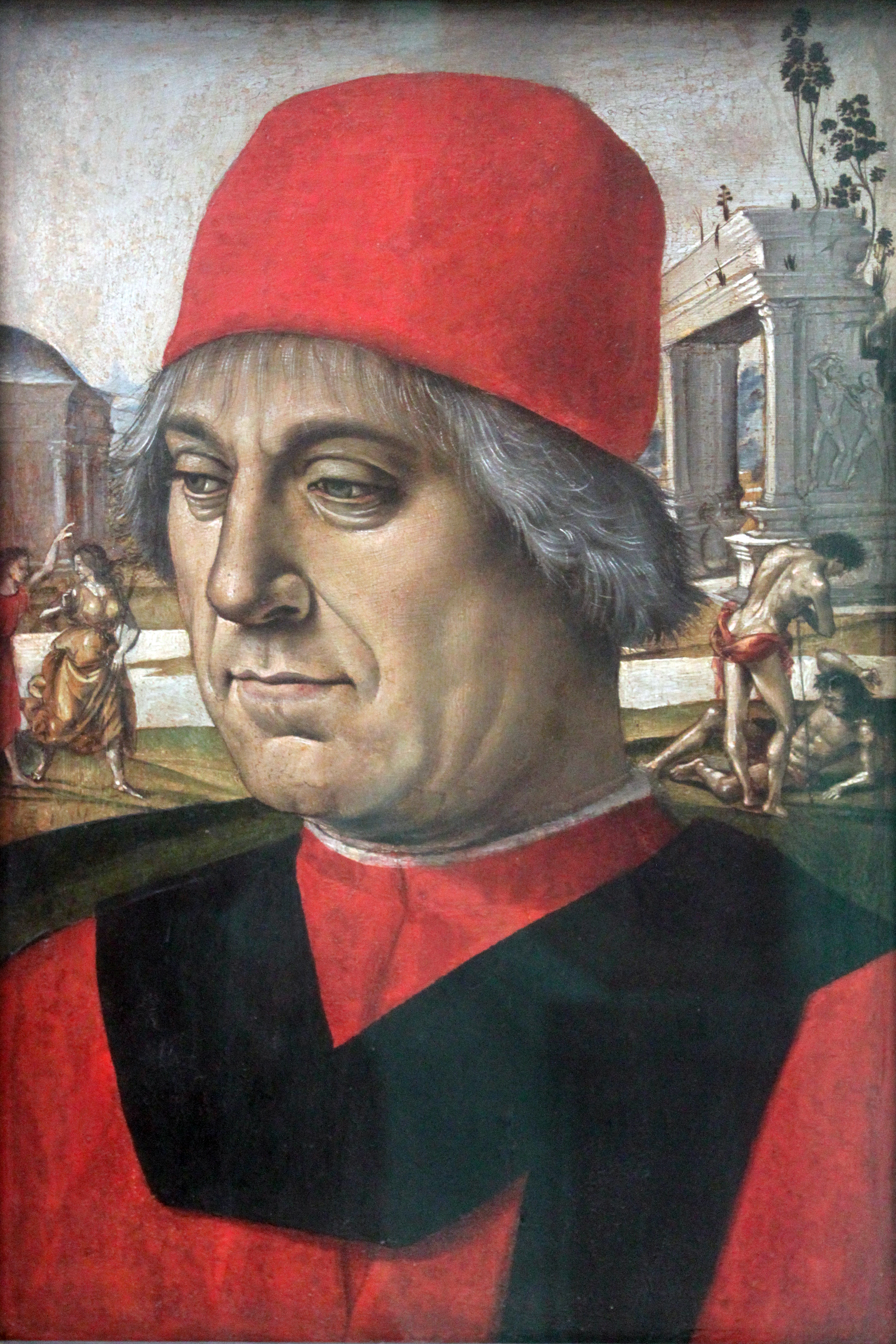
Portrait of an older man (1492)

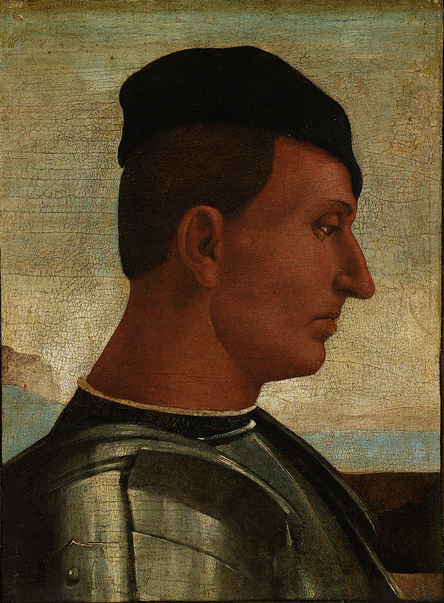
Portrait of Camillo Vitelli (c. 1493–1496)

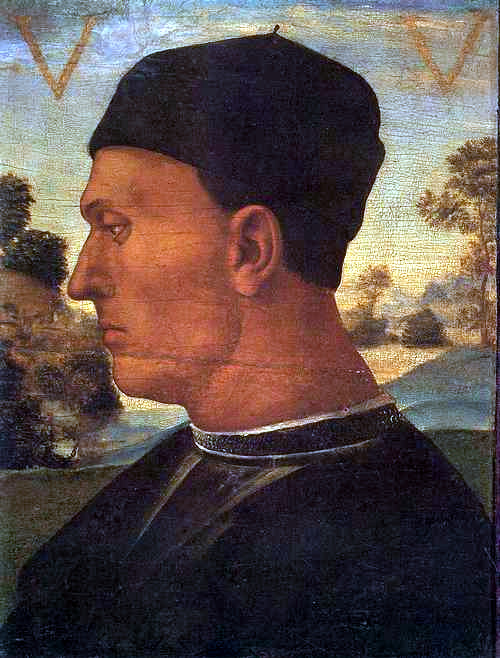
Portrait of Vitellozzo Vitelli

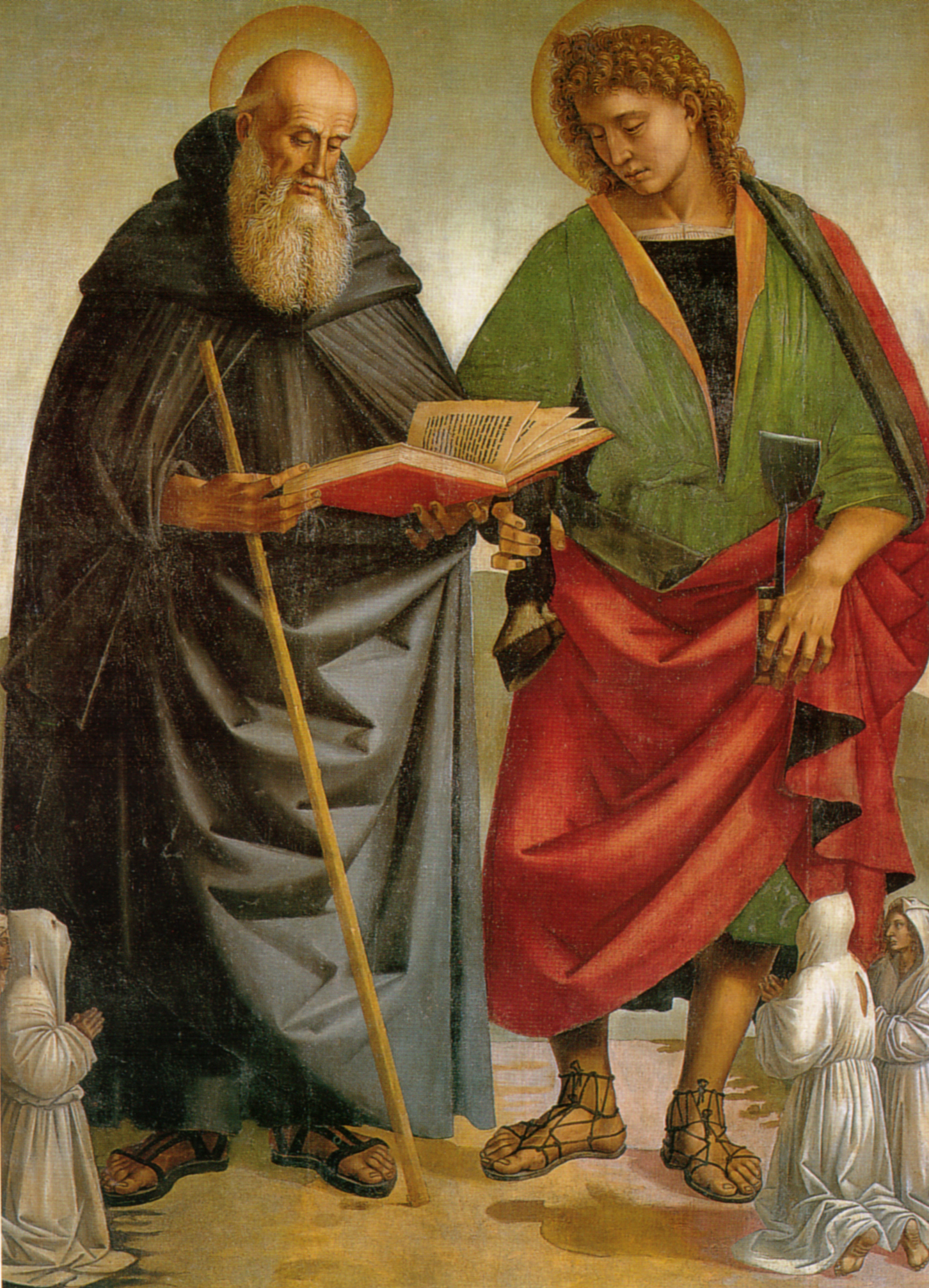
Saint Anthony and Saint Eligius

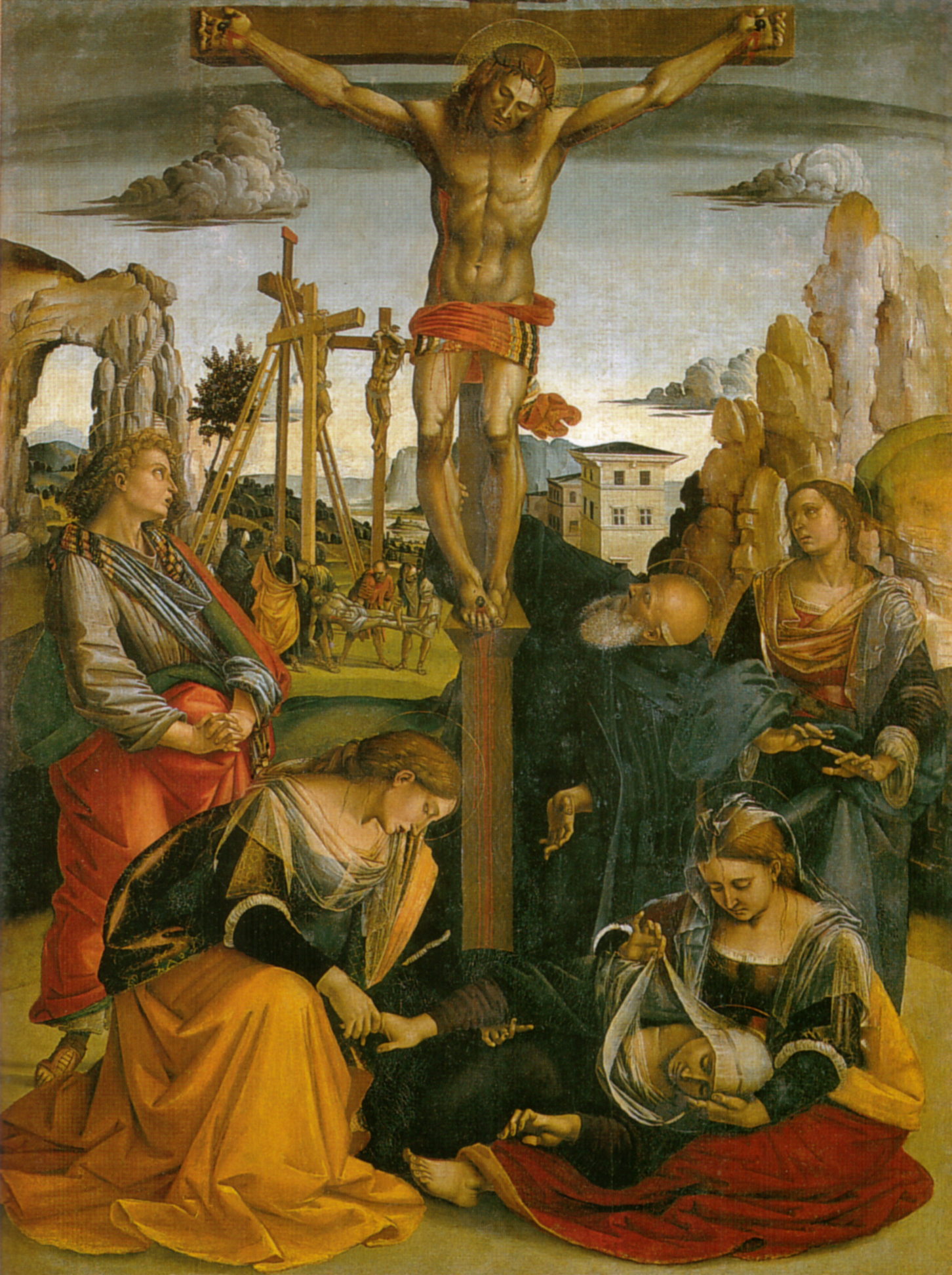
Crucifixion

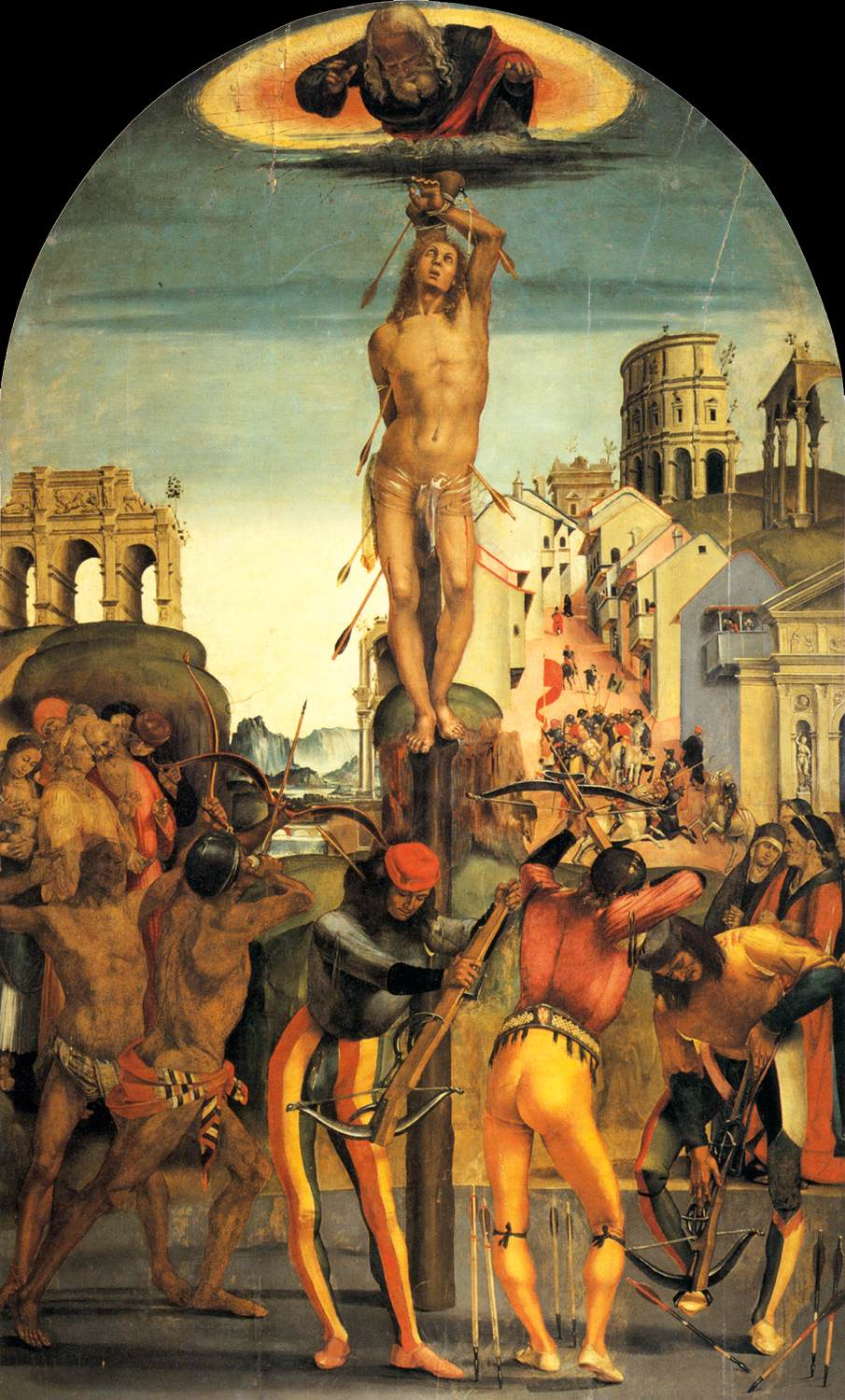
Martyrdom of St Sebastian

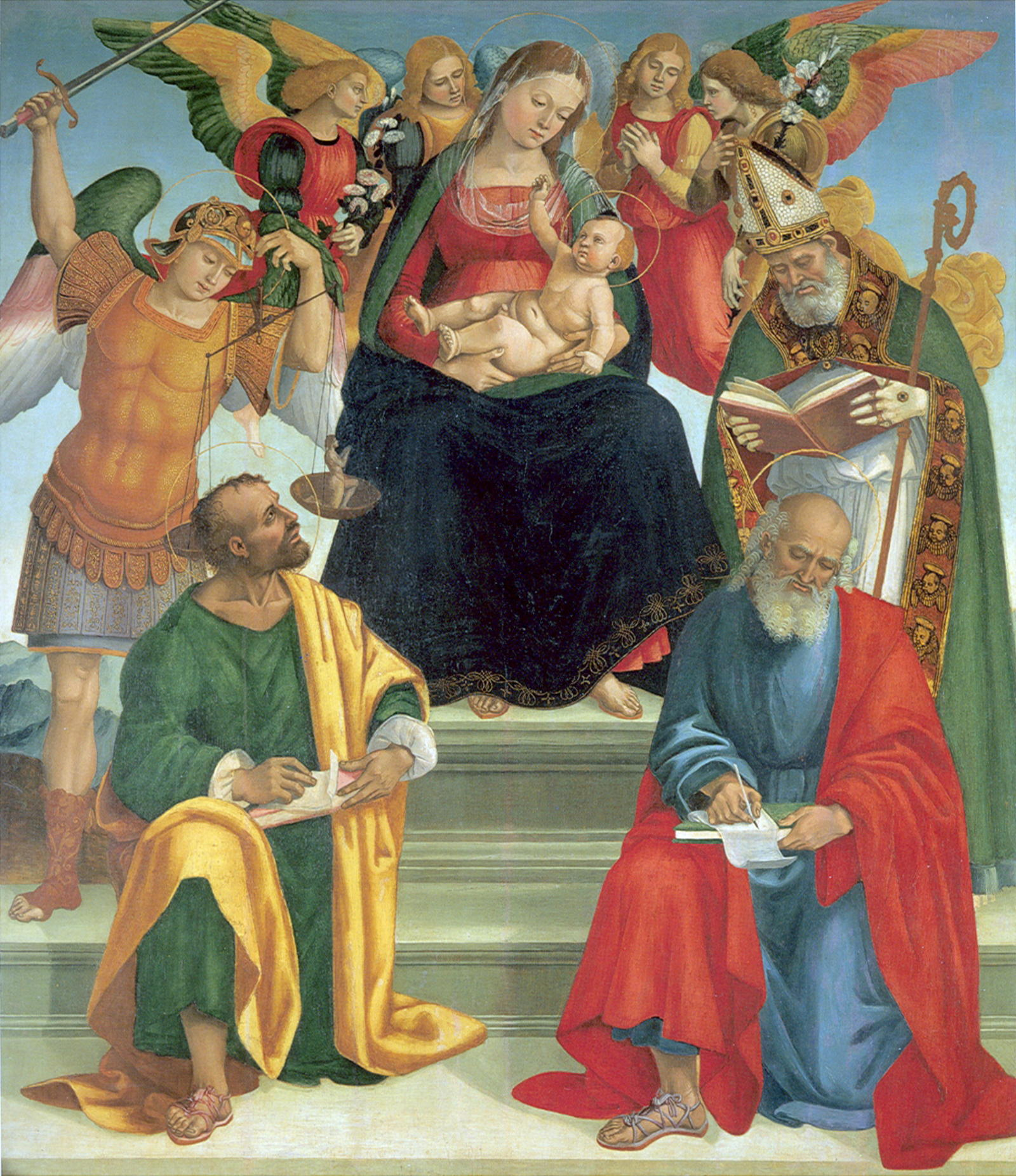
Madonna and Child with Saints and Angels

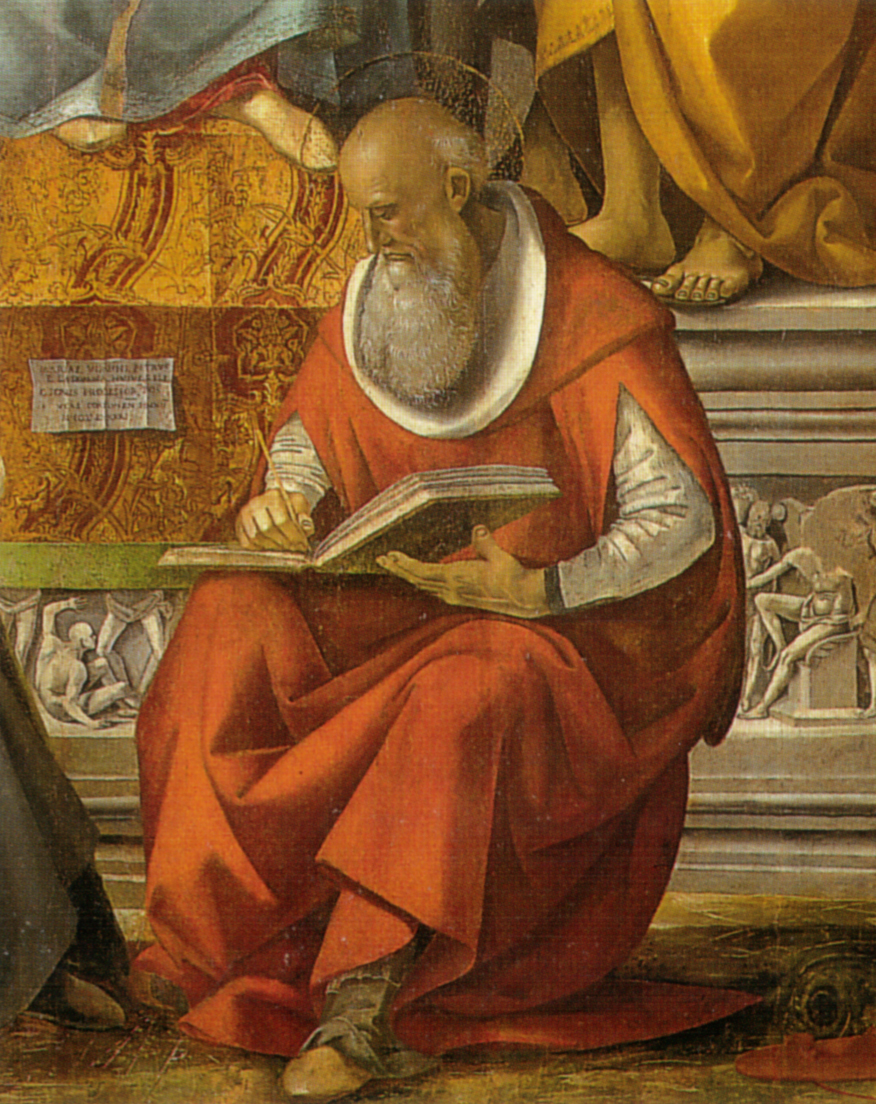
Madonna with Angels and Saints, detail, San Girolamo (Saint Jerome)
Frescos

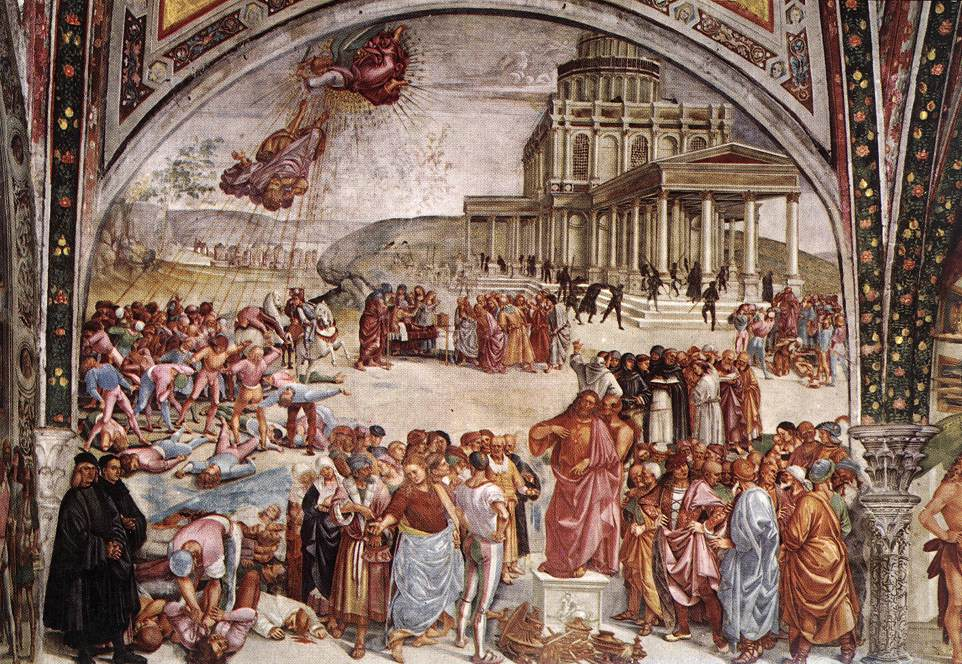
Fresco of the Deeds of the Antichrist (c. 1501) in Orvieto Cathedral

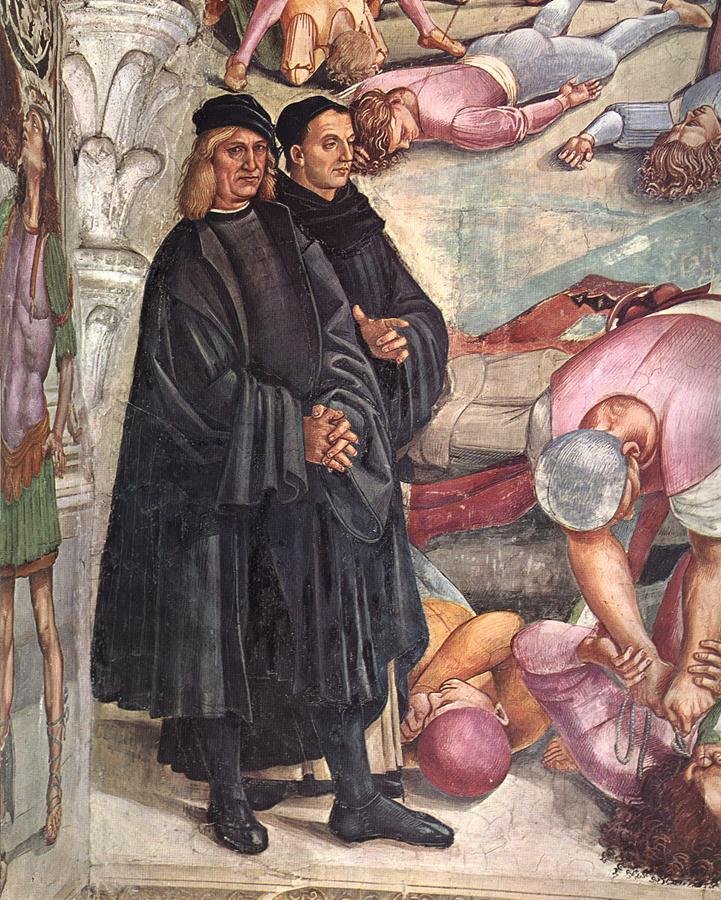
Selfportrait of Luca Signorelli (left) with Fra Angelico

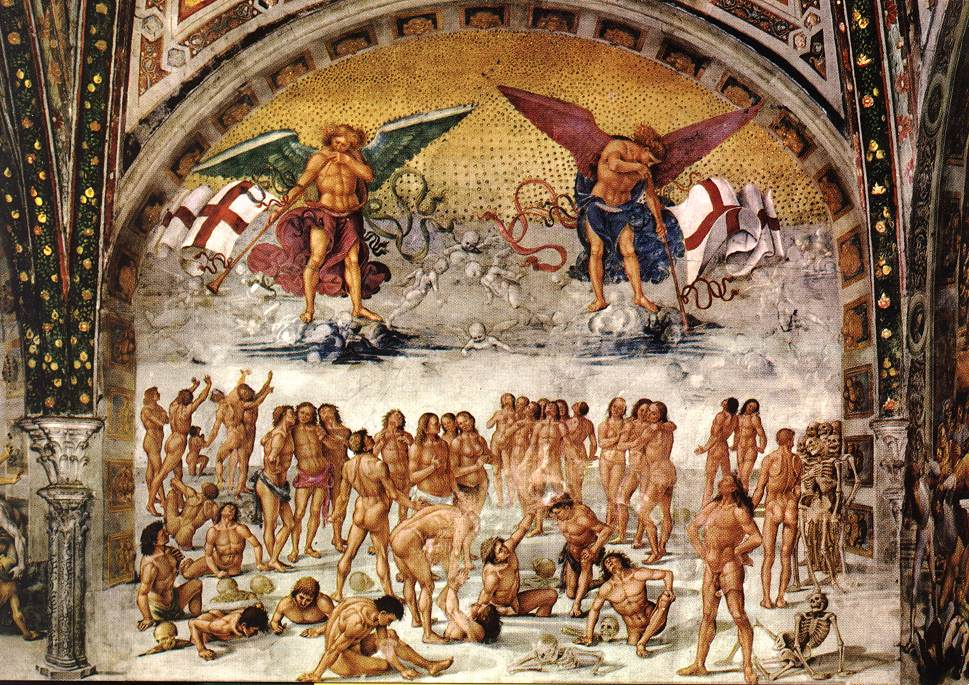
Resurrection of the Flesh (1499–1502), Fresco Chapel of San Brizio, Duomo, Orvieto

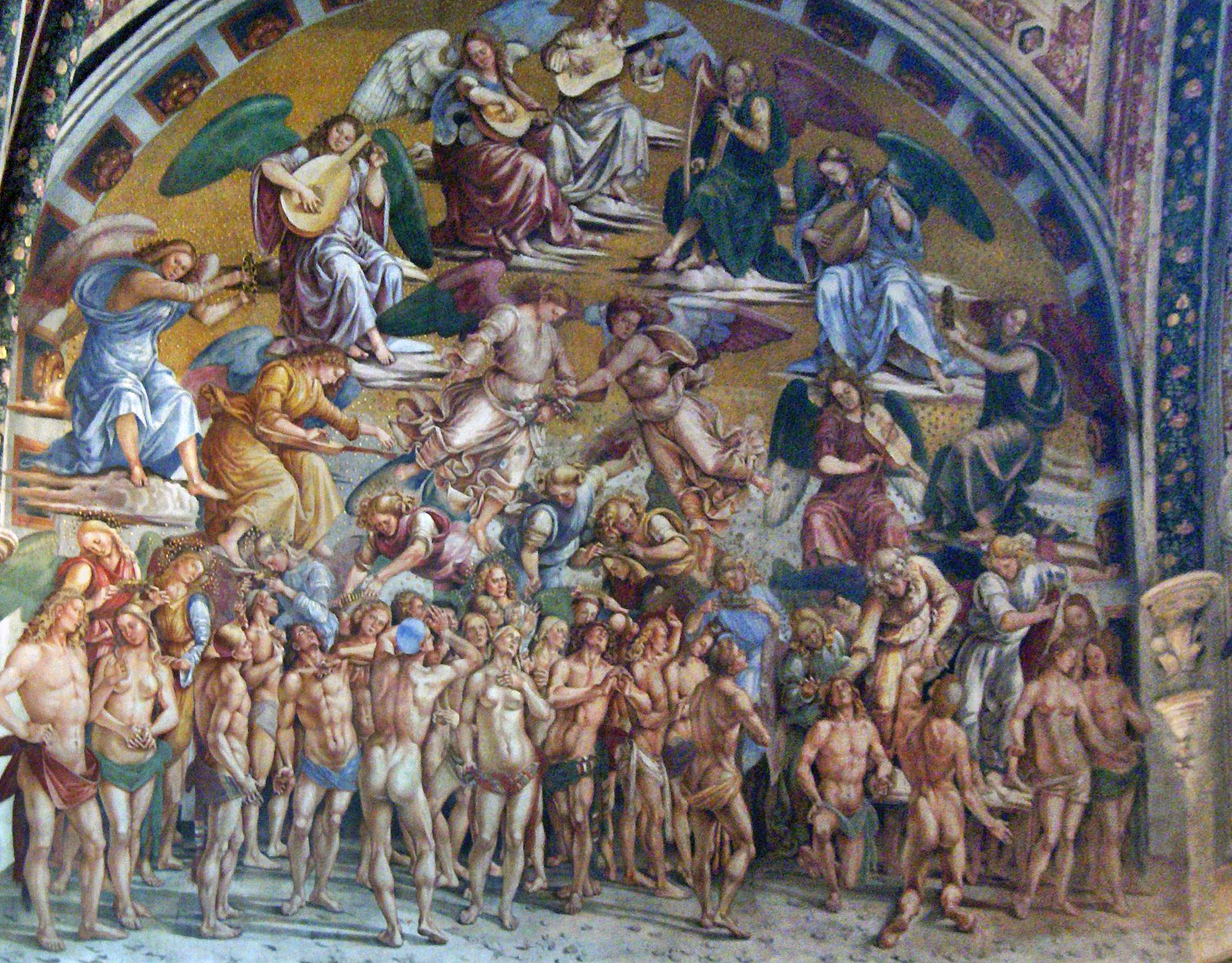
The Elect In Paradise

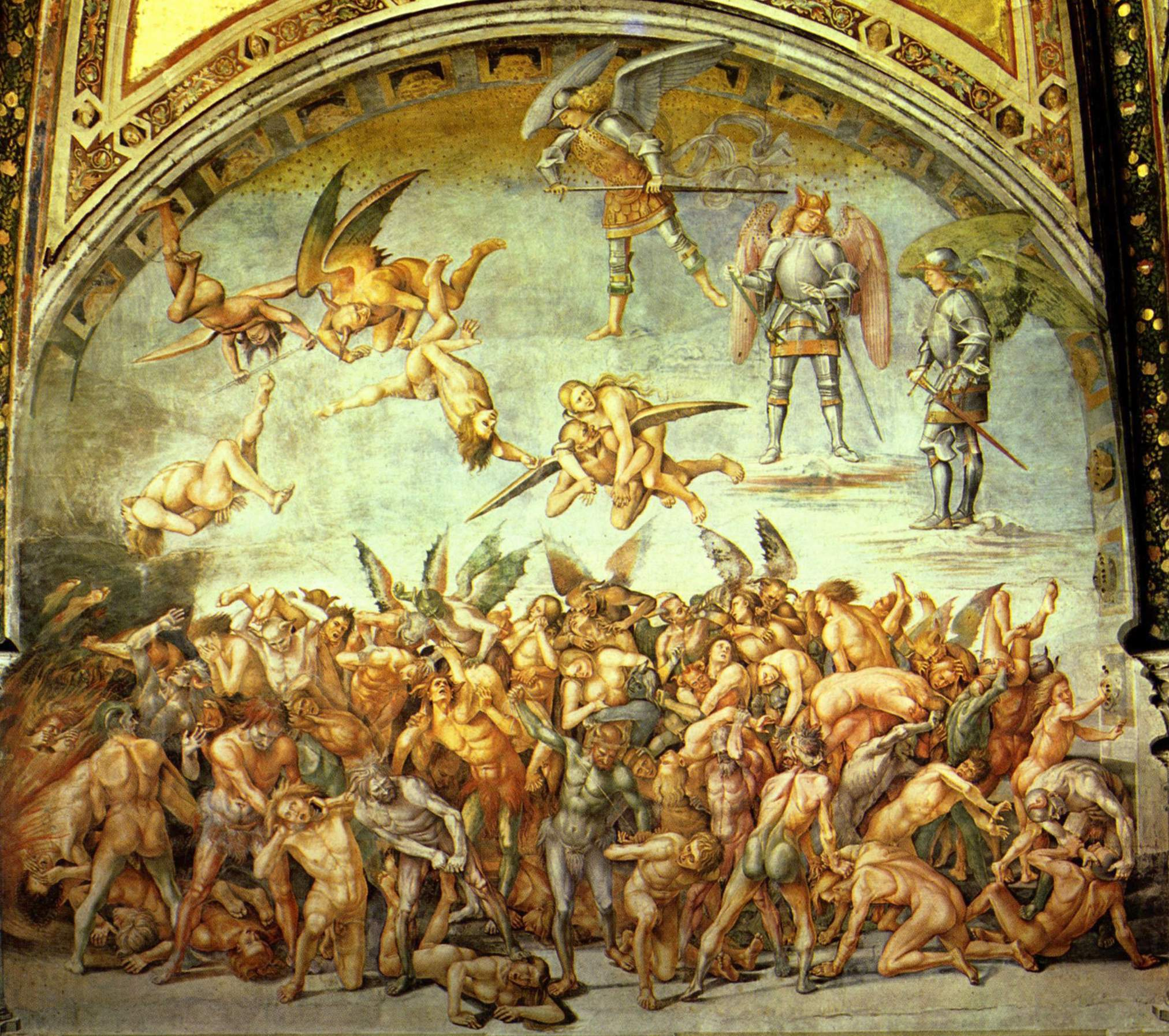
The Damned. 1499–1502. Fresco. Chapel of San Brizio in Orvieto Cathedral.

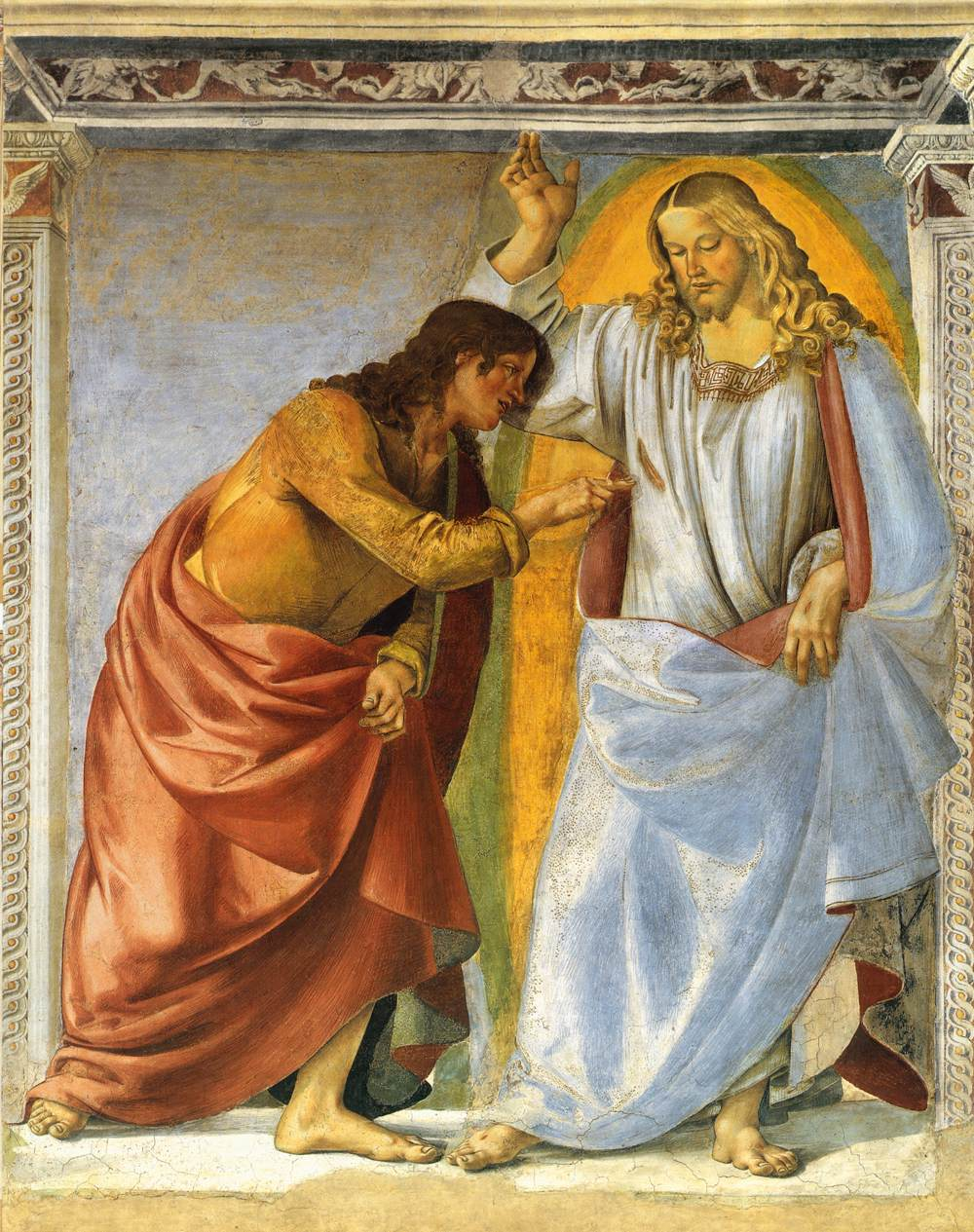
Christ and the Doubting Thomas

== See also ==
- Signorelli parapraxis
