= Giuseppe Arrighi =

Italian painter

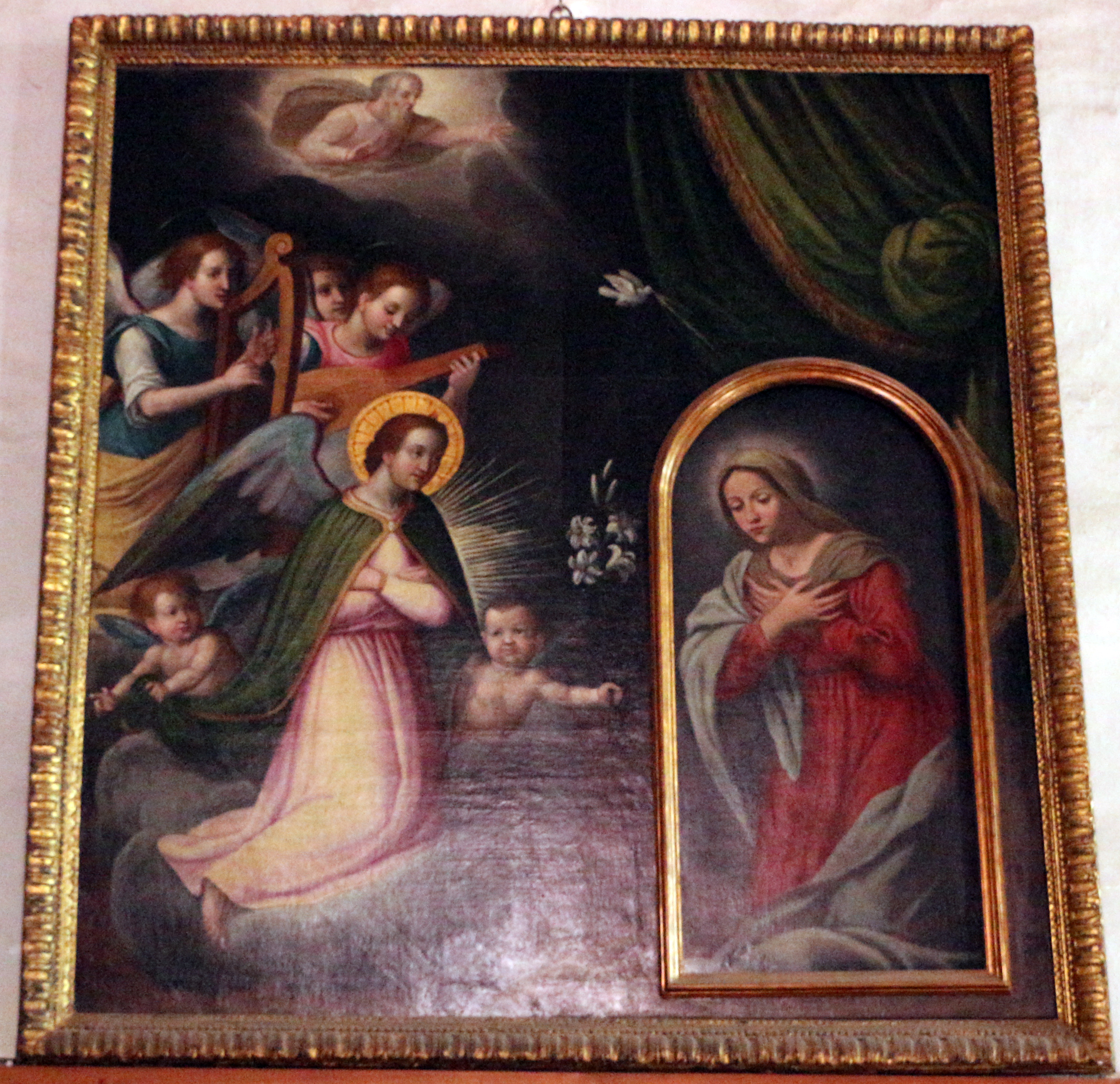
Announcing Angel by Cosimo Daddi, and Virgin Mary by Giuseppe Arrighi

Giuseppe Arrighi (1642–1706) was an Italian painter of the Baroque period.

He was born and died in Volterra. He trained as a pupil of Baldassare Franceschini. Arrighi painted mainly religious works in local churches, including the church of Sant’Andrea, San Pietro, San Francesco, San Giusto, and San Michele. He was buried in the church of the Ospedale. Arrhigi painted an altarpiece of Saints Antonio da Padua, Dominic, Thomas Acquinas, and Francis of Assisi for the Pieve of Santa Maria at Chianni. He also painted a St Anthony of Padua for the Cathedral of Volterra.
