= Virgin Enthroned with Saints (Signorelli) =

1491 painting by Luca Signorelli

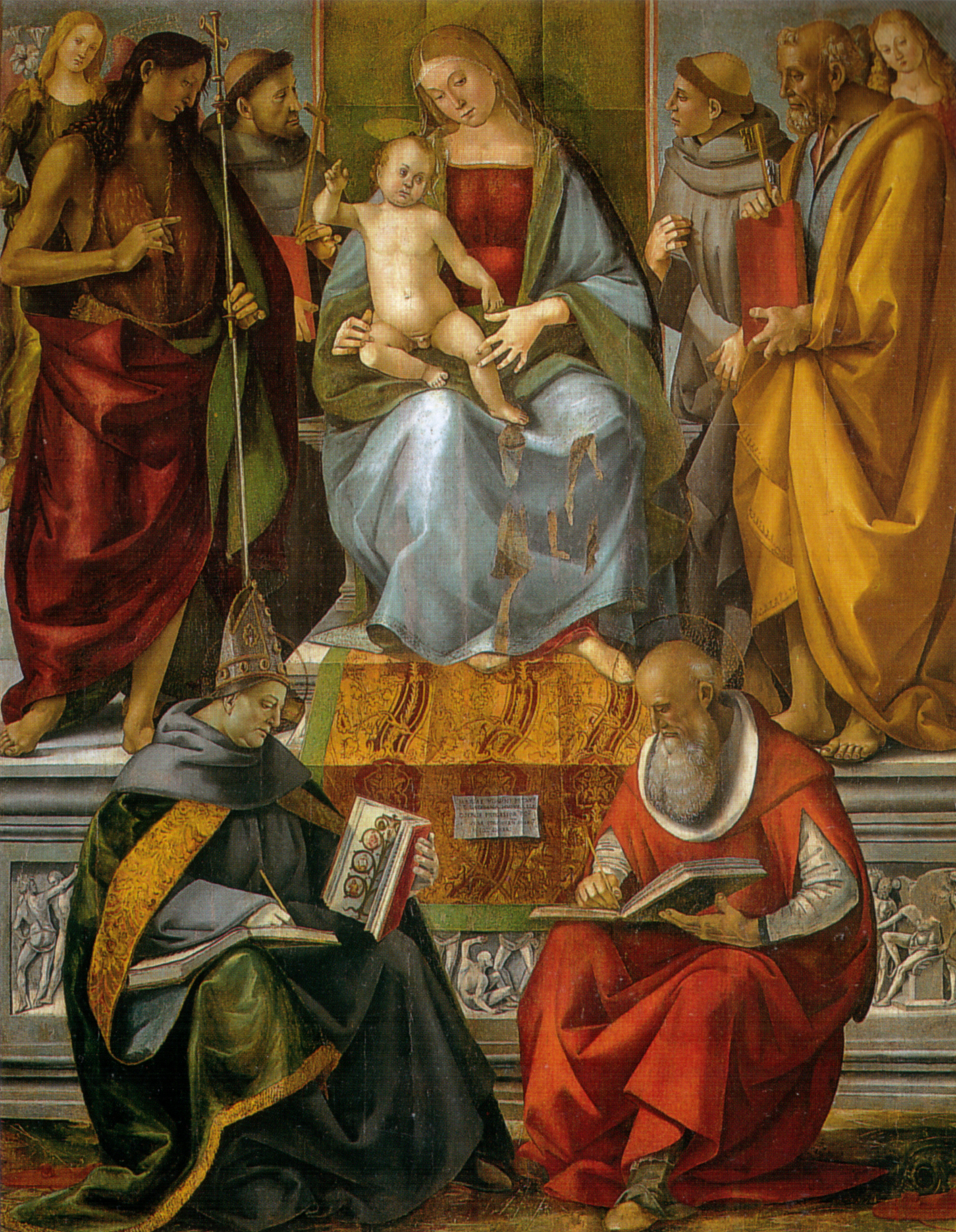
- Artist: Luca Signorelli
- Year: 1491
- Medium: Tempera on panel
- Dimensions: 302 cm × 233 cm (119 in × 92 in)
- Location: Pinacoteca e museo civico di Volterra, Volterra

The Virgin Enthroned with Saints is a painting by the Italian Renaissance artist Luca Signorelli, dated to 1491 and housed in the Pinacoteca Comunale (Municipal Art Gallery) of Volterra, central Italy.

== History ==
In 1490–1492 Signorelli was in Volterra, a city under Florentine control, under the patronage of the House of Medici. Aside from this Madonna, he painted an Annunciation, a Circumcision of Christ and, perhaps, the Portrait of Man.

== Description ==
The panel's subject is a Holy Conversation, inspired by similar works from the Venetian area, such as Antonello da Messina's San Cassiano Altarpiece and its derivations by Giovanni Bellini and others. Similarities include the green canvas hanging behind Mary's throne, continuing in the broccato carpet at her feet. Also of the same origin is the central cartouche with the artist's signature, derived from Flemish painting and introduced in Italy by Paduan artists.

The scene comprises two levels: on the upper one are the Virgin and the blessing Child, with the saints John the Baptist, Peter, perhaps Antony of Padua and Francis, and, at the sides, two small angels. The upper saints (with the exception of St. Peter) are of poorer quality, and were perhaps executed by the artist's workshop. Those in the foreground, which were less hastily painted, are a bishop and St. Jerome sitting and writing. The latter resembles that painted by Domenico Ghirlandaio in the church of Ognissanti at Florence.

A classical element is the frieze with the Centauromachy, which cites a sarcophagus discovered in the early 15th century at Cortona (not far from Volterra).

== Sources ==
- Paolucci, Antonio. "Luca Signorelli". Pittori del Rinascimento. Florence: Scala.
