= Portrait of a Man (Signorelli) =

1492 painting by Luca Signorelli

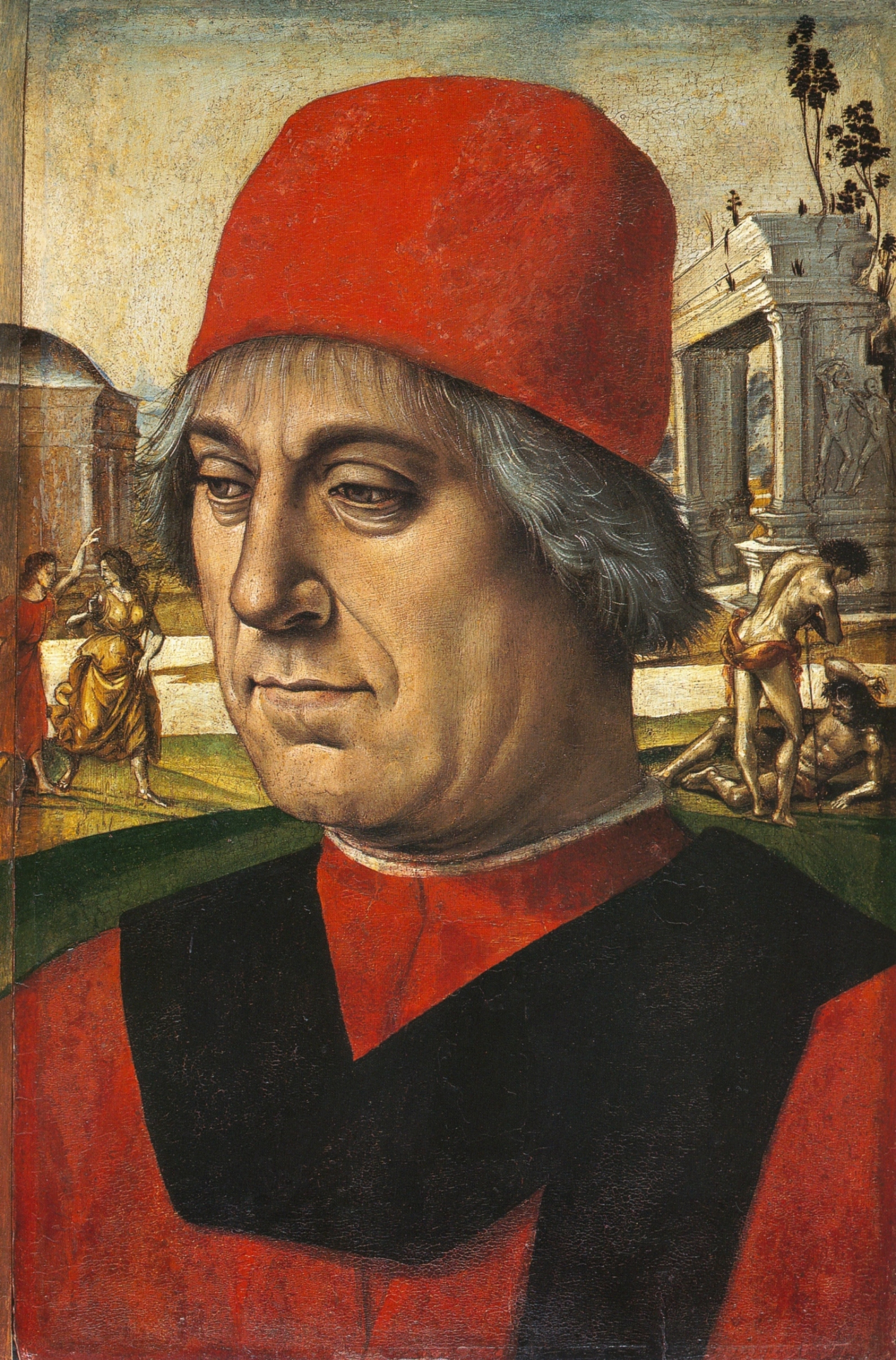
- Artist: Luca Signorelli
- Year: c. 1492
- Medium: Tempera on panel
- Dimensions: 50 cm × 32 cm (20 in × 13 in)
- Location: Gemäldegalerie, Berlin

The Portrait of a Man is a painting by the Italian Renaissance artist Luca Signorelli, dated to c. 1492 and housed in the Gemäldegalerie, Berlin.

The painting was featured in the 1980 BBC Two series 100 Great Paintings.

== History ==
From 1490 to 1492, Signorelli was in Volterra, a city under Florentine control, under the patronage of the House of Medici. Here he painted an Annunciation, a Virgin Enthroned with Saints, a Circumcision of Christ and, perhaps, this painting, attributed to that period for its stylistic resemblance with those works.

== Description ==
The painting portrays an aged man from three-quarters, characterized by white hair and rich bourgeois garments, perhaps those of a jurist, including a red beret and jacket, and a black scarf. The style is inspired to the works of Hans Memling and to some by Domenico Ghirlandaio.

The background houses Roman ruins and some naked men, inspired to those in Piero della Francesca's Death of Adam in San Francesco at Arezzo, and are also in other works by Signorelli, such as the Madonna with Child and Naked Men of the Uffizi.

== Sources ==
- Paolucci, Antonio. "Luca Signorelli". Pittori del Rinascimento. Florence: Scala.
