= Santa Maria a Campi Bisenzio =

Church building in Campi Bisenzio, Italy

Coordinates: 43°49′25.96″N 11°8′8.46″E

Santa Maria
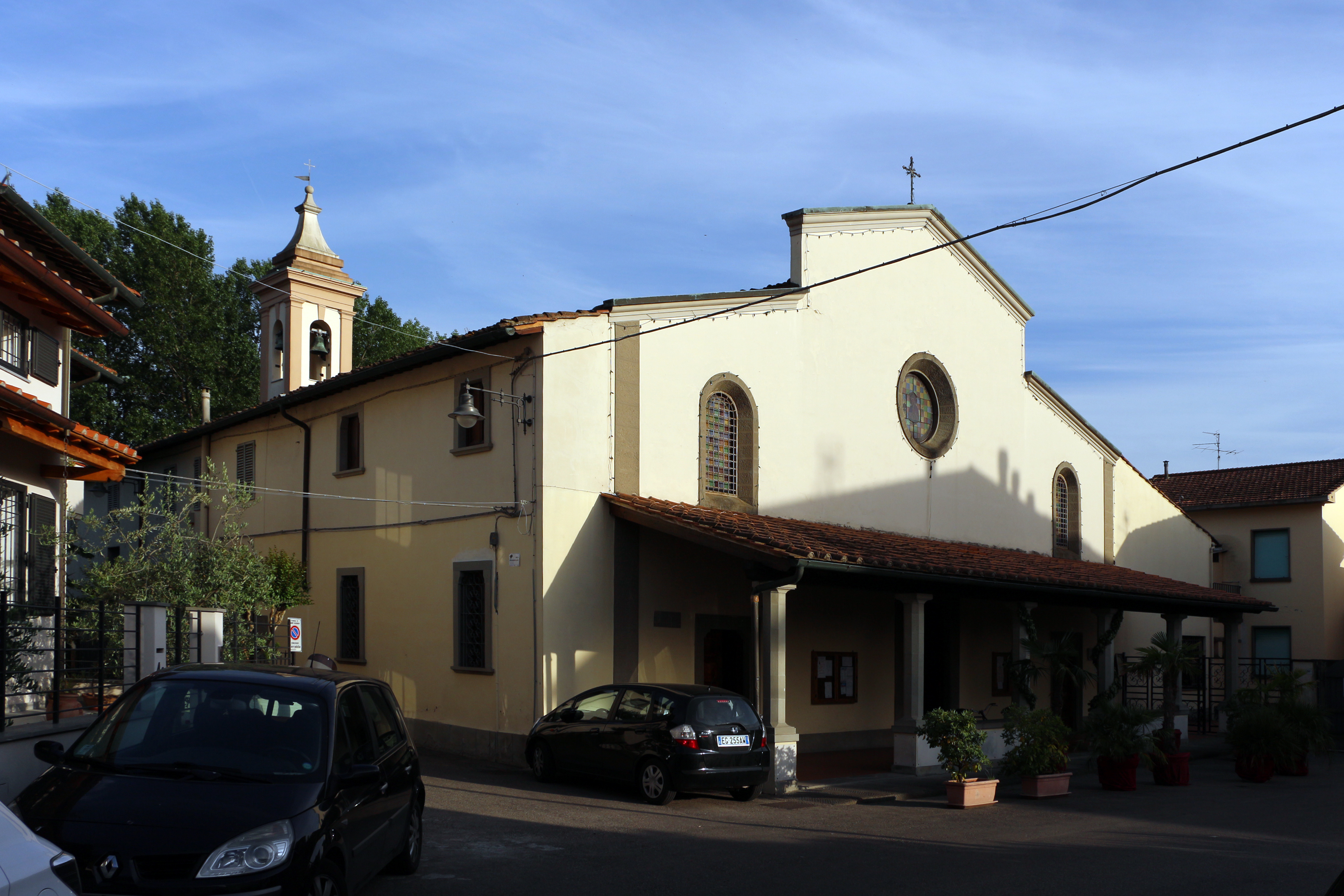
- Facade

Religion
- Affiliation: Roman Catholic

Location
- Location: Campi Bisenzio, province of Florence, Italy
- Interactive map of Santa Maria

Architecture
- Type: Church
- Style: Renaissance-style

Santa Maria or Santa Maria a Campi is a Roman Catholic parish church located on Via Spartaco Lavagnini #26 in Campi Bisenzio, just west of Florence, in the region of Tuscany, Italy.

== History ==
A church at the site was first documented in 1270 or perhaps as early as the 12th century. The church was dedicated to the Assumption of Mary, and built with facade facing west and the apse in the east. It lay on the road from Pistoia to Florence.

The church has undergone reconstructions and expansions over the years. The oldest portions are the apse and its chapels of St James and St Anthony of Padua. The church at some point incorporated a statue of Saint Roch, carved in the 15th century, in search of help for the plague. This led to the formation of a confraternity of St Roch, which built an oratory in what is now the right aisle, but incorporated into the church proper during the 18th century. Also in the 18th century, a new bell-tower was erected next to the apse. A major reconstruction took place during 1953-1962, led by Ferdinando Ghelli. In 1991–1992, the front portico was added.

== Interior ==
To the left of the entrance is a pietra serena altar (1640) designed by Domenico Roti and dedicated to the Madonna del Carmelo. The altar frames a 14th-century fresco of the virgin and Child between St John the Baptist and St Lawrence. The stone choir dates to the second half of the 16th century.

The Chapel of St James was frescoed circa 1430 by Mariotto di Cristofano, brother-in-law of Masaccio. On the chapel ceiling are frescoes depicting the four Evangelists. On the right wall of the Chapel, in the tabernacle is a 15th-century fresco depicting an Enthroned Madonna among the Saint James and St Margaret of Antioch. The fresco and the altar were commissioned by the Cianamelli (today Ciaramelli) family; the church in the past was a stop for pilgrims on the road to Santiago de Compostela. In a wall once belonging to the dining hall of the pilgrim hostel associated with the church, a fresco depicts the Last Supper (circa 1450) attributed to Stefano di Antonio di Vanni.

A painted crucifix (16th-century) is attributed to followers of Benedetto da Maiano. The altar of St Roch has a Madonna of the Assumption with Saints Roch, Agatha, Sebastian and Maria Maddalena dei Pazzi (1625) by Giovanni Gargiolli. The Chapel of the Annunciation has a crucifix attributed to followers of Giambologna. A modern painting of the Annunciation (1993) was painted by Antonio Manzi.
