= God the Son =

Second person of the Trinity in Christian theology

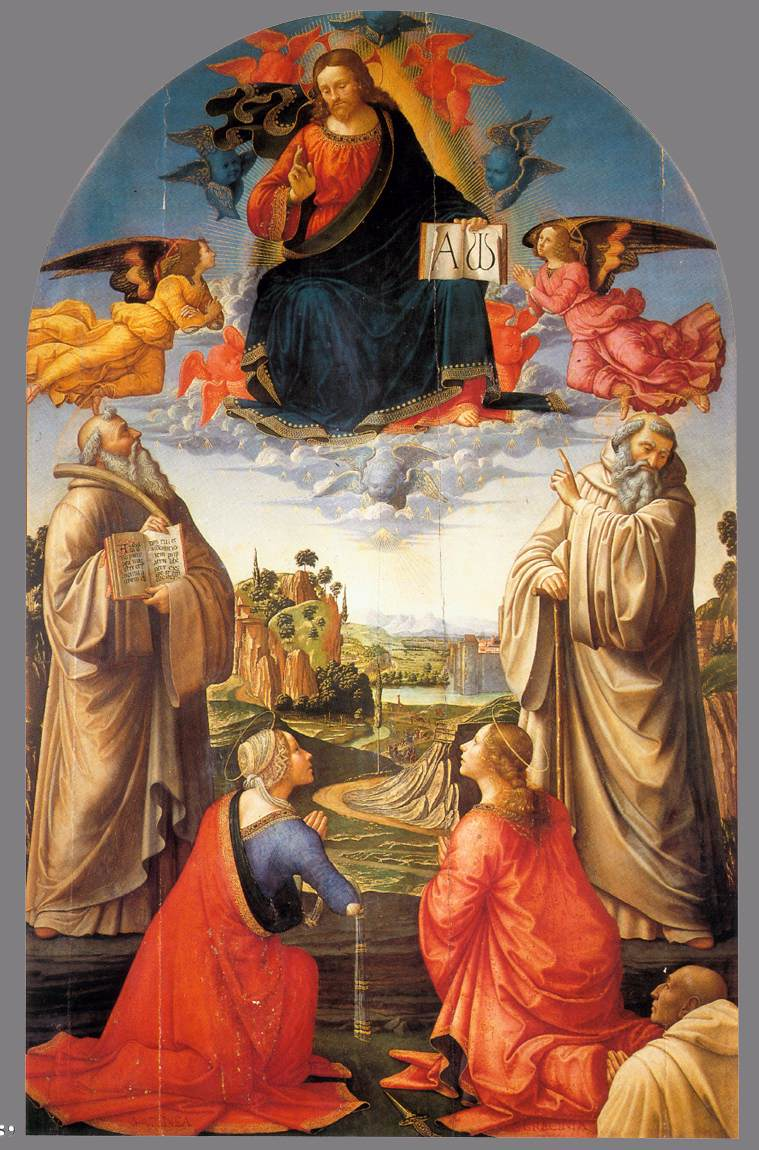
Christ in Glory with Four Saints and a Donor (c. 1492 painting by Ghirlandaio) depicts God the Son seated in Heaven.

God the Son (Greek: Θεὸς ὁ Υἱός, Latin: Deus Filius) or God the Word (Greek: Θεὸς ὁ Λόγος, Latin: Deus Verbum) is the second Person of the Trinity in Christian theology. According to mainstream Christian doctrine, God the Son, in the form of Jesus Christ, is the incarnation of the eternal, pre-existent divine Logos (Koine Greek for "word") through whom all things were created. Although the precise term "God the Son" does not appear in the Bible, it serves as a theological designation expressing the understanding of Jesus as the second person of the Trinity, distinct yet united in essence with God the Father and God the Holy Spirit (the first and third persons of the Trinity respectively).

The Son is the radiance of God’s glory and the exact representation of His being, sustaining all things by His powerful Word. After He had provided purification for sins, He sat down at the right hand of the Majesty in heaven.

— Hebrews 1:3

== Sources ==
The phrase "God the Son" does not appear in the Bible but is found in later Christian writings. It mistakenly appears in a medieval manuscript, MS No.1985, where Galatians 2:20 has "Son of God" changed to "God the Son".

In English, this term comes from Latin usage, as seen in the Athanasian Creed and other early church texts. In Greek, "God the Son" is written as ho Theos ho huios (ὁ Θεός ὁ υἱός), which is different from ho huios tou Theou (ὁ υἱός τοῦ Θεοῦ), meaning "Son of God". In Latin, "God the Son" is Deus Filius. This term appears in the Athanasian Creed: Et tamen non tres omnipotentes, sed unus omnipotens. Ita Deus Pater, Deus Filius, Deus [et] Spiritus Sanctus, which means "So the Father is God, the Son is God, and the Holy Spirit is God", distinguishing it from filius Dei, meaning "son of God".

== Usage ==
The term deus filius is used in the Athanasian Creed and formulas such as Deus Pater, Deus Filius, Deus Spiritus Sanctus: Et non tres Dii, sed unus est Deus.

The term is used by Augustine of Hippo in his On the Trinity, for example in discussion of the Son's obedience to God the Father: deo patri deus filius obediens; and in Sermon 90 on the New Testament: "2. For hold this fast as a firm and settled truth, if you would continue Catholics, that God the Father begot God the Son without time, and made Him of a Virgin in time."

The Augsburg Confession (1530) adopted the phrase as Gott der Sohn.

Jacques Forget (1910) in the Catholic Encyclopedia article "Holy Ghost" notes that "Among the apologists, Athenagoras mentions the Holy Ghost along with, and on the same plane as, the Father and the Son. 'Who would not be astonished', says he (A Plea for the Christians 10), 'to hear us called atheists, us who confess God the Father, God the Son and the Holy Ghost, and hold them one in power and distinct in order.' "

== New Testament ==
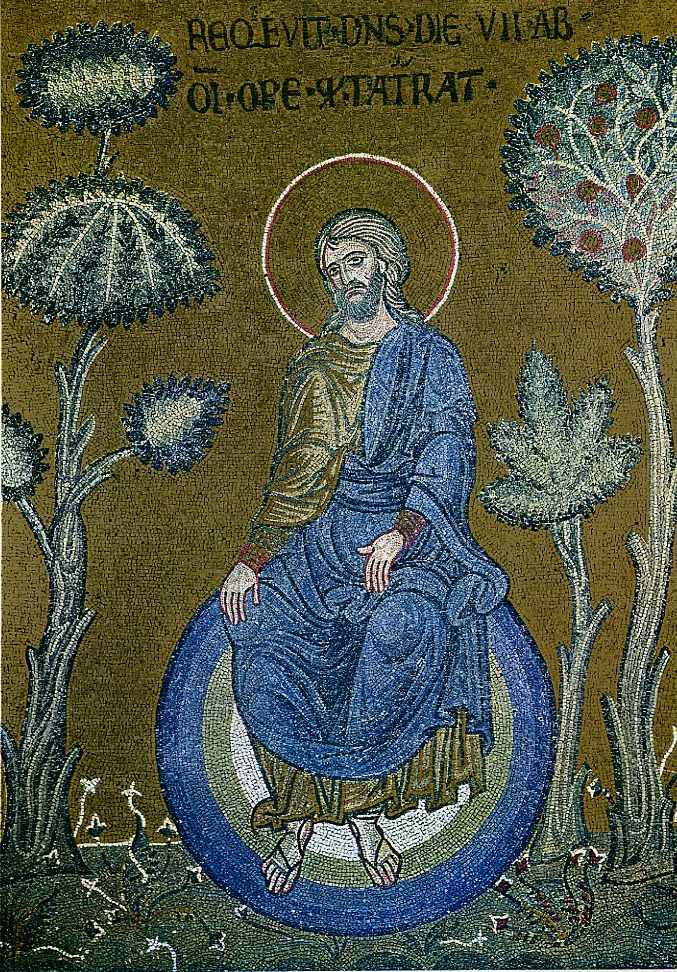
God resting after creation (Byzantine mosaic in Monreale, Sicily) depicts Christ, the Logos, as the creator of the world

"Son of God" is used to refer to Jesus in the Gospel of Mark at the beginning in verse 1:1 and at its end in 15:39. Max Botner wrote, "Indeed, if Mark 1:1 presents the "normative understanding" of Jesus' identity, then it makes a significant difference what the text includes".

The Logos or Word in John 1:1 ("In the beginning was the Word, and the Word was with God, and the Word was God), is often interpreted, especially by Trinitarians, to identify the pre-existent Jesus with this Word.

The disputed Comma Johanneum (1 John 5:7) includes the Son in the formula "For there are three that bear witness in heaven: the Father, the Word, and the Holy Spirit; and these three are one."

Christians believe that Jesus is the only begotten Son of God (John 3:16). Jesus identified himself in New Testament canonical writings. "Jesus said to them, 'Most assuredly, I say to you, before Abraham was, I AM.'" (John 8:58), which some Trinitarians believe is a reference to Moses in his interaction with preincarnate God in the Old Testament: "And God said to Moses, 'I am that I am.' And he said, "Thus you shall say to the children of Israel, 'I AM has sent me to you.'" (Exodus 3:14).

A manuscript variant in John 1:18 (Θεὸν οὐδεὶς ἑώρακεν πώποτε· μονογενὴς Θεὸς ὁ ὢν εἰς τὸν κόλπον τοῦ Πατρὸς, ἐκεῖνος ἐξηγήσατο) has led to translations including "God the One and Only" (NIV, 1984) referring to the Son.

Later theological use of this expression (compare Latin: Deus Filius) reflects what came to be the standard interpretation of New Testament references, understood to imply Jesus' divinity, but with the distinction of his person from another person of the Trinity called the Father. As such, the title is associated more with the development of the doctrine of the Trinity. Trinitarians believe that a clear reference to the Trinity occurs in Matthew 28:19, "Go, therefore, and make disciples of all nations, baptizing them in the name of the Father, and of the Son, and of the Holy Spirit."

== Dissenting views ==
Groups of both trinitarian and nontrinitarian Christians reject the term "God the Son" to describe Jesus Christ. For example, Jehovah's Witnesses reject the concept along with the word Trinity as extrabiblical terminology.

Oneness Pentecostals, who affirm his divinity, object to the term as an unauthorized reversal of the language of Scripture which describes him 40 times as the "Son of God."

While most mainstream Christian denominations hold God the Son to be "begotten of [...] the substance of" God the Father, and therefore a divine person of the one Being who is God, the Church of Jesus Christ of Latter-day Saints holds that God the Father, God the Son, and God the Holy Ghost are in fact three separate beings. This is not to be confused with the Reorganized Church of Jesus Christ of Latter-day Saints, which does maintain the one-ness of the trinity.

== See also ==
- Divi filius
- Names and titles of Jesus in the New Testament
- Sons of God
- Filioque
