= Oratorio della Madonna del Gabellino, Volterra =

Chapel in Volterra

The Oratorio della Madonna del Gabellino (Oratory of the Madonna of the Tariff or also known as the Oratory or Chapel of San Felice) is an ancient chapel or oratory located on Via Santa Felice, just north of the interior of Porta San Felice in Volterra, province of Pisa, region of Tuscany, Italy.

This small and simple chapel was erected in 1707 by the neighbors of the zone, perhaps for those involved in collecting tariffs for merchants entering the town, or as chapel for those leaving town. The main altarpiece has a depiction of the Madonna and Child, revered as the Madonna dei Gabellieri by Giuseppe Arrighi. Also in the altar is a depiction of St Francis of Paola by Ippolito Cigna.

From the facade, you can look down at the Fonti di San Felice, a spring fed fountain within the city walls. A church dedicated to St Felix was once located nearby.
