= Sant'Andrea a San Donnino =

Church in Tuscany, Italy

Coordinates: 43°47′43.2″N 11°9′01.4″E

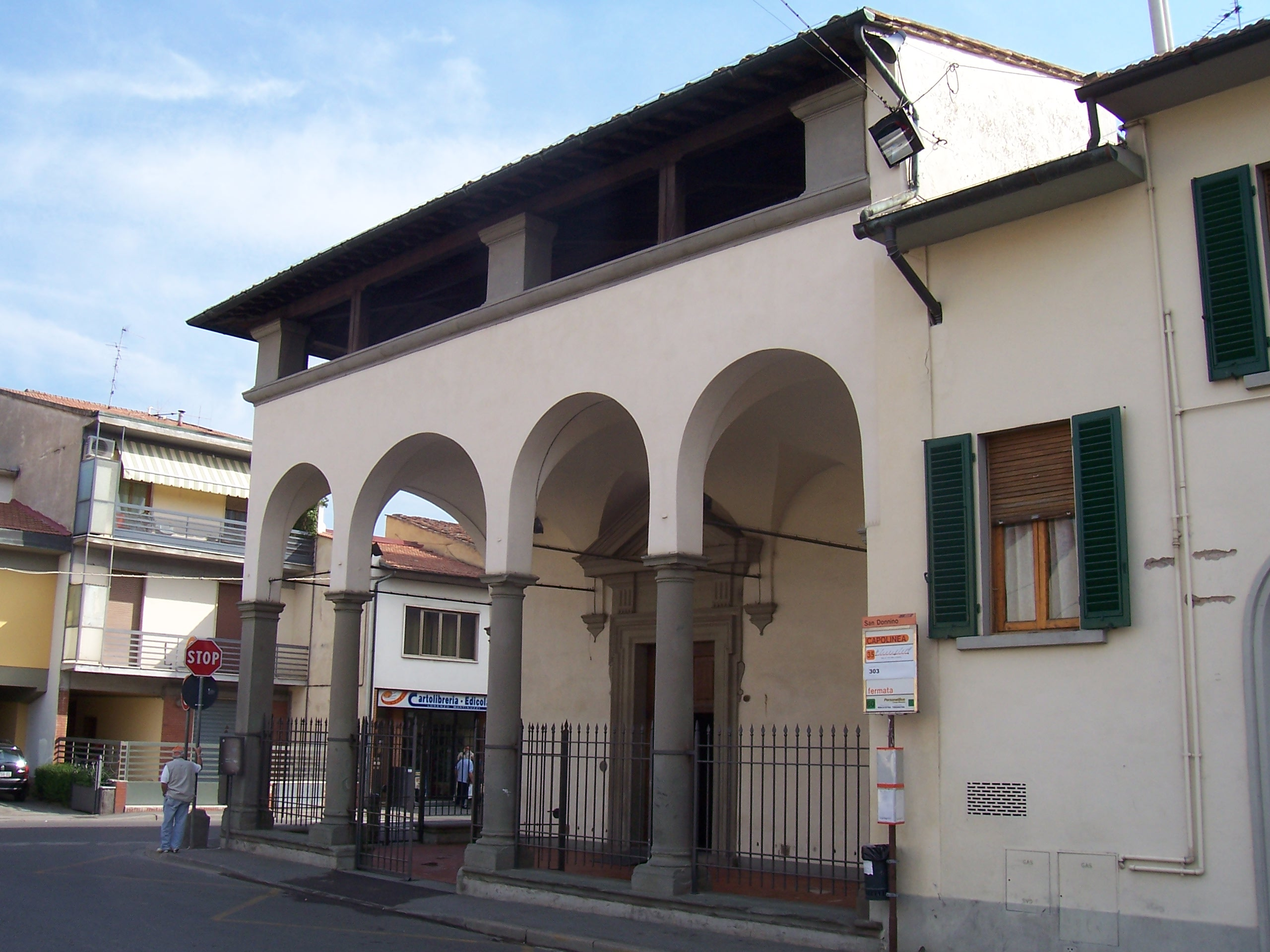
- Facade

Religion
- Affiliation: Roman Catholic

Location
- Location: Campi Bisenzio, province of Florence, Italy
- Interactive map of Sant'Andrea a San Donnino

Architecture
- Type: Church
- Style: Renaissance-style

Sant'Andrea a San Donnino is a Roman Catholic parish church in the San Donnino neighborhood of the town limits of Campi Bisenzio, located on the Via Pistoiese just west of Florence, in the region of Tuscany, Italy. Adjacent to the church is a small art Museum.

== History ==
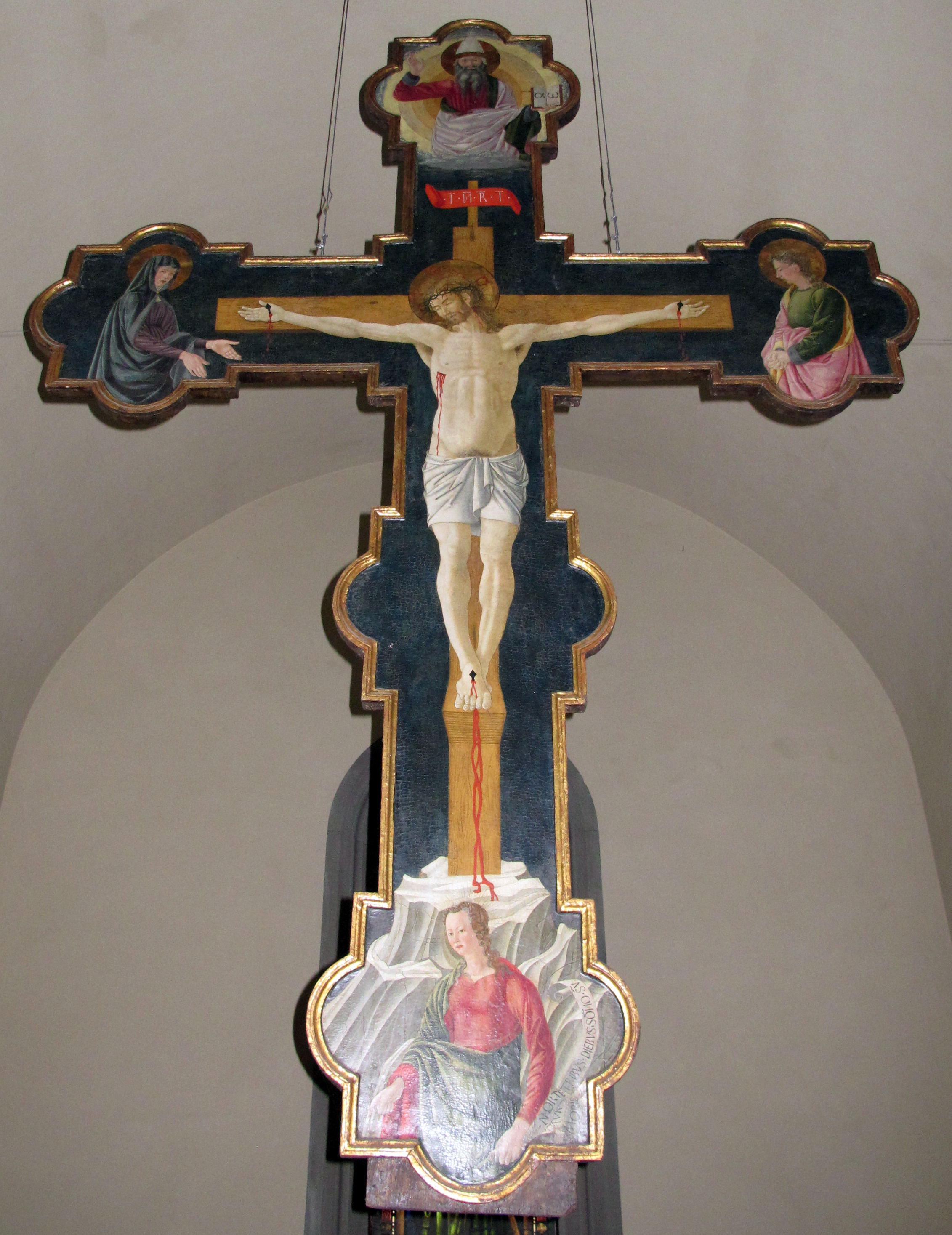
Crucifix at main altar by Giovanni di Francesco del Cervelliera

A church at the site was erected in the 11th century along the route linking Florence to Pistoia. The church was dedicated to St Andrew the apostle. The first documentation we have of the building are from 1276, and until the 18th-century, the church was subsidiary to the parish of San Martino a Brozzi.

A major reconstruction occurred in 1365; however, the church underwent a number of refurbishments over the centuries under the patronage of the Mazzinghi and Tornaquinci families. The church was once surrounded by an orchard. In the 19th century the facade loggia was re-erected. But by 1919, the church was used as a warehouse for agricultural products. In 1934, the church restoration began under the engineer Alfredo Barbacchi. During World War II, the bell-tower was razed, damaging the rear of the church. The church suffered during the 1966 flood of the Arno; this led to the removal of many of the works of art, including frescoes to the adjacent museum. To add to the injury, the bell-tower and walls were affected by an accidental fire on 5 April 1979.

The interior of the church is more sparse now with some of the works moved to the Museo di Arte Sacra di San Donnino a Campi Bisenzio, located in the adjacent cloister.

== Artworks ==
The holy water font (15th) century is sculpted in marble. The baptismal font is modern. A wall altar with a stone arch has 15th-century frescoes of the Baptism by Davide Ghirlandaio and a Madonna and Saints by Domenico Ghirlandaio. The main tabernacle dates from the 15th-century. The main altar was a painted 15th-century crucifix by Giovanni di Francesco. A door on the right opens to the sacristy. On the right wall is a 15th-century triptych, depicting an Annuciation with Saints Eustache and Anthony Abbott by the school of Dal Ponte. The museum displays the 15th-century stone pulpit. An altarpiece depiction God the Father with Angels (1480) and an Enthroned Madonna and Child by Giovanni Botticini. A fresco depicts Saints Sigismond and Albert (1520) attributed to the school of Raffaellino del Garbo. The museum also has a Madonna of the Rosary with Saints attributed to Matteo Rosselli.
