= San Michele Arcangelo, Volterra =

Church building in Volterra, Italy

Coordinates: 43.4026°N 10.8617°E

San Michele Arcangelo
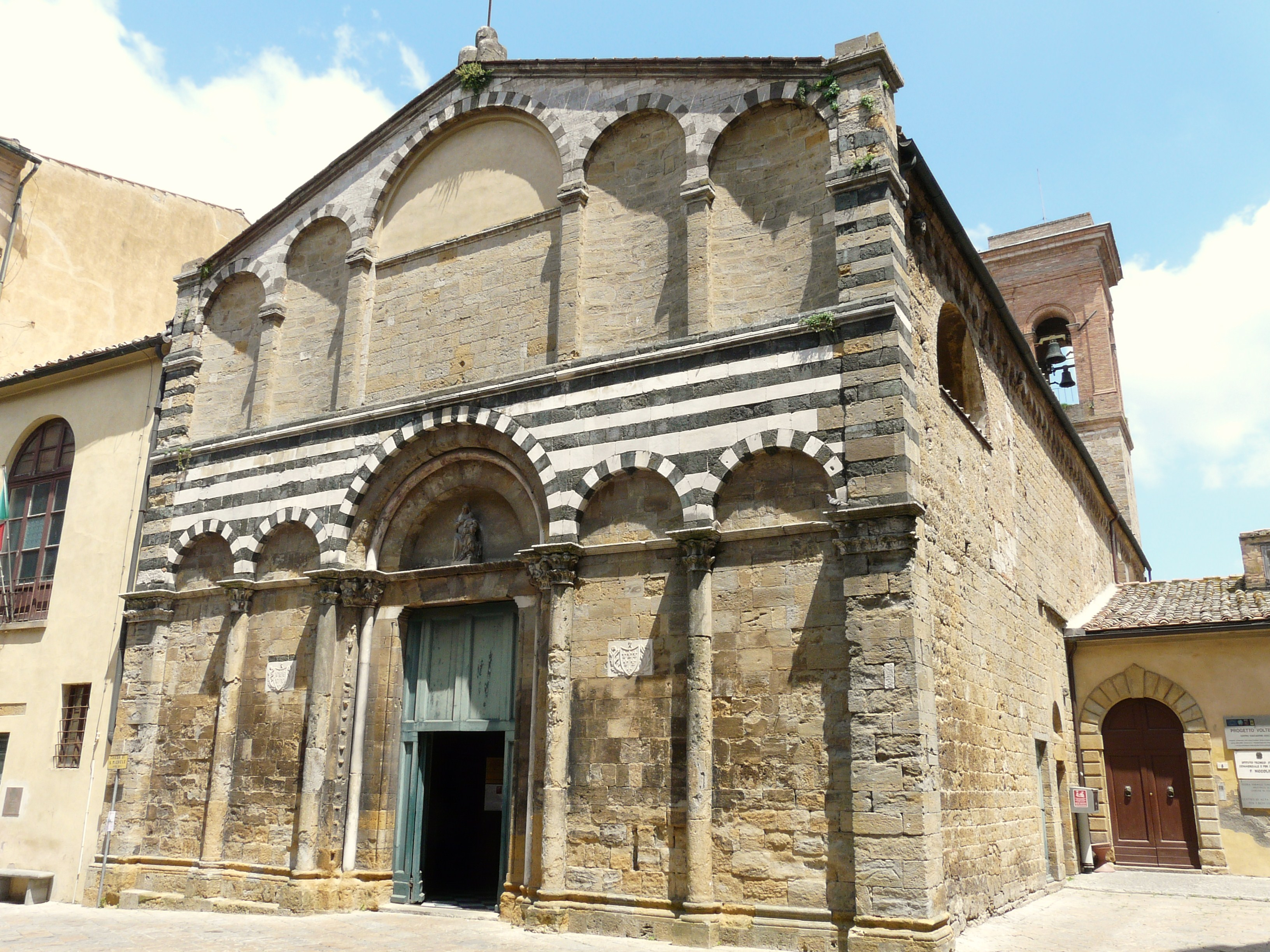

Religion
- Affiliation: Roman Catholic
- Province: Pisa, Tuscany, Italy

Location
- Location: Volterra, Italy
- Interactive map of San Michele Arcangelo

Architecture
- Type: Church
- Style: Romanesque facade.
- Completed: 1285 (facade)

San Michele Arcangelo (St Michele Archangel) is a 13th-century Romanesque-style Roman Catholic church located on Via Guarnacci #6 in Volterra, province of Pisa, region of Tuscany, Italy. The church is across the street from the Medieval Palazzo Maffei-Guarnacci (Casa Torre Toscano).

== History ==
While documentation dates a church on the site to the 10th century, the Romanesque facade of the church, partially embellished with marble and pietra dura striations, dates to around 1285. In the arches are reliefs with the heraldic symbols of the Farnese family. The statue of the Madonna over the portal is a copy of a 14th-century original now in the Museum of Sacred Art.

Those expecting the interior to continue in the exterior style will be disappointed. The interior was completely modified in the 1820s by the order of the Scolopi, which had owned the church since 1711. The presbytery still contains a marble tabernacle by a 15th-century Florentine Balsimelli di Settignano. It includes a Madonna and child terracotta by Giovanni della Robbia and a wood panel of The Guardian Angel by Nicolò Circignani. Along the nave are altars with paintings, including a canvas depicting the Holy Family by Carlo Maratta and a Madonna of the Redemption, which is a 15th-century fresco transferred to canvas attributed to Cenni di Francesco (Cenni di Francesco di ser Cenni). There is also a painting of San Giuseppe Calasanzio by Giuseppe Zocchi.

In the oratory of Saint Christopher, there is a fresco of the Madonna and child, attributed to Vincenzo Tamagni.

== Sources ==
- Civic Tourist Site
- Italian Wikipedia entry
