= Jacopo di Michele =

Italian painter

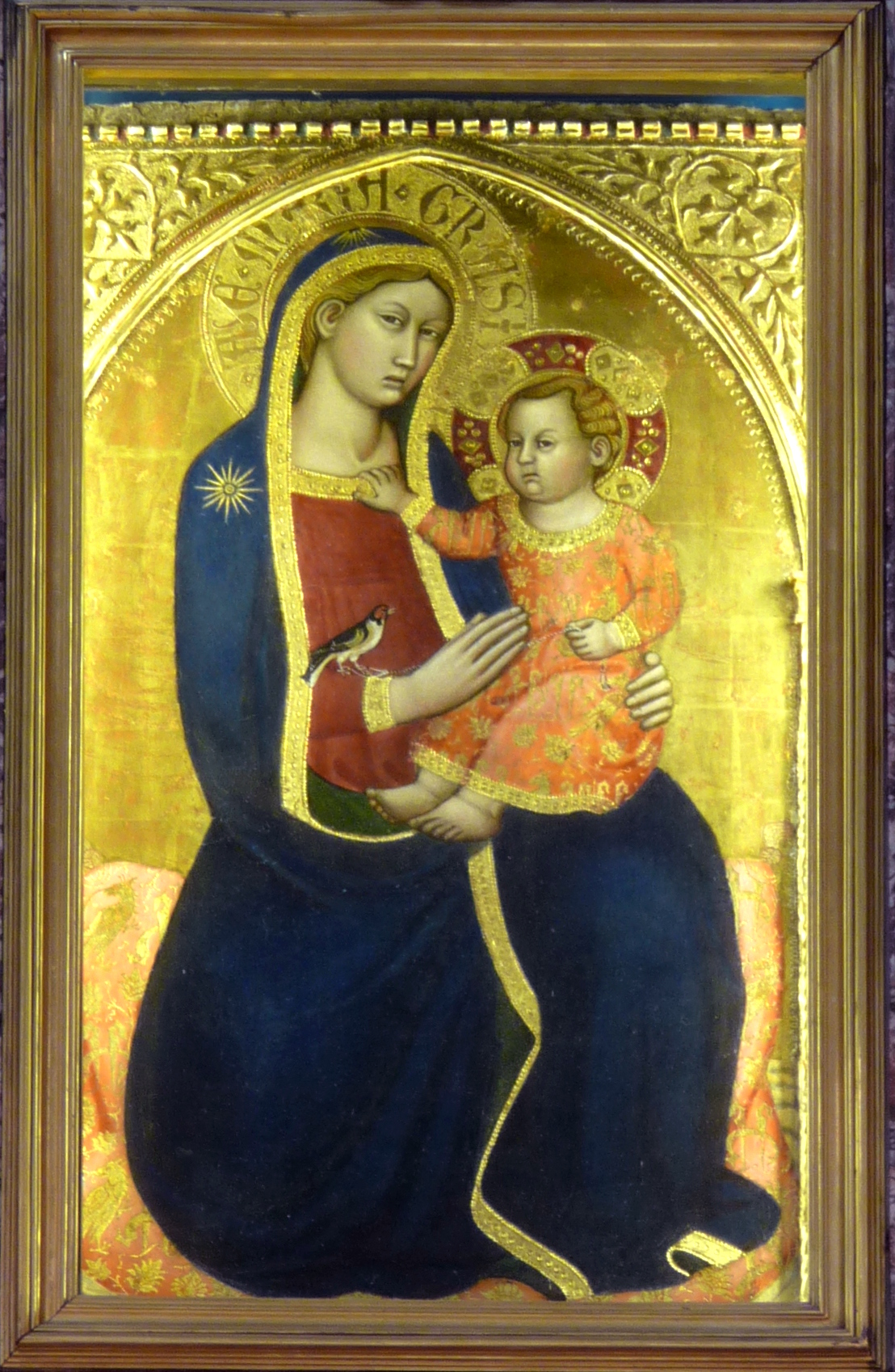
Madonna di Montenero

Jacopo di Michele, also called Jacopo Gera, Iacopo di Michele, or Gera da Pisa is a 14th-century painter, active mainly in Pisa and elsewhere in Tuscany, in a Gothic style. His activity is documented from 1361 to 1395. He is the brother of Getto di Jacopo

A list of attributed works includes:

- Flagellation of Christ, with Saints and Donors, private owner Rome
- Madonna and Child, Sanctuary of Montenero, Livorno.
- St Agatha, Galleria Regionale della Sicilia Palazzo Abatellis, Palermo.
- Enthroned Madonna and Child with St Francis and Anthony Abbot, Museo Nazionale di San Matteo, Pisa
- Enthroned Madonna and Child, Pieve dei SS. Giovanni ed Ermolao, Calci.
- Triptych: St Anne, Madonna and Jesus Child; St John the Evangelist, and San Giacomo Maggiore; Museo Diocesano, Palermo
- Flagellation of Christ with Saints, Church of Santa Maria Novella in Montopoli in Val d'Arno.
- Crucifixion, Church of Santa Maria Novella in Montopoli in Val d'Arno.
- Mystical Marriage of St Catherine of Alexandria with St Lucy, Pinacoteca e museo civico di Volterra.
