= San Francesco, Volterra =

Church in Volterra, Italy

San Francesco
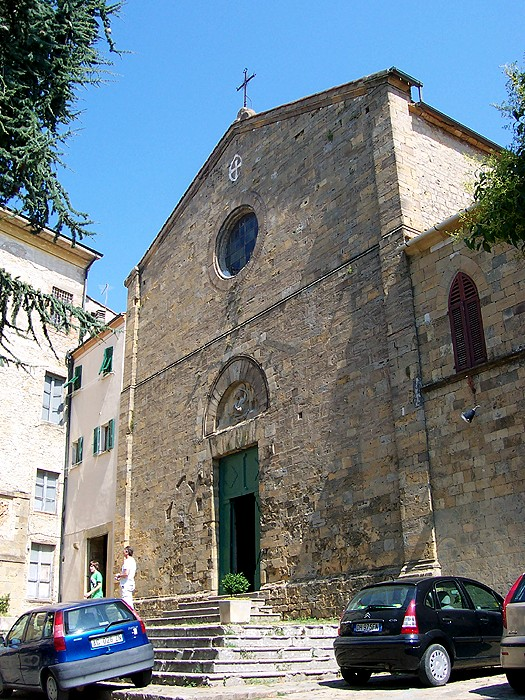

Religion
- Affiliation: Roman Catholic
- Province: Pisa

Location
- Location: Volterra, Italy
- Interactive map of San Francesco
- Coordinates: 43.40442°N 10.85605°E

Architecture
- Type: Church
- Style: Gothic
- Groundbreaking: 13th century

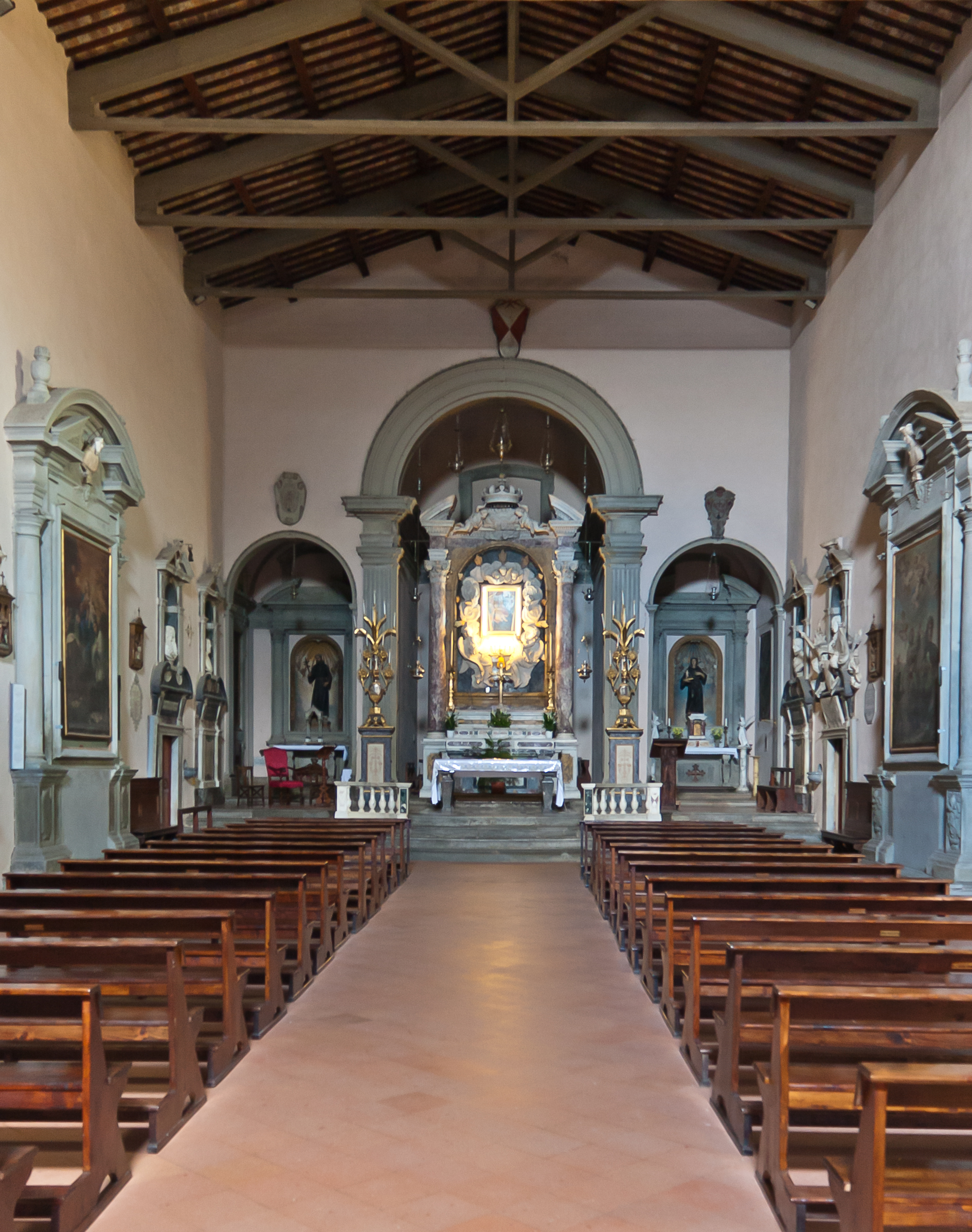
San Francesco

The church of San Francesco is a Gothic-style, Roman Catholic church in Volterra in the province of Pisa, region of Tuscany, Italy.

== Description ==
The plain stone church was granted in 1251 for a community of Franciscan friars. The interior has marble monuments to members of the aristocratic family of Counts Guidi, who were patrons of the order. The monument to Bishop Jacopo Guidi (1588) was designed by Felice Palma.

Above the main altar, now enclosed in a baroque marble frame consisting of clouds, putti, and angels, is an early 14th century painted icon depicting a Madonna and Child. The venerated image of the Madonna di San Sebastiano was moved here from the no longer extant church of San Sebastiano.

Among the paintings in the side altars flanking the nave is a Madonna of the Immaculate Conception and Saints with Adam and Eve (1585) by Giovanni Battista Naldini, a Nativity (1591) by Giovanni Balducci, a Crucifixion attributed to Bartolomeo Neroni, and a Crucifixion (1602) painted by Cosimo Daddi. There is an altarpiece depicting the "Miracle of San Francesco di Paola crossing the Straits of Messina on his Mantle" (1711) by Alessandro Gherardini. The baptismal font was sculpted by Giovanni Battista Bava in 1552. The sacristy had a painting depicting Adoration of the Magi by Ignazio Hugford and a Nativity by Vincenzo Ferretti.

Two paintings are no longer in the church: the Circumcision of Christ (1490-91) by Luca Signorelli and the stunning masterpiece of the Deposition (1521) by Rosso Fiorentino; the former is in the National Gallery of London, while the latter has been moved to the Pinacoteca Civica of Volterra.

== Chapel of the Daily Cross (Cappella della Croce di Giorno) ==
This Gothic-style chapel was built in 1315 by architect Mone Todirigi for a confraternity (Compagnia della Croce di Giorno). It was decorated in 1410 with frescos by Cenni di Francesco and Jacopo da Firenze with scenes from the Legends of the True Cross. These frescoes were inspired by those of Agnolo Gaddi in the Santa Croce of Florence, and the Golden Legend of Jacobus de Voragine.

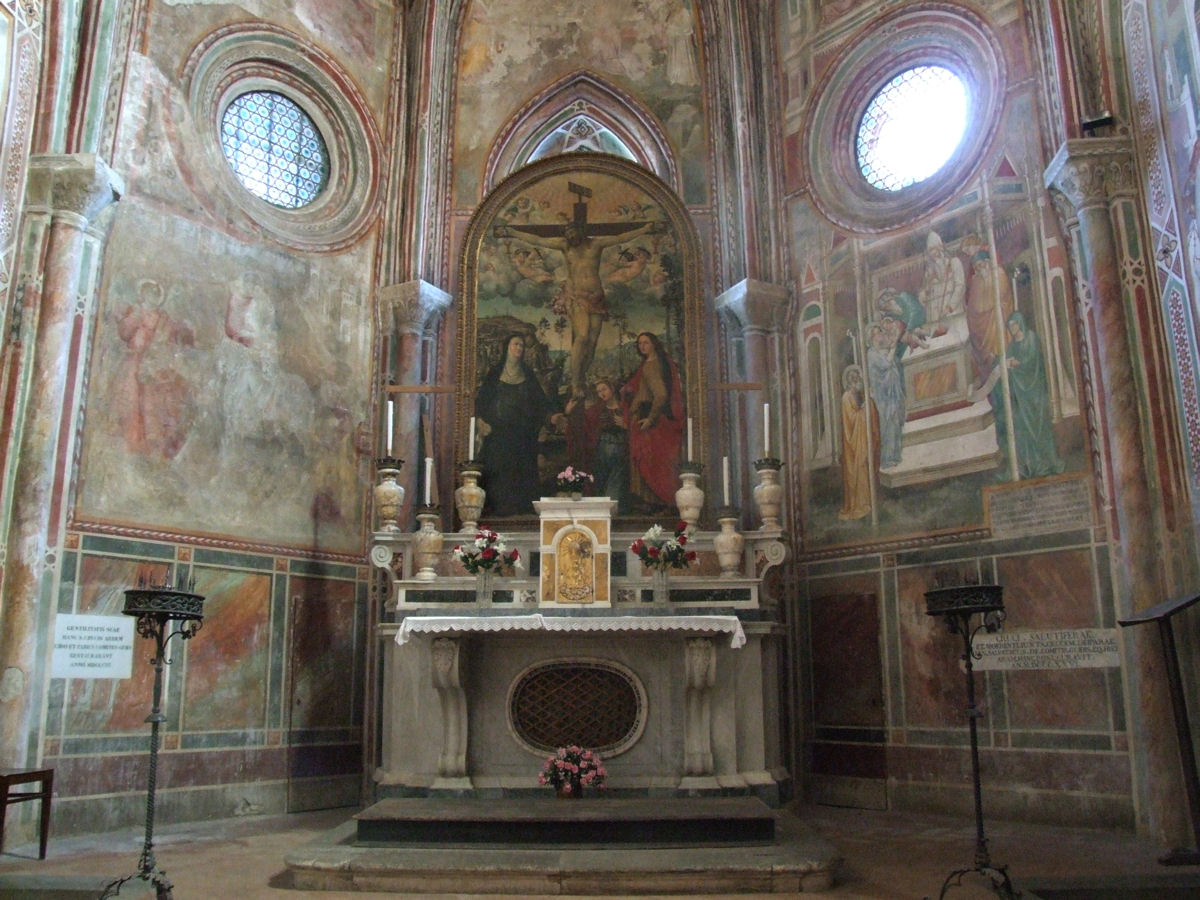
Capella della Croce di Giorno

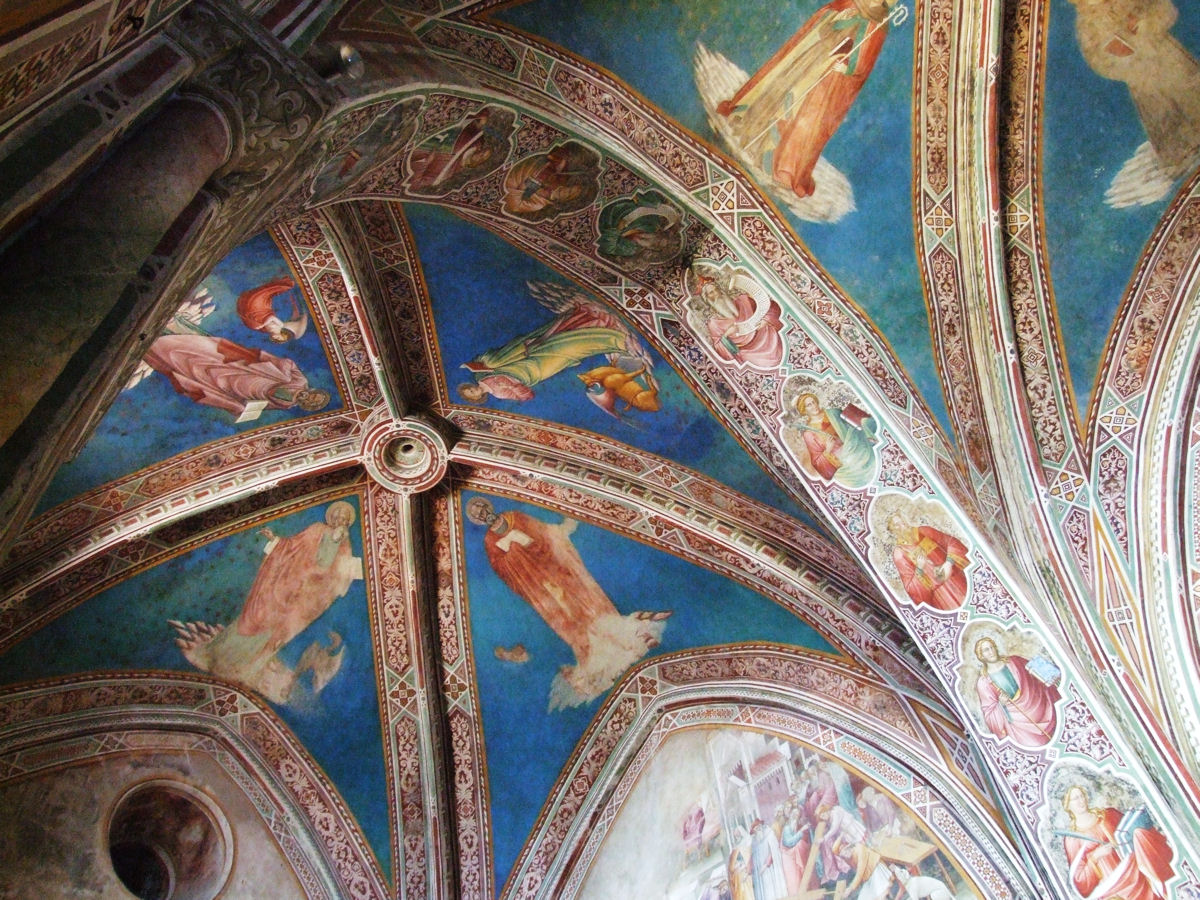
Frescoes of the Evangelists by Jacopo da Firenze
