= San Pietro in Selci =

Roman Catholic church in Volterra, Italy

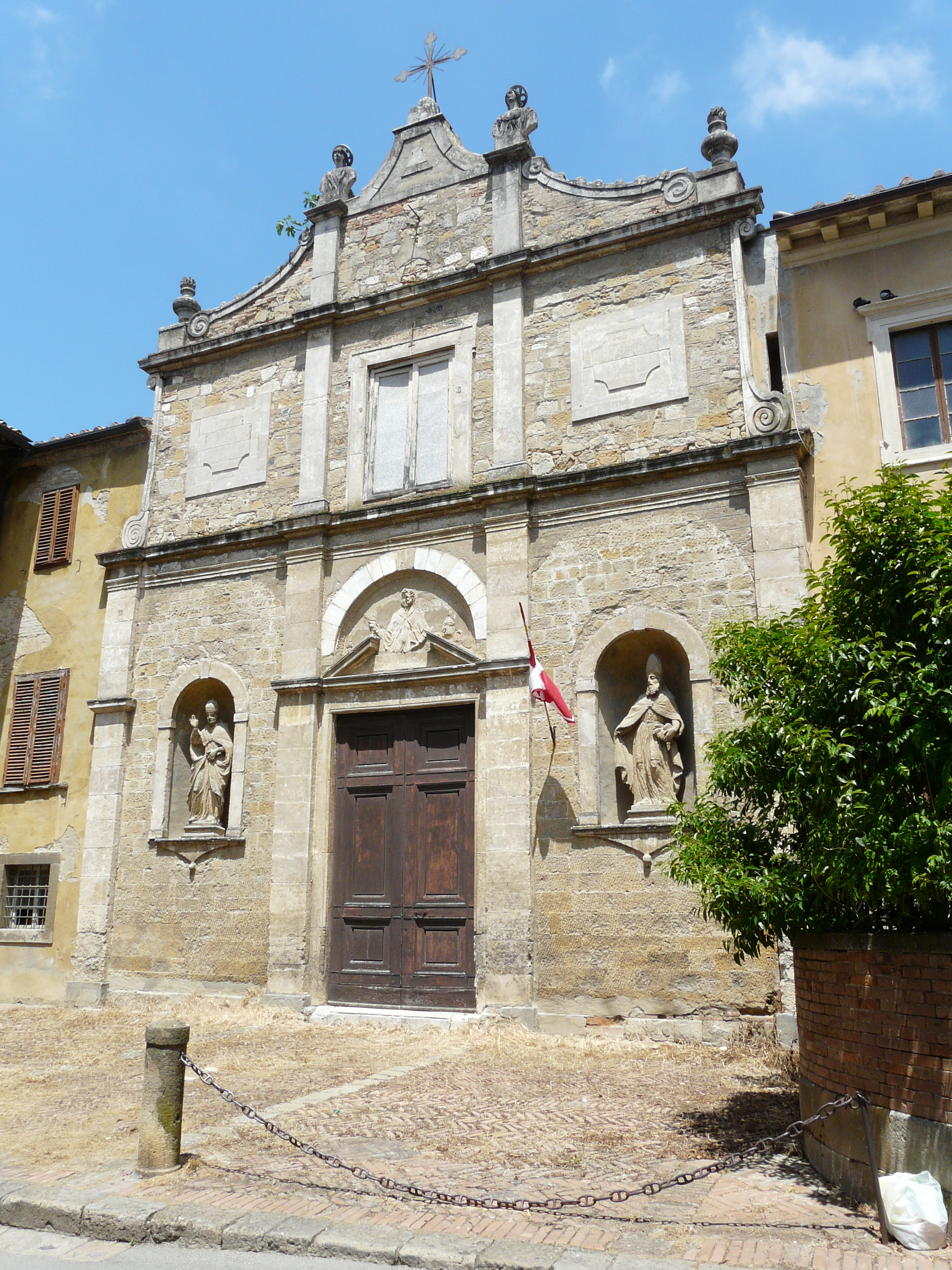

- Location within Tuscany Location within Italy

Religion
- Affiliation: Roman Catholic
- Province: Pisa

Location
- Location: Volterra, Italy
- Coordinates: 43.4006°N 10.8654°E

Architecture
- Type: Church
- Style: Baroque facade

San Pietro in Selci is a Roman Catholic church located on Via Don Giovanni Minzoni #49 in Volterra, province of Pisa, region of Tuscany, Italy.

== History and description ==
A church was initially established by Guiscard, Marquis of Tuscany in 1005, and part of the building we see today dates to the 12th century. In 1507, Bishop consecrated a reconstruction, but the church sports today a later Baroque facade with statues in tufa of Santi Lino and Giusto by Leonardo Ricciarelli.

The interior has a single nave with a plain white stucco ceiling. The main altar is populated with candelabra. On each side there are two side altars. The first altarpiece on the right depicts an Annunciation with four saints and a donor by Niccolò Circignani. The two saints in the center are St Thomas Aquinas with the sun symbol on his chest and to his right is likely San Giusto (Justin), first bishop and patron saint of Volterra with a model of the city at his feet. The second altarpiece on the right, also by Circignani depicts Coronation of the Virgin with four saints. The first altarpiece on the left, depicts an Allegory of the Immaculate Conception by Francesco Brini. The Virgin is crowned above two apostles: St Peter with the key and St Paul with the sword. In the center, she frees the bindings that tie Adam and Eve with original sin to a leafless tree around which a chimeric snake-figure from the Garden of Eden is coiled. Finally the second altarpiece on the left depicts a Madonna and four saints by Cosimo Daddi.

== Sources ==
- Italian Wikipedia entry
