= Pinacoteca e Museo Civico di Volterra =

Museum in Volterra, Tuscany, Italy

Coordinates: 43.4029°N 10.8595°E

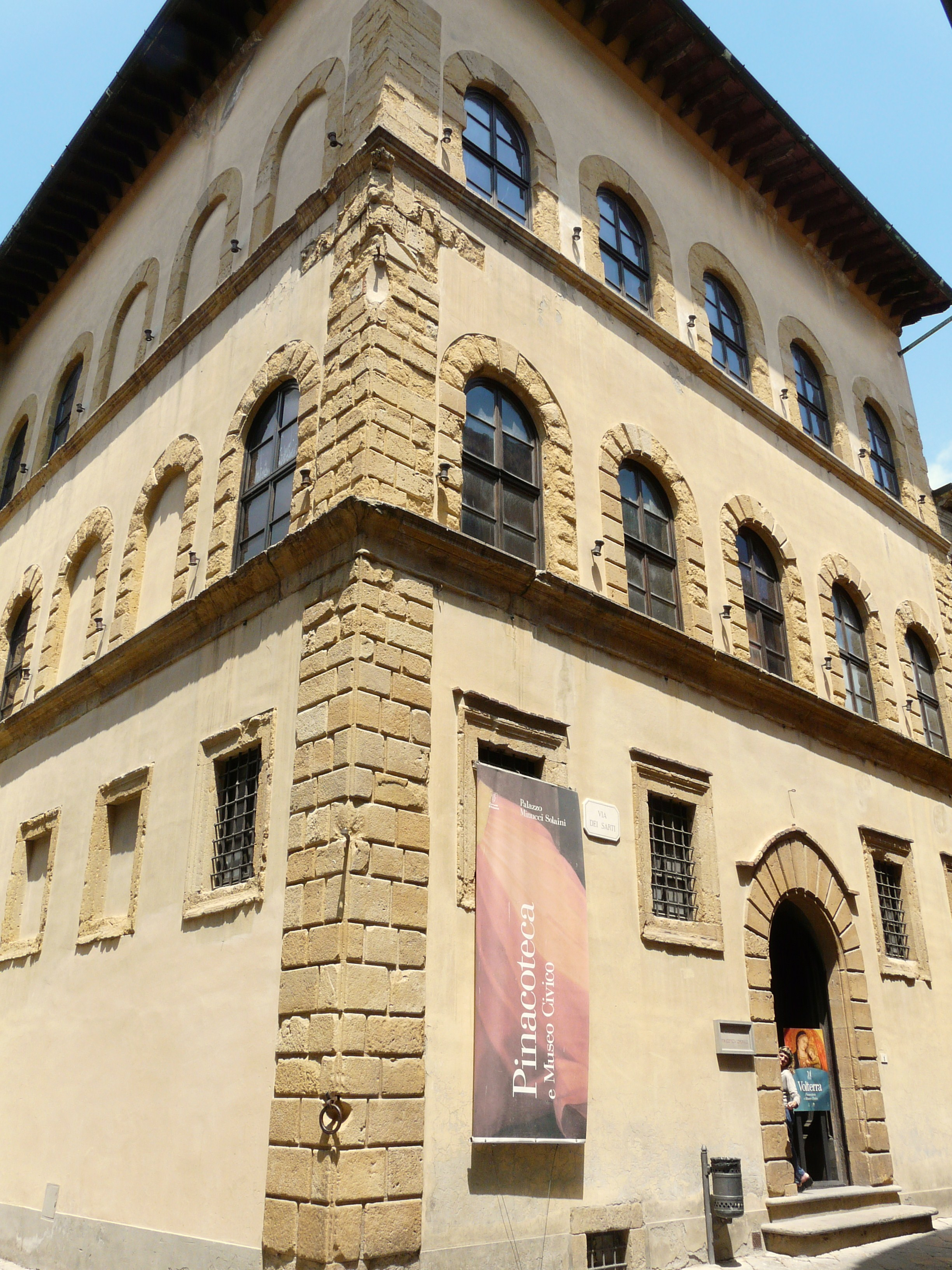
Facade of the Palazzo Minucci-Solaini

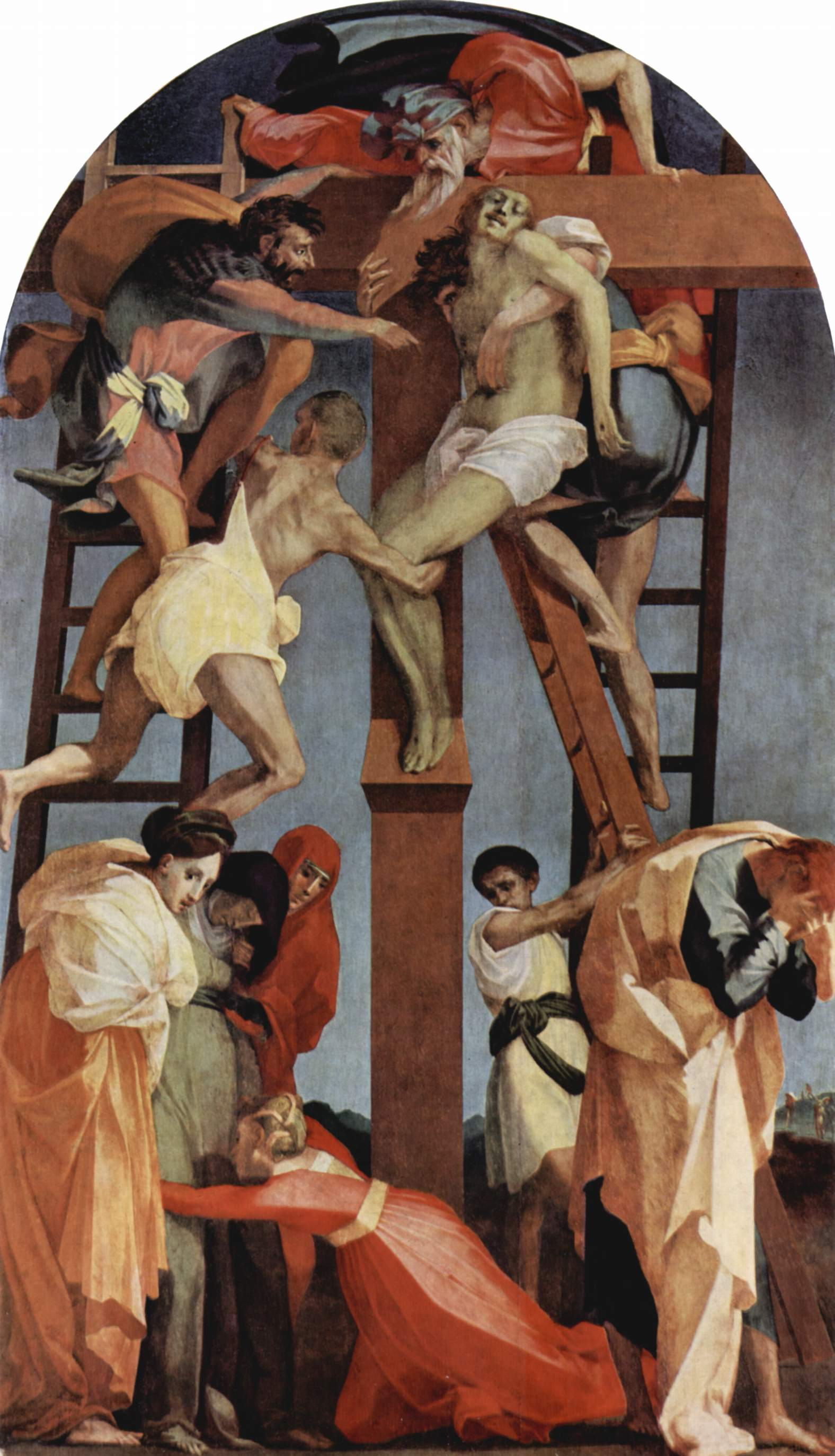
Rosso Fiorentino, Deposition from the Cross

The Pinacoteca e Museo Civico di Volterra (Picture Gallery and Civic Museum of Volterra) is located in the Palazzo Minucci-Solaini on via de' Sarti #1 in the town of Volterra, province of Pisa, region of Tuscany, Italy.

== History and description ==
The core of the collection was assembled initially in 1868 from works from suppressed churches and monasteries. By the 20th century, the local superintendent of art and art historian, Corrado Ricci, added works from his collection and others, for a display in the Palazzo dei Priori. In 1905, the collection was displayed as Galleria Pictorica. The collection included works by Domenico Ghirlandaio, Pietro Candido, Priamo della Quercia, Taddeo di Bartolo, and Luca Signorelli, and the Volterra Deposition by Rosso Fiorentino. The gallery was closed during the Second World War until 1948.

The Palazzo dei Priori was a cramped locale for the many works, and in 1981 a display of works at the Palazzo Minucci-Solaini induced the authorities to create a new museum at that site, inaugurated in 1982. This palazzo was built in the late 1400s, with the design traditionally attributed to Antonio da Sangallo the Elder.

== Collections ==
Among the works in the museum are:

- Volterra Deposition by Rosso Fiorentino, considered the Mannerist painter's masterpiece
- Annunciation (1491) and Enthroned Madonna and Child with Saints (1491) by Luca Signorelli
- Madonna of the Rose, Enthroned Madonna and Child and Saints Anthony Abbot, John the Baptist, and Francis (1411) and Saints Nicholas of Tolentino and Peter by Taddeo di Bartolo
- Madonna and Child by Jacopo di Michele
- Madonna of the Long Neck by Stefano di Antonio di Vanni
- Saint Sebastian Between Saints Bartholomew and Nicholas by Neri di Bicci
- Nativity and Scenes from the Life of the Virgin by Benvenuto di Giovanni
- Christ in Glory with Four Saints and a Donor by Domenico Ghirlandaio
- Adoration of the Shepherds and Lamentation over the Dead Christ by Pieter de Witte
- Birth of the Virgin by Donato Mascagni
- Annunciation, Immaculate Conception and Lamentation over the Dead Christ by Pomarancio
- Sacra Conversazione, attributed to Giovanni Domenico Ferretti
- Madonna and Child with Saints Catherine and Lucy by Jacopo di Michele, also known as il Gera
- Polyptych by Cenni di Francesco di Ser Cenni
- Polyptych of the Virgin and Child with Saints Nicholas, John the Baptist, Christopher, and Michael by Alvaro Pirez
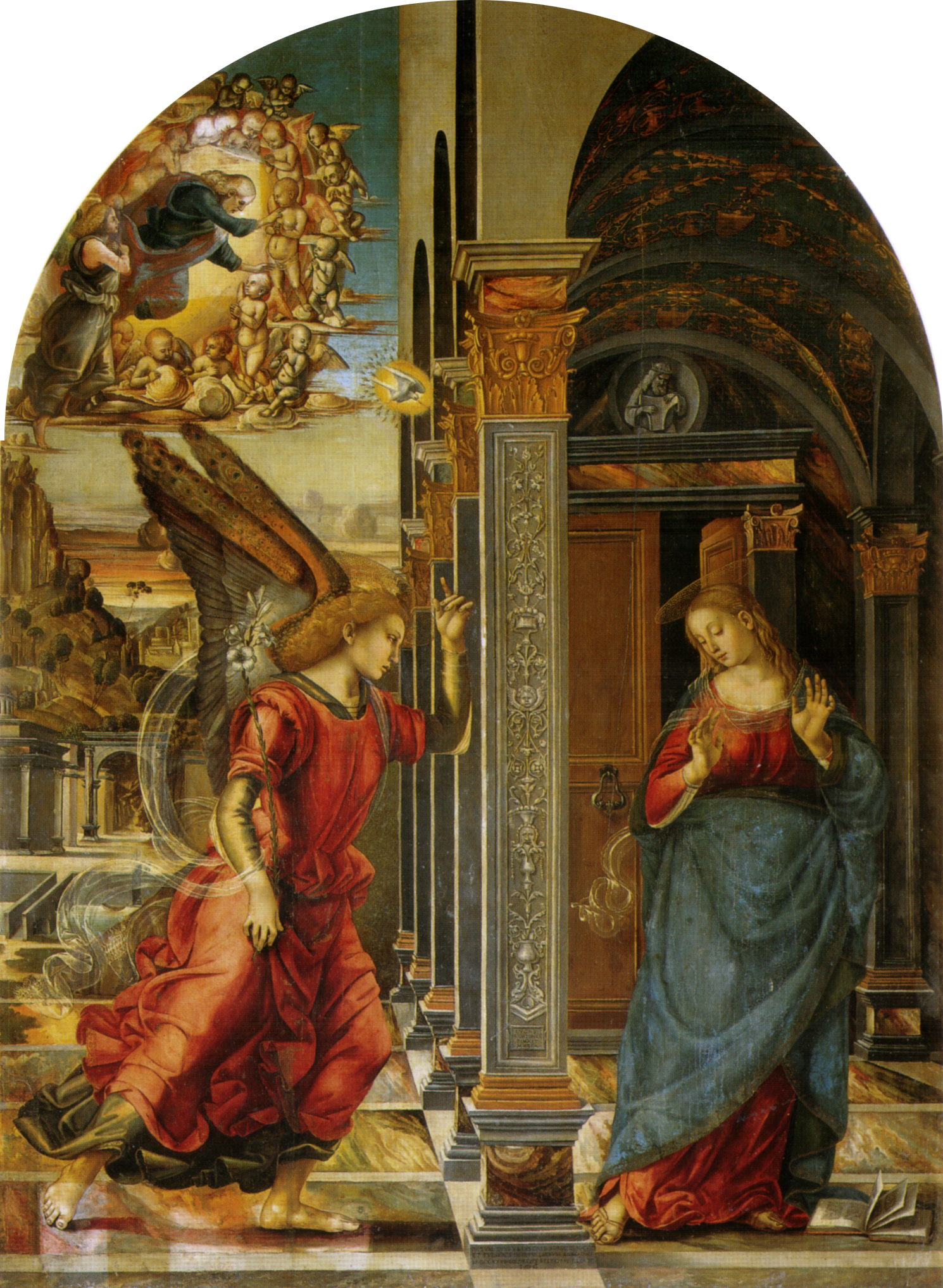
Signorelli, Annunciation, fresco

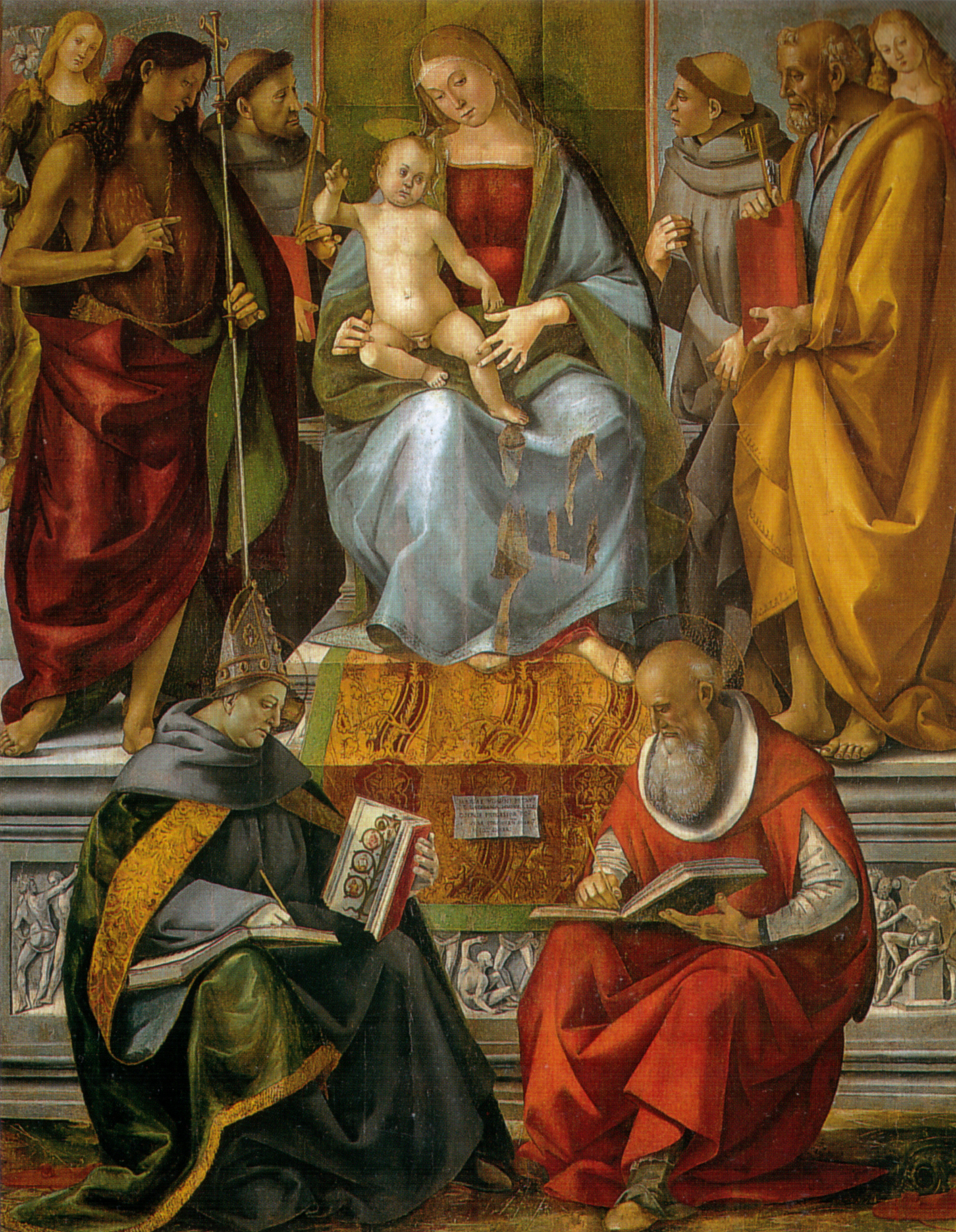
Signorelli, Enthroned Madonna and Saints, tempera on wood

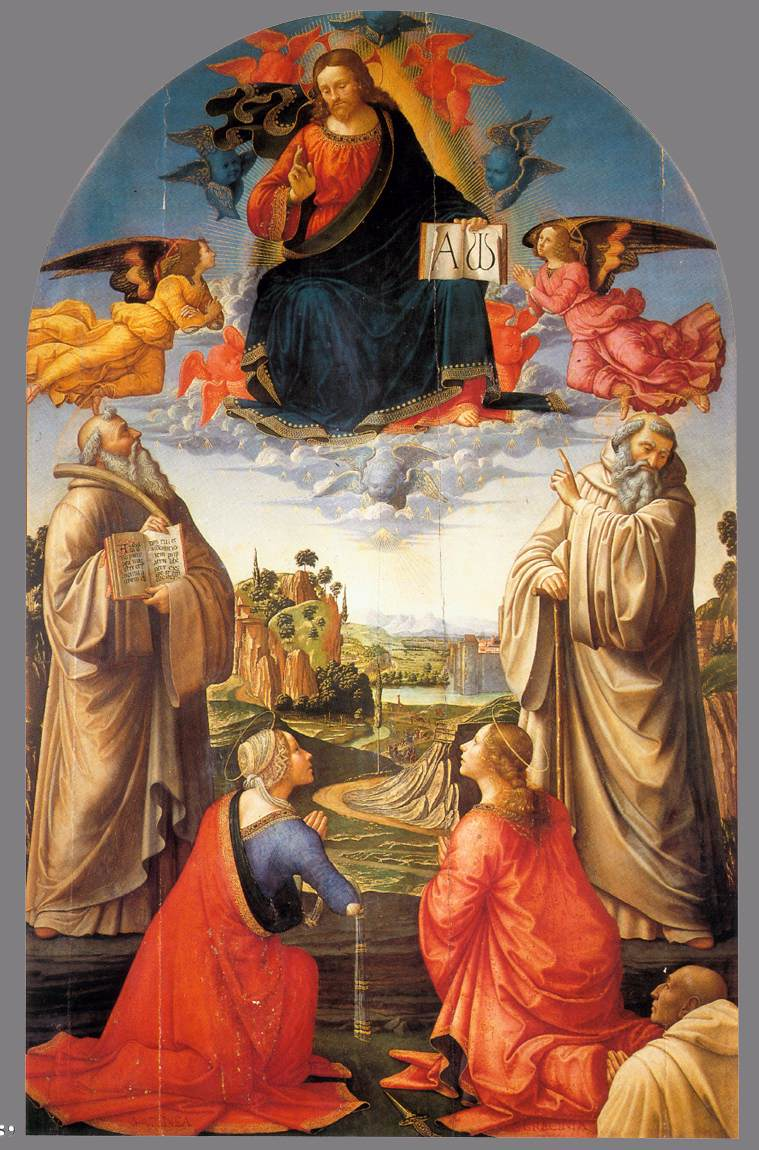
Studio of Ghirlandaio, Christ in Glory with Four Saints and a Donor, tempera on wood

== Bibliography ==
- Derived from the Italian Wikipedia entry
- Renato Bacci, La Pinacoteca e il Museo di Arte Sacra Arti Grafiche C.G., Milano 1997
- Antonio Paolucci, La pinacoteca di Volterra, 1989
