= Campi Bisenzio =

- Comune
- Comune di Campi Bisenzio
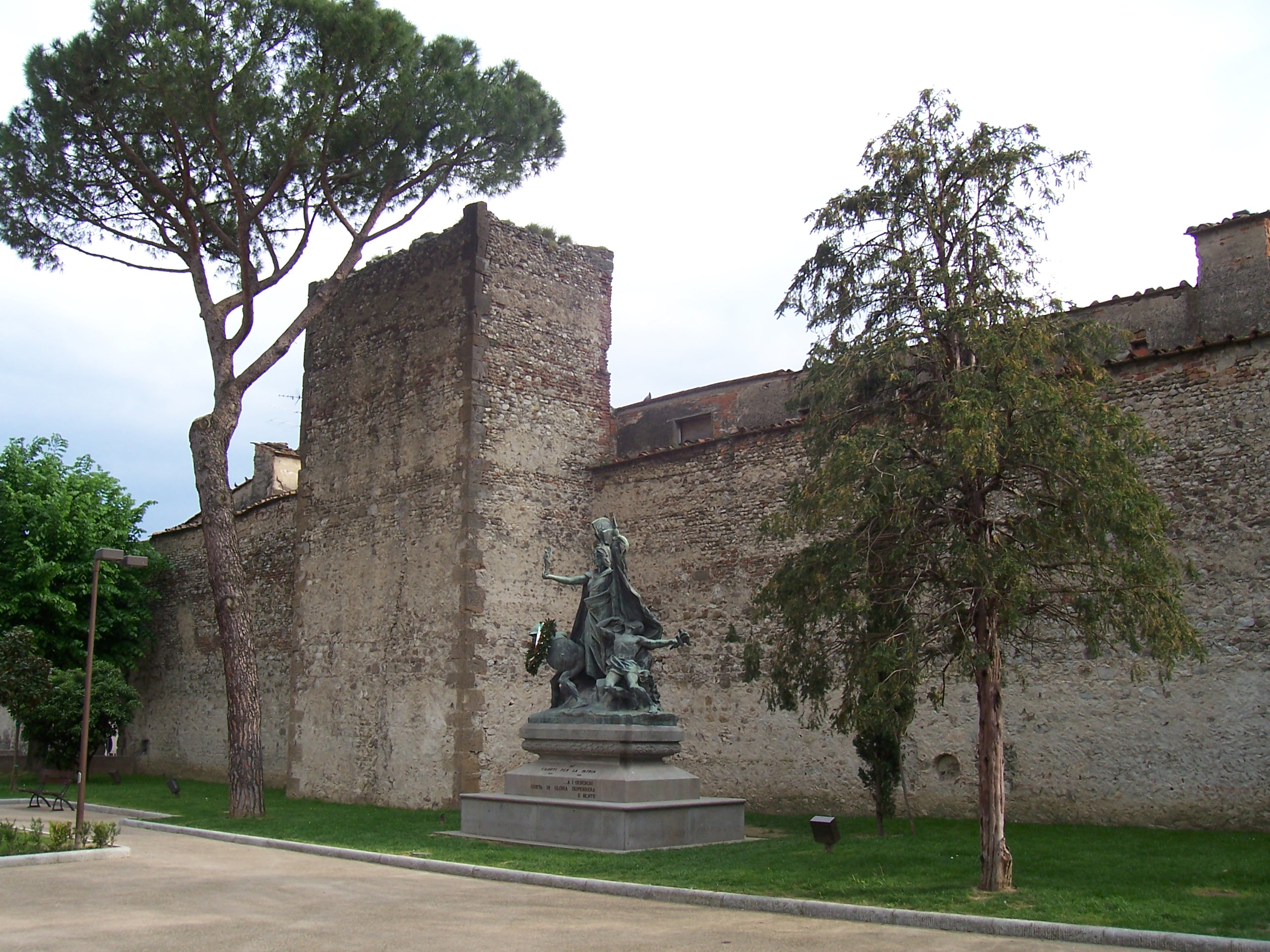
- Northern side of the wall of Campi Bisenzio

- Coat of arms

- Location within Italy Location within Tuscany
- Coordinates: 43°49′N 11°8′E
- Country: Italy
- Region: Tuscany
- Metropolitan city: Florence (FI)
- Frazioni: Capalle, Il Rosi, La Villa, Le Miccine, Limite, San Cresci, San Donnino, San Giorgio a Colonica, San Piero a Ponti, Sant'Angelo a Lecore

Government
  - Mayor: Emiliano Fossi

Area
  - Total: 28.6 km^{2} (11.0 sq mi)
- Elevation: 38 m (125 ft)

Population (31 December 2016)
  - Total: 46,878
  - Density: 1,640/km^{2} (4,250/sq mi)
- Demonym: Campigiani
- Time zone: UTC+1 (CET)
  - Summer (DST): UTC+2 (CEST)
- Postal code: 50013
- Dialing code: 055
- Website: Official website

Campi Bisenzio (Italian pronunciation: [ˈkampi biˈzɛntsjo]) is a comune (municipality) in the Metropolitan City of Florence, in the Italian region of Tuscany, located about 10 kilometres (6 mi) northwest of Florence.

== History ==
The word Campi in the municipality's name stems from the fields which are widespread in the lands around the town. The current name of Campi Bisenzio was assumed only in 1862, with the addition of the name of the Bisenzio river that runs through the town.

Campi Bisenzio is the place where the internal combustion engine was built for the first time by Felice Matteucci and father Eugenio Barsanti.

A number of Renaissance artworks from the church of Sant'Andrea a San Donnino are housed in its adjacent museum. The church of Santa Maria a Campi Bisenzio still maintains many of its original artworks.

== Twin towns ==
Campi Bisenzio is twinned with:

- Coatbridge, Scotland, United Kingdom
- (Sahrawi Arab Democratic Republic) Bir Lehlou, Western Sahara
