= Getto di Jacopo =

Italian painter

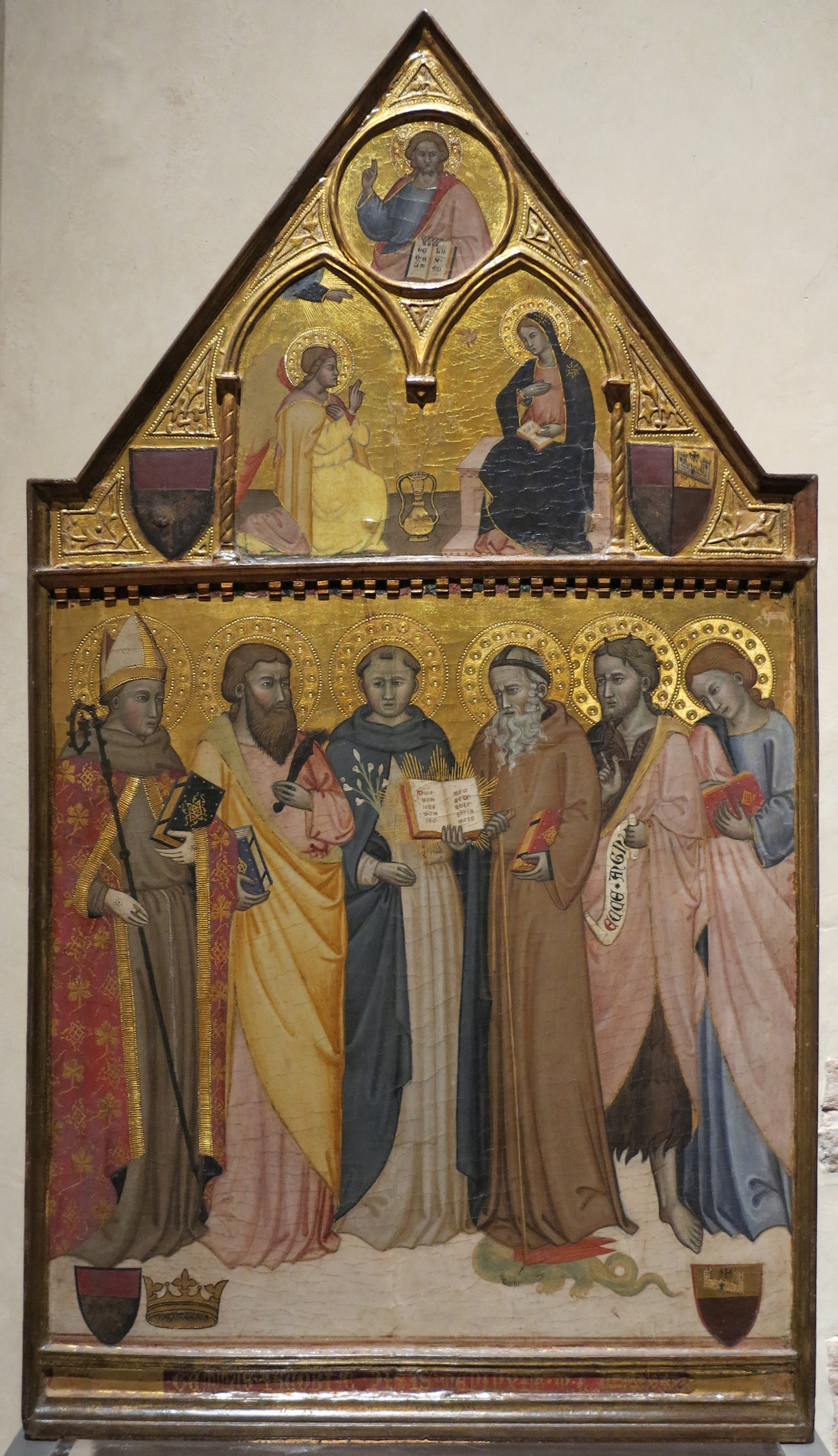
Six Saints, Museo nazionale di San Matteo, Pisa

Getto or Ghetto di Jacopo (Active 1386–1405) was an Italian painter, mainly active in Pisa. He was the brother of Jacopo di Michele.

His only signed work is depiction of six saints in the Museo di San Matteo, Pisa. A Noli Me Tangere fresco, from the former church of San Felice e Regolo and acquired by the Cassa di Risparmio di Pisa (now on display in Palazzo Blu), has been attributed to Getto.
