= Stefano d'Antonio di Vanni =

Italian painter

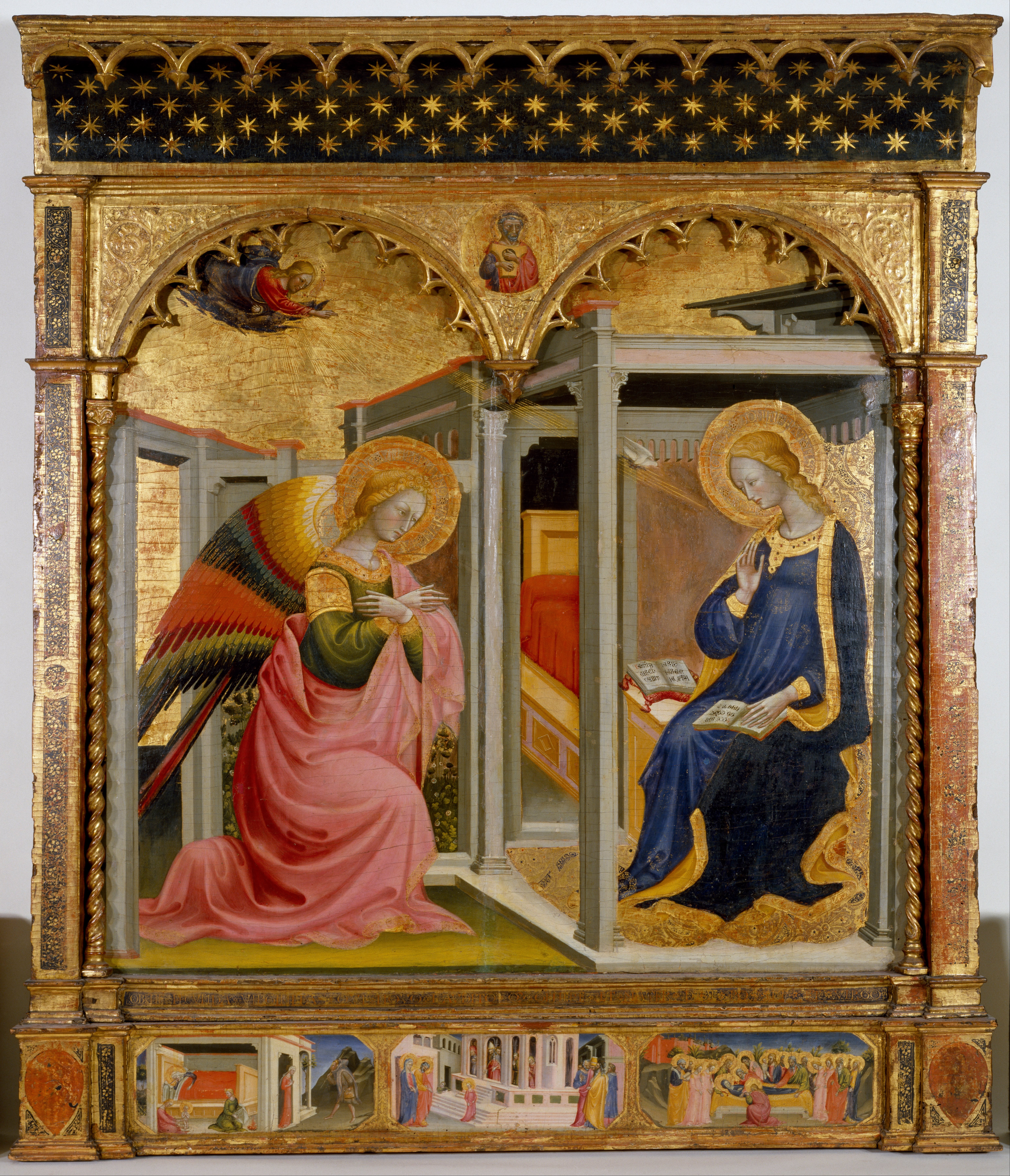
The Annunciation by Stefano d'Antonio di Vanni, altarpiece, Walters Art Museum, 1430

Stefano d'Antonio di Vanni (c. 1405–1483) was an Italian Renaissance painter.

Not much is known about Stefano d'Antonio di Vanni's life except through his works. He was born in Florence, and his style puts him in the Florentine School. He primarily painted religious-themed works for local church commissions. He painted frescoes in the former refectory of the parish church of St. Andrea. He also painted a number of altarpieces with Bicci di Lorenzo. He was an assistant of Bacci di Lorenzo and, later, one of his main collaborators. He died in 1483. One of his works is part of the Courtauld Gallery collection.

== Works ==
- Madonna with the Long Neck, Pinacoteca e museo civico di Volterra
- Baptism of San Pancrazio, distemper on wood, 68,5x52 3 cm, Musée Bandini, Fiesole
- Annunciation, tempera and gold on wood (attribution) in collaboration with Bicci di Lorenzo
- Baptism of Christ, Nativity of Jesus, Museo Civico Amedeo Lia, La Spezia
- Last Supper, fresco, Parish Church of St Andrew, Cercina, Sesto Fiorentino
- Madonna of the Girdle, fresco (v.1430) in collaboration with Bicci di Lorenzo
