= Christ in Glory with Four Saints and a Donor =

Painting by Domenico Ghirlandaio and his studio

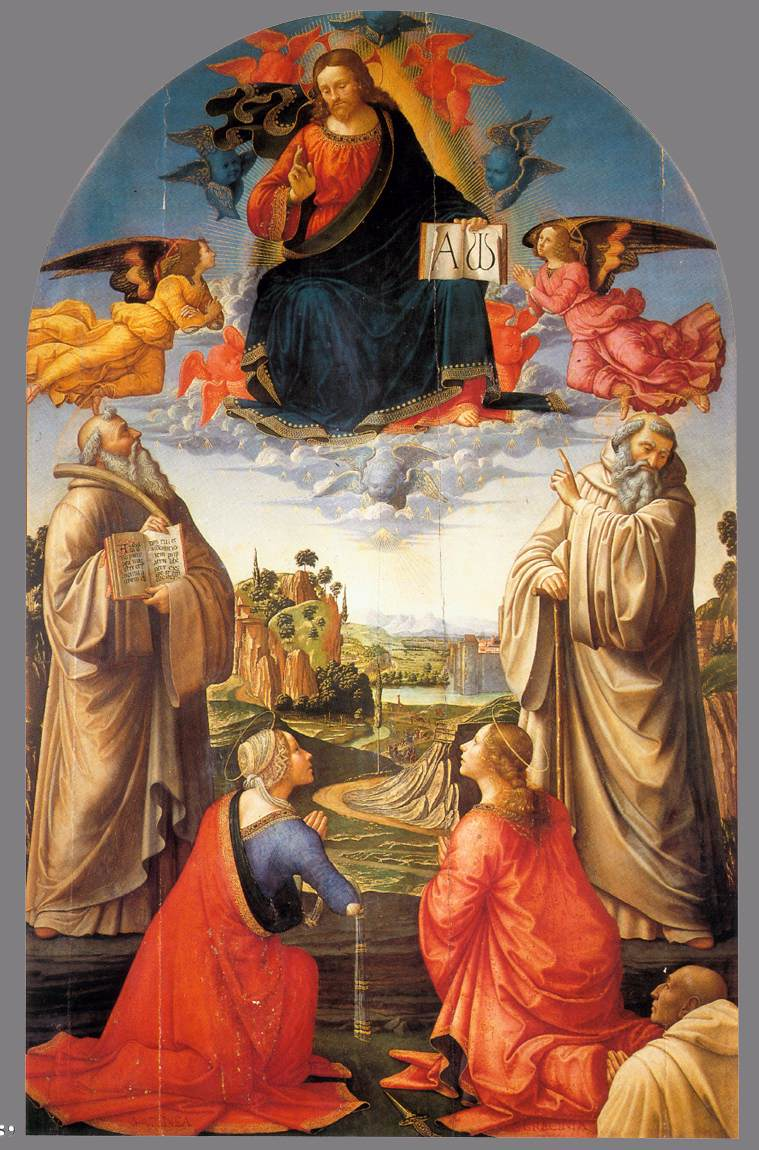

Christ in Glory with Four Saints and a Donor is a c.1492 tempera on panel painting by Domenico Ghirlandaio and his studio.

It was commissioned by Giusto Bonvicini, abbot of the Camaldolese Santi Giusto e Clemente Abbey in Volterra - the two standing saints may be saints Giovanni Gualberto and Saint Romuald, linked to the Camaldolese Congregation. It was painted in Ghirlandaio's studio in Florence (only details and the original composition are thought to be by the master) and taken to Volterra, where it is now in the town's Pinacoteca e museo civico di Volterra.

== Bibliography (in Italian) ==
- Andreas Quermann, Ghirlandaio, serie dei Maestri dell'arte italiana, Könemann, Köln 1998.
- Emma Micheletti, Domenico Ghirlandaio, in Pittori del Rinascimento, Scala, Firenze 2004. ISBN 88-8117-099-X
- Alessandro Furiesi, Guida alla Pinacoteca di Volterra, Felici Editori, Pisa, 2006, pp. 37 – 39 ISBN 88-6019-035-5
