= Cenni di Francesco =

Italian painter

Cenni di Francesco di Ser Cenni
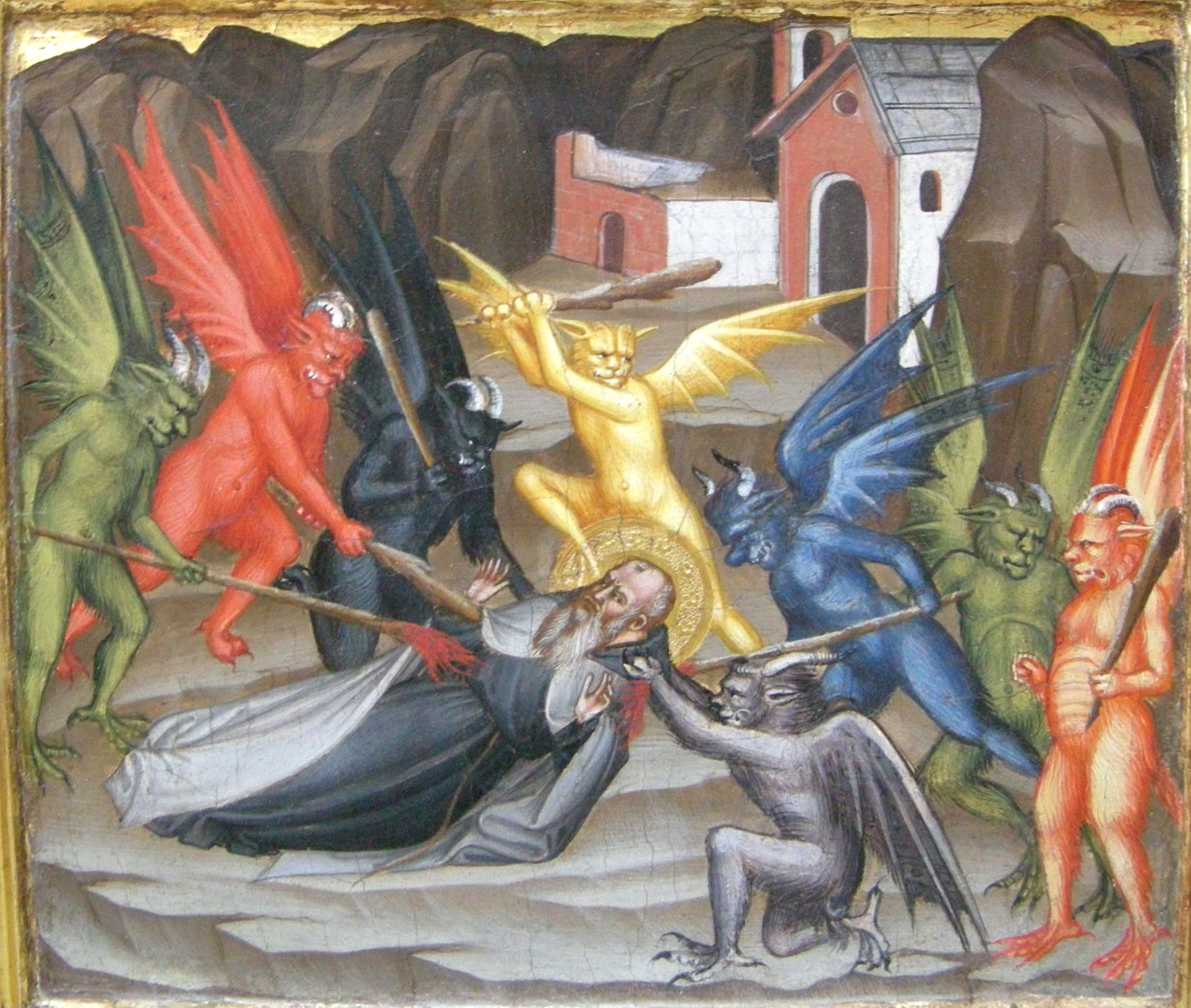
- Cenni di Francesco di Ser Cenni, The temptation of Saint Anthony, a detail of the polyptych with Coronation of the Virgin and Saints, Los Angeles, The Getty Museum
- Born: Cenni di Francesco di Ser Cenni; 1369/1370; Florence Tuscany, Italy
- Died: c. 1425; Florence Tuscany, Italy
- Known for: Painting
- Movement: Gothic

Cenni di Francesco di ser Cenni was an Italian Gothic painter active in Florence between 1369/1370 and 1415. His only signed work is the fresco of the True Cross at the Cappella della Croce di Giorno at the church of San Francesco in Volterra, painted in 1410. A couple of dozen works have been attributed to Cenni di Francesco on the basis of a similarity of style with the fresco.

The fresco at the entrance to the Basilica of Santa Maria Novella in Florence is attributed to Cenni di Francesco as well, and it was presumably painted in the early 1390s, based on a comparison with the paintings of this period.

A Polyptych with Coronation of the Virgin and Saints (circa 1390) is on display in the Getty Museum in California.

== Biography ==
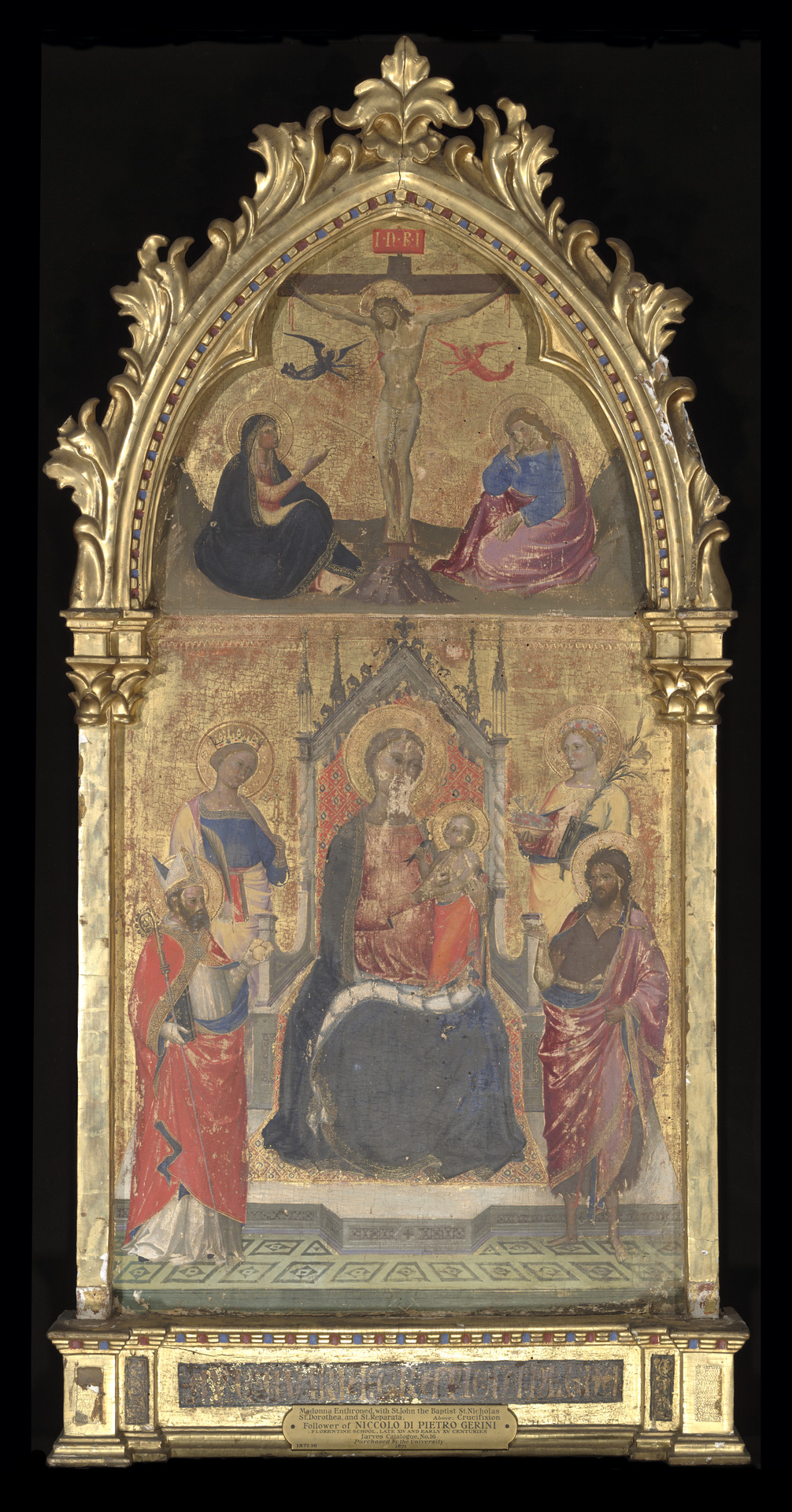
Virgin and Child Enthroned with Saints John the Baptist, Nicholas, Dorothy and Reparata, with Crucifixions, the Yale University Art Gallery.

He was registered in the art of physicians and apothecaries in 1369 and listed among Florentine painters in 1415. A fresco depicting the Madonna Enthroned with Angels and the Cardinal and Theological Virtues in the town hall of San Miniato al Tedesco dates back to 1393, while the frescoes in San Donato in Polverosa in Florence seem to date back to 1383. Other key data for the reconstruction of Cenni's activity, only recently reconsidered by critics, are, in addition to the signature and the date 1410 inscribed on the frescoes in San Francesco in Volterra, the documented belonging to the painter of the panel with St Jerome in his study in the Museum of Sacred Art in San Miniato al Tedesco dated 1411 and the fresco decoration of the church and oratory of San Lorenzo in San Gimignano executed in 1413. To this must be added the date 1400 inscribed on a triptych in the church of San Giusto in Montalbino and the date 1408 inscribed on a polyptych in the Pinacoteca di Volterra. Around these certain and certainly dated works can be grouped others, referred to him by recent critics, that integrate the brief catalogue by Cavalcaselle (1897) already recognised to the painter, making him considered to be one of the most pleasant and lively interpreters of Florentine taste between the 14th and 15th centuries.

== Bibliography ==
- F. Allegri – M. Tosi, Castelfiorentino terra d'arte, collana “Valdelsa Millenaria”, Certaldo (Fi), Federighi Editori, 2005, p. 93.
- Silvia Bartalucci – Silvano Mori, La chiesa di San Francesco a Castelfiorentino, Città di Castello (Pg), Leo S. Olschki Editore, 2005, p. 47 ISBN 88-222-5511-9
- M. Burresi – A Caleca, Volterra d'oro e di pietra, catalogo della mostra, Volterra, Palazzo dei Priori – Pinacoteca Civica, 20 luglio – 1º novembre 2006, Ospedaletto (Pi), Pacini Editore, 2006, pp. 61, 106 - 107. ISBN 88-7781-775-5
- Franco Lessi, Volterra e la Val di Cecina, collana "I Luoghi della Fede", Milano, Mondadori, 1999, pp. 64 – 66. ISBN 88-04-46773-8
- Rosanna Caterina Proto Pisani (a cura di), Il Museo di Arte Sacra a Certaldo, collana La Biblioteca de "Lo Studiolo", Firenze, Becocci/Scala, 2001, p. 31 - 33.
- Rosanna Caterina Proto Pisani (a cura di), Il Museo di Arte Sacra a Montespertoli, collana La Biblioteca de "Lo Studiolo", Firenze, Becocci/Scala, 1995, p. 29.
- Rosanna Caterina Proto Pisani, Il Museo di Arte Sacra a San Casciano Val di Pesa, collana Biblioteca de "Lo Studiolo", Firenze, Becocci / Scala, 1992, p. 37.
- Rosanna Caterina Proto Pisani (a cura di), Museo della Collegiata di Sant'Andrea a Empoli, collana "Piccoli Grandi Musei", Firenze, Edizioni Polistampa, 2006, p. 76, 174 (breve nota biografica).ISBN 88-596-0083-9
- Rosanna Caterina Proto Pisani (a cura di), Museo di Santa Verdiana a Castelfiorentino, collana "Piccoli Grandi Musei", Firenze, Edizioni Polistampa, 2006, p. 45 - 47. ISBN 88-596-0067-7
- Sacre Suggestioni. Museo dell'Opera del Duomo di Prato, Firenze, Polistampa, 2001, pp. 19 – 20
- Franco Lessi, Mariagiulia Burresi, Antonio Caleca, Volterra, la cappella della croce di San Francesco, Siena, Centrooffset, 1991
