= The Circumcision (Signorelli) =

Painting by Luca Signorelli

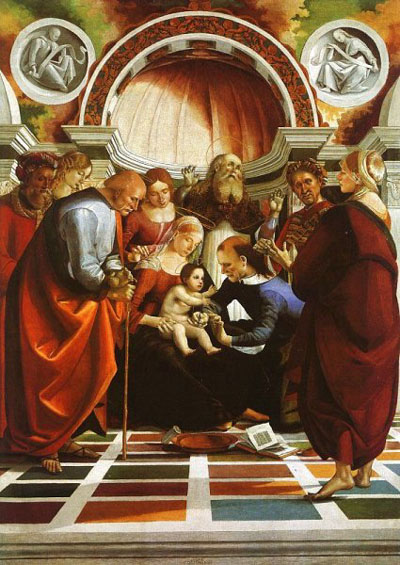
- Artist: Luca Signorelli
- Year: c. 1490–1491
- Type: Oil on panel transferred to canvas and then to panel
- Dimensions: 259 cm × 180 cm (102 in × 71 in)
- Location: National Gallery, London

The Circumcision is a painted altarpiece of the Circumcision of Jesus by the Italian Renaissance painter Luca Signorelli, in the National Gallery in London, dated to c. 1490–1491.

The Circumcision was also the occasion of the naming of Jesus, and by this period the emphasis of Catholic devotion was on the Holy Name of Jesus. The work was commissioned by the local Confraternity of the Holy Name of Jesus for the altar of the Circumcision Chapel in the church of San Francesco, Volterra, where Signorelli was working for the Medicis. Like many Renaissance versions of the subject it conflates it with the Presentation of Jesus by including Simeon at the rear. The Renaissance art historian and artist Giorgio Vasari saw the painting and described it as damaged by humidity, the Child having been repainted by Il Sodoma. The painting was acquired by the National Gallery in 1882.

== Description ==
The background is formed by a sumptuous niche with polychrome marbles, with two medallions portraying a Prophet and a Sibyl. It is perhaps a citation of the Brera Altarpiece by Signorelli's master, Piero della Francesca. Before it is the crowded scene taken from the Circumcision of Jesus.

The stripes on the garments of the man on the left were common in the fashion of the time, and can be seen in several contemporary paintings, such as the Flagellation Banner by Signorelli himself.

== Sources ==
- Paolucci, Antonio (2004). "Luca Signorelli". Pittori del Rinascimento. Florence: Scala. ISBN 88-8117-099-X.
- Penny, Nicholas, National Gallery Catalogues (new series): The Sixteenth Century Italian Paintings, Volume I, 2004, National Gallery Publications Ltd, ISBN 1-85709-908-7
