= Annunciation (Signorelli) =

Painting by Luca Signorelli in Volterra

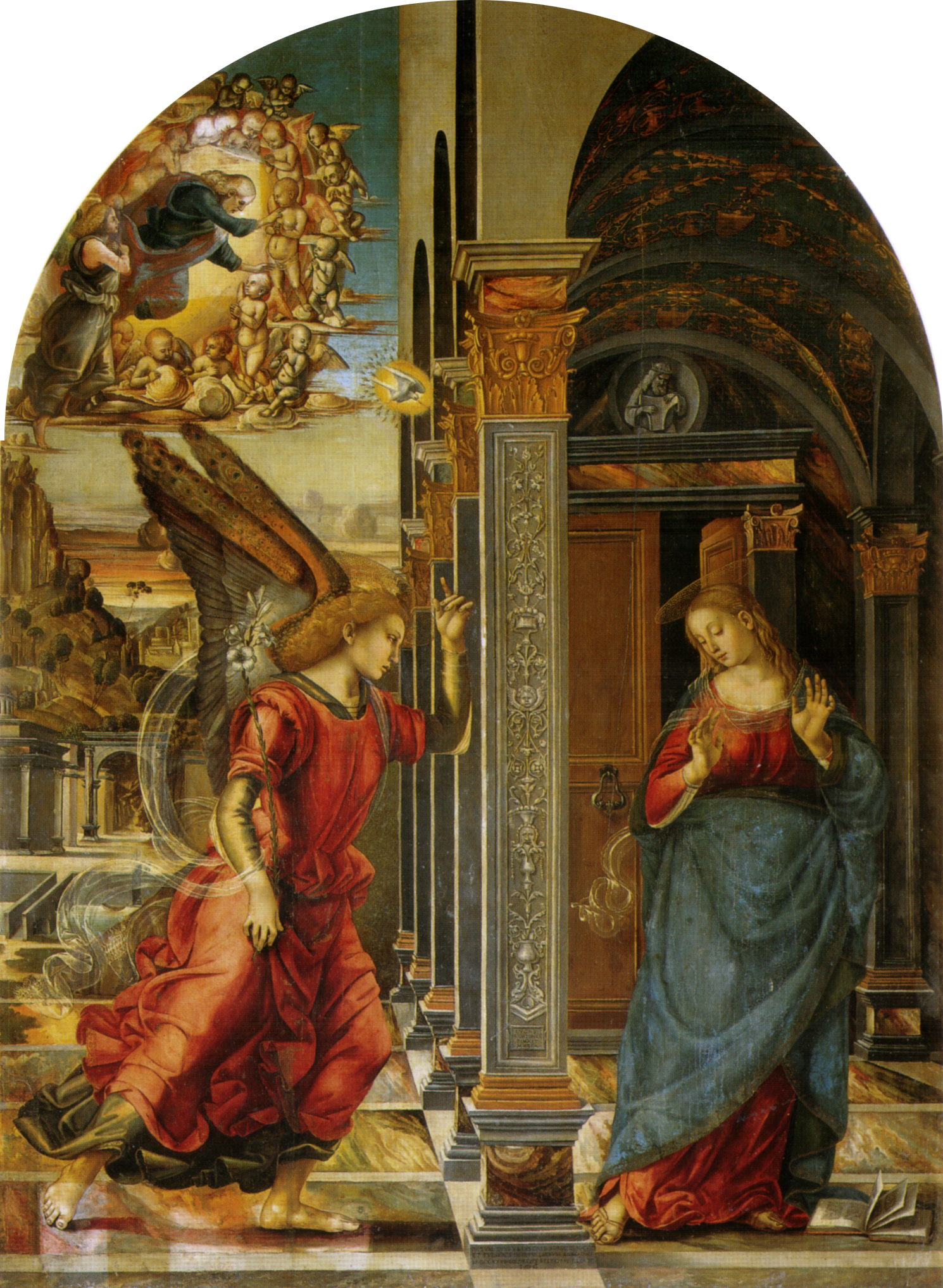
Annunciation (1491) by Luca Signorelli

Annunciation is a 1491 tempera on panel painting by Luca Signorelli, signed by the artist. It is now in the Pinacoteca e museo civico in Volterra.

The painting depicts a hieratic scene of Marian imagery. The Archangel Gabriel, with wings bedecked with peacock feathers to identify his status among angels, resolutely informs Mary of the will of God. She demurely accepts. In the upper register God the Father appears among a bevy of putti and another apparent Angel; God sends his contribution for the gestation in the form of a dove, akin to the symbol of the Holy Spirit. The event occurs partly outside, with Mary in a decorated private portico. Above the door appears to be a circular relief of a man signaling a page in a book; like the prophet Elias foretelling the birth of Christ.
