= Cosimo Daddi =

Italian painter (died 1630)

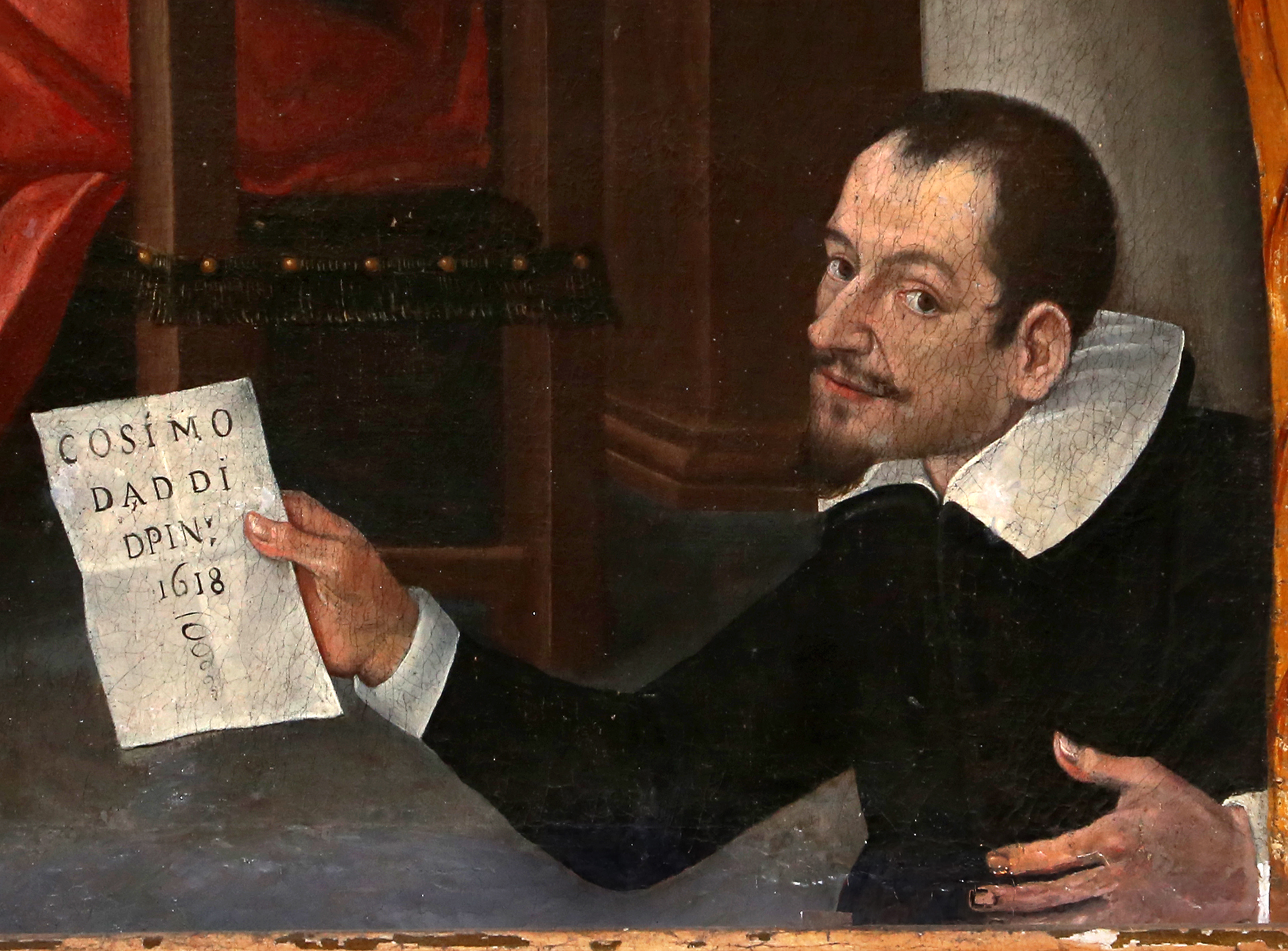
Self-portrait in Volterra

Cosimo Daddi (before 1575–1630), was a late Renaissance painter active mainly around Volterra and Florence. In 1591–94, he participated in the fresco decoration (the deeds of Godefroy de Bouillon) of the Villa Petraia for the Medici family. Baldassare Franceschini was one of his pupils.
