= San Carlo, Viterbo =

Parish church and minor basilica in Viterbo, Italy

San Carlo

Religion
- Affiliation: deconsecrated Roman Catholic
- Ecclesiastical or organizational status: Part of University of Tuscia

Location
- Location: Via San Carlo #32, Viterbo, Lazio, Italy
- Interactive map of San Carlo
- Coordinates: 42.41270°N 12.10213°E

Architecture
- Type: Church
- Style: Romanesque

San Carlo is a Romanesque-style, deconsecrated Roman Catholic church in the south-western edge of historic Viterbo, regio of Lazio, Italy. The church is now used as a classroom-auditorium for the Faculty of Political Sciences of the University of Tuscia. The adjacent cloister is used mainly for offices.

== History ==
A church by the name of San Niccolò del Piano or San Nicola del Scolare is documented by 12th-century, in what would become the Piano Scarano district of Viterbo. The district was soon enclosed by city walls. The parish church and convent was a dependency of the Benedictine order Abbey of Farfa, with the monks housed at Santa Maria della Cella. By 1560, the church is annexed to the parish of Sant'Andrea. In 1564, Bishop Gualterio placed it under the administration by the cathedral, but the church fell into disuse by the 17th-century.

The adjacent building became a Hospice of Convalescents, which cared for patients discharged from the hospital, but unable to care for themselves. In 1639 the church, was assigned to the Confraternity of the Oblates, founded by Hyacintha Mariscotti (canonized as Saint Hyacintha or Santa Jacinta). The fraternity cared for the poor and invalid in the adjacent medieval cloister, which by the 18th-century became known as the Ospizio dei Vecchi (Nursing Home for the Elderly) of the town. In 1902, the first restoration took place under Bishop Grasselli and the architect Fillippo Pincelloti, accentuating the original Romanesque elements. In 1989 the complex of San Carlo was purchased by the University of Tuscia. Refurbishments took place between 1994 and 2002 and again in 2006. The facade retains its Romanesque simplicity with three lancet windows and one portal. One of the bells in the facade is dated 1285.

The interior is divided into three naves by a set of three heavy columns flanking each side of the main nave. The second column on the right has a 15th-century painting depicting the Madonna della Colonna. A fresco on the lunette above a door to the right depicts a Christ between the Madonna and San Giovanni (13th century).
