= Santa Maria della Salute (disambiguation) =

Santa Maria della Salute is a church in Venice, Italy.

Santa Maria della Salute may also refer to:

- Santa Maria della Salute (film), a Serbian film
- Santa Maria della Salute a Primavalle, a church in Rome, Italy
- Santa Maria della Salute, Viterbo, a church in Viterbo, Italy
