= Palazzo Gatti, Viterbo =

Coordinates: 42.41426°N 12.10694°E

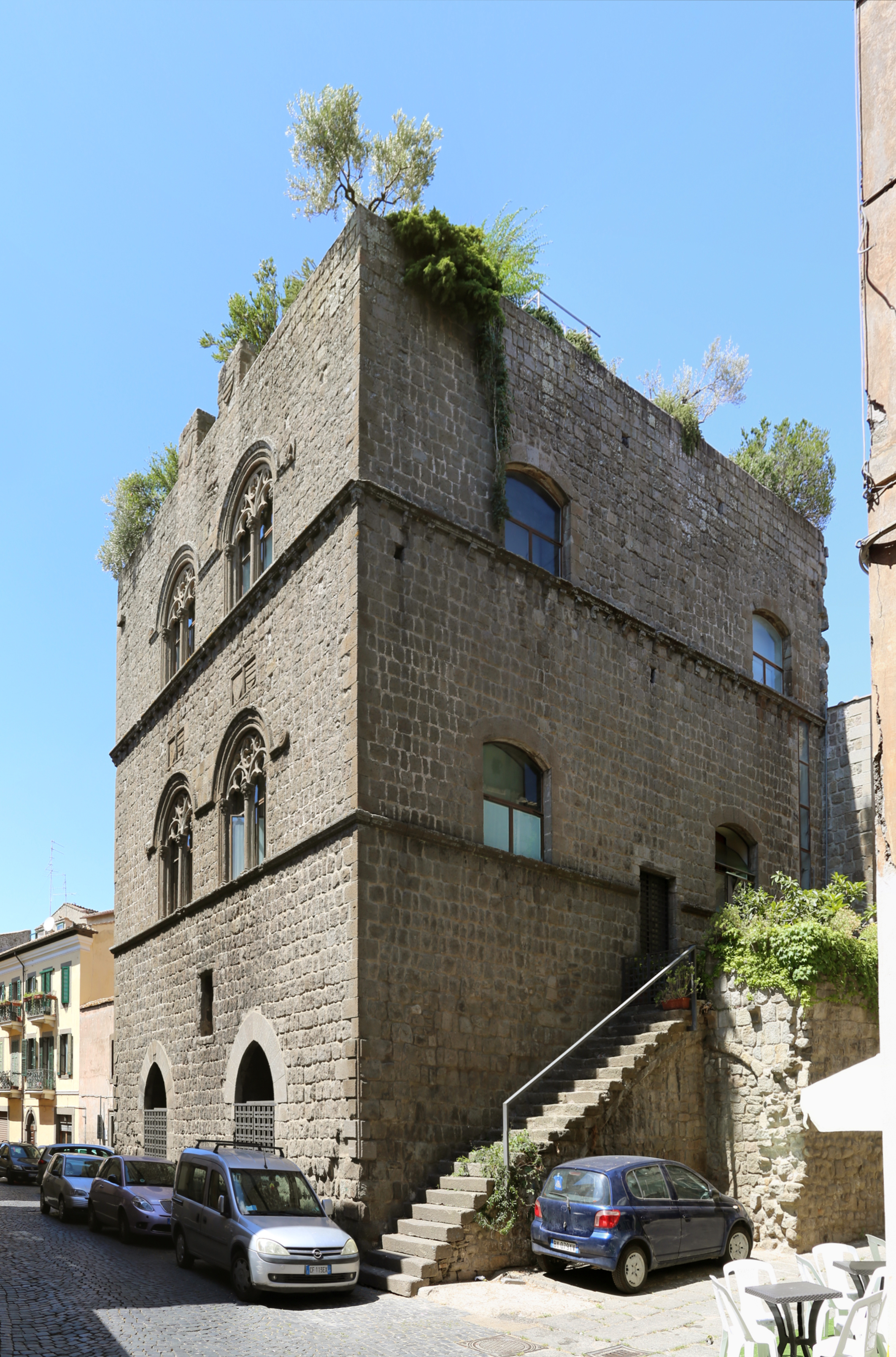
Palazzo Gatti

The Palazzo Gatti (also called Casa Gatti) is a 13th-century Gothic architecture palace located in Via Cardinal La Fontaine, 23 in central Viterbo, region of Lazio, Italy.

This palace was initially erected in 1266 by the capitano del popolo Raniero Gatti. It was a larger complex of buildings, extending westward behind the former church of Santi Giuseppe e Teresa and the former convent of the Discalced Carmelite nuns that still occupies the block between Via La Fontaine and Via degli Scalzi (and the Piazza of the Fontana Grande). As was typical of the houses of noble families in this era, the Gatti Palace included defensive towers, six in number, that no longer exist. The palace is said to have hosted a number of visiting lords, including in 1328 Louis IV, Holy Roman Emperor (Ludovico il Bavaro); in 1452 Frederick III, Holy Roman Emperor on his way to Rome to be crowned by Pope Nicholas V and to receive his bride to be, the young Portuguese princess Lionora; and also in 1474, Federico da Montefeltro, Duke of Urbino. By 1496, the power of the Gatti family and their Ghibelline allies had been routed by the Guelph forces and their allies in Viterbo, including the Tignosi, Orsini, and Maganzesi families.

In the following centuries, the palace fell into near ruin, and various connected structures were razed. Remaining today is a three-story stone structure with peaked-arch portals at the ground floor and mullioned windows on the upper floor. The garden terrace on the roof is a 20th-century addition, replacing a gabled roof previously there. A wide stone staircase, in the alleway leading north, from Via La Fontaine, rises up to the piano nobile. Above the mullioned windows are various heraldic coat of arms, including those of the Alessandri family.
