= Santi Giuseppe e Teresa, Viterbo =

Deconsecrated church in Viterbo, Italy

Santi Giuseppe e Teresa
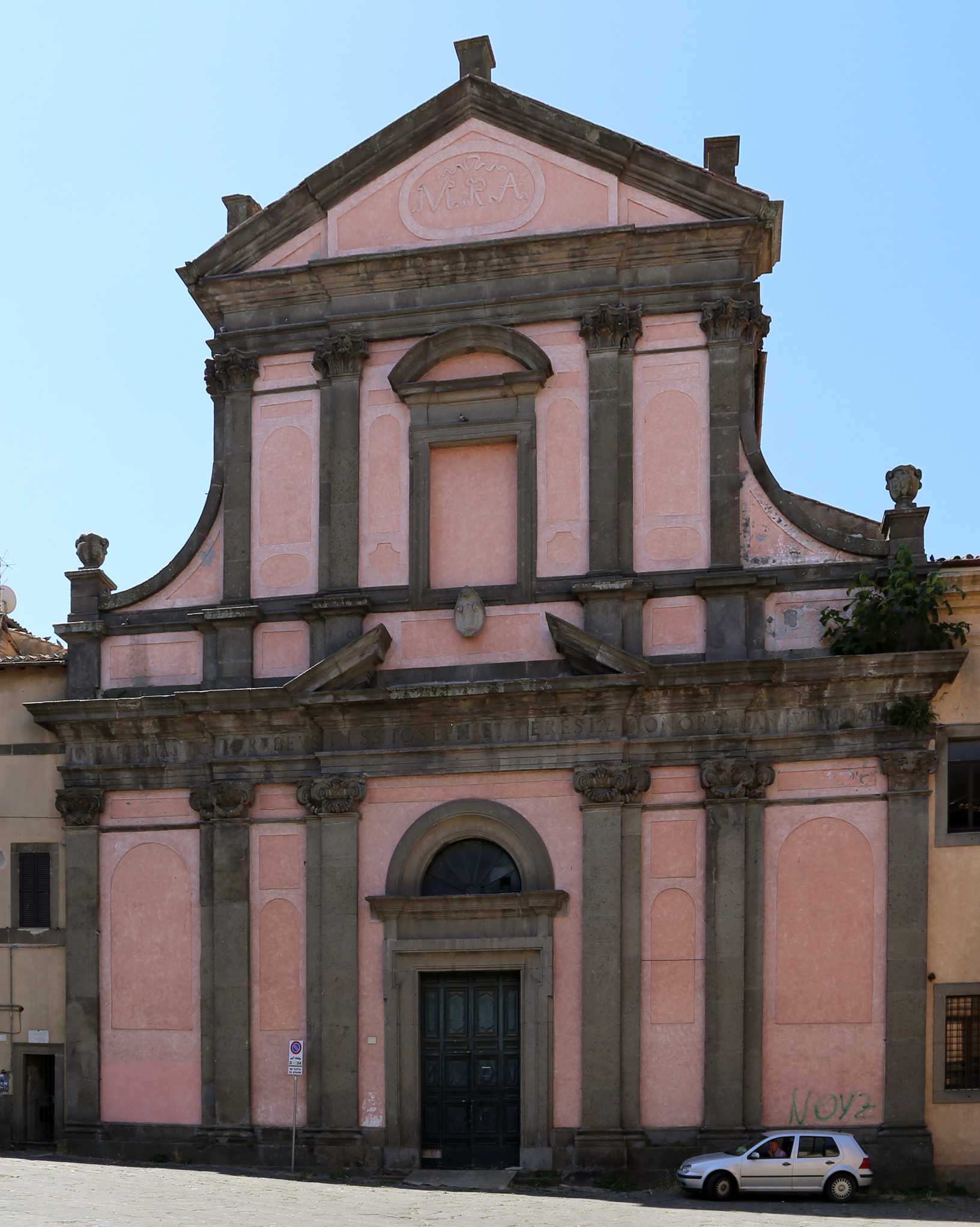
- Façade

Religion
- Affiliation: deconsecrated Roman Catholic
- Ecclesiastical or organizational status: Unclear

Location
- Location: Piazza Fontana Grande #40, Viterbo, region of Lazio, Italy
- Interactive map of Santi Giuseppe e Teresa
- Coordinates: 42.41497°N 12.10709°E

Architecture
- Type: Church
- Style: Baroque

Santi Giuseppe e Teresa is a Baroque-style, deconsecrated Roman Catholic church in the historic Viterbo, regio of Lazio, Italy. The church is mainly vacant, with some municipal offices, and its fate undecided; amid the proposals are an open market or museum.

== History ==
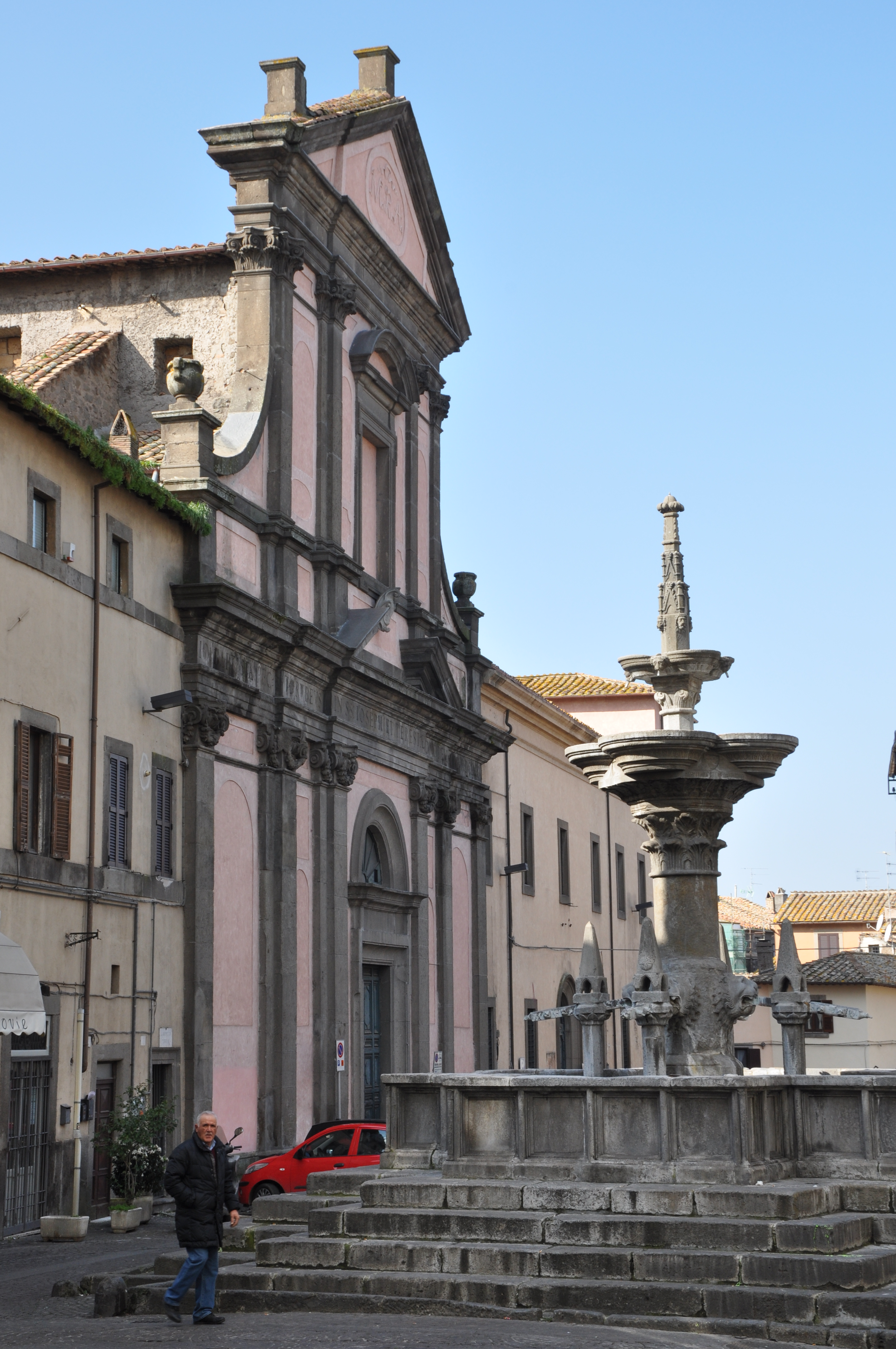
Façade with pink stucco and with Fontana Grande in forefront

The frieze on the church indicates the church was erected in 1675 by and adjacent to the Convent of the Discalced Carmelite nuns. Just diagonal to the facade is the Fontana Grande. South of the apse on Via La Fontaine, is the Palazzo Gatti. In the church is putatively buried the painter Giovanni Francesco Romanelli and Lorenzo da Viterbo. It was consecrated in 1725 by bishop Adriano and built with the patronage of Giovan Battista Pettirosso. The church in the 19th-century became a Palace of Justice (Aula di Giustizia) and Court of Assize, and so functioned till 2005. The Judge's dais was located at the main altar, and cages for the accused were inside side chapels. The church hosted the Cuocolo Trial in 1911 and the trial of the Giuliano band in the 1950s. Altarpieces from the church are now in the civic museum.
