= Fontana di Piano Scarano, Viterbo =

Fountain in Viterbo

Coordinates: 42.41264°N 12.10357°E

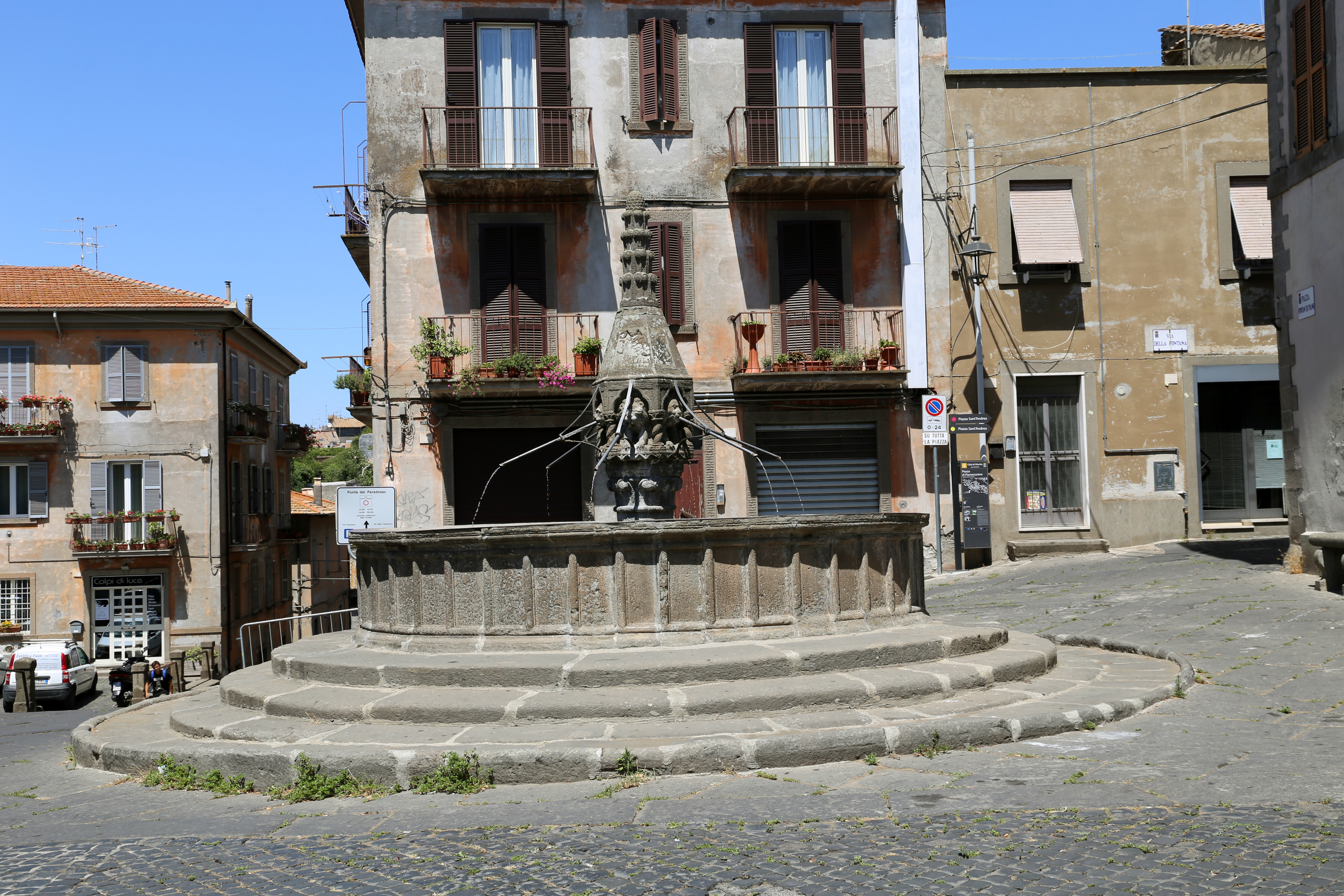
Fountain of Piano Scarano

The Fontana di Piano Scarano, sometimes shortened to Fontana di Piano is a medieval fountain located in a piazza located two blocks north of Porta Carmine, inside the city walls of Viterbo, region of Lazio, Italy.

== History ==
The fountain was originally constructed in the mid-14th century, but in 1367 it was destroyed during a brief rebellion. The story is that Pope Urban V (al secolo born Guillaume de Grimoard), was travelling from Avignon to Rome to assert his rule over papal territory, recently reacquired for the papacy by Cardinal Albornoz; the pope and his large entourage stopped in Viterbo, which had been dispossessed from the rule of the di Vico family. The accompanying French cardinals and troops were likely not very welcome to the population of Viterbo. Entering the walls of Viterbo through the Porta Carmine, after the pope had passed an aide to the Cardinal of Carcassonne washed a pet dog in the basin of this fountain. This provoked a rebellion by the local neighborhood, that beset the accompanying cardinals, in which the fountain was destroyed. Riots lasted two days, and the Pope and his Cardinals sought refuge in the Rocca Albornoz. The pope's response to the event was harsh; imprisoning over fifty citizens, razing houses and raising the walls protecting the neighborhood. After visiting Rome, Pope Urban V would die en route back to Avignon; the Di Vico family would briefly reassert itself in Viterbo.

The fountain has a round basin surmounted by a column with a circle of lions (symbol of Viterbo) inside individual porticos, and topped with a hexagonal cone with bas-reliefs of saints and bishops.
