= Tarquinio Ligustri =

Italian painter

- Martyrdom of St. Protasius, 1603, San Vitale, Rome
- Born: August 1564; Viterbo, Papal States
- Died: c. 1620; Rome, Papal States
- Occupation: Painter
- Movement: Mannerism

Tarquinio Ligustri (August 1564 – c. 1620) was an Italian painter, active during the late-Mannerist period, active mainly around Viterbo and Rome.

== Biography ==
Tarquinio Ligustri was born in Viterbo, where he was baptized on 8 August 1564. It is not clear where and with whom he was trained, but his examples similar to his landscape paintings would have been visible nearby at the Farnese palace of Caprarola and the villa of Cardinal Gianfrancesco Gambara at Bagnaia.

His first documented works were frescoes painted for the Sala Regia of the Palazzo dei Priori in Viterbo, beginning in 1587. In the next two years, he would end up decorating, along with Giovanni Antonio Mussi, Ludovico Nucci, and Baldassarre Croce, the stairs accessing the piano nobile. The quadratura is attributed to Ligustri, as are the vedute of castled towns near Viterbo. A detailed engraving of the city of Viterbo, dedicated to Cardinal Odoardo Farnese, was produced in 1596. He also engraved a vedute of the Villa Lante, Bagnaia, dedicated to cardinal Alessandro Peretti di Montalto.

By 1598, he appears to have moved to Rome. There he helped in the decoration of the chapel dedicated to the Immaculate Conception in San Silvestro in Capite. He helped decorate the vaults of the church of Santa Cecilia in Trastevere. In 1599, he contributed ten landscapes with scenes of martyrdoms for the church of San Vitale. In 1600 he painted quadratura, as part of a team of painters led by Cristoforo Roncalli, for the palace of Asdrubale Mattei (Palazzo Mattei di Giove). He painted frescoes in a room of the Palazzo della Cancelleria, then occupied by Cardinal Peretti. Between 1602 and 1603, Ligustri painted the vaults of a gallery in Palazzo Massimi. In 1604, he was appointed secretary of the Academy of San Luca. In 1606, he painted a frieze in the gallery of the Palace of Cardinal Ottavio Paravicini alle Stimmate, today Besso. The last documented work of Ligustri was in 1607-1613: the decoration of the vault of the Alli Maccarani chapel in San Marcello al Corso. In 1616, he was paid for drawings by Giovan Angelo Altemps. Subsequent works, including the stories of Tusculum in the Farnese loggia of the Grottaferrata abbey, which were more likely painted by Cornelis Loots.

An entry in the registry of San Lorenzo in Lucina suggests he died by 1615, although the biographer Baglione has him living in 1621 at the end of the papacy of Paul V. Ligustri was the teacher of Bartolomeo Cavarozzi, and introduced him to the aristocratic Crescentii family, who became his lifelong patrons.

=== Paintings ===
The Battle of Jericho, 1603, San Vitale, Rome

The Forty Martyrs of Sebaste, 1603, San Vitale, Rome

King David, 1603, San Vitale, Rome

== Bibliography ==
- Guerrieri Borsoi, Maria Barbara (2005). "LIGUSTRI, Tarquinio". Dizionario Biografico degli Italiani (in Italian). Vol. 65: Levis–Lorenzetti. Rome: Institute of the Italian Encyclopaedia. ISBN 978-88-12-00032-6.
