= Palazzo Mazzatosta, Viterbo =

Palace in Viterbo, Italy

Coordinates: 42.41712°N 12.10724°E

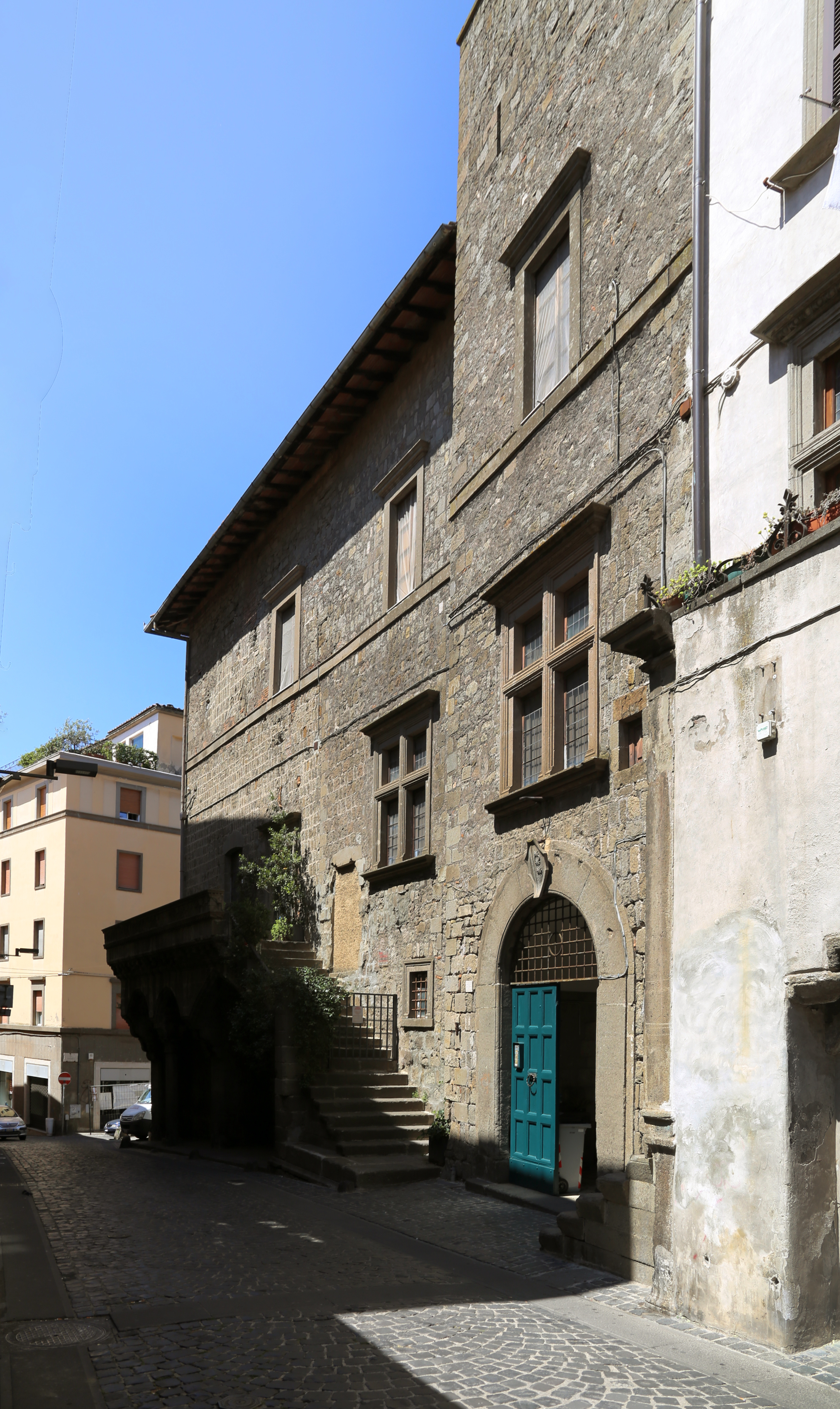
Palazzo Mazzatosta, balcony is heavily shaded in photo

The Palazzo Mazzatosta is a 13th-century aristocratic palace located on Via del Orologio in central Viterbo, region of Lazio, Italy. It has had numerous owners, and thus has been denominated the House (Casa) or Palazzetto (Small Palace) of the following families:

- Capocci
- Vico
- Sacchi
- Mazzatosta
- Cecchini

The initial palace, originally a fortified medieval house with a tower, was refurbished by the militant Cardinal Raniero Capocci circa 1230–1240. While the Cardinal became a fervent Guelph, he had hosted both Pope Gregory IX in 1236 and Emperor Frederick II in 1240 at this palace. Frederic would besiege the city in 1234, and it would be successfully defended under the leadership of Capocci. In 1247, Frederick of Antioch, the illegitimate son of the emperor, had recaptured the city, and this led to the palace falling nearly to ruin.

In 1260, the next owner Francesco Vico, donated the house to the Dominican convent of Santa Maria in Gradi (now occupied by University of Tuscia). It was however reassigned to Giovanni Sacchi, treasurer for Pope Boniface VIII. In 1375, the palace was owned by Angelo Tavernini. By the 15th-century, the palace was owned by members of the Mazzatosta who enlarged the rooms at the expense of the courtyard. enlarged the building again, using interior spaces and thus reducing the courtyards or richiastri. Nardo and Bartolomeo Mazzatosta, the treasurer of Pope Eugene IV owned the castle in the 16th-century. From 1560, the palace was owned by Giacomo Sacchi, physician (archiatra) of Pope Pius IV.

The stone block balcony has heraldic arms of the Sacchi family (two bags); of the Caetani Anagni family (wavy stripes), which included Pope Boniface VIII; of the Capocci family (blue band on a gold background). The south facade, opening to a small piazzeta, has various buried arches from prior constructions.

By the end of the 18th-century, the building was poorly maintained. In 1930, when the daughter of the Cecchini family married the successful lawyer Mario Scappucci the palace was refurbished. It suffered grave damage during the Second World War, but has been rebuilt. A notable feature of the palace is the large balcony on Via del Orologio.
