= Giacomo Cordelli =

Italian painter

Giacomo Cordelli was an Italian painter, active circa 1600–1620.

== Biography ==
He was born in Viterbo, and is known for the lunette frescoes, depicting old-testament subjects, in the choir adjacent to the Augustinian church of the Santissimi Trinita in the town. The style is a late-mannerist style, somewhat crude and recalling the style of painting used on maiolica. The subjects include:

- Samson drinks from the jawbone of an ass
- Into the Philistine grain fields, Samson releases the jackals (or wolves) with flames tied to their tails
- Samson carries away the portals of Gaza
- Shadrach, Meshach, and Abednego in the Furnace
- Habakkuk, transported by the angel, brings food to Daniel in the lion's den
- Abraham and the three angels

The frescoes depicting the life of Saint Augustine were painted by Marzio Ganassini. Some sources attribute to him engineering works.
