= Ludovico Nucci =

Italian painter

Ludovico Nucci was an Italian painter, active circa 1592 in Viterbo.

== Biography ==
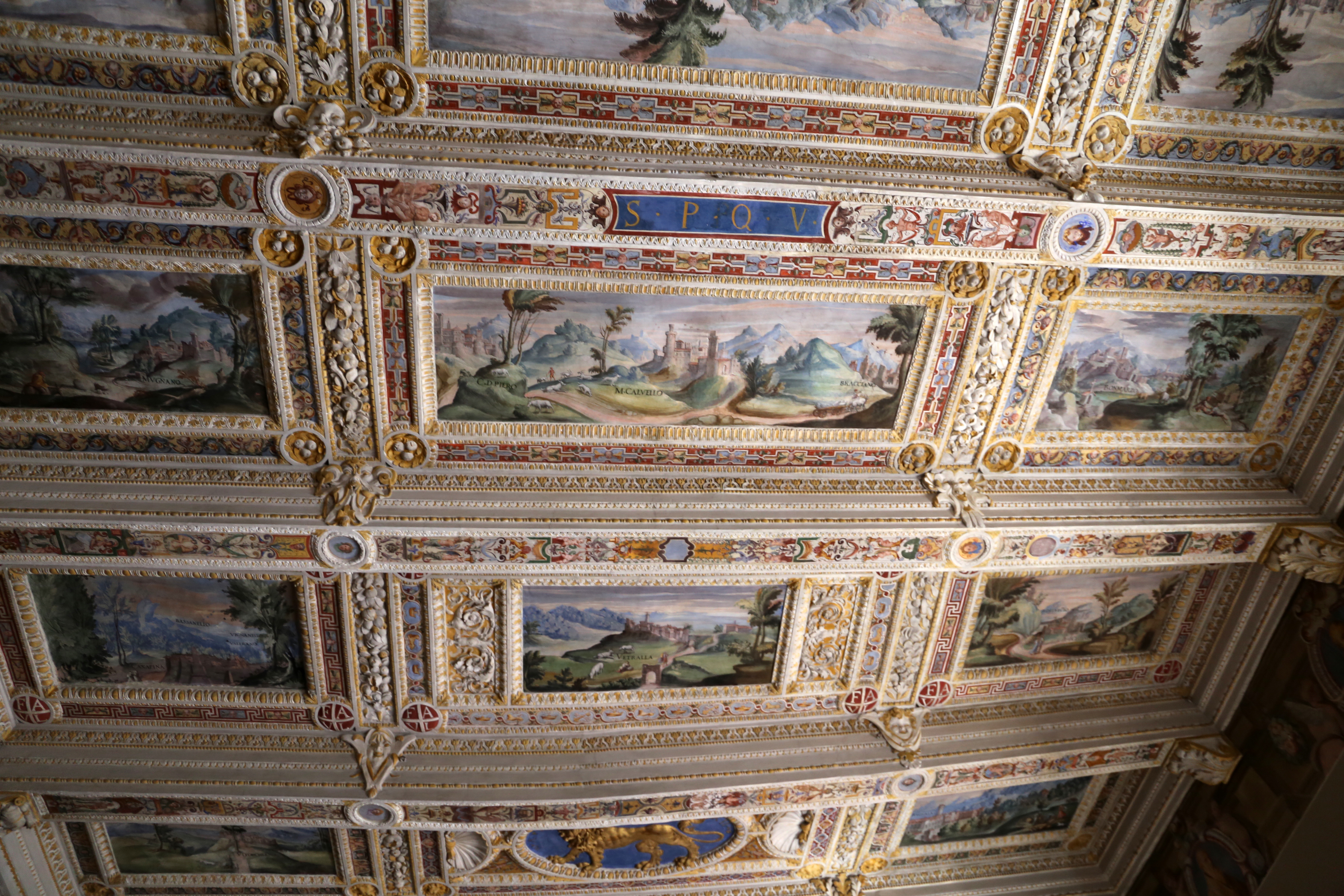

He is known for the ornamental elements of the frescoes in the ceiling of the Sala Regia of the Palazzo Communale of Viterbo. The figures were completed by Tarquinio Ligustri. The frescoes depict 33 castles and feuds under the governance of Viterbo.
