= Giovanni di Vico =

Italian Ghibelline leader and lord (died 1366)

Giovanni di Vico (died 1366) was an Italian Ghibelline leader, lord of Viterbo, Vetralla, Orvieto, Narni and numerous other lands in northern Lazio and Umbria. He is the most famous member of the Prefetti di Vico family.

== Biography ==
Giovanni is mentioned for the first time in 1322. In 1337 he inherited the charge of prefect of Rome from his father Manfredi. The following year he entered Viterbo, killing his brother Faziolo, who had remained loyal to the Pope. Giovanni was named Imperial vicar of Latium by emperor Louis IV of Bavaria, confirmed in 1342 by Pope Clement VI.

However, increasing contrasts with the latter drove him to an open rebellion in 1344, in which he expanded his lordship. After a short reconciliation, in 1347 Cola di Rienzo, senator of Rome, declared Giovanni a rebel and waged war against him. Assailed by 7,000 men, he was forced to sue for a surrender, and to renounce his title of prefect. Giovanni was again arrested in Rome, twice, but was freed with the fall of Cola di Rienzo.

He thenceforth continued his ruthless policy of ravages against the Papal territories, refusing always to present himself in Avignon to respond for his deeds. In 1352 the Papal army attacked Viterbo; Giovanni resisted successfully in a siege of seven months, but was excommunicated. He was also initially victorious against Gil de Albornoz, the skillful Cardinal sent by Pope Innocent VI to conquer back the usurped territories of the Papal States, but in 1354 he was decisively defeated near Orvieto. After a short resistance in Viterbo, he surrendered and swore loyalty to Albornoz and the Church.

In March 1355 he accompanied Charles IV of Bohemia to Rome for his coronation as Holy Roman Emperor. Taking advantage of Charles' protection, he tried to spur new rebellions in the Papal territories, but was always countered by Albornoz. He continued to rage sporadically in Tuscany, Lazio and Umbria, and died in April 1366, excommunicated by the Church.
