= Gianni Scipione Rossi =

Italian journalist and essayist

Gianni Scipione Rossi (born November 9, 1953, in Viterbo, Italy) is an Italian journalist and essayist.

== Career ==
- Between 1968 and the early Seventies he was active in the liberal Democratic Student Movement and then in the youth organization of the MSI.
- In 1972, after graduating from the Amedeo Avogadro State Scientific High School in Rome, he enrolled in the Faculty of Political Sciences at Sapienza University.
- In 1973 he attended the 72nd AUC course at the Cesano Infantry School in Rome.
- In 1974, first appointed second lieutenant, he commanded the pioneer platoon in the 151st Rgt. of Infantry Sassari, stationed in Trieste.
- In 1975 he resumed his university studies and approached journalism, after his experiences in student political newspapers.
- He also worked with Roman television station Antenna 4 in 1976.
- In 1978, Rossi joined the editorial staff of the weekly OP-Osservatore Politico.
- He became a registered journalist in 1984 and joined the editorial staff of Secolo d'Italia.
- In 1988, he moved to Giornale d'Italia as head of the internal-foreign service.
- Rossi held various editorial positions and contributed to several newspapers, including Roma and Partecipare.
- In 1992, he joined RAI, the Italian public broadcaster, where he worked in various roles and hosted programs.
- Rossi played a key role in the digitalization of information production during his tenure at RAI.
- He served as director of RAI Parliament from 2011 to 2016, where he implemented several reforms.
- In 2018, Rossi became the director of the Italian Center for Higher Studies for Training and Updating in Radio and Television Journalism.
- He is currently a professor of radio journalism at the Perugia School of Journalism since December 2020.
