= Sant'Andrea Apostolo, Viterbo =

Italian church

Coordinates: 42.41223°N 12.10517°E

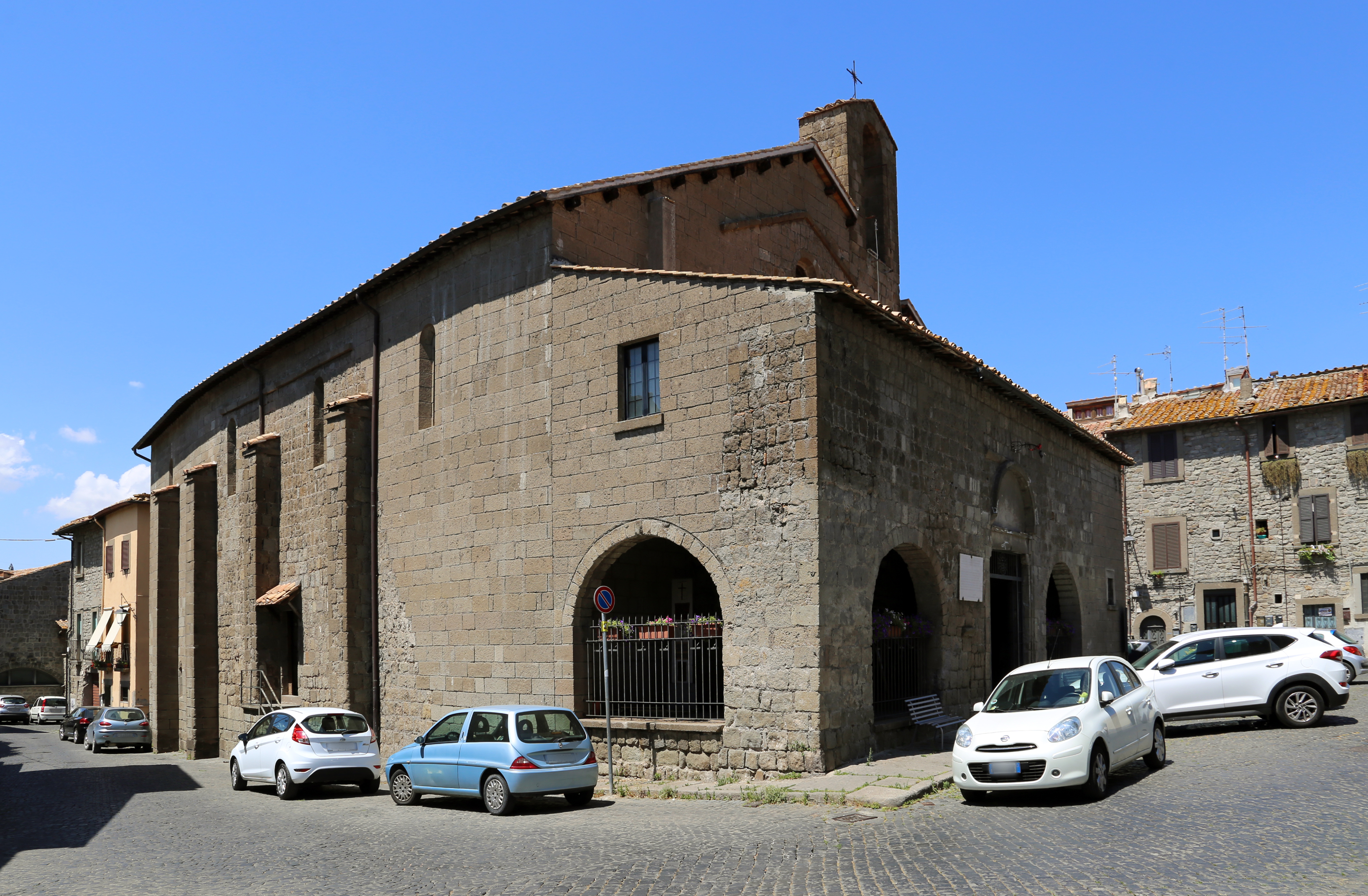
Flank and facade with portico

Sant'Andrea Apostolo is a Romanesque-style, Roman Catholic church located on the Piazza of the same name in the sector of Pianoscarano (or Piano Scarano) of Viterbo, region of Lazio, Italy.

== History and description ==
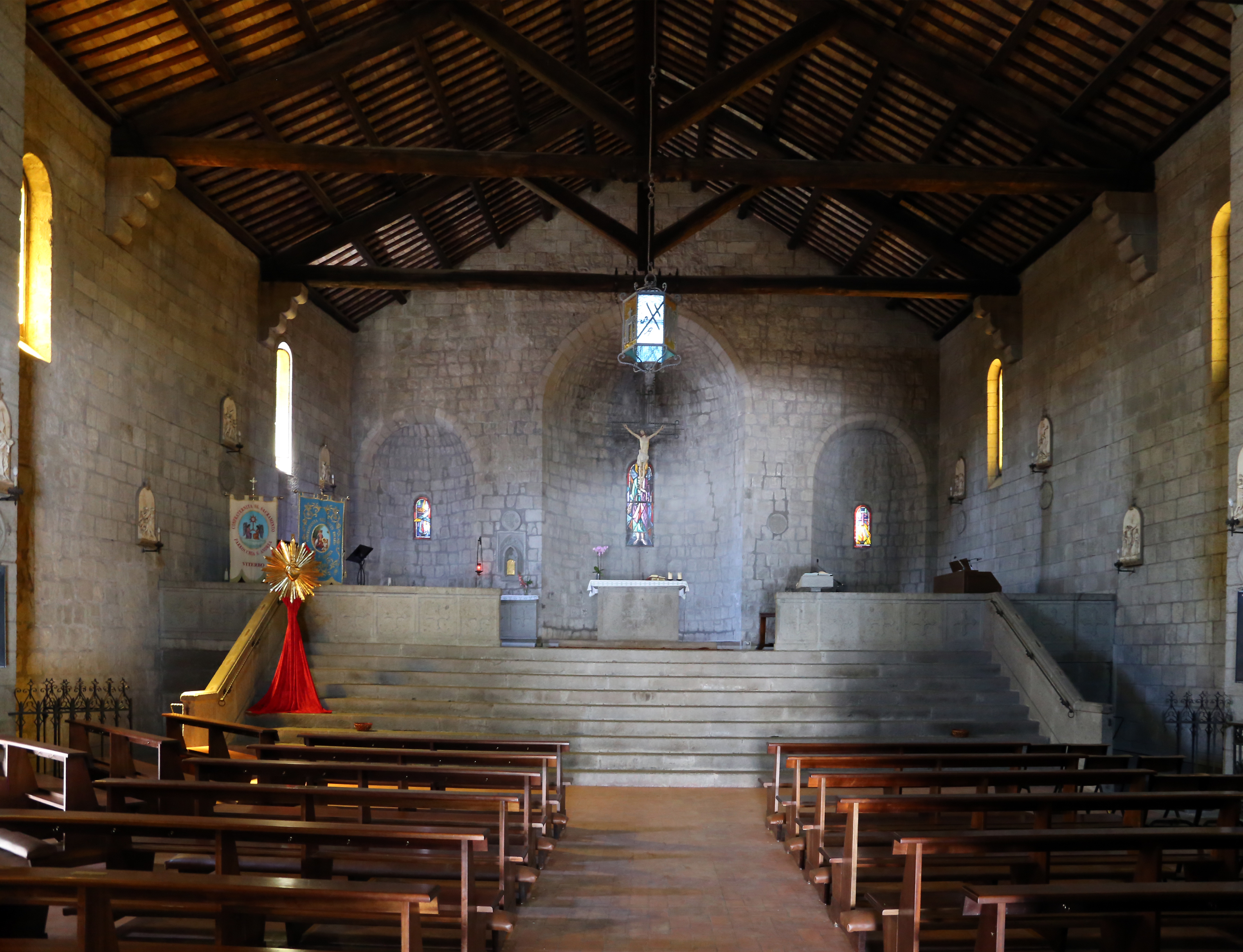
Interior nave facing apse

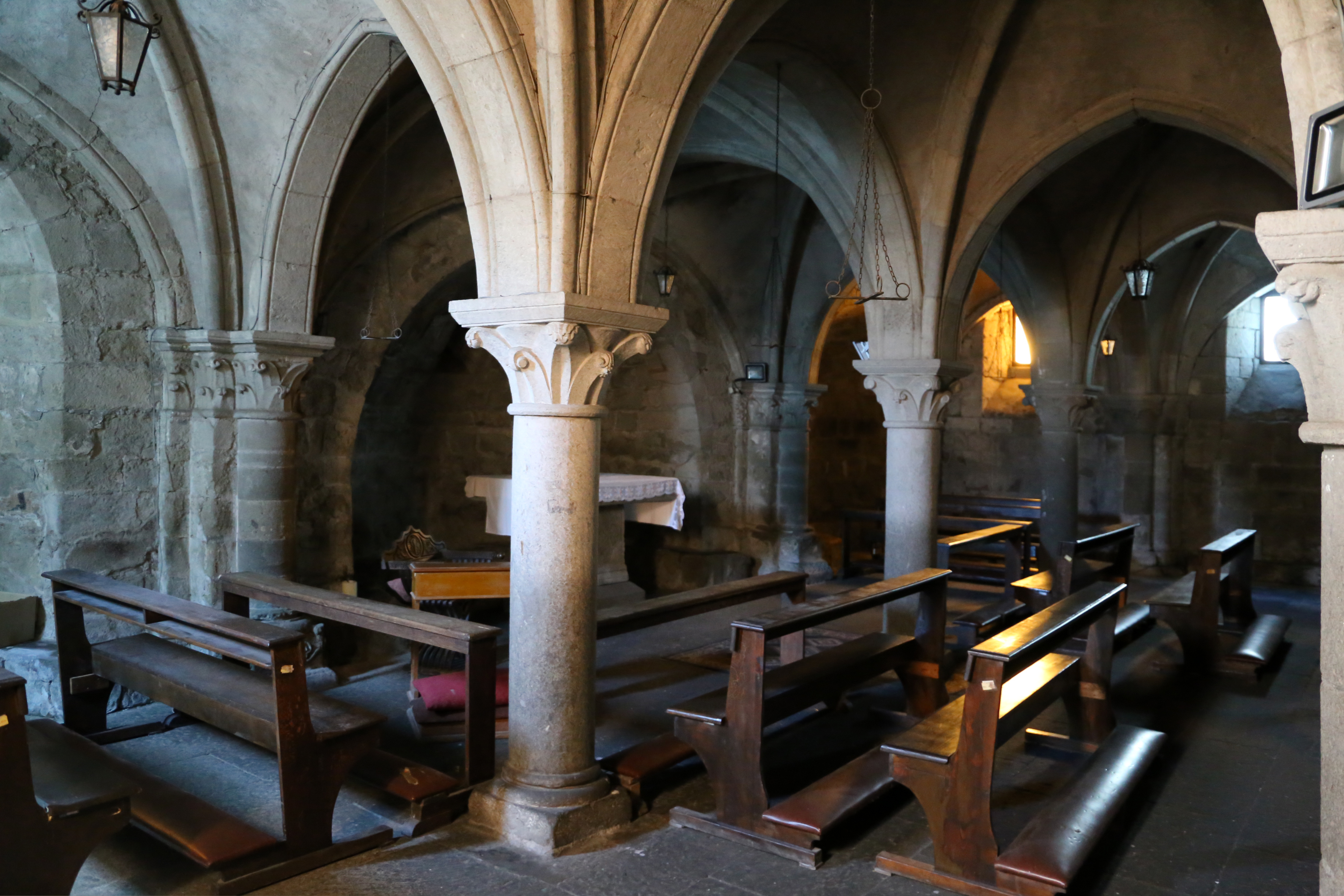
Crypt with 13th-century columns

Prior to the 12th-century, the land of this sector had once been mainly uninhabited, likely representing orchards owned by the Benedictine monasteries established in Viterbo by the Abbey of Farfa. In 1148, the land was transferred to the town of Viterbo. The sector of Pianoscarano was not urbanized until 1187. The church is first mentioned in 1236. The parish church of Sant'Andrea replaced a rustic pieve present here since the 9th century. The building has an irregular layout that reflects construction and enlargement over the centuries. By the 14th-century, the Ortolani's (Greengrocers) guild owned the Chapel of San Nicola. In the 15th-century, the Speziali's (Traders) guild had built the chapel of Saints Lawrence and Steven.

In 1902, a restoration patronized by Bishop Grasselli and led by the architect Filippo Pincellotti, refurbished both the church and the crypt, restoring the architectural elements to their respective Romanesque and Gothic roots.
