= Fontana Grande, Viterbo =

Fountain in Viterbo

Coordinates: 42.41495°N 12.10735°E

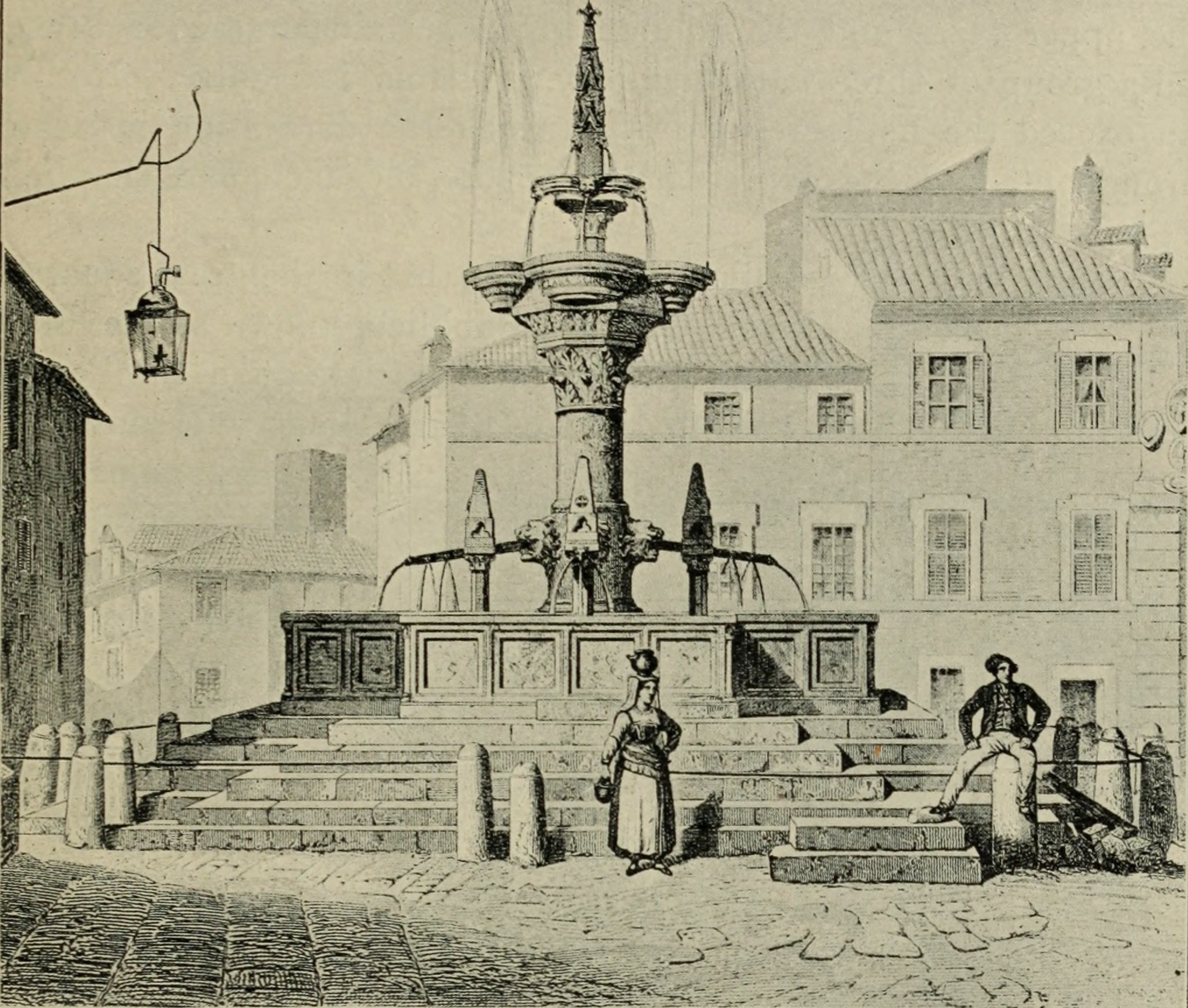
Drawing of the fountain from 1901

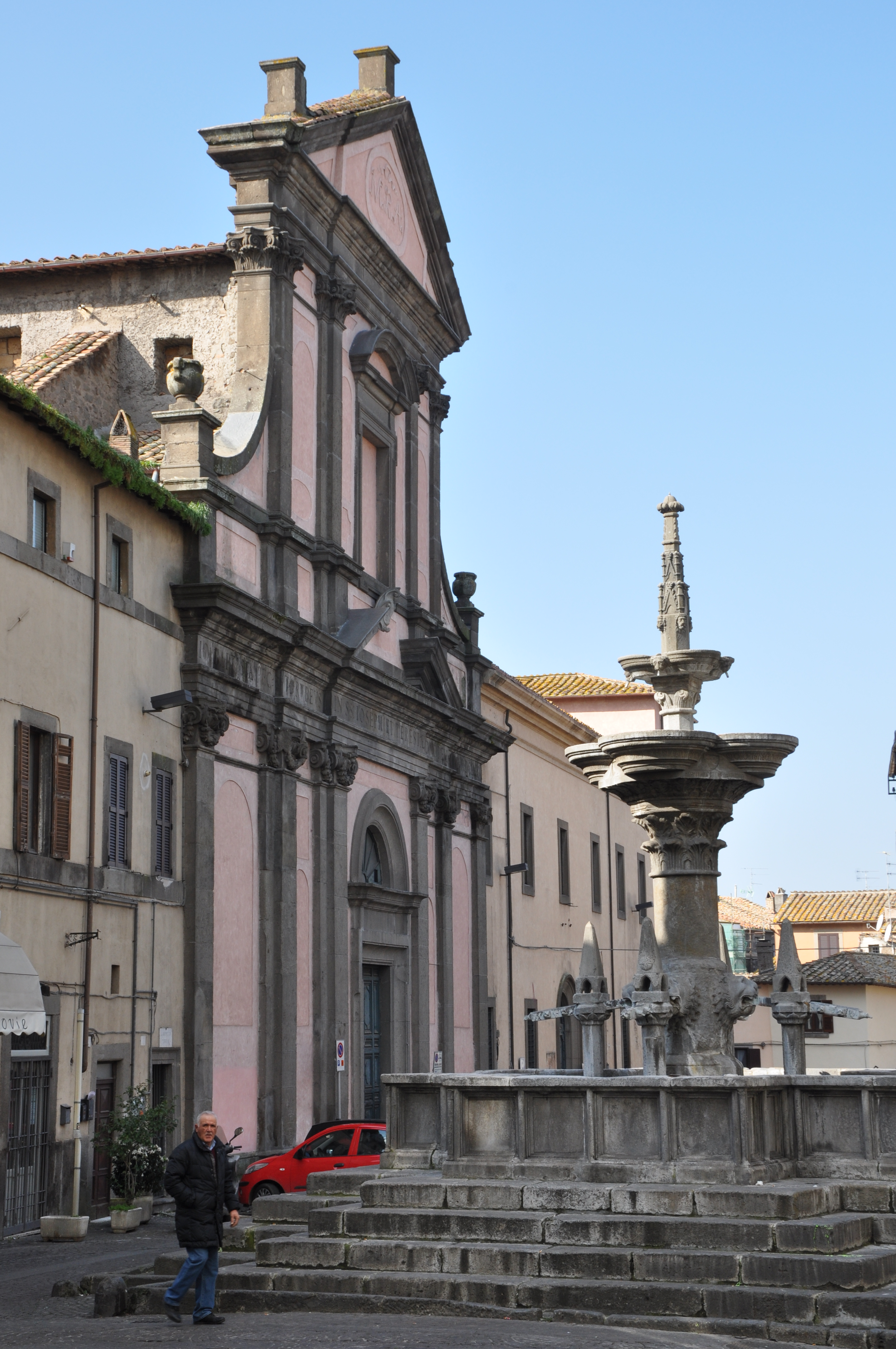
Fountain with the presently deconsecrated church of the Carmelitani Scalzi (Santi Giuseppe e Teresa in background

Fontana Grande or Large Fountain is a medieval fountain located in a piazza of the same name, and the intersection of via Garibaldi and via Cavour, in the historic center of Viterbo, region of Lazio, Italy.

== History ==
The fountain was commissioned in 1212 by the commune. The design and construction is attributed to the stonemasons, Pietro and Bertoldo di Giovanni, whose names appear in an epigraph placed on the lower basin of the fountain. The fountain replaced a fountain known as Fontem Sepalis (referring to flowerlike shape and documented in the Liber Censum of 1192). The Greek cross layout of the lower basin, as well as the central pillar on which two cups are stacked and topped by a finial, are due to refurbishments over the centuries including in 1279 and 1424. The four lion heads, symbols of Viterbo, were added in 1424. The pyramidal finial structures date to 1827 and were executed by architect Domenico Lucchi. The fountain was originally fed by a Roman aqueduct that entered the city near the church of San Sisto; construction of this aqueduct was attributed to the 1st century consul Mummio Nigro Valerio Vigeto to bring water to his Villa Calvisiana.
