= Santa Maria della Salute, Viterbo =

Italian church

Coordinates: 42.41736°N 12.10442°E

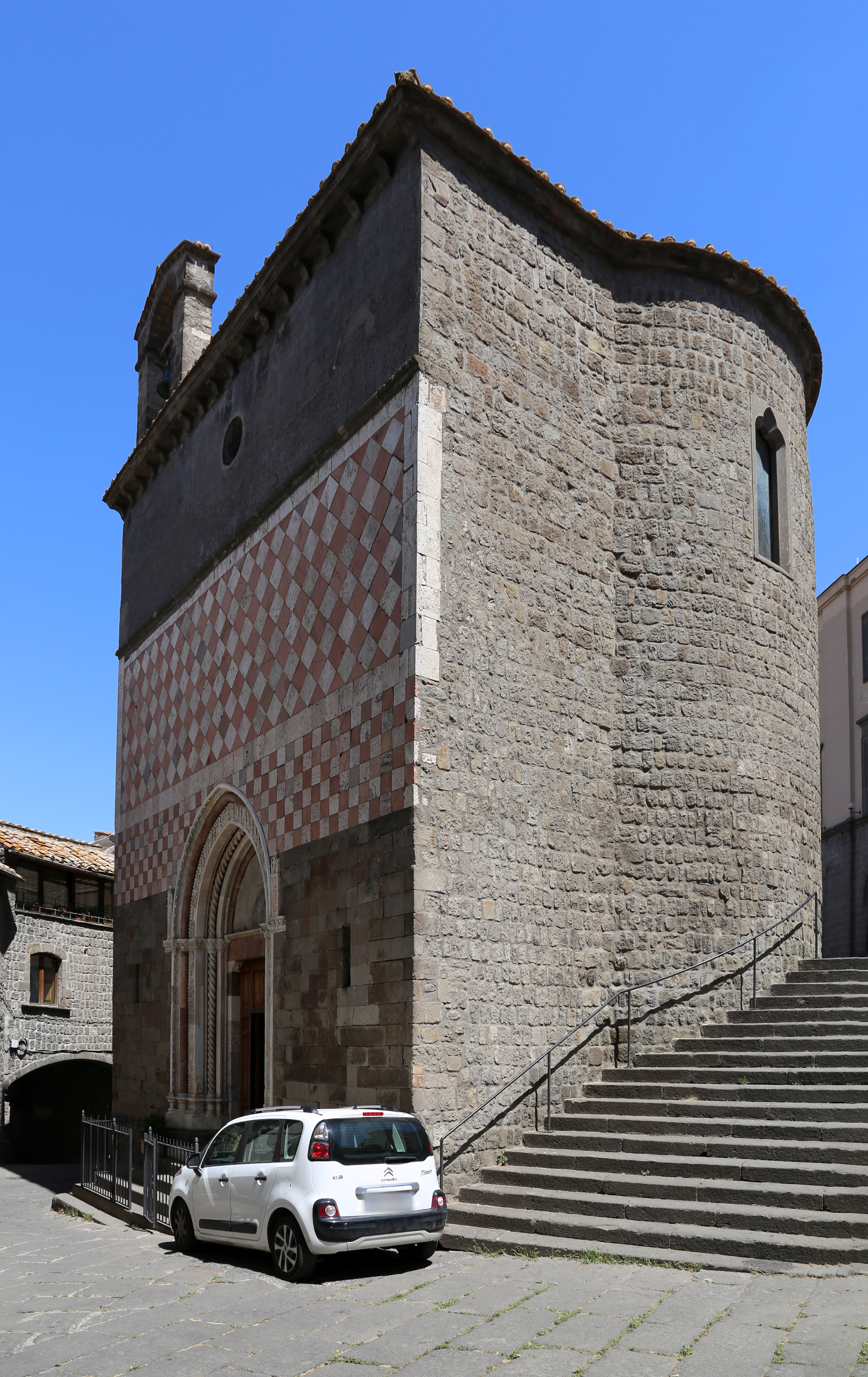
Church facade, southeastern exterior flank, and bell-tower

Santa Maria della Salute is a small Gothic-style, deconsecrated Roman Catholic church located on Via della Pescheria in Viterbo, region of Lazio, Italy. Today the church is often used as an exhibition hall and for cultural events.

== History and description ==
In the first two decades of the 14th-century, the Franciscan order established a sizable footprint in Viterbo, building hospitals and churches. This site, then located outside the city walls, was the location of the town's prison, until Fardo of Ugolino of Uffreduccio, a wealthy local notary and Franciscan tertiary, circa 1313 commissioned this church to be erected as a chapel to an adjoining hospice. It was supported in that decade by bishop Angelo Tignosi. It appears to have been a hospice aiding indigent mothers as well as fallen and ill women. Putatively, the hospice was set up on a portion of the former Via di Valle Piatta, which was part of the pilgrimage routes of the region, but also was frequented by prostitutes. The hospice of Santa Maria of Salute was administered by Franciscans of the 3rd Order until abandoned in 1324. This occurred after the activities of the hospice were opposed by townspeople. Master Fardo attempted to foster other charitable Christian efforts, including the conversion of the Jews, until retiring to a hospice hermitage on nearby Mount Cimini. After 1350, a bull of Pope Martin V entrusted the chapel and its endowment to a guild of lawyers, jurists, and notaries.

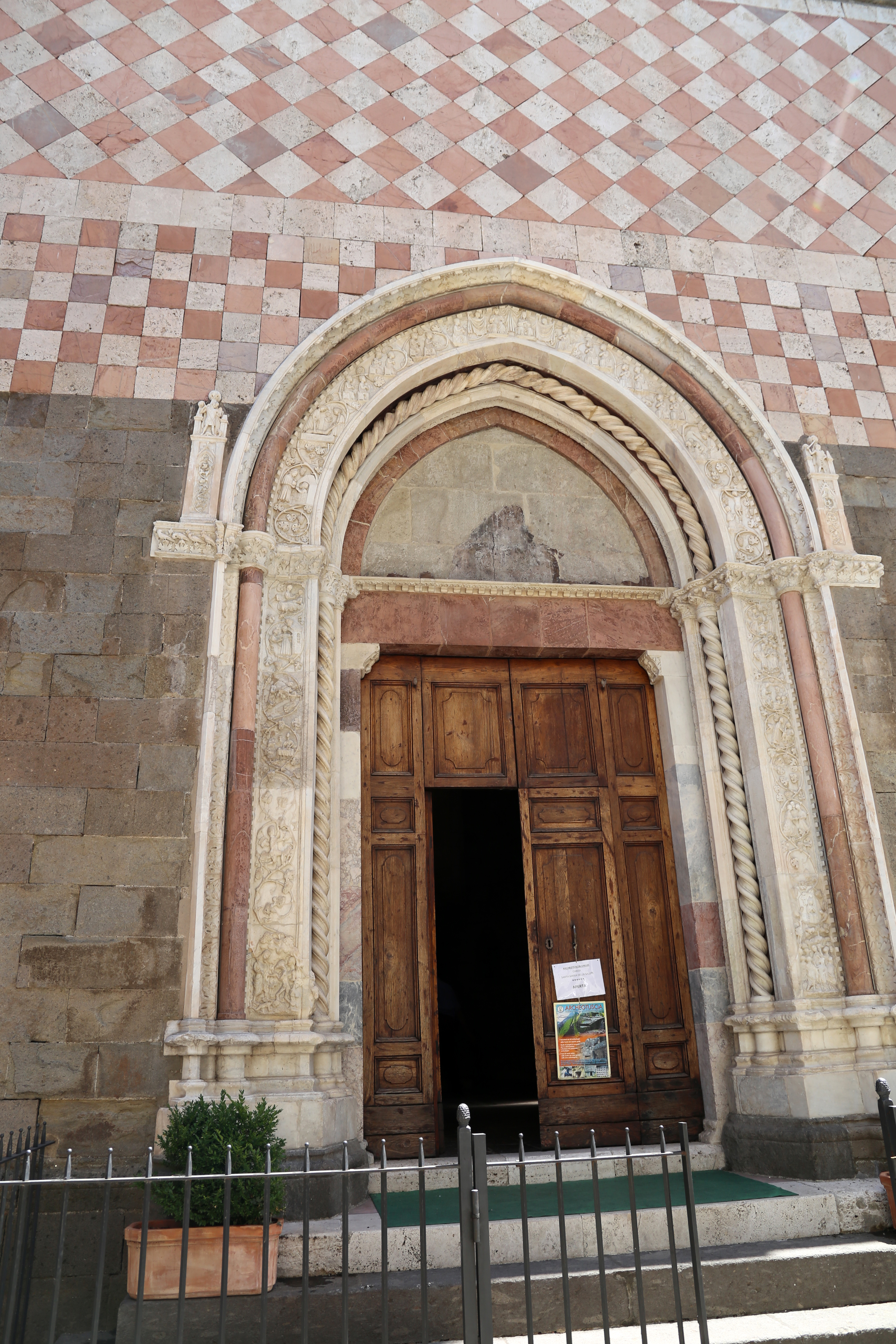
Facade portal

The church has a peculiar layout and decoration. The church is flanked on the right by a number of stairs. The flat almost square facade has a broad band of decorative alternately pink and white tiles in the midsection, partly in diamond fashion, part in strips of squares. At the top center is a small oculus, and flanking the portal are two small narrow windows. At the roofline is a small sail shaped bell-tower. The remainder of the facade and the other walls of the church are made of rectangular stone bricks.

The slightly pointed arched entry portal captures the attention with its intricate decorative program of relief structure. The inner pilaster is a Solomonic column. Along a frieze are medallions displaying the corporal and spiritual works of mercy (opere di misericordia) or sacraments. These are intertwined by a looping sculpted vine with grape clusters. At the top of the frieze, noblemen or rulers in their chairs or thrones pay homage to the Virgin and Jesus, who stand before an unveiled curtain.

Inside the church is a worn floor tombstone for master Fardo, decorated with the triangular symbol of his hospice.

== Gallery ==
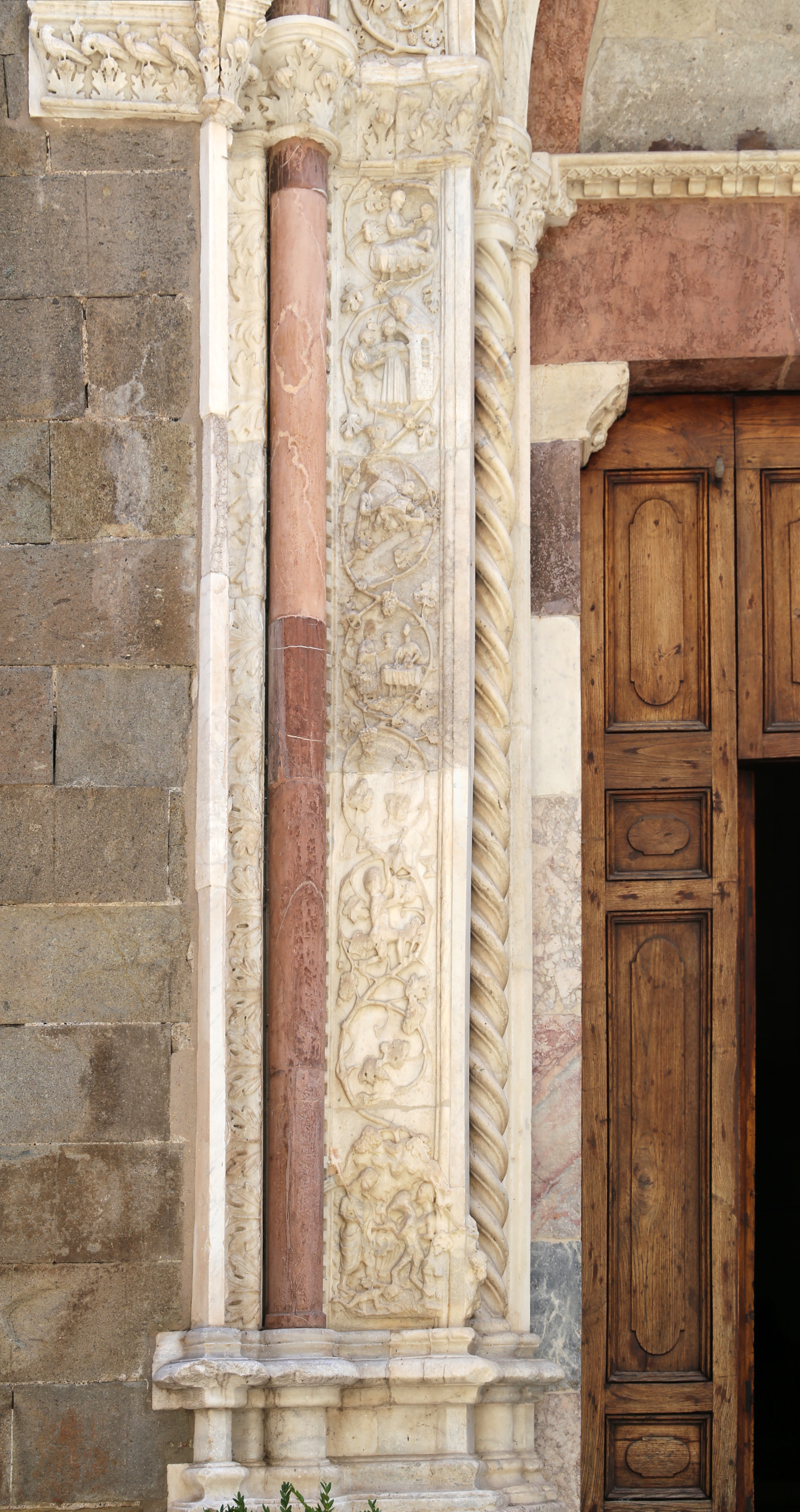
Medallions from left lower frieze with lowest representing Christ in Limbo

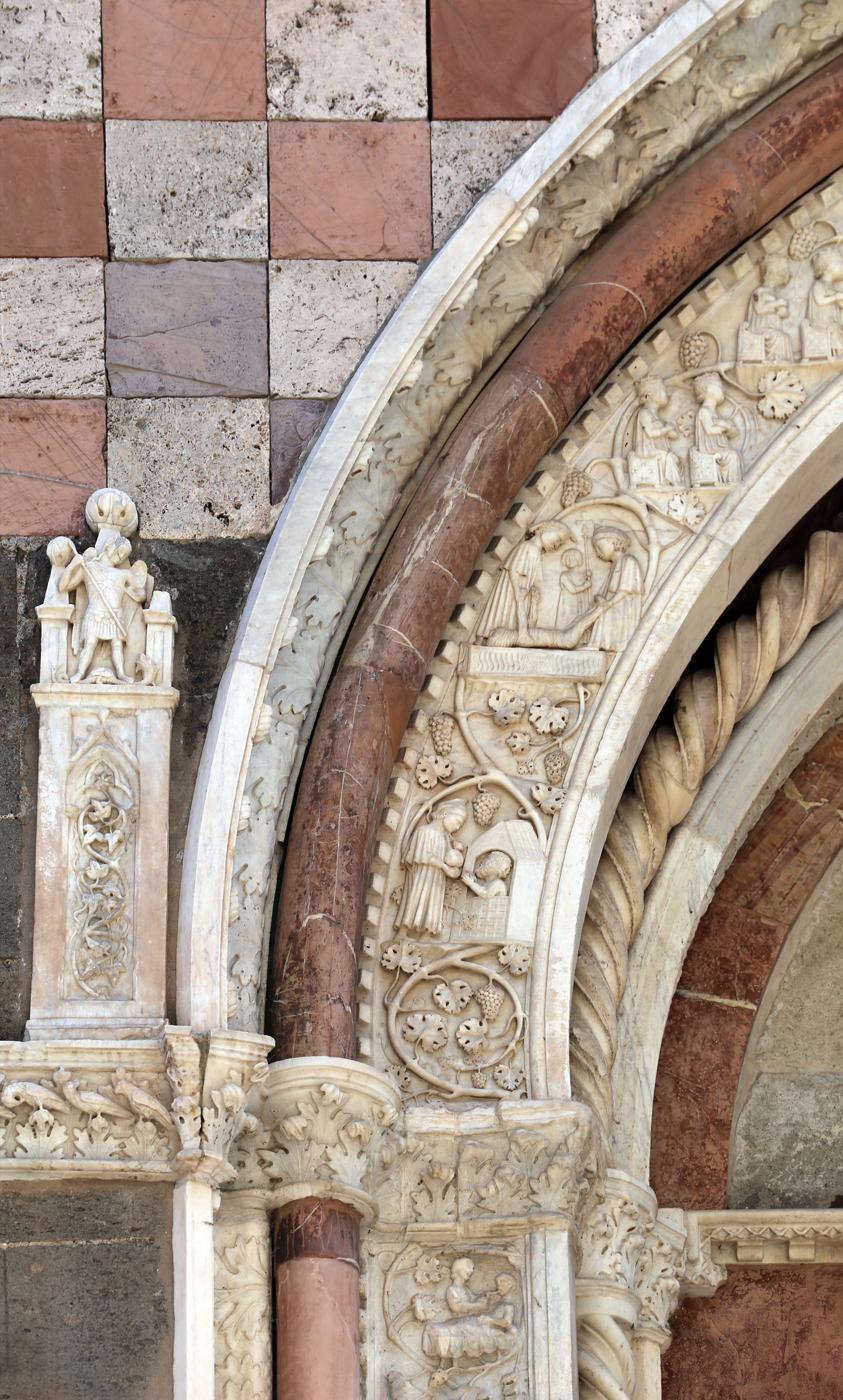
Medallions from left superior frieze of portal, depicting showing mercy by charity to the jailed, and by burying the dead; St George slaying the Dragon flanks the portal

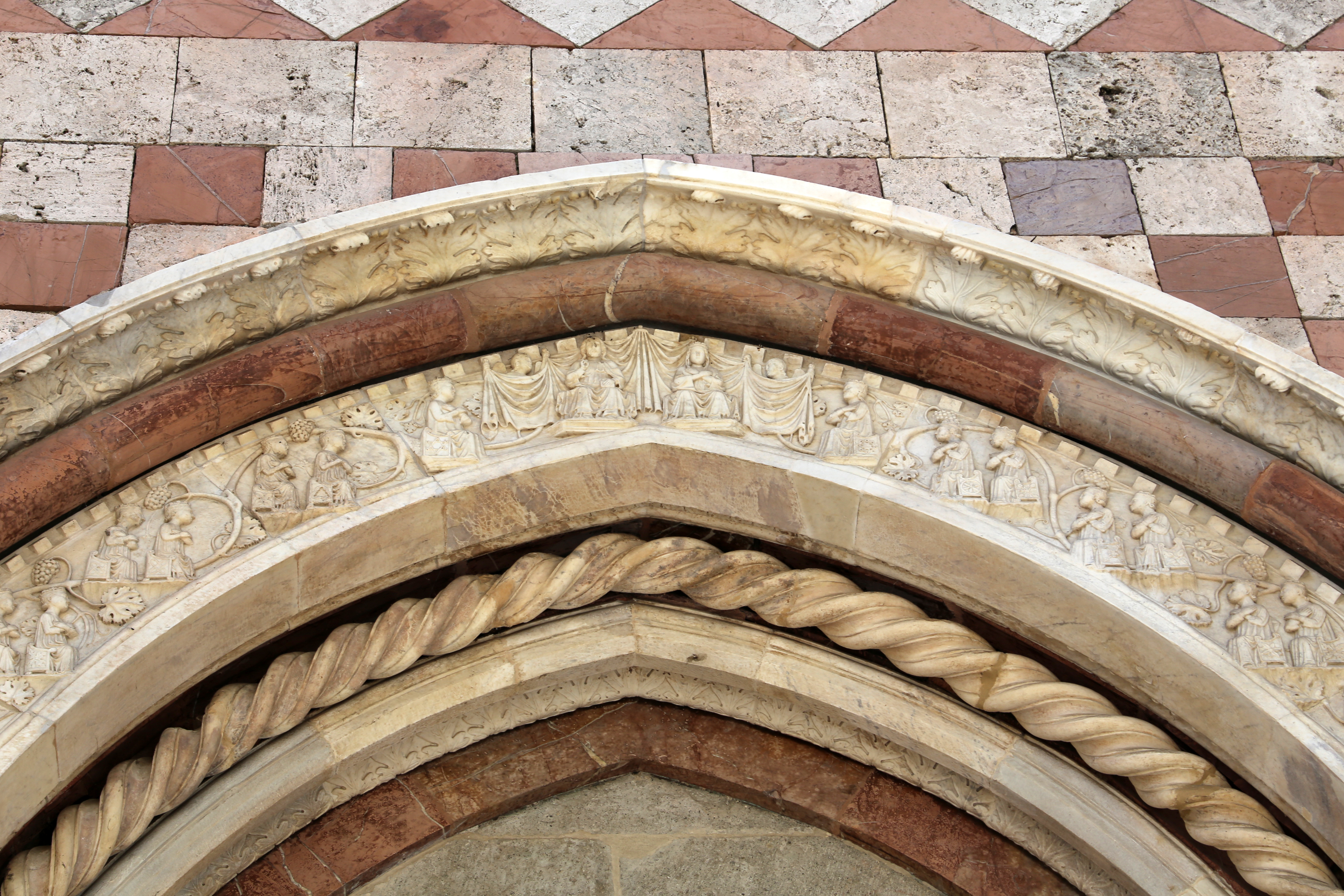
Adoration of Christ and the Virgin

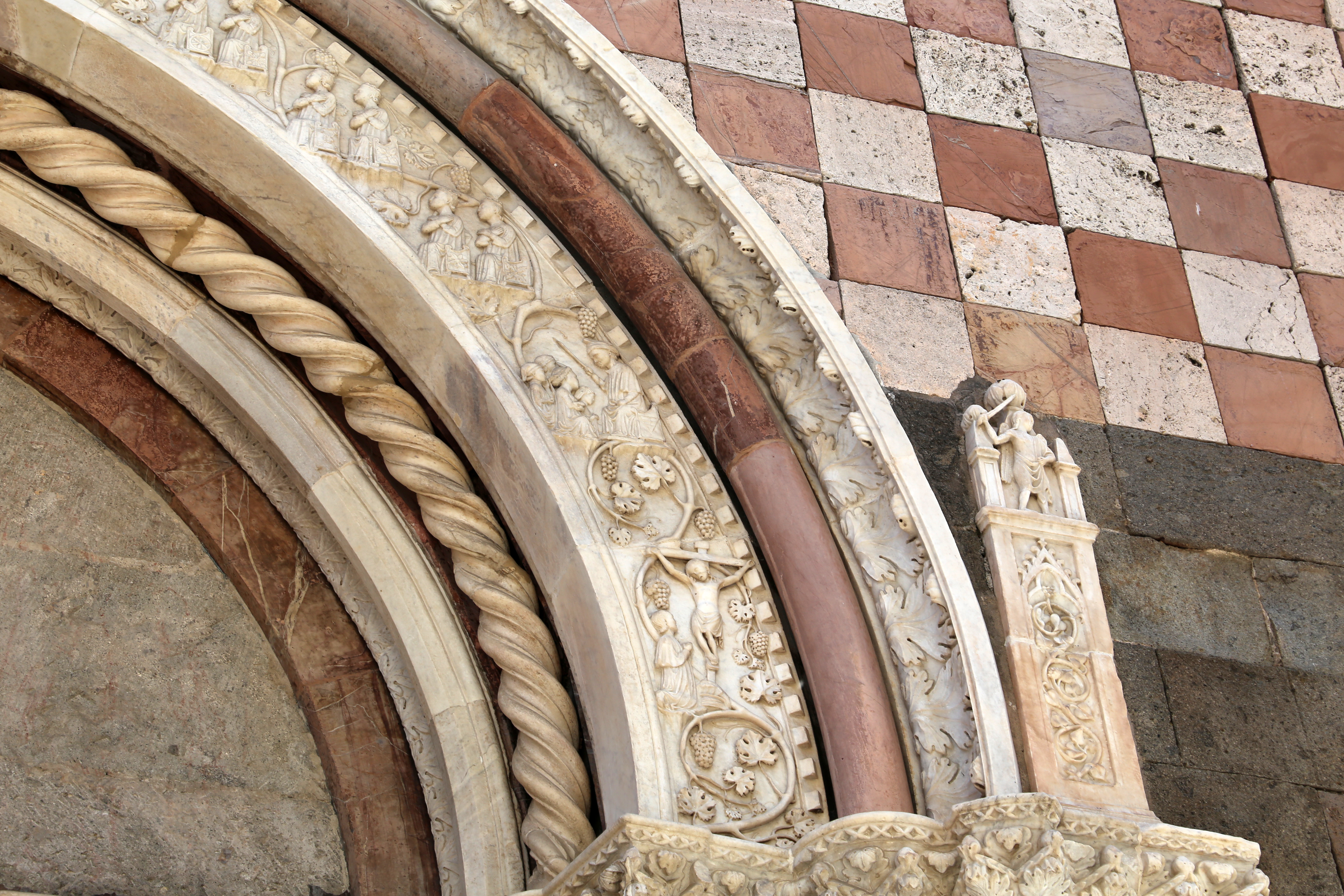
Medallions from right superior frieze of portal, depicting showing veneration of the crucifixion, and education of students; an Archangel flanks the portal

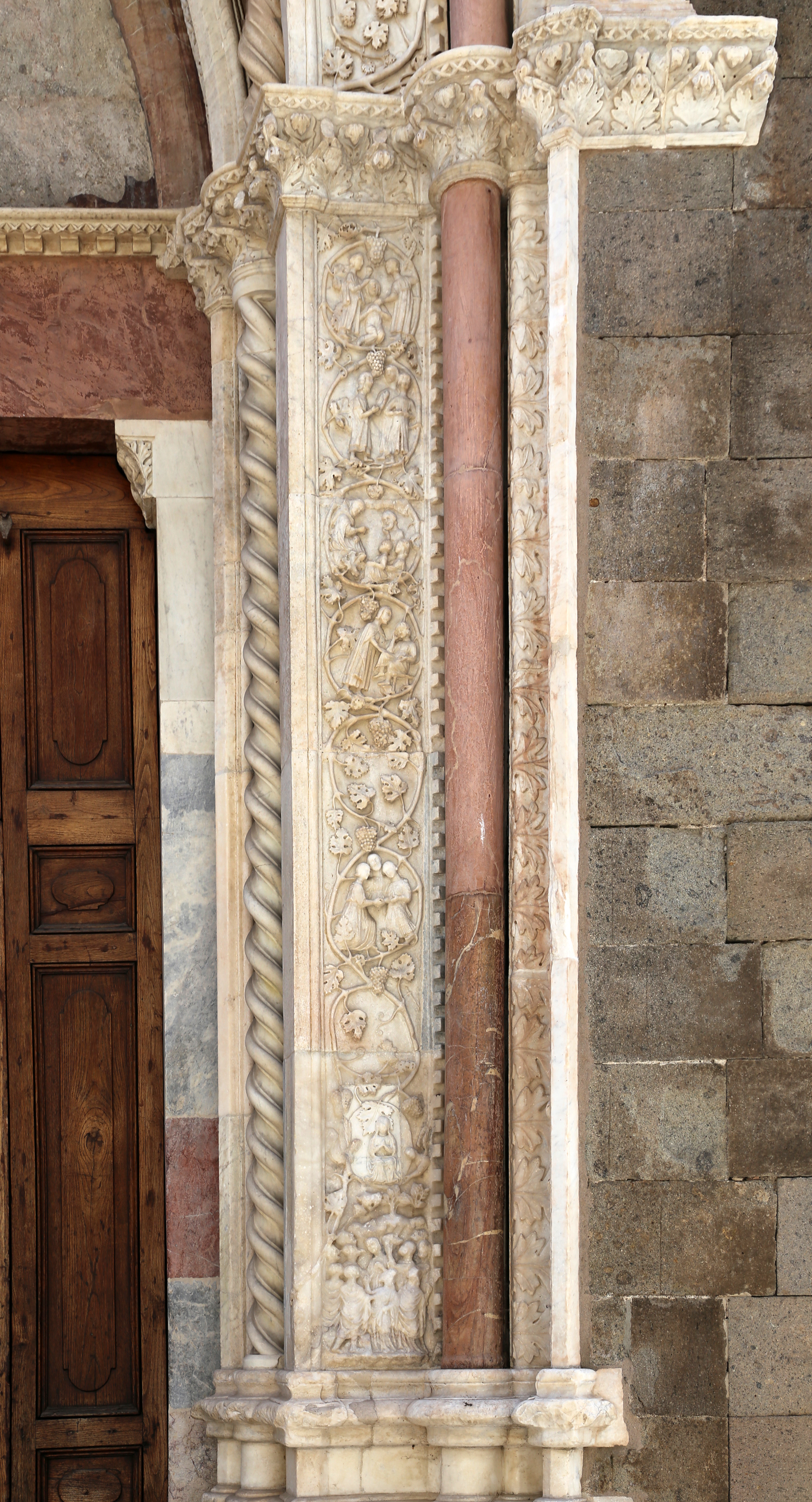
Medallions from right lower frieze
