= Prefetti di Vico =

Italian noble family

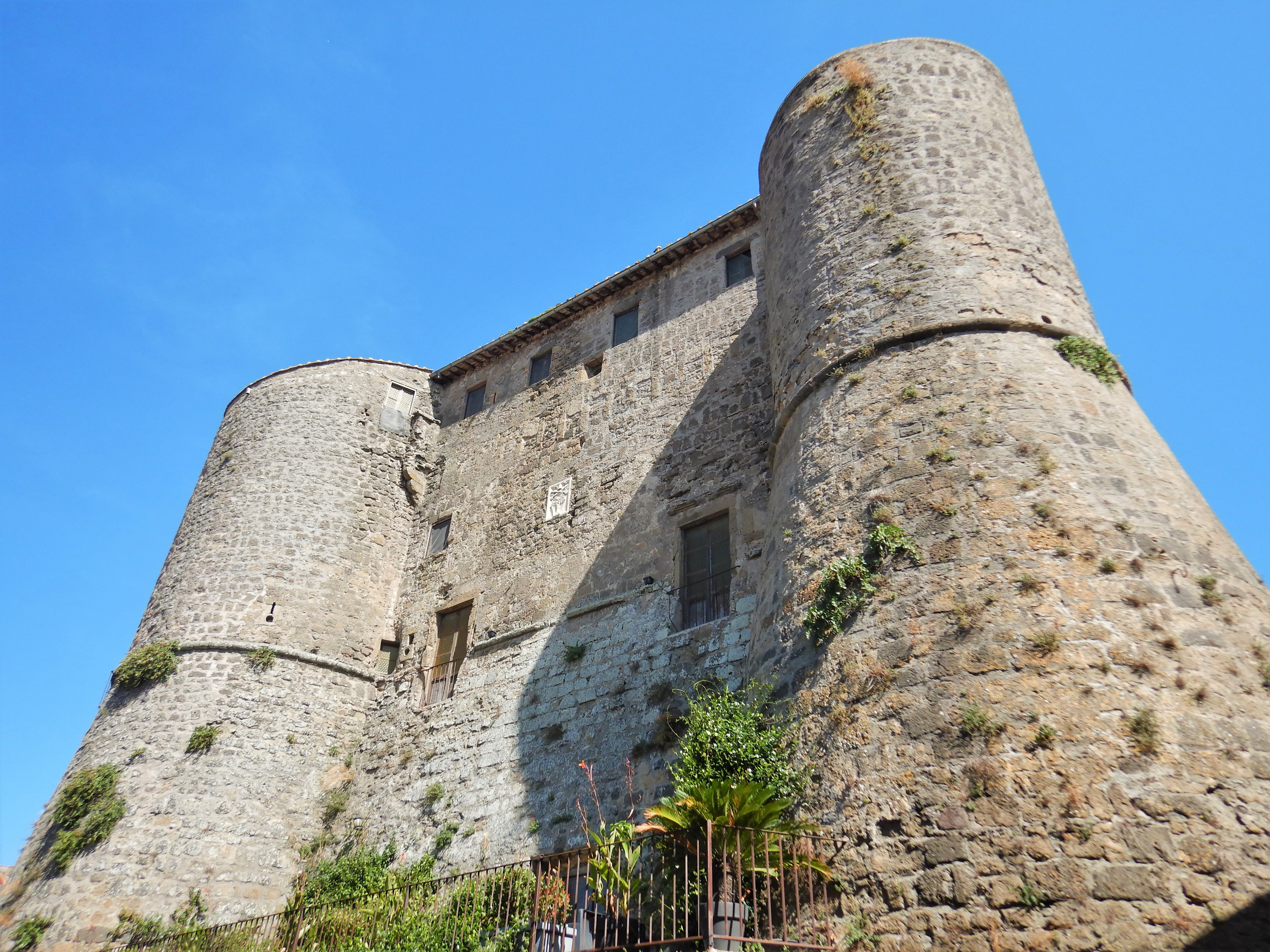
Ronciglione castle, owned by Prefetti di Vico family

The Prefetti di Vico was the name of an Italian noble family, of German origin, who established themselves in Rome from the 10th century.

== History ==
They obtained the title of praefect urbis (prefect of the city) by the Holy Roman Emperor. The rest of the name derived from the Lake Vico, in northern Lazio, where most of their lands were located.

The family members held the title until 1437, when the last member of the family was defeated by cardinal Giovanni Vitelleschi in the battle of Vetralla.

== Notable members ==
- Pietro di Vico (died 1268); an ally of King Manfred of Sicily, captured the castles and territories of San Giovenale (granted by the commune of Viterbo), Martignano, Stracciacappe, and Trevignano. Defeat by the lords of Bisenzio when attempting to acquire the castle of Marta. During this time the Prefetti di Vico were involved in the Ghibelline party, supporting Brancaleone degli Andalò in Rome and Ottaviano degli Ubaldini in Florence. The Preffeti di Vico came into conflict with the pope over disagreements over returning the title of Prefect and certain castles, leading to an excommunication from the Pope who proclaimed a crusade. After several battles and sieges with papal forces, Pietro captured Bisenzio, compelling Pope Urban IV to move from Orvieto to Perugia, during which he died. He may have commanded Manfred's army in a failed attack on Rome on 30 March 1265, defeated at Janiculum Hill. After attempting to arrest Charles of Anjou, the Prefetti defected to his side and made several concessions to him when he entered Rome in May. During Conradin's failed bid for Sicily, Pietro supported Conradin and was wounded in the battle of Tagliacozzo in 1268 and later died that year. Remembered by King Manfred and contemporary historian Saba Malaspina with the title of proconsul romanorum.
- Giovanni di Vico (died 1366); Ghibelline lord of several cities and communes in northern Lazio and Umbria. Fought in several conflicts with senator of Rome Cola di Rienzo and later the Papal States until his death. Most famous member of the family.
