= Viterbo =

- Comune
- Comune di Viterbo
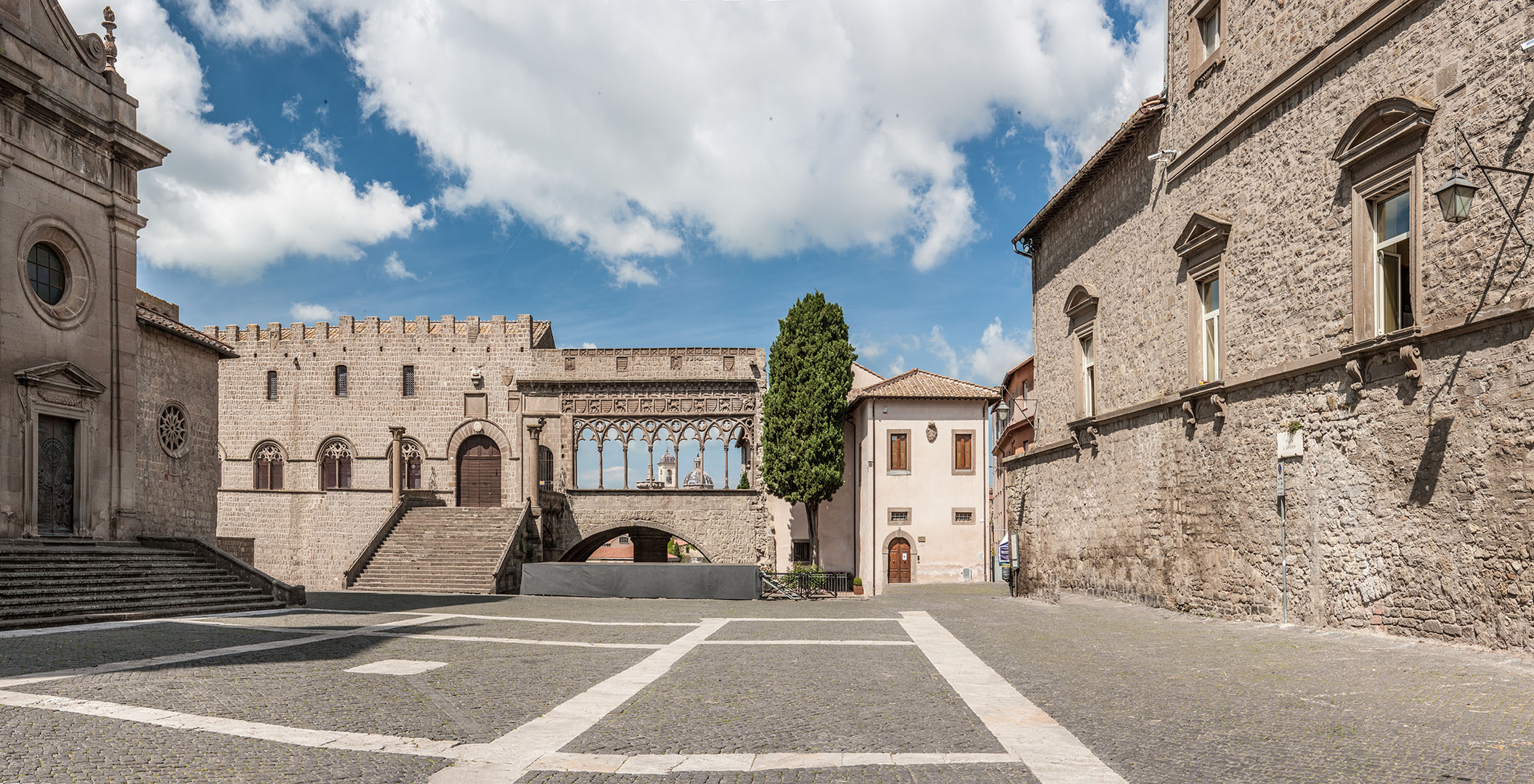
- Piazza di San Lorenzo and the loggia of the Papal Palace

- Flag Coat of arms

- Location within Italy Location within Lazio
- Coordinates: 42°25′N 12°06′E
- Country: Italy
- Region: Lazio
- Province: Viterbo (VT)
- Frazioni: Bagnaia, Fastello, Grotte Santo Stefano, La Quercia, Montanciano, Montecalvello, Monterazzano, Sant'Angelo, San Martino al Cimino, Vallebona

Government
  - Mayor: Chiara Frontini

Area
  - Total: 406.23 km^{2} (156.85 sq mi)
- Elevation: 326 m (1,070 ft)

Population (30 September 2017)
  - Total: 67,804
  - Density: 166.91/km^{2} (432.30/sq mi)
- Demonym: Viterbesi
- Time zone: UTC+1 (CET)
  - Summer (DST): UTC+2 (CEST)
- Postal code: 01100
- Dialing code: 0761
- Patron saint: Saint Rose of Viterbo and St. Lawrence the Martyr
- Saint day: 4 September; 10 August
- Website: Official website

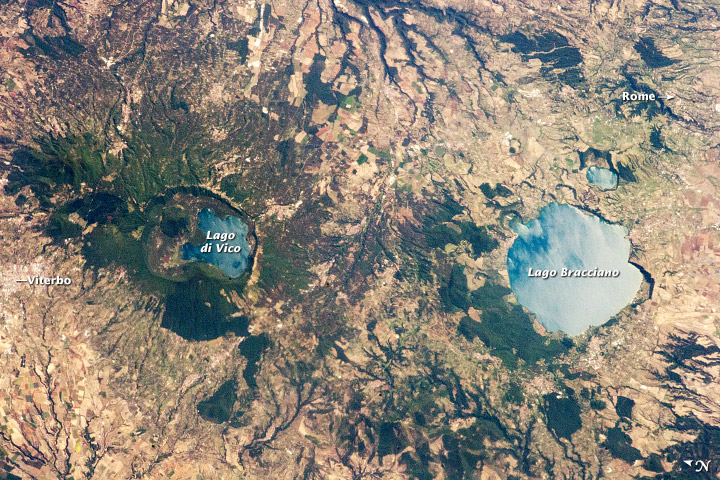
View from space of Viterbo and Rome

Viterbo (Italian: [viˈtɛrbo]; Viterbese: Veterbe; Medieval Latin: Viterbium) is a city and comune (municipality) in the Lazio region of Italy, the capital of the province of Viterbo.

It conquered and absorbed the neighboring town of Ferento (see Ferentium) in its early history. It is approximately 80 kilometres (50 miles) north of the Autostrada A90 on the Via Cassia, and it is surrounded by the Monti Cimini and Monti Volsini. The historic center is surrounded by the medieval walls of Viterbo, which are still mainly intact, built during the 11th and 12th centuries. Entrance to the walled center of the city is through ancient gates.

Apart from agriculture, Viterbo's main resources are pottery, peperino stone, and wood. The town is home to the Italian gold reserves, an important Academy of Fine Arts, the University of Tuscia, and the Italian Army's Aviation Command headquarters and training centre. It is located in a wide thermal area, attracting many tourists from all over central Italy.

== History ==
The first report of the new city dates to the eighth century AD, when it is identified as Castrum Viterbii. It was fortified in 773 by the Lombard King Desiderius in his vain attempt to conquer Rome. When the popes switched to the Frankish support, Viterbo became part of the Papal States. Still, this status was to be highly contested by the emperors in the following centuries, until 1095 when it was known as a free comune (municipality).

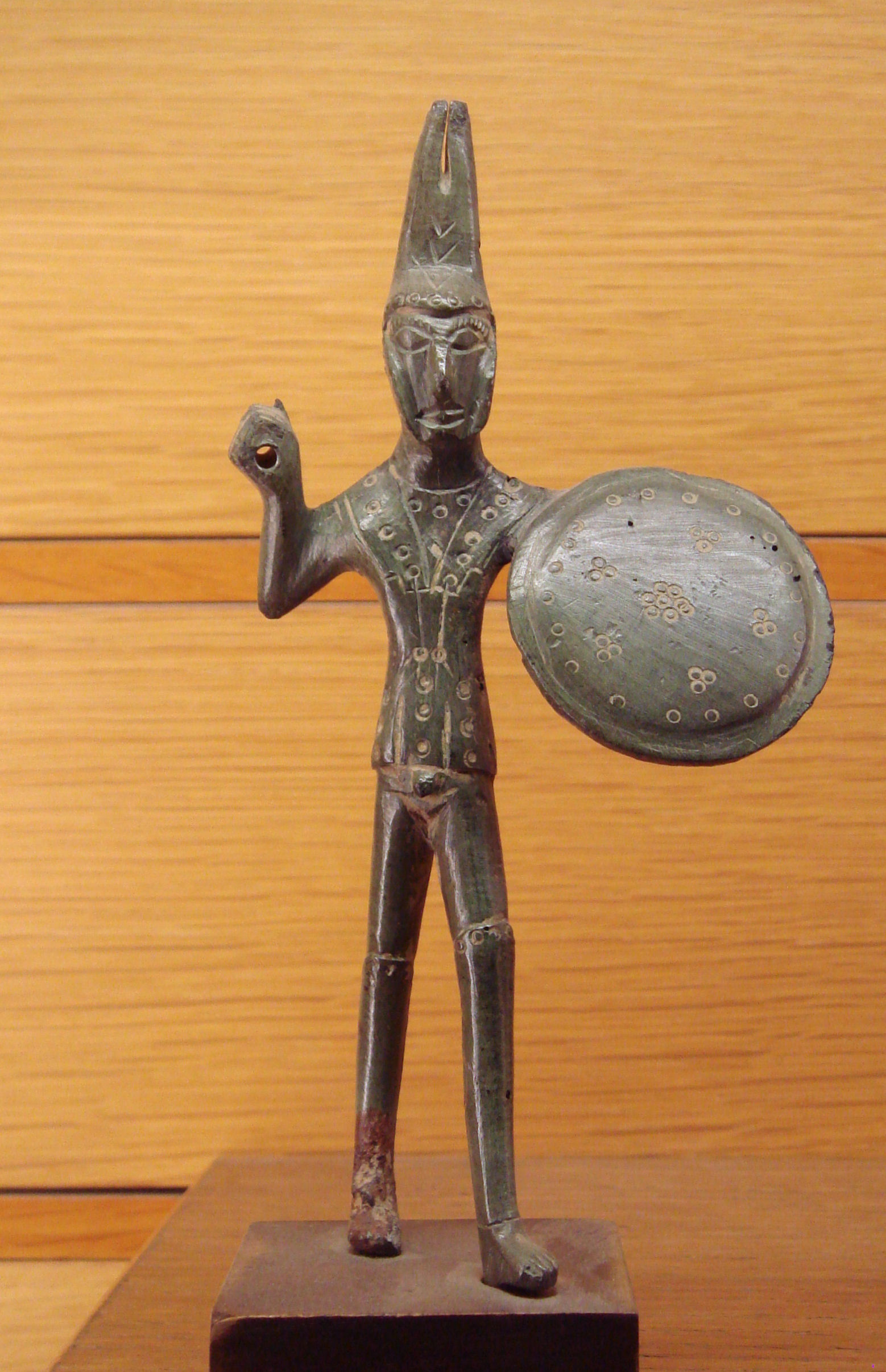
Etruscan warrior, found near Viterbo, dated circa 500 BC

In a period in which the popes had difficulties asserting their authority over Rome, Viterbo became their favourite residence, beginning with Pope Eugene III (1145–1146) who was besieged in vain in the city walls. In 1164, Frederick Barbarossa made Viterbo the seat of his antipope Paschal III. Three years later, he called it a "city" and used its militias against Rome. In 1172, Viterbo started its expansion, destroying the old city of Ferento and conquering other lands. In this age it was a rich and prosperous comune, one of the most important of Central Italy, with a population of almost 60,000.

In 1207, Pope Innocent III held a council in the cathedral, but the city was later excommunicated as the favourite seat of the heretical Patarines and even defeated by the Romans. In 1210, however, Viterbo managed to defeat Emperor Otto IV and was again at war against Rome.

In the thirteenth century it was ruled alternately by the tyrants of the Gatti and Di Vico families. Frederick II drew Viterbo to the Ghibelline side in 1240, but when the citizens expelled his turbulent German troops in 1243 he returned and besieged the city, but in vain. From that point Viterbo was always a loyal Guelph city. Between 1257 and 1261 it was the seat of Pope Alexander IV, who also died there. His successor Urban IV was elected in Viterbo.

In 1266–1268, Clement IV chose Viterbo as the base of his ruthless fight against the Hohenstaufen. Here, from the loggia of the Papal Palace, he excommunicated the army of Conradin of Swabia which was passing on the Via Cassia, with the prophetical motto of the "lamb who is going to the sacrifice". Other popes elected in Viterbo were Gregory X (1271) and John XXI (1276) (who died in the papal palace when the ceiling of the recently built library collapsed on him while he slept), Nicholas III and the French Martin IV. The Viterbese, who did not agree with the election of a foreigner directed by the King of Naples, Charles I of Anjou, invaded the cathedral where the conclave was held, arresting two of the cardinals. They were subsequently excommunicated, and the popes avoided Viterbo for 86 years.

Without the popes, the city fell into the hands of the Di Vicos. In the fourteenth century, Giovanni di Vico had created a seignory extending to Civitavecchia, Tarquinia, Bolsena, Orvieto, Todi, Narni and Amelia. His dominion was crushed by Cardinal Gil de Albornoz in 1354, sent by the Avignonese popes to recover the Papal States, who built the castle. In 1375, the city gave its keys to Francesco Di Vico, son of the previous tyrant, but thirteen years later the people killed him and assigned the city first to Pope Urban VI, and then to Giovanni di Sciarra di Vico, Francesco's cousin. But Pope Boniface IX's troops drove him away in 1396 and established a firm papal suzerainty over the city. The last Di Vico to hold power in Viterbo was Giacomo, who was defeated in 1431.

Thenceforth Viterbo became a city of secondary importance, following the vicissitudes of the Papal States. In the 16th century it was the birthplace of Latino Latini. It became part of Italy in 1871.

In 1927 Viterbo was made a provincial capital.

During World War II Viterbo was occupied by the Wehrmacht after the Armistice of Cassibile and heavily bombed by the Allies, suffering over twenty raids between July 1943 and June 1944; this left a third of the city destroyed or badly damaged, and caused heavy damage to cultural heritage and 1,017 civilian deaths. On 20 March 2024, an unexploded MK IV Bomb was found in a construction site causing an evacuation of more than 30,000 people in a range of 1400m until the bomb could be disposed of.

== Geography ==
=== Climate ===
Viterbo experiences a hot-summer mediterranean climate (Köppen climate classification: Csa). The annual average temperature is 14.5 °C (58.1 °F), the hottest month in August is 24.4 °C (75.9 °F), and the coldest month is 6.4 °C (43.5 °F) in January. The annual precipitation is 869.93 millimetres (34.25 in), of which November is the wettest with 127.09 millimetres (5.00 in), while July is the driest with only 30.64 millimetres (1.21 in).

Climate data for Viterbo, elevation: 300 m or 980 ft, 1991–2020 normals, extremes 1955–present
Month	Jan	Feb	Mar	Apr	May	Jun	Jul	Aug	Sep	Oct	Nov	Dec	Year
Record high °C (°F)	19.3 (66.7)	22.3 (72.1)	26.5 (79.7)	27.9 (82.2)	34.3 (93.7)	40.3 (104.5)	40.1 (104.2)	40.1 (104.2)	36.8 (98.2)	29.7 (85.5)	25.3 (77.5)	19.9 (67.8)	40.3 (104.5)
Mean daily maximum °C (°F)	10.6 (51.1)	11.9 (53.4)	14.7 (58.5)	17.9 (64.2)	22.4 (72.3)	27.4 (81.3)	31.2 (88.2)	31.3 (88.3)	26.0 (78.8)	20.7 (69.3)	15.0 (59.0)	11.2 (52.2)	20.0 (68.0)
Daily mean °C (°F)	6.4 (43.5)	7.1 (44.8)	9.4 (48.9)	12.3 (54.1)	16.3 (61.3)	20.8 (69.4)	24.0 (75.2)	24.4 (75.9)	20.1 (68.2)	15.6 (60.1)	10.7 (51.3)	7.1 (44.8)	14.5 (58.1)
Mean daily minimum °C (°F)	2.2 (36.0)	2.2 (36.0)	4.0 (39.2)	6.7 (44.1)	10.2 (50.4)	14.2 (57.6)	16.9 (62.4)	17.5 (63.5)	14.3 (57.7)	10.5 (50.9)	6.3 (43.3)	3.1 (37.6)	9.0 (48.2)
Record low °C (°F)	−12.7 (9.1)	−10.2 (13.6)	−9.2 (15.4)	−6.2 (20.8)	−2.2 (28.0)	4.2 (39.6)	6.4 (43.5)	8.4 (47.1)	3.1 (37.6)	−1.1 (30.0)	−11.2 (11.8)	−11.8 (10.8)	−12.7 (9.1)
Average precipitation mm (inches)	53.1 (2.09)	88.6 (3.49)	60.0 (2.36)	65.4 (2.57)	68.0 (2.68)	46.2 (1.82)	30.6 (1.20)	42.3 (1.67)	114.7 (4.52)	89.7 (3.53)	127.1 (5.00)	84.2 (3.31)	869.9 (34.25)
Average precipitation days (≥ 1.0 mm)	6.5	6.4	6.5	7.5	6.9	4.3	2.7	2.9	5.9	7.4	9.2	8.0	74.1
Average relative humidity (%)	74.5	70.6	69.6	70.1	69.2	66.1	62.5	62.8	67.8	73.3	77.2	76.1	70.0
Average dew point °C (°F)	1.0 (33.8)	0.8 (33.4)	2.8 (37.0)	5.4 (41.7)	9.5 (49.1)	12.3 (54.1)	14.0 (57.2)	14.6 (58.3)	12.2 (54.0)	9.7 (49.5)	5.5 (41.9)	2.3 (36.1)	7.5 (45.5)
Mean monthly sunshine hours	156.6	174.4	205.2	219.0	278.4	299.7	338.2	317.1	239.4	191.9	150.0	145.7	2,715.6
Source 1: Istituto Superiore per la Protezione e la Ricerca Ambientale (temperature)
Source 2: NOAA (dew point 1981–2010) Source 3: Temperature estreme in Toscana (extremes)

== Demographics ==
Historical population

Year	Pop.	±%
1861	-	—
1871	27,232	—
1881	26,833	−1.5%
1901	28,660	+6.8%
1911	30,801	+7.5%
1921	33,347	+8.3%
1931	35,969	+7.9%
1936	37,130	+3.2%

Year	Pop.	±%
1951	44,132	+18.9%
1961	50,047	+13.4%
1971	54,461	+8.8%
1981	57,632	+5.8%
1991	58,380	+1.3%
2001	59,308	+1.6%
2011	63,209	+6.6%
2021	65,931	+4.3%

Source: ISTAT

== Sights ==
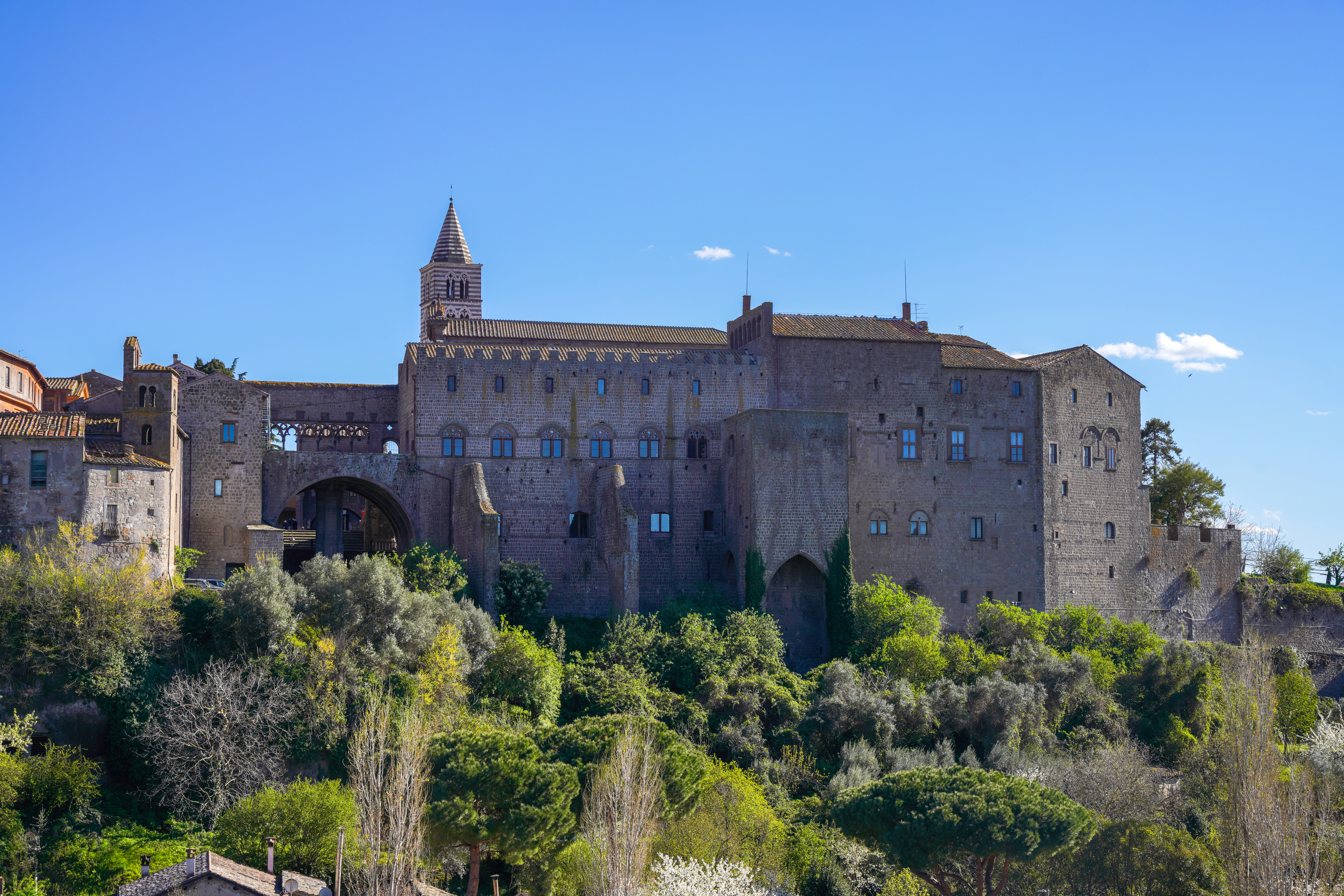
The Palace of the Popes – In the background the bell-tower of the cathedral

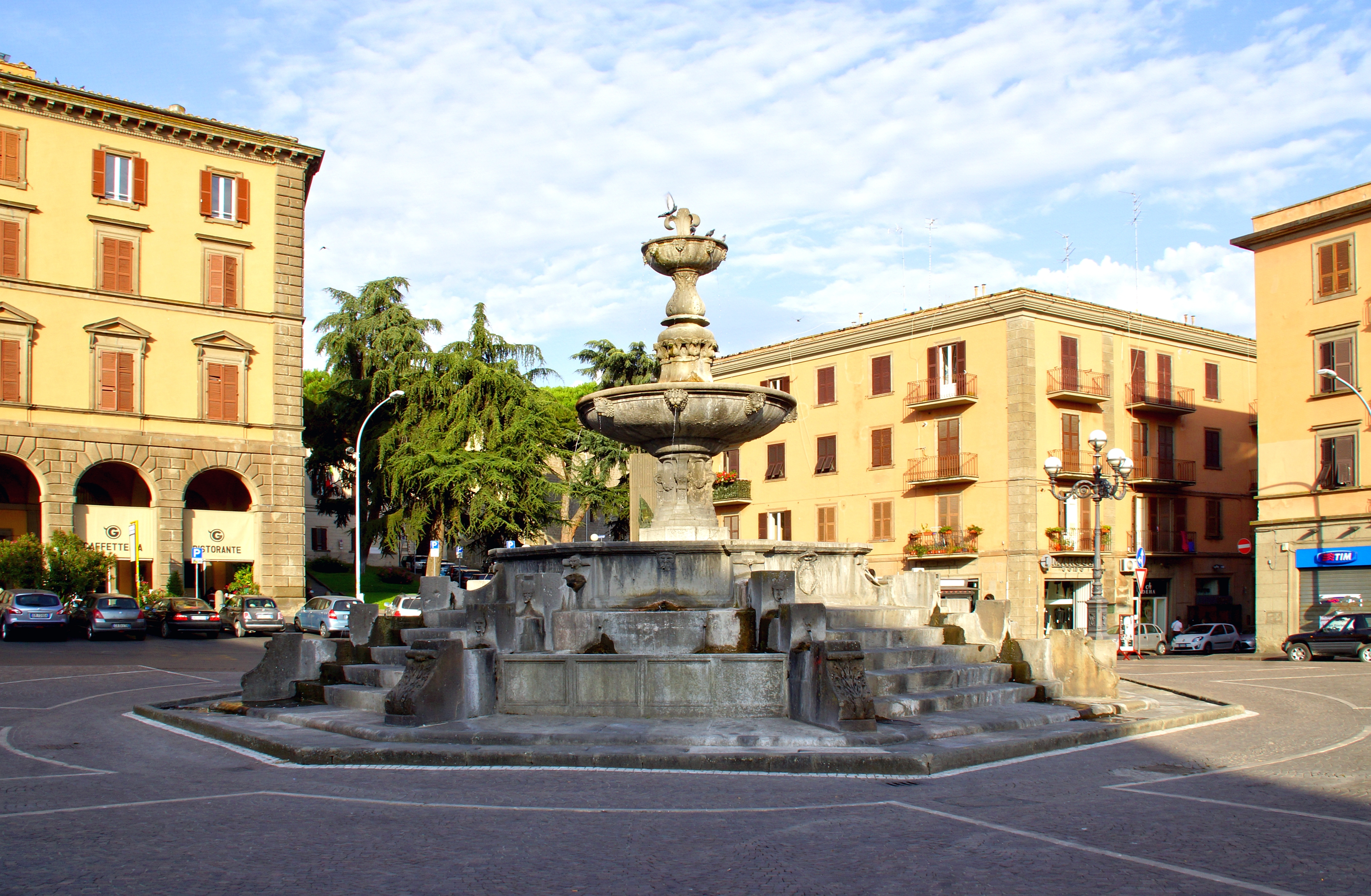
Fontana di Piazza della Rocca (12th–16th-century) in the center of Old Town Viterbo

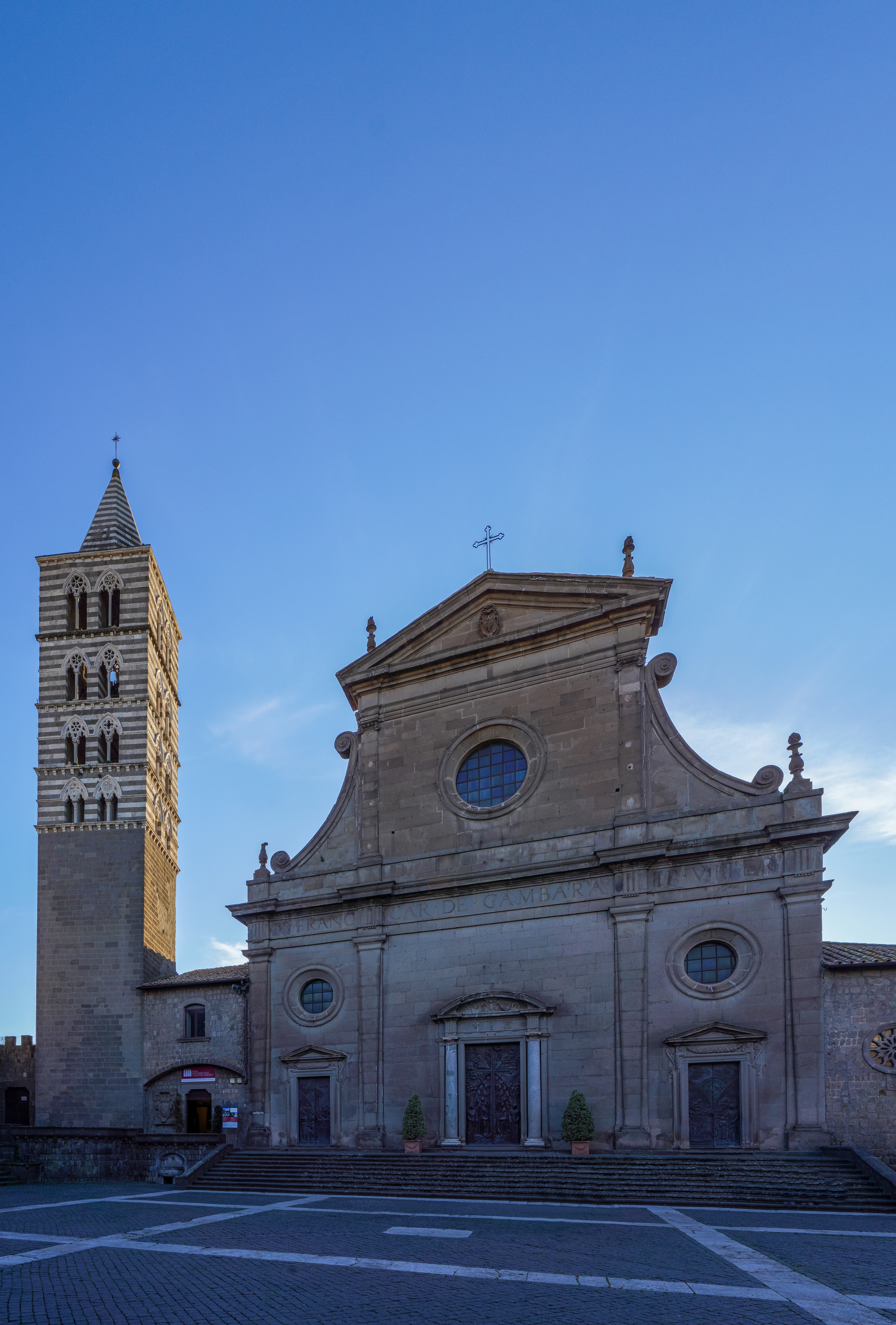
St. Lawrence Cathedral and bell-tower

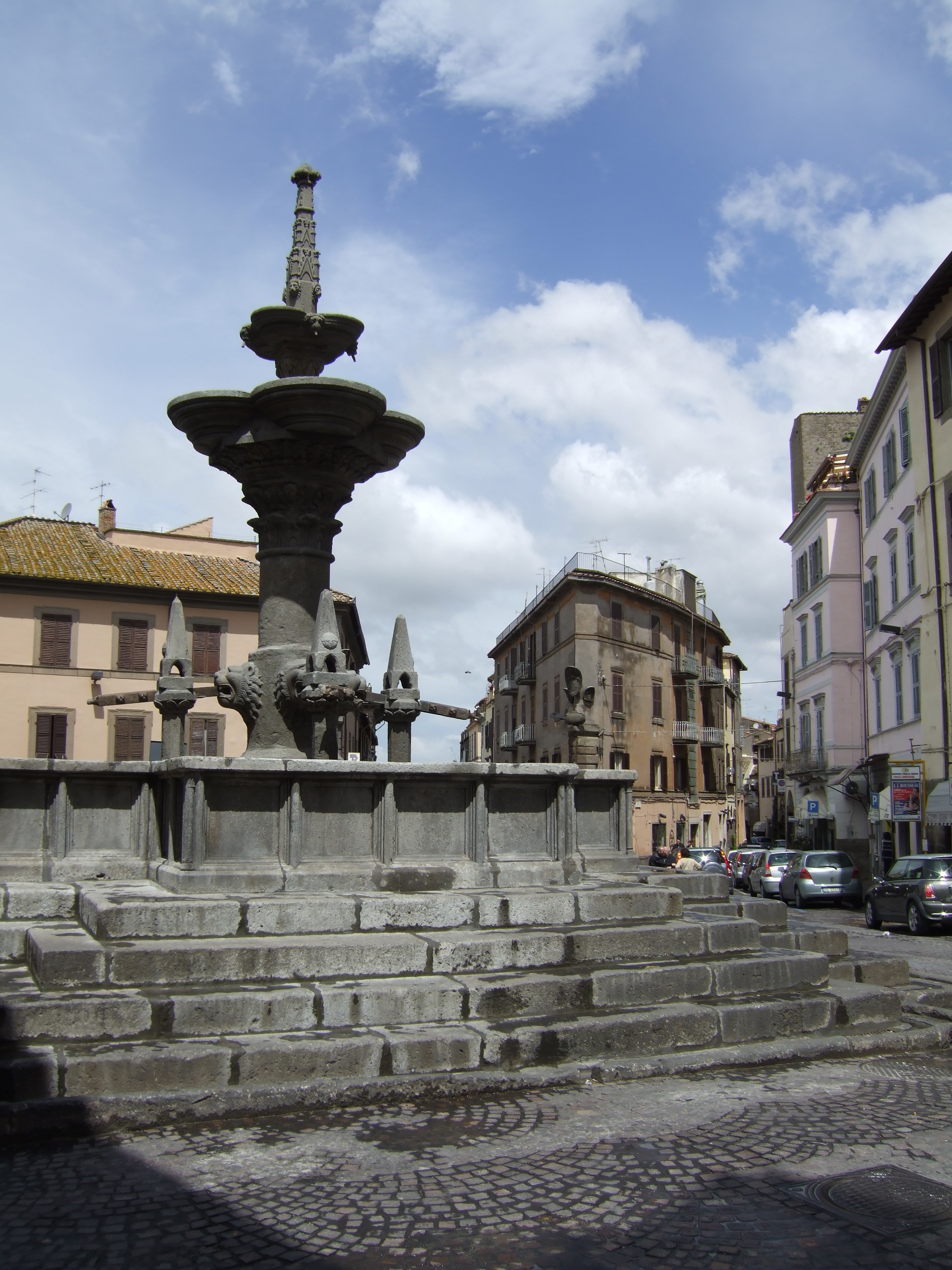
The Fontana Grande ("Grand Fountain") in the eponymous square

Viterbo's historic center is one of the best preserved medieval towns of central Italy. Many of the older buildings (particularly churches) are built on top of ancient ruins, recognizable by their large stones, 50 centimeters to a side. Viterbo is unique in Italy for its concentration of 'profferli', external staircases that were a frequent feature of medieval houses. The San Pellegrino quarter has an abundance of them, reflecting an architectural style that is unique to the town and the nearby region.

- Palazzo dei Papi or Papal Palace: main attraction of Viterbo, the palace hosted the papacy for about two decades in the 13th century, and served as a country residence or refuge in time of trouble in Rome. The columns of the palace are spolia from a Roman temple.
- Cathedral of San Lorenzo: Cathedral or duomo was originally erected as episcopal see of the exempt bishopric of Viterbo in Romanesque style by Lombard architects at the site of an ancient Roman temple of Hercules. It was rebuilt from the sixteenth century on, and heavily damaged in 1944 by Allied bombs. The Gothic belfry was built in the first half of the 14th century, and shows influence of Sienese architects. The church houses the sarcophagus of Pope John XXI and a picture Christ Blessing (1472) by Girolamo da Cremona.
- Palazzo Comunale (town hall; begun 1460), Palazzo del Podestà (magistrate's residence; 1264) and Palazzo della Prefettura (police HQ; rebuilt 1771): three civic buildings around the central square, Piazza del Plebiscito. The Palazzo Comunale houses a series of 17th century and Baroque frescoes by Tarquinio Ligustri, Bartolomeo Cavarozzi and Ludovico Nucci.
- Sant'Andrea Apostolo: a Romanesque-style, Roman Catholic church
- Santa Maria della Peste: a small 16th-century temple-church (tempietto)
- Santa Maria della Salute: a small Gothic church with a highly decorated portal
- Palazzo Farnese: 14th–15th-century palace was the childhood home of Alessandro Farnese, the future Pope Paul III, and his beautiful sister, Giulia Farnese.
- Palazzo Gatti: 13th-century Gothic architecture palace.
- Palazzo Mazzatosta: 13th-century aristocratic palace.
- Rocca (castle)
- Santa Maria Nuova (11th-century), San Sisto (second half of 9th-century), and San Giovanni in Zoccoli (11th-century): three Romanesque churches.
- Palazzo degli Alessandri: a typical medieval patrician house in central Viterbo
- Fontana di Piano Scarano: medieval fountain inside Viterbo city walls
- Fontana di Piazza della Rocca: public fountain in the center of the Old Town, construction 12th–16th century
- Fontana Grande: public fountain, construction began in 1206.
- San Francesco: gothic church built over a pre-existing Lombard fortress. It has a single nave with a Latin cross plan. It houses the sepulchre of Pope Adrian V, who died in Viterbo in 1276, considered the first monument by Arnolfo di Cambio.
- Sanctuary of Santa Rosa: church is a sober 19th-century reconstruction, where every year a new Macchina di Santa Rosa, or dedicatory tower is displayed.
- Museo Civico: City museum for arecheologic items from the pre-historic to Ancient Roman times, and a Pinacoteca (picture gallery) with works by Sebastiano del Piombo, Antoniazzo Romano, Salvator Rosa, Antiveduto Grammatica and others.
- Orto Botanico dell'Università della Tuscia: botanical garden operated by the university.

=== Baths of Viterbo ===
In the valley of the Arcione River just to the west of Viterbo are a number of springs celebrated for the healing qualities of their waters, and in use since Etruscan and Roman days. In fact, the imposing ruins of a great Roman bath are still to be seen and were drawn in plan and perspective by Renaissance artists including Giuliano da Sangallo, Michelangelo, and Vasari. One of the most famous were the thermal springs known as the "Bullicame", or bubbling place, whose reputation had even reached the ears of the exiled poet Dante Alighieri. Canto 14 (lines 79–81) of Dante's Inferno describes how:

In silence we had reached a place where flowed
a slender watercourse out of the wood—a stream
whose redness makes me shudder still.
As from the Bullicame pours a brook whose
waters are then shared by prostitutes, so did this
stream run down across the sand.

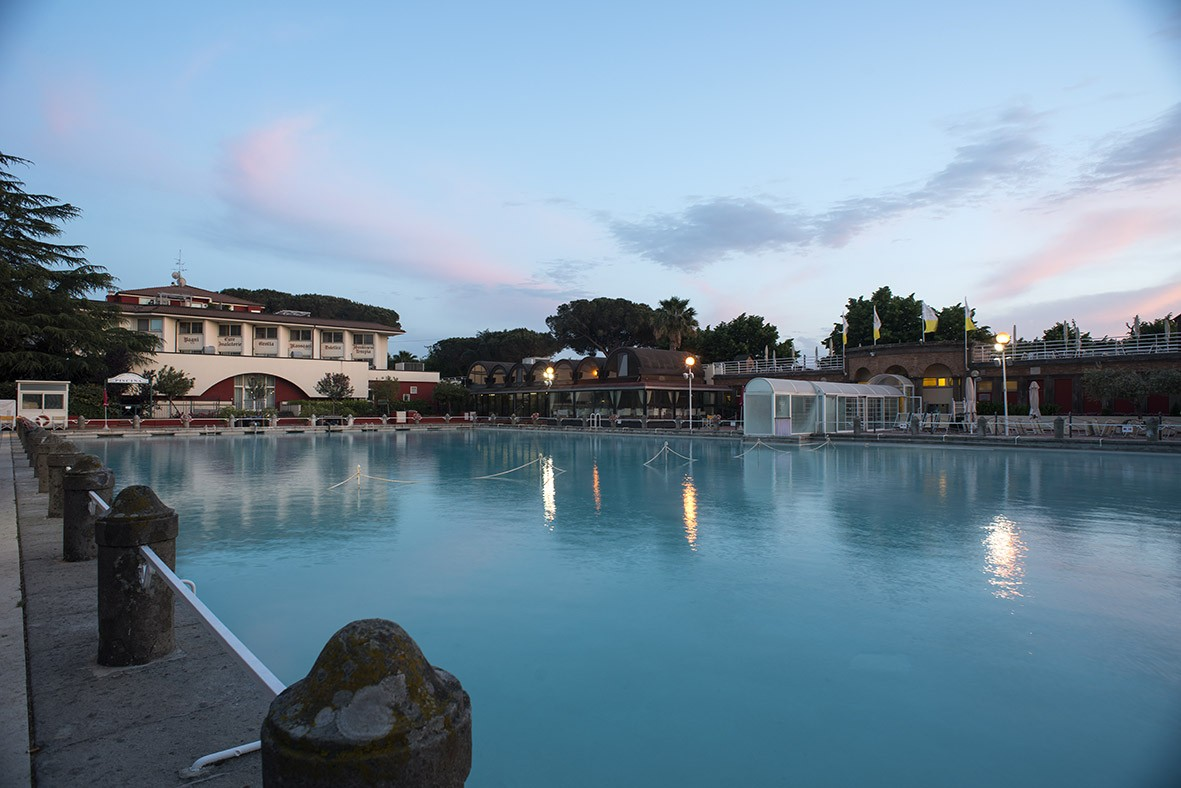
Bagno del Papa in Viterbo

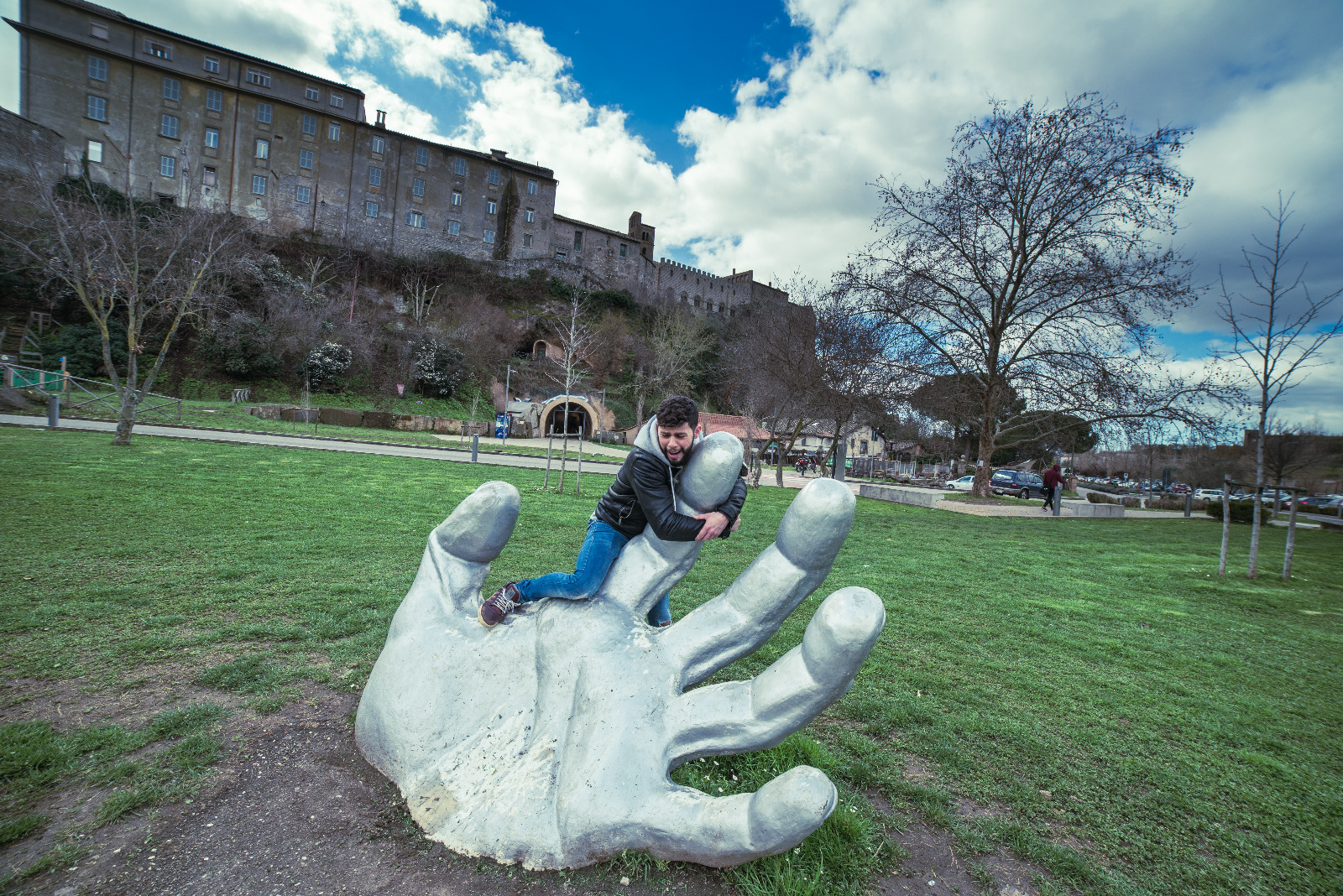
"The Awakening" by Seward Johnson in Viterbo

Not far from the Bullicame, whose waters were apparently always taken in the open, is the Terme dei Papi ("Bath of the Popes"). Almost totally concealed within the structure of a modern luxury spa hotel are the remains of a Renaissance bath palace that attracted the attention of two popes. Actually, the origins of this bathing establishment date to the Middle Ages when it was known as the Bagno della Crociata (named either after a Crusader who supposedly discovered the spring or from a corruption of the Italian word for crutch). Early 15th-century documents describe a bath building that covered three distinct thermal springs all under one roof.

This bath house was transformed circa 1454 by the Pope Nicholas V, who commissioned a bath palace (according to Nicholas's biographer, Giannozzo Manetti) "with such magnificence and with such expense that it was not only deemed suitable for a stay and salutary for the sick but seemed an edifice destined to have rooms fit for princes and for living regally". A more precise description of Pope Nicholas' palace was described by the Viterbese chronicler Niccola della Tuccia in the 1470s, who stated the new Bagno del Papa as a battlemented building, resembling a fortress, about 30 x 20 m in size with high towers at the corners of its southern façade. Located outside Viterbo, the spa would have been an easy target for assaults had the building not assumed a militant character, which also affirmed papal authority. Aside from the regal apartments described by Manedtti there were vaulted chambers at the lowest level to accommodate the patrons of the several thermal springs.

Manetti and Vasari both named the Florentine architect and sculptor Bernardo Rossellino as the architect of the project in Viterbo. There is, however, no documentation or architectural evidence to connect Rossellino directly with the construction of the Bagno del Papa. To the contrary, Vatican payment records from 1454, preserved in the state archives in Rome, identify a stonemason from Lombardy, named Stefano di Beltrame, as the builder who "had done or was doing in the house ordered by the pope at the bagni della Grotta and Crociata of Viterbo."

Construction at the Bagno del Papa was continued on through the reigns of several popes after Nicholas V. The Vatican accounts mention of payments "for building done at the bath palace of Viterbo" during the reigns of Calixtus III, Paul II, and Sixtus IV. There also is evidence Pope Pius II was responsible for the addition of a western wing to the building.

Travelers' descriptions, etched views, and local guidebooks chronicle the fate of the Renaissance Bagno del Papa over the years and through several rebuildings resulting in a general assumption that most of the original 15th-century structure had vanished. A guide to Viterbo from 1911 does note that some remnants were still to be detected in basement piers and vaults. In operation as a thermal hospital in 1927, the building was blown up by retreating German forces in 1944.

Despite all the travails, much of the original Bagno del Papa built by Popes Nicholas V and Pius II survives, including the corner towers and the vaulted chambers where Renaissance patrons once bathed.

== Military ==
Viterbo became a centre of military aviation due to its proximity to Rome, especially after the opening of the Air Force base (now the Rome Viterbo Airport but still used for military purposes) during the 1930s. The Army Aviation Command headquarters and training school (Italian: Scuola marescialli dell'Aeronautica Militare) are both located there.

The Army's NCO training establishment (Italian: Scuola sottufficiali dell'Esercito Italiano) is also located in the city.

== Notable people ==
Born in Viterbo

- Leonardo Bonucci (born 1987), footballer
- Angelo Peruzzi, footballer
- Bartolomeo Cavarozzi (1587–1625), painter
- Giacomo Cordelli (active c. 1600–1620), painter
- Domenico Corvi (1721–1803), Neoclassicist painter
- Saint Crispin of Viterbo (né Pietro Fioretti), member of the Friars Minor Capuchin
- David D'Antoni (born 1979), footballer
- Giles of Viterbo (1472–1532), Augustinian friar, bishop and cardinal
- Cristiano Lombardi (born 1995), footballer
- Elio Marchetti (born 1974), racing driver
- Giuseppe Ottaviani (born 1978), trance musician
- Gabrielle Réval (1869-1938), novelist, essayist
- Saint Rose of Viterbo (1233–1251), patron saint of the city
- Gianni Scipione Rossi (born 1953), journalist

Lived in Viterbo

- Antonio del Massaro (also known as "Antonio da Viterbo"), painter
- Reginald Pole, cardinal, archbishop of Canterbury, church reformer
- Kathleen Napoli McKenna, Irish Republican activist and journalist
- Licia Fertz, influencer and activist

Died in Viterbo

- Saint Hyacintha Mariscotti (1585–1640), nun

== Religion ==
=== Patron saints ===
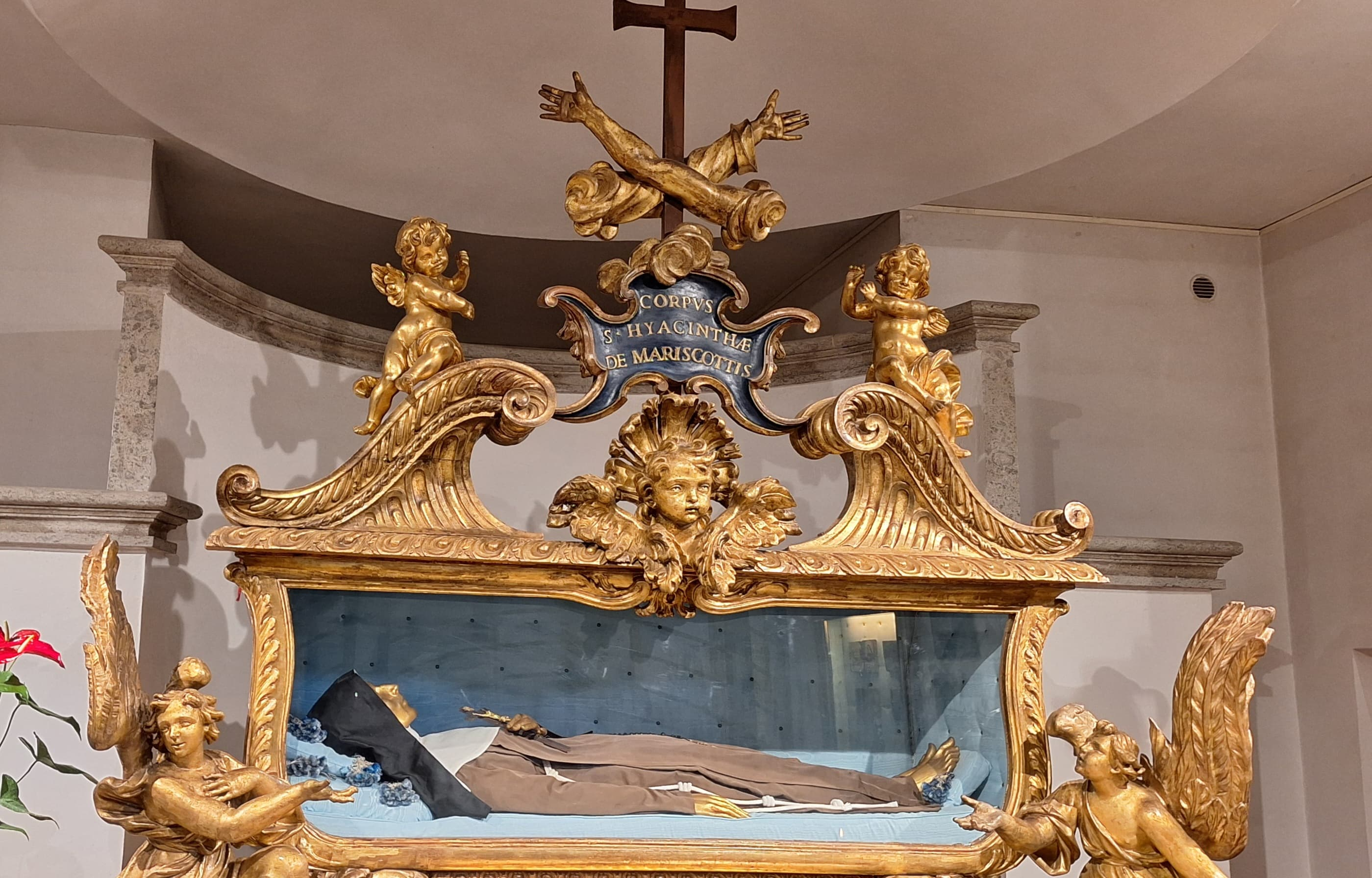
Tomb with the body of Saint Hyacintha Mariscotti exposed for public veneration in Viterbo, Italy

Saint Rose is the patron saint of Viterbo. The legend of Santa Rosa is that she helped to eradicate those few who supported the emperors instead of the popes, around 1250. Saint Lawrence is the male patron saint. Saint Hyacintha Mariscotti is the co-patroness of the city.

=== Macchina di Santa Rosa ===
The transport of the Macchina di Santa Rosa takes place every year, on 3 September, at 9 o'clock in the evening. The Macchina is an artistic illuminated bell-tower with an imposing height of 30 m. It weighs between 3.5 and 5 tonnes and is made of iron, wood and papier-mâché. At the top of the tower, the statue of the patron saint is enthusiastically acclaimed by the people in the streets of the town centre, where lights are turned off for the occasion. One hundred Viterbesi men (known as the Facchini) carry the Macchina from Porta Romana through each of the major streets of Viterbo to seven churches to be blessed, concluding with a strenuous ascension up to the Piazza di Santa Rosa, its final resting place. Each Macchina's lifespan differs, but contests for a new design are held every few years.

== Transportation ==
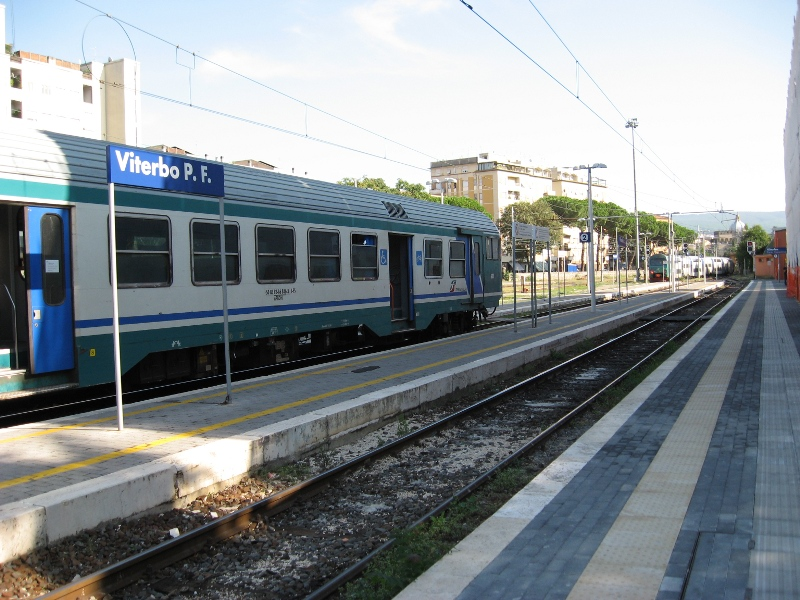
Porta Fiorentina is one of three train stations serving Viterbo.

The Rome Viterbo Airport was opened in 1936 as part of Viterbo Air Force Base, located 3 kilometres (2 miles) from the town. On 26 November 2007, Italian transport minister Alessandro Bianchi announced that Viterbo had been chosen as the site of the next airport in Lazio to serve Rome. However, in 2013 those plans were abandoned. Viterbo is served by regional trains departing from Station Ostiense, Trastevere, S. Pietro and sometimes at Termini in Rome. Porta Romana is the station serving the old city center.

== Education ==
The city is home to the Tuscia University, established in 1979. It is also the city where students of School Year Abroad's Italy program study, their school housed in a 16th-century palazzo on Via Cavour.

== Twin towns – sister cities ==
Viterbo is twinned with:

- (New York (state)) Binghamton, New York, United States
- (New York (state)) Albany, New York, United States
- (São Paulo (state)) Santa Rosa de Viterbo, São Paulo, Brazil
- Gubbio, Perugia, Umbria, Italy
- Palmi, Reggio Calabria, Calabria, Italy
- Nola, Naples, Campania, Italy
- Sassari, Sassari, Sardinia, Italy
- Campobasso, Campobasso, Molise, Italy
- Springfield, Massachusetts, United States

== Sources ==
- Charles R. Mack, "The Bath Palace of Nicholas V at Viterbo", in An Architectural Progress in the Renaissance and the Baroque: Sojourns In and Out of Italy, Papers in Art History VIII, Pennsylvania State University, Vol. I, 1992, 45–63.
- Charles R. Mack, "The Renaissance Spa: Testing the Architectural Waters", Southeastern College Art Conference Review, XI, 3, 1988, 193–200.
- Valtieri, Simonetta, "Rinascimento a Viterbo: Bernardo Rossellino", Architettura, croniche e storia, XVII, 1972, 686–94.
