= San Francesco, Viterbo =

Parish church and minor basilica in Viterbo, Italy

Basilica of St Francis San Francesco alla Rocca
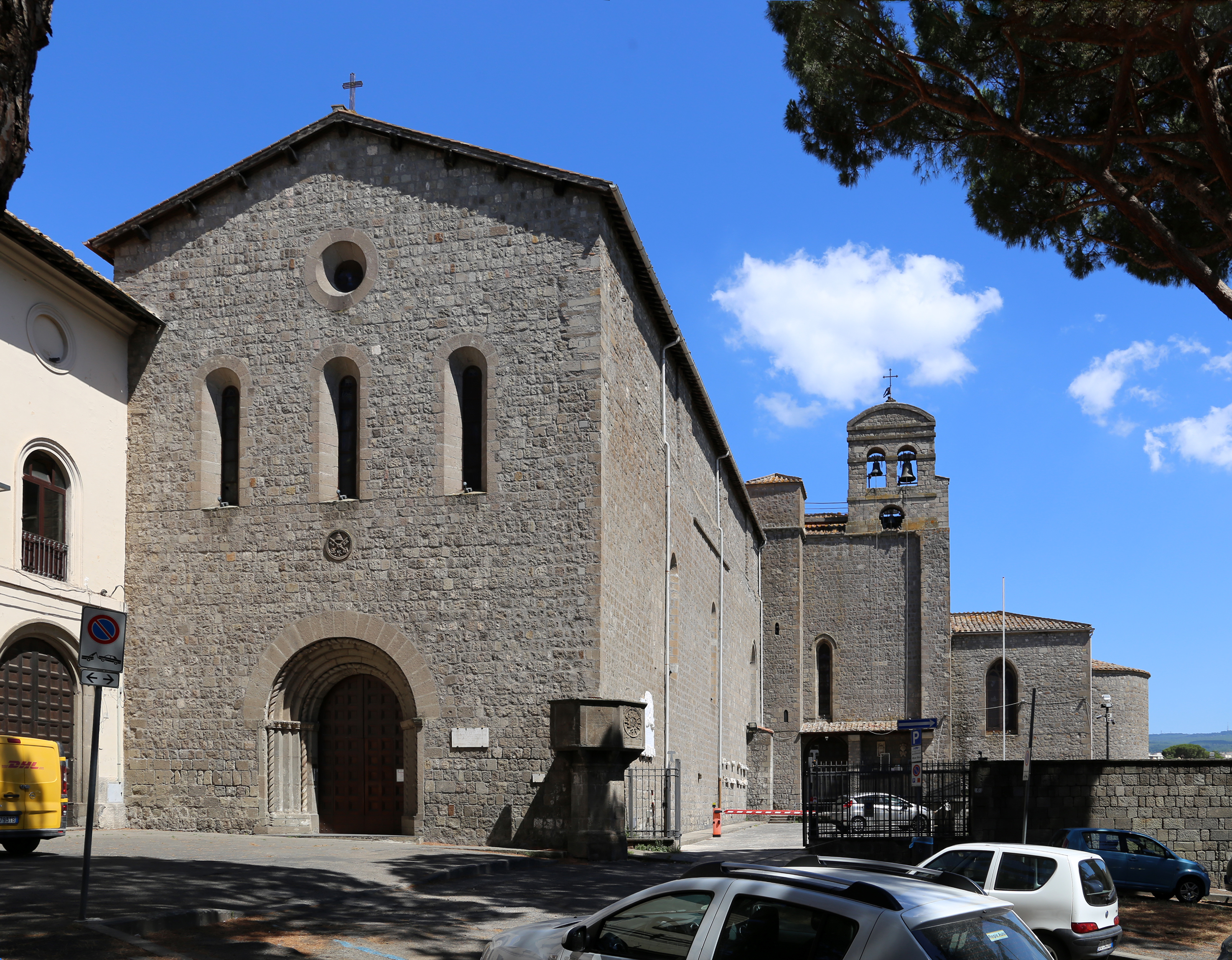
- Romanesque façade of San Francesco

Religion
- Affiliation: Roman Catholic
- Province: Diocese of Viterbo
- Ecclesiastical or organisational status: Parish church, minor basilica

Location
- Location: Viterbo, Lazio, Italy
- Interactive map of Basilica of St Francis; San Francesco alla Rocca
- Coordinates: 42°25′19″N 12°6′25″E

Architecture
- Type: Church
- Style: Romanesque
- Groundbreaking: 1237
- Completed: 13th century

Website
- www.sanfrancescoviterbo.it

The Basilica of St Francis (Italian: Basilica di San Francesco alla Rocca) is a parish church and minor basilica located on Piazza San Francesco #6 in Viterbo, region of Lazio, Italy. The museological management of the church is run by the Polo Museale del Lazio. The church is just northeast of the Piazza della Rocca Albornoz, just diagonally behind the Palazzo Grandori, at the northern edge (near Porta Fiorentina) of historic Viterbo.

== History ==
The church was built from 1237, on land donated by Pope Gregory IX to the Franciscan Order. A pre-existing Palazzo degli Alemanni, dating to 1208, was incorporated in the convent complex annexed to the church. Pope Urban IV celebrated the canonization of the English Bishop Richard of Chichester in 1262. The structure was restored in the 16th and 17th centuries, with the addition of Baroque elements which hid the original Romanesque ones. An inscription on the façade states that the church, partly destroyed by the Allied bombings of 17 January 1944, was rebuilt and reopened in 1953. These restorations led to the removal of the Baroque add-ons and the restoration of the original Romanesque appearance.

== Description ==
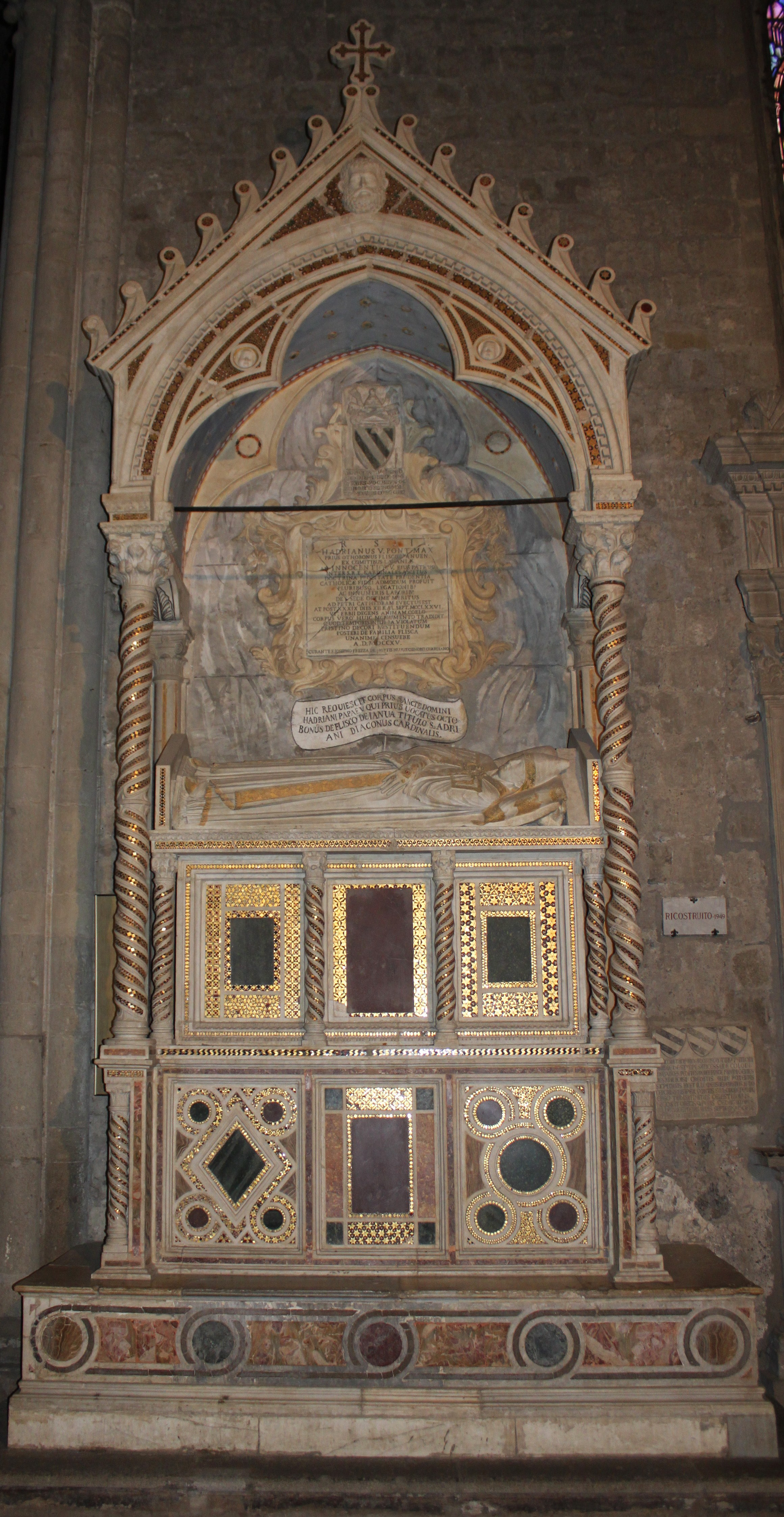
Funerary monument of Pope Adrian V

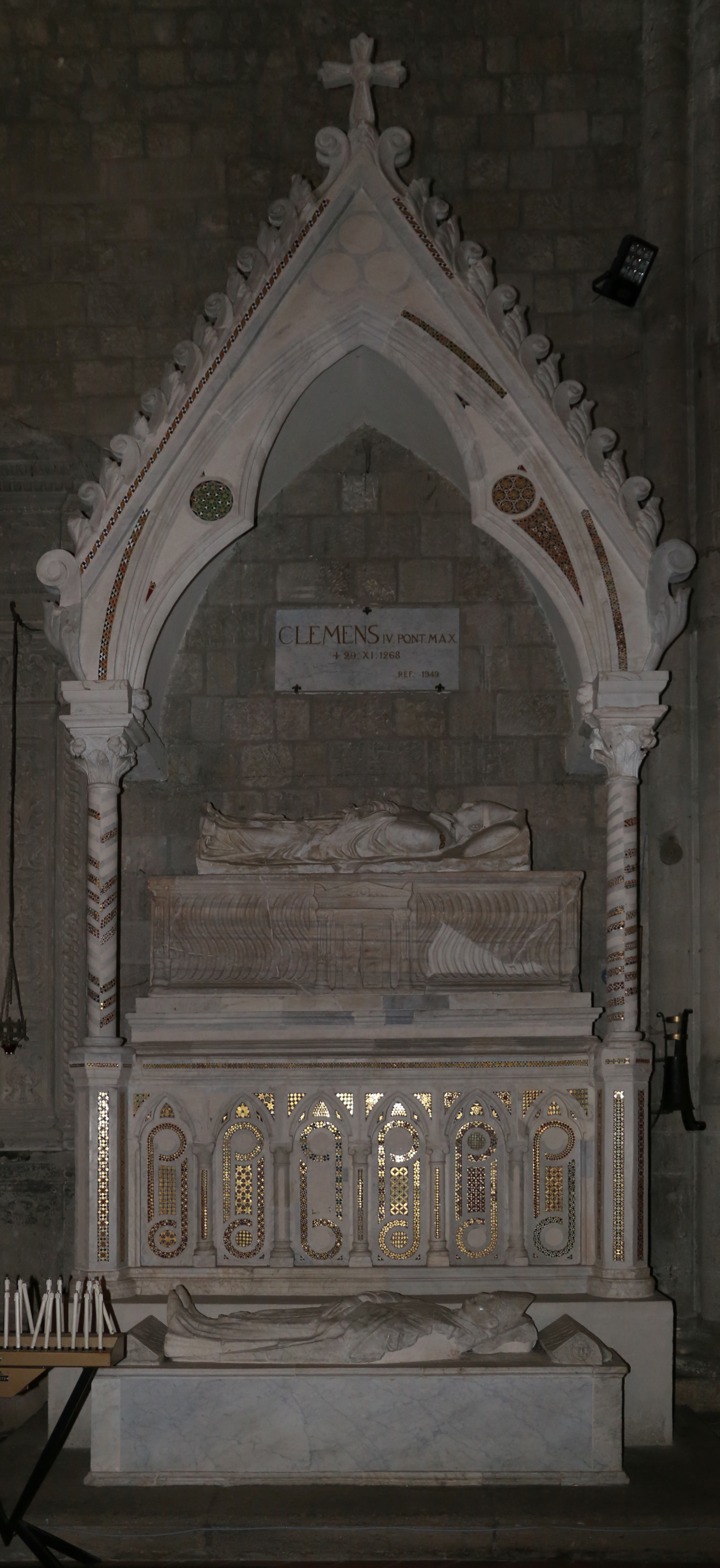
Funerary monument of Pope Clement IV

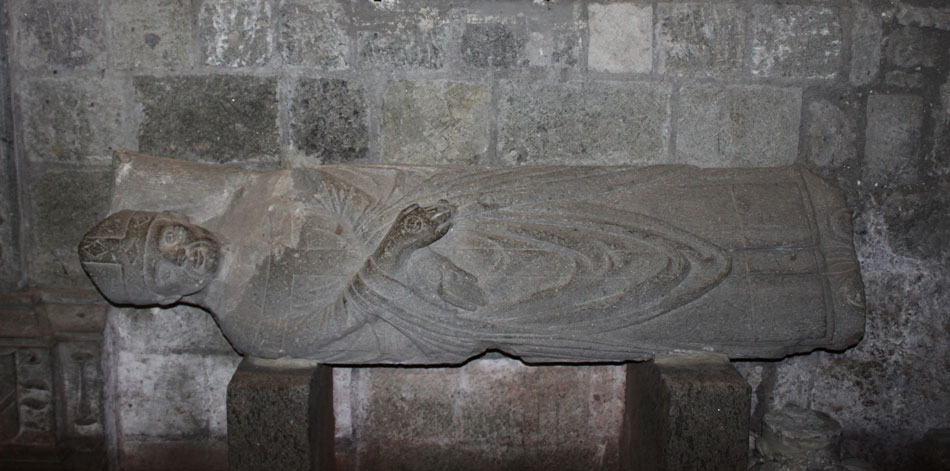
Statue of Vicedomino de Vicedominis.

The façade has a Romanesque portal with twisting columns. Above it are the insignia of Pope Pius XII, who elevated the church to the rank of minor basilica in 1949, and, above it, three single mullioned windows and an oculus. The original medieval façade features a portico and several frescoes. At the right corner is a hexagonal pulpit, erected in 1238 as a memorial of Bernardino of Siena's preaching in Viterbo. The church has a bell tower with a bell from 1259.

The convent housed in its history several saints, popes and emperors. It is now the seat of the military district of Viterbo.

The interior is on the Latin cross plan, with a square apse and trussed ceiling. The latter was covered in Baroque times by a fake barrel vault. Artworks which have survived the 1944 bombing include:

- Right wall:
  - Panel portraying Viterbo with Saints Antony of Padua and Rose of Viterbo (1572)
  - Pietà by Tommaso Masini
- Right transept:
  - Remains of the funerary monument of Pietro di Vico by Pietro Oderisi (1269)
  - Gothic funerary monument of pope Adrian V (died 1276), attributed to Arnolfo di Cambio, with a rich Cosmatesque decoration
- Left transept:
  - damaged remains of the funerary monument of Pope Clement IV (died 1268), executed by Pietro Oderisi in 1270
  - Funerary statue, in peperino stone, of the tomb of cardinal Vicedomino de Vicedominis
  - 16th century entrance of the sacristy, which formerly displayed the Pietà by Sebastiano del Piombo, now in the Civic Museum of Viterbo
  - Remains of the large funerary monument of cardinal Gerardo Landriani (died 1445)
- Right wall of the nave:
  - Remains of the funerary monument of Cardinal Fra Marco of Viterbo, general of the Order of Friars Minor (died 1369)
  - Baptismal font and a canvas of Madonna with Child and Saints by Monaldo Trofi.

The paintings of the ancient basilica were entirely frescoed, similarly to the mother Franciscan Basilica of Assisi. They were mostly executed by Antonio del Massaro. They were lost during the 18th century restoration and the 1944 bombing.
