= Palazzo dei Priori, Viterbo =

Civic palace in Lazio, Italy

Coordinates: 42.41695°N 12.10481°E

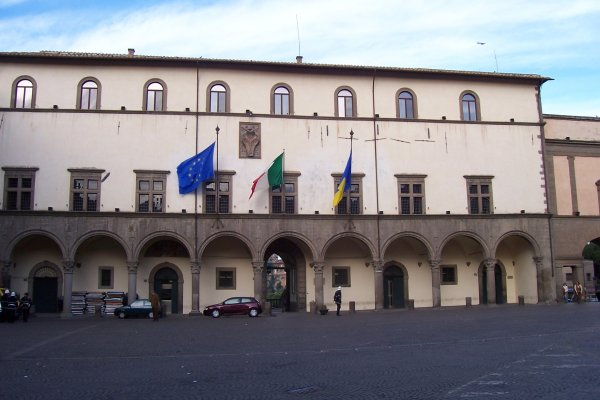
Palazzo dei Priori

The Palazzo dei Priori is a 13th-century civic palace located in Piazza del Plebiscito in central Viterbo, region of Lazio, Italy. Known in the past also as the Palazzo della Commune or Comunale, it now houses both municipal offices and the Museo dei Portici, which houses the famous altarpieces by Sebastiano del Piombo, depicting a Pietà and a Flagellation. The Palace is connected and accessible through an arch over Via Filippo Ascenzi to the former Palazzo del Governatore or Palazzo del Podesta, behind which rises a tall medieval clock tower. Its largest bell deriving from the church of Santa Maria della Verita. Across the piazza on the north end of the Palazzo dei Priori is the church of Sant'Angelo in Spatha, which has a marble replica of the Ancient Roman Sarcophagus of Bella Galiana on the facade. To the left of the palace, facing the piazza is the baroque Palazzo della Prefettura.

== History ==
This civic palace was initially built starting 1460 during the reign of Pope Pius II. The facade of the Palazzo dei Priori was completed during the reign of Pope Sixtus IV della Rovere (1471–1484) by Bernardo Rossellino. The coat of arms of the Della Rovere family is inserted into the middle of the facade. The main portico, constructed in 1632, opens to a paved patio overlooking the walls of the town. In the center of this patio is a fountain designed by Filippo Caparozzi. The dilapidated shield on the basin belonged to Girolamo Grimaldi, governor of Viterbo during 1625–1628. Surrounding the patio are a series of recumbent statues from the lids of Etruscan sarcophagi. At the north of the patio is an entrance to the ground floor of the Museo dei Portici, which is a branch of the Museo Civico Luigi Rossi Danielli.

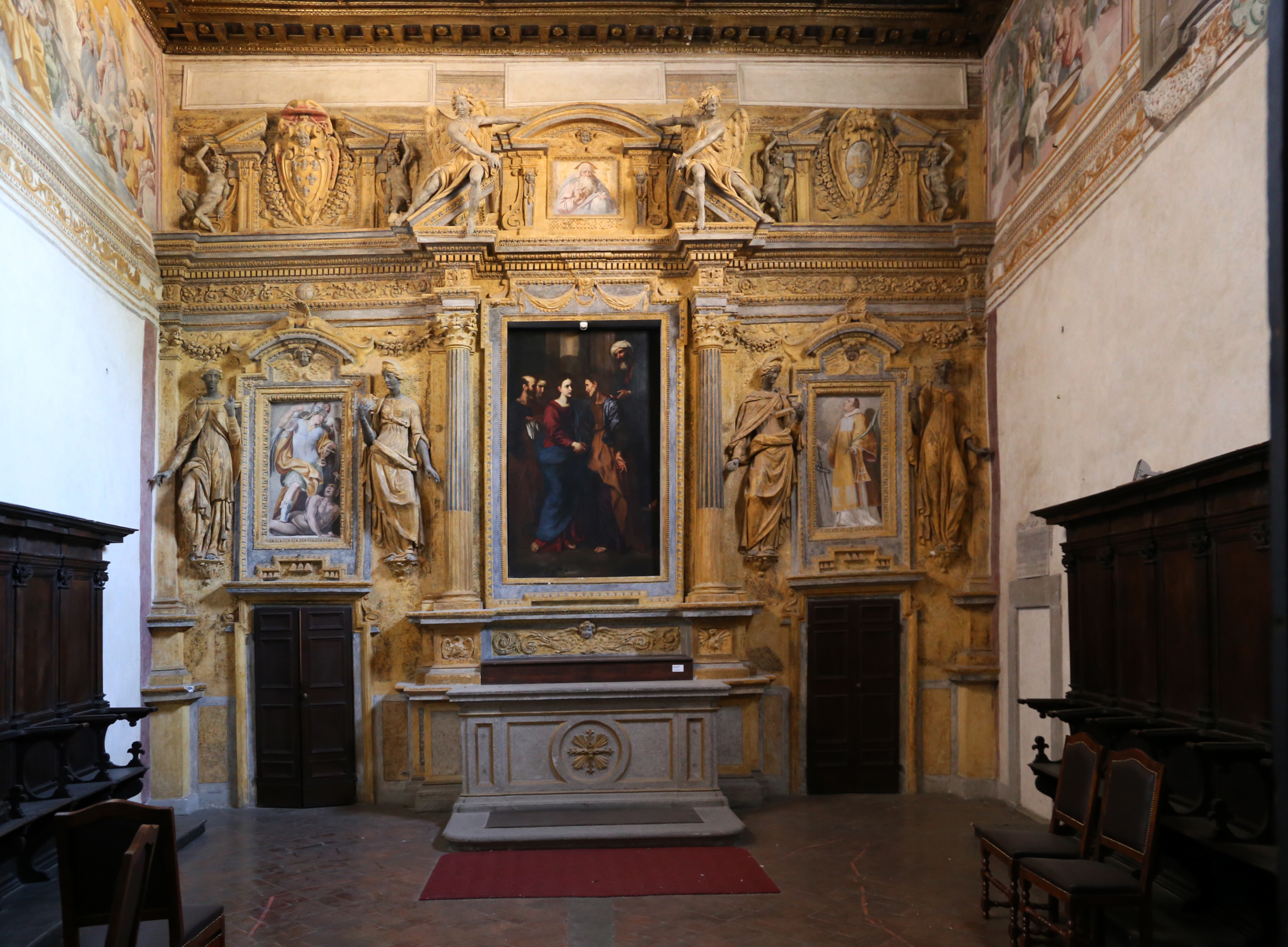
Capella Palatina and Visitation by Cavarozza

The piano nobile of the palazzo is richly frescoed. The chapel of the commune (also called Capella Palatina) was decorated by Filippo Caparozzi and Marzio Ganassino in the early 17th century. The main altar has a large canvas depicting a Visitation by the Caravaggisti painter Bartolomeo Cavarozza. The Hall of the Madonna in the palazzo has a Madonna della Quercia painted by Francesco d'Avanzarano.

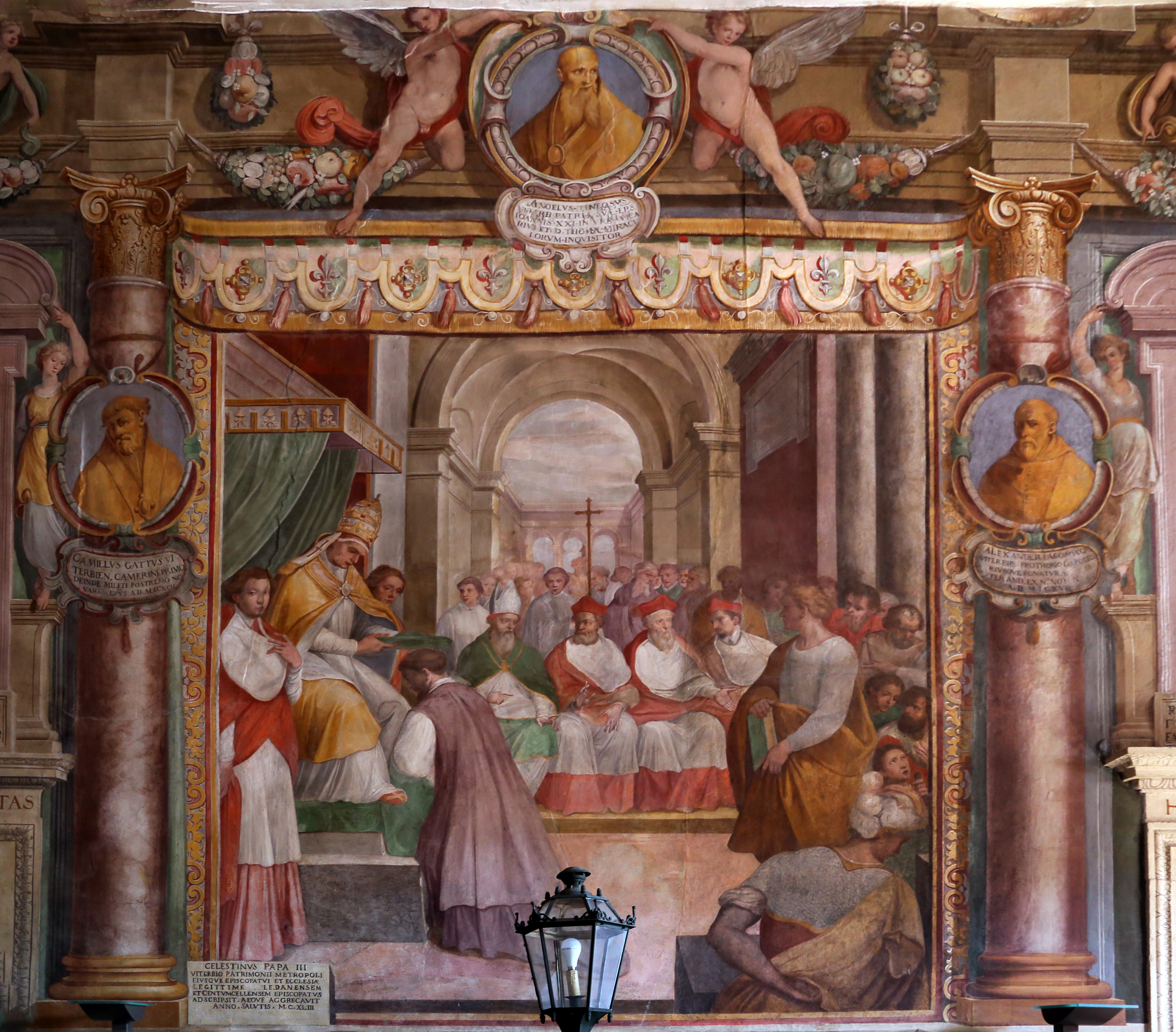
Celestine III consecrates the first Bishop of Viterbo by Croce in Sala Reggia

The main hall or Sala Regia, was decorated with frescoes by Tarquinio Ligustri, Luigi Nuzzi and Baldassare Croce. Many of the panels depict events in the mythology and history of Viterbo and were based on events claimed by Annius of Viterbo as interpreted by Domenico Bianchi. They include maps of the Duchy of Tuscia. Another depicts Pope Celestine III consecrating the first bishop of Viterbo. Another depicts Bernard di Cuccinaco, papal Vicar, in 1316 after defeating the rebellious cities that were part of Papal patrimony grants the city his gonfalone (banner). Another panel depicts Pope Paul III Farnese in 1546 consecrating the Order of the Giglio and basing the order in Viterbo. Above the entrance is a depiction of Cardinal Fazio Santoro. The Sala del Consiglio has monochrome frescoes of heroes and saints. The library retains portraits of the historian Francesco Orioli and the scholar Antonio Tagliaferri, who instituted in 1502 the academic society known as the Accademia degli Ardenti.
