= Tampia gens =

Ancient Roman family

The gens Tampia was a minor plebeian family at ancient Rome. Members of this gens are first mentioned in history during the time of Nero, but few achieved any distinction in the Roman state. The nomen Tampius is easily confused with that of Ampius. The most illustrious of the Tampii was Lucius Tampius Flavianus, who held the consulship twice during the latter half of the first century.

== Origin ==
The earliest Tampii known from inscriptions came from Praeneste, an ancient city of Latium, probably indicating that they were Latins; but at least three of this gens bore the cognomen Sabinus, typically indicating a tradition of Sabine descent, or some other association with Sabine manners or appearance.

== Praenomina ==
The main praenomina of the Tampia gens were Lucius and Gaius, the two most common names at all periods of Roman history. Several Tampii also bore other common praenomina, such as Marcus, Publius, and Quintus, while a few had more distinctive names, such as Decimus and Servius.

== Members ==
This list includes abbreviated praenomina. For an explanation of this practice, see filiation.

- Lucius Tampius, named in an inscription from Praeneste in Latium, dating to the latter half of the third century BC.
- Gaius Tampius D. f., named in an inscription from Praeneste, dating to the late third century BC.
- Marcus Tampius C. f., named in an inscription from Praeneste, dating to the late third century BC.
- Marcus Tampius M. f., named in an inscription from Praeneste, dating to the late third century BC.
- Tampia C. f., named in an inscription from Praeneste, dating to the second century BC.
- Gaius Tampius C. f. Ser. n. Tarenteinus, praetor at Praeneste, made an offering to Hercules, commemorated in an inscription dating to the latter half of the second century BC.
- Tampia L. f., made an offering to Jupiter at Patavium in Venetia and Histria, dating to the early first century BC.
- Lucius Tampius, named in a bronze inscription from Aquileia in Venetia and Histria, dating from the first half of the first century BC.
- Tampia L. l. Stratonice, buried in a family sepulchre at Rome, dating from the first century BC, and dedicated by Euhodus, a margaritarius, or dealer in pearls, in the Velabrum, perhaps Tampia's husband.
- Lucius Tampius L. l. Papa, a freedman buried at Rome, in a tomb dedicated by Tampia Prima, dating between 50 BC and AD 30.
- Tampia L. l. Prima, a freedwoman who dedicated a tomb for Lucius Tampius Papa, dating between 50 BC and AD 30.
- Lucius Tampius L. f. Peccio, dedicated a family sepulchre at Sena Gallica in Umbria for himself, his wife, Maxima Oppia, and Quintus Oppius, dating from the latter half of the first century BC, or the first half of the first century AD.
- Lucius Tampius Acutus, husband of the freedwoman Safinia Agathemeris, named in an inscription dating from the first half of the first century.
- Gaius Tampius Cliens, named in an inscription from Asculum in Picenum, dating between AD 16 and 50.
- Tampia Ɔ. l., a freedwoman buried in a first-century tomb at Canusium in Apulia, dedicated by the freedwoman Tampia Fa[...] for herself and her family.
- Lucius Tampius, one of the municipal duumvirs at Casilinum in Campania during the first century.
- Gaius Tampius C. l. Chaeria, a freedwoman buried at Canusium, in a first-century tomb dedicated by Tampia Hilara, with whom he had been freed.
- Gaius Tampius C. l. Eros, a freedman buried at Canusium, in a first-century tomb dedicated by his client, the freedwoman Tampia Hilara.
- Tampia D. l. Fa[...], a freedwoman and the wife of Sextus Aburius, dedicated a first-century family sepulchre at Canusium for herself, her son, also named Sextus Aburius, and another freedwoman named Tampia.
- Tampia C. l. Hilara, a freedwoman who dedicated a first-century tomb at Canusium for her patron, Gaius Tampius Eros, and her fellow freedman, Gaius Tampius Chaeria.
- Lucius Tampius L. l. Ingenuus, a freedman buried in a first-century tomb at Rome, along with his wife, Crassicia Helpis.
- Tampia Priscilla, along with her husband, Lucius Volusius Zosimus, dedicated a tomb for Zosimus parents, the elder Lucius Volusius Zosimus, and Volusia Stratonice, nurse of the pontifex Lucius Volusius Saturninus, dating between AD 30 and 70.
- Gaius Tampius Sabinus, prefect and tribune of the plebs at Pompeii in Campania.
- Tampia Ɔ. l., a freedwoman buried in a first-century tomb at Rome, along with the freedman Lucius Tampius Vitalis, according to an inscription of dubious authenticity.
- Lucius Tampius Ɔ. l. Vitalis, a freedman buried in a first-century tomb at Rome, along with the freedwoman Tampia, according to an inscription of dubious authenticity.
- Tampia Hygia, dedicated a tomb at Rome, dating from the reign of Nero, for her son, Tiberius Claudius Tiberinus, a freedman of the emperor.
- Lucius Tampius Flavianus, (Note: Erroneously called Titus Ampius or "Amplius Fabianus" in some sources.) was consul suffectus in an uncertain year during the reign of Nero, then governor of Africa and Pannonia. He was a general of some achievement, and received the triumphal ornaments for his victories. During the Year of the Four Emperors, Tampius took the side of Vespasian, although he was connected by marriage to Vitellius. He was accused of treachery, but absolved by Vespasian, who raised him to the consulship again in AD 76.
- Lucius Tampius Rufus, a kinsman of Lucius Tampius Flavianus, although the nature of their relationship is unclear from the fragmentary inscription in which he is mentioned.
- Tampia Venusta, buried at Casinum in Samnium, along with her husband, Quintus Venafranius Probus, in a tomb dating from the first century, or the early part of the second.
- Publius Tampius Verecundus, buried at Casinum, in a first- or second-century tomb dedicated by his children, Vettia Zmyrna and Tampilus Verecundinus.
- Tampius, dedicated a tomb at Florentia in Etruria for his daughter, Quadratilla, dating to the latter half of the first century, or the first half of the second.
- Quintus Tampius Terminalis, buried at Rome in a tomb dedicated by Tampia Urbica, dating to the late first century, or the first half of the second.
- Tampia Urbica, dedicated a tomb at Rome for Quintus Tampius Terminalis, dating to the late first century, or the first half of the second.
- Lucius Tampius, a soldier stationed at Rome around AD 135.
- Tampius Rufinus, prefect of the Cohors II Flavia Commagenorum, a cohort of auxilia recruited from Commagene and stationed in Dacia, made a second-century offering to Diana at Micia, a Roman fort in Dacia.
- Gaius Tampius Sabinus, mentioned in a second-century inscription from Ferentinum in Latium.
- Tampius Secularis, buried at Salona in Dalmatia, aged about seventy, in a third-century tomb dedicated by his son, Tampius Marcellus.
- Tampius Marcellus, dedicated a third-century tomb at Salona for his father, Tampius Secularis.

=== Undated Tampii ===
- Tampia L. f., made an offering to Jupiter at Aquileia.
- Lucius Tampius Alypus, dedicated a tomb at Rome for himself and his wife, Pontia Secunda.
- Tampia Ɔ. l. Auge, a freedwoman named in an inscription from Aquinum in Latium.
- Gaius Tampius Diophantus, a freedman buried at Musarna in Etruria.
- Quintus Tampius Hermeros, dedicated a tomb at Pisae in Etruria for his wife of eighteen years, Scribonia Hedone.
- Tampia C. f. Sabina, a woman buried at Musarna.

== See also ==
- List of Roman gentes

== Bibliography ==
- Publius Cornelius Tacitus, Historiae.
- Dictionary of Greek and Roman Biography and Mythology, William Smith, ed., Little, Brown and Company, Boston (1849).
- Theodor Mommsen et alii, Corpus Inscriptionum Latinarum (The Body of Latin Inscriptions, abbreviated CIL), Berlin-Brandenburgische Akademie der Wissenschaften (1853–present).
- Notizie degli Scavi di Antichità (News of Excavations from Antiquity, abbreviated NSA), Accademia dei Lincei (1876–present).
- René Cagnat et alii, L'Année épigraphique (The Year in Epigraphy, abbreviated AE), Presses Universitaires de France (1888–present).
- George Davis Chase, "The Origin of Roman Praenomina", in Harvard Studies in Classical Philology, vol. VIII, pp. 103–184 (1897).
- Paul von Rohden, Elimar Klebs, & Hermann Dessau, Prosopographia Imperii Romani (The Prosopography of the Roman Empire, abbreviated PIR), Berlin (1898).
- Epigrafia della produzione e della distribuzione (Epigraphy of Production and Distribution), Rome (1994).
