= Pietà (Sebastiano del Piombo) =

Painting by Sebastiano del Piombo

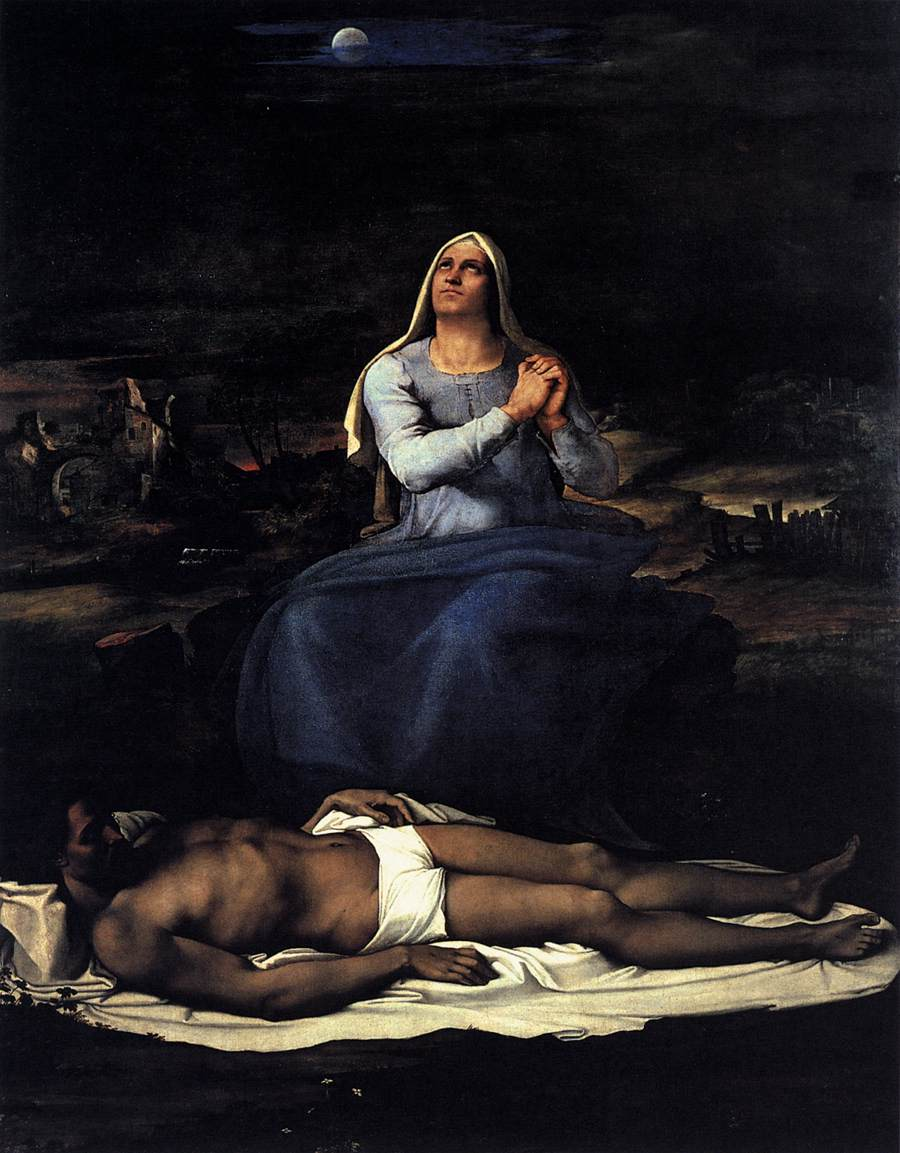
Pietà (c. 1516–1517) by Sebastiano del Piombo

Pietà is an oil on panel painting by Sebastiano del Piombo, executed c. 1516–1517, now in the Museo Civico located in the former cloister of the monastery adjacent to the church of Santa Maria della Verità, Viterbo, region of Lazio, Italy.

It is the earliest evidence of collaboration between del Piombo and Michelangelo (with the latter providing the cartoon for the work, as confirmed by the existence of preparatory studies) and was commissioned for the church of San Francesco, Viterbo by Giovanni Botonti.

== Sources ==
- (in Italian) Pierluigi De Vecchi ed Elda Cerchiari, I tempi dell'arte, vol. 2, Milano, Bompiani, 1999, ISBN 88-451-7212-0.
- Pierluigi De Vecchi ed Elda Cerchiari (1999). I tempi dell'arte. Vol. 2. Milano: Bompiani. ISBN 88-451-7212-0.
- Costanza Barbieri (2004). Notturno Sublime. Sebastiano e Michelangelo nella Pietà di Viterbo. Roma: Viviani arte. ISBN 978-887-993-100-7.
- Andrea Alessi (2007). Dante, Sebastiano e Michelangelo. L'Inferno nella Pietà di VIterbo. Milano: Electa-Mondadori. ISBN 978-883-705-375-8.
- Andrea Alessi (2008). Dante, Sebastiano e Michelangelo. Nuove riflessioni sulla Pietà di Viterbo, in Sebastiano del Piombo 1485-1547, catalogo della mostra a cura di Claudio Strinati. Milano: Motta editore. ISBN 978-185-709-608-8.
- Paul Johannides, Matthias Wivel, ed. (2017). Sebastiano & Michelangelo. Catalogo della mostra. London: National Gallery of London. ISBN 978-1857096088.
- Andrea Alessi (2020). Eretici non eretici. Vittoria Colonna, Michelangelo e il circolo degli spirituali. Roma: La Lepre edizioni. ISBN 978-88-9938-977-2.
- Andrea Alessi (2020). Sebastiano & Michelangelo nella città dei papi. Roma: La Lepre edizioni. ISBN 978-888-929-167-2.
