= Palazzo del Podestà, Viterbo =

13th-century palace in Viterbo, Italy

Coordinates: 42.41718°N 12.10507°E

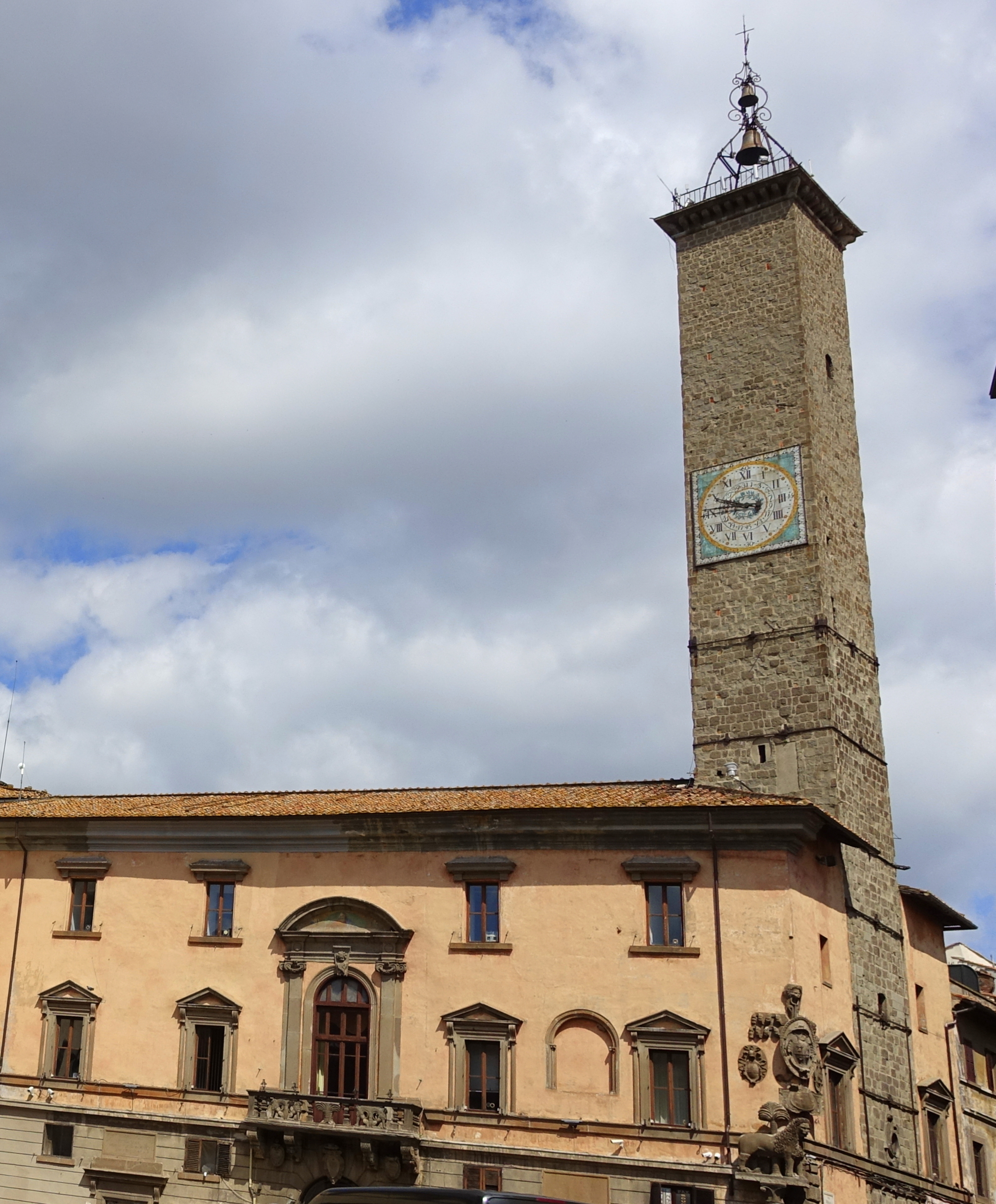
Palazzo dei Podestà

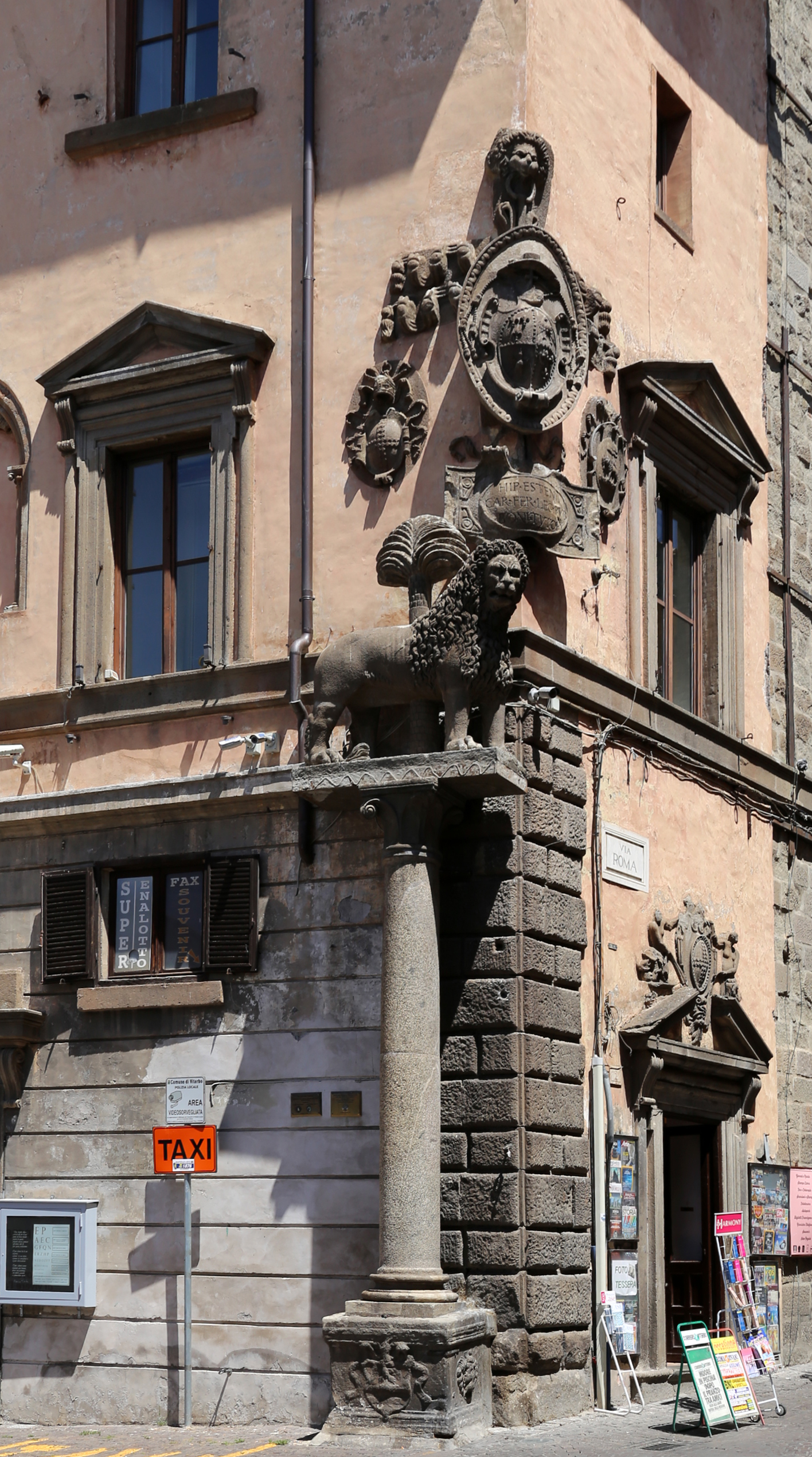
South corner of facade with symbol of Viterbo

The Palazzo del Podesta, also known as Palazzo del Governatore, is a 13th-century civic palace located in Piazza del Plebiscito in central Viterbo, region of Lazio, Italy. It is attached and mainly accessible through the arch over Via Filippo Ascenzi connecting it to the larger Palazzo della Commune or Comunale.

This palace has a tall stone bell-tower (Torre del Orologio formerly Torre dei Monaldeschi) rising behind it; the tower at about its midpoint has a clock, first added in the 15th-century. The largest bell in the tower derives from the church of Santa Maria della Verita. Diagonally across the piazza is the church of Sant'Angelo in Spatha, which has a marble replica of the Ancient Roman Sarcophagus of Bella Galiana on the facade.

== History ==
This building presently houses the main municipal offices, while the Podesta is mainly part of the civic museums. It was originally built as the Palazzo of the Capitano del Popolo in 1264. The construction of this and the Palazzo dei Priori took place after the victory by Viterbo over the Hohenstaufen emperor Frederick II in 1243. In 1700, a large balcony was added to the piano nobile. The facade was refurbished over the centuries and now display classical window and portal treatments. The 44-meter-tall (144 ft) clock tower was rebuilt in 1487 after the prior structure was razed. The clock dial was painted in 1816 by Domenico Costa.

On the south corner of the piazza facade are a series of heraldic shields and a column with a lion and palm tree, symbols of Viterbo. Across the Piazza is the baroque Palazzo della Prefettura which also has a lion atop a column on the southern corner of the facade. This medieval lion sculpture was once in the Palazzo del Priori on the main stairs.

On the piano nobile there are two large ceramic panels (donated by masters of Deruta) that depict the long conclave (1269) for the election of Pope Gregory X. It shows the papal palace roofless and includes 5 popes that have been elected in Viterbo. the groundfloor of the palace has shops and the Cafe Centrale.
