= Lorenzo da Viterbo =

Italian painter

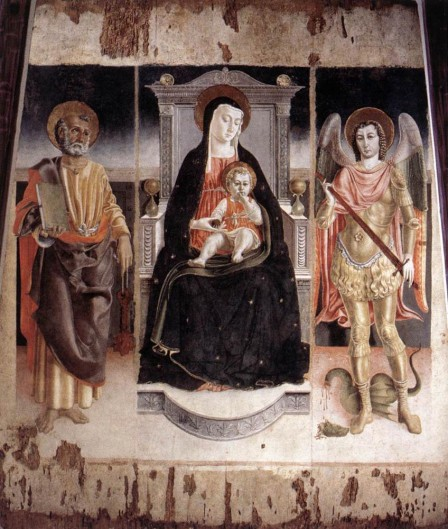
Madonna Enthroned with the Infant Christ, St Peter and St Michael (1472), Galleria Nazionale d'Arte Antica, Rome

Lorenzo da Viterbo was an early Renaissance style painter, active in Lazio and Tuscany.

He was probably educated in Rome under Piero della Francesca (frescoes in the d'Estouteville chapel in Santa Maria Maggiore, 1459). He was a contemporary of together with Antoniazzo Romano.

Circa 1464-66, he frescoed Scenes from the Life of Christ for the chapel and Illustrious Men for the loggia of the Orsini Palace at Tagliacozzo, at the service of the brothers and dukes Napoleone and Roberto Orsini.

In 1468-69 he frescoed Scenes from the Life of the Virgin Mary for the Mazzatosta Chapel in the Servite Church of Santa Maria della Verità in Viterbo. In the fresco depicting the Marriage of the Virgin there is an animated portrait of notable contemporary citizens of Viterbo. The frescoes were nearly destroyed by the bombardments during World War II, and have been painstakingly restored.

Lorenzo was in Florence in 1473: his protector, the Sienese Cardinal Jacopo Ammannati Piccolomini, recommended the artist to Lorenzo il Magnifico in a letter written from his villa in Monsindoli in the vicinity of Siena.

The Academy of Fine Arts of Viterbo is named after the painter.
