= Titus Ampius Balbus =

Ancient Roman politician

Titus Ampius Balbus, son of Titus, was a Plebeian politician of Ancient Rome. He was of the Ampia gens, members of the Roman tribe of Horatia, and lived in the 1st century BCE. The writer Cicero called him "the trumpet of the Civil War".

Titus served as tribune of the plebs in 63 BCE, and proposed, in conjunction with his colleague Titus Labienus, that Pompey, who was then absent from Rome, should, on account of his victories in Asia, be allowed to wear a laurel-crown and all the insignia of a triumph in the Roman circus, and also a laurel crown and the toga praetexta in the scenic games.

He failed in his first attempt to obtain the aedileship, although he was supported by Pompey; but he appears to have been praetor in 59 BCE, as we find that he was the proconsul of Asia in 58 BCE. Some cistophori of his exist, minted with his name and bearing an unusual symbol of a sacrificial tripod.

On the breaking out of Caesar's civil war in 49 BCE, Titus sided with the Pompeian party, and took an active part in the levy of troops at Capua with Lucius Cornelius Lentulus Crus, under whom he appears to have been serving as legate. He no doubt left Italy with the rest of his party, for we find him in the next year endeavoring to obtain money by plundering the temple of Diana in Ephesus, which he was prevented from doing only by the arrival of Julius Caesar. With Lentulus he helped raise two legions in the province of Asia, though the Roman-Jewish historian Josephus also mentions Titus as having implemented Lentulus's law exempting the province's Jews from military service.

Balbus was one of those who was banished by Caesar; but he afterwards obtained his pardon through the intercession of his friend Cicero, who wrote him a letter on the occasion, in 46 BCE.

Balbus appears to have written some work on the history of his times, possibly a biography of Julius Caesar; for the Roman historian Suetonius quotes some remarks of Caesar's from a work of Titus Ampius. Some scholars have raised some suspicions about the extent to which Balbus -- a staunch Pompey partisan -- might have twisted Caesar's words or quoted him out of context to show him in a profoundly arrogant, hubristic light, as the quote Balbus attributes to Caesar ("the res publica is nothing") is quite shocking. Balbus was also mentioned in the fourth book of the writer Marcus Terentius Varro, "De Vita Populi Romani."
