= Ampia gens =

Ancient Roman family

The gens Ampia was a plebeian family at Rome, during the last century of the Republic, and into the first century AD. The first member of the gens to achieve prominence was Titus Ampius Balbus, who was first tribune of the plebs, then held the praetorship in 59 BC.

== Praenomina ==
The only praenomen associated with the known members of the gens is Titus.

== Branches and cognomina ==
The only cognomen of this gens which occurs under the Republic is Balbus, a common surname originally referring to the habit of stammering. The cognomen Flavianus used by another member of the gens may have been a personal surname, perhaps reflecting a family connection with the Flavii, since the man who bore it was already of advanced years before the first of the Flavian emperors came to power.

== Members ==
- Titus Ampius Balbus, tribune of the plebs in 63, and praetor in 59 BC.
- Titus Ampius Flavianus, governor of Pannonia during the wars following the death of the emperor Nero, in AD 69.

== See also ==
- List of Roman gentes
