= Fontana di Piazza della Rocca, Viterbo =

Fountain in Viterbo

Coordinates: 42.42189°N 12.10541°E

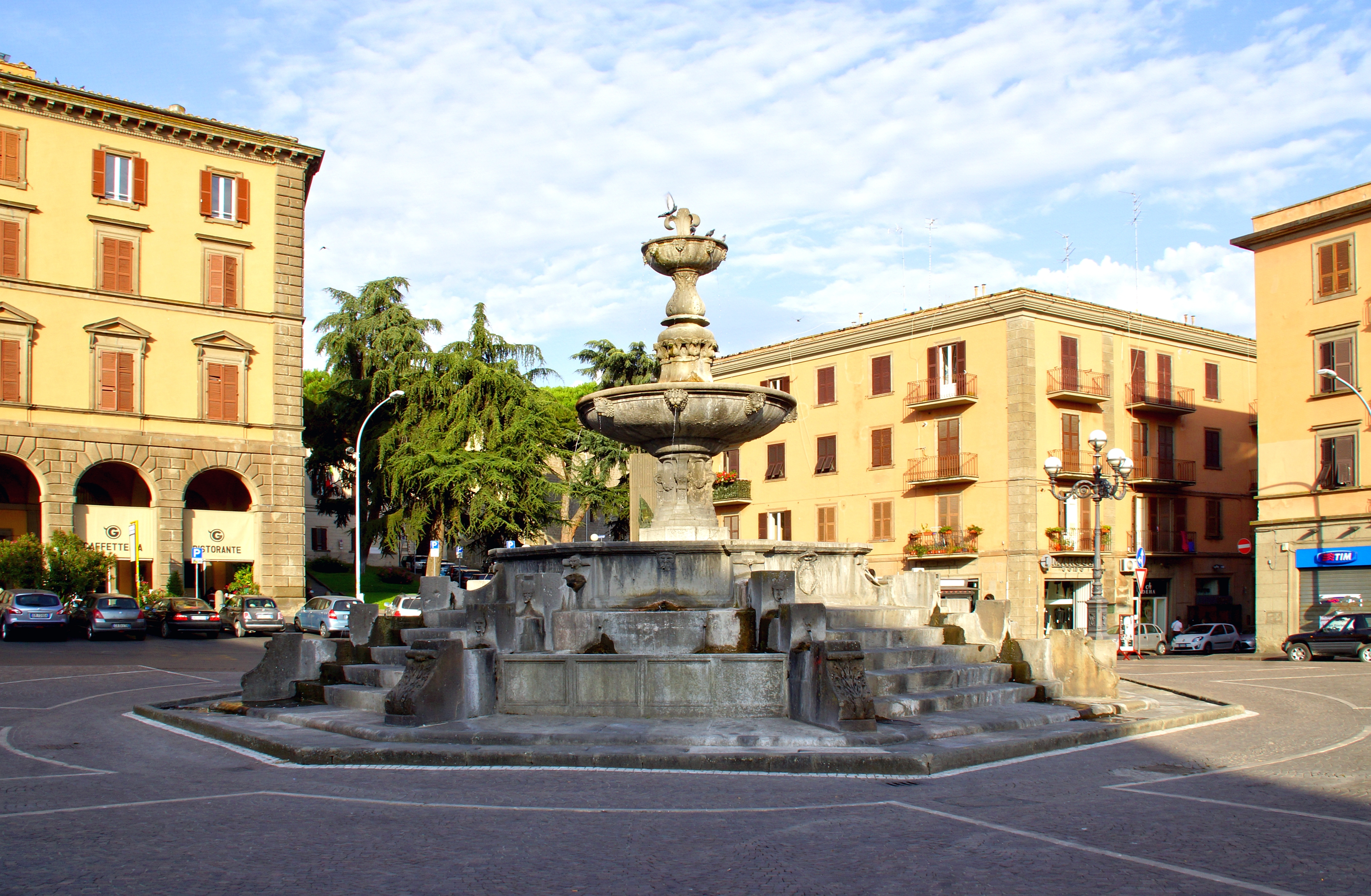
Fontana della Rocca with a few arches of Palazzo Grandori to the left

The Fontana di Piazza della Rocca, sometimes shortened to Fontana della Rocca and once called Fontana di San Pietro alla Rocca, is a Renaissance-style fountain located in a piazza in front of the Rocca Albornoz (Albornoz Castle), the Porta Fiorentina (Florentine gate), and the Palazzo Grandori, in the northern sector of historic Viterbo, region of Lazio, Italy.

== History ==
A fountain known as San Pietro alla Rocca was present here since prior to the 15th century. It was refurbished in that era by addition of a large collecting pool. By 1576, under the patronage of Cardinal Alessandro Farnese, a new design was commissioned from the prominent Mannerist architect Vignola. The structure showed some flaws, attributed to the masonry performed by Paolo Cenni). Subsequently, this was repaired by Giovanni Malanca and Antonio di Pietro.
