= Sarcophagus of Bella Galiana =

Etruscan or Roman sarcophagus

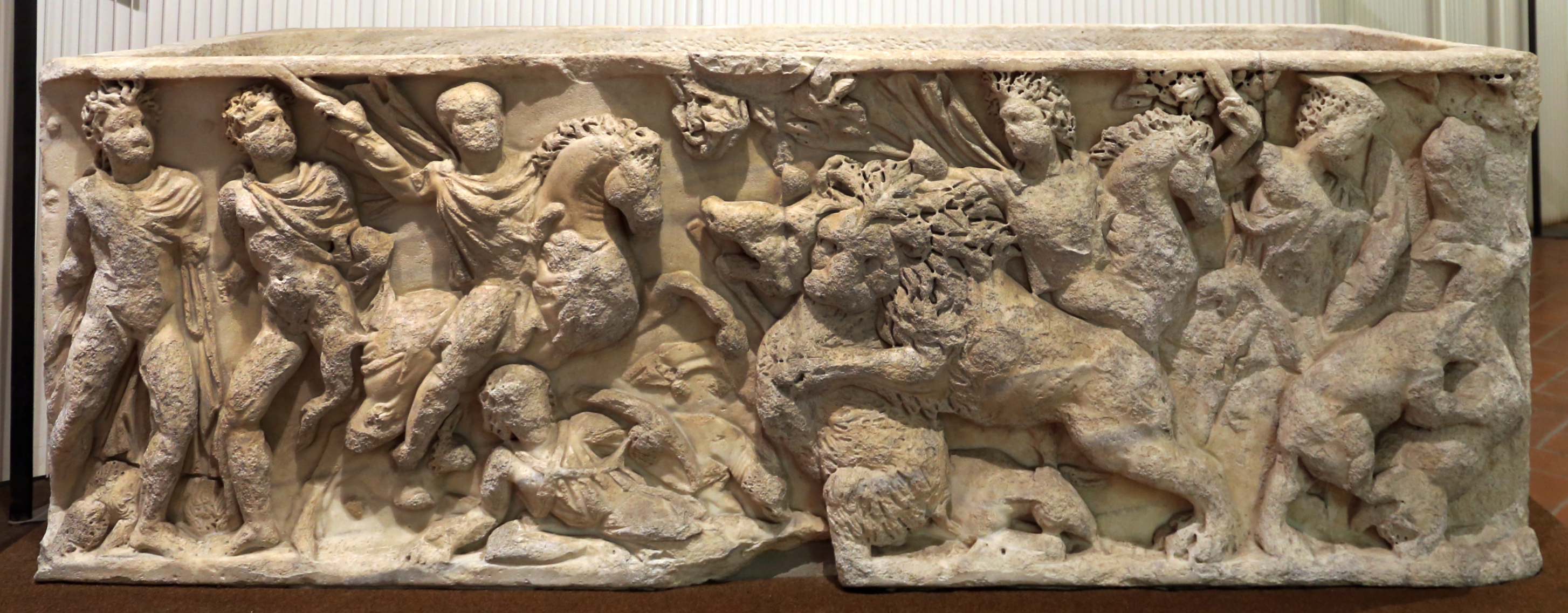
Ancient Sarcophagus in Museo Civico

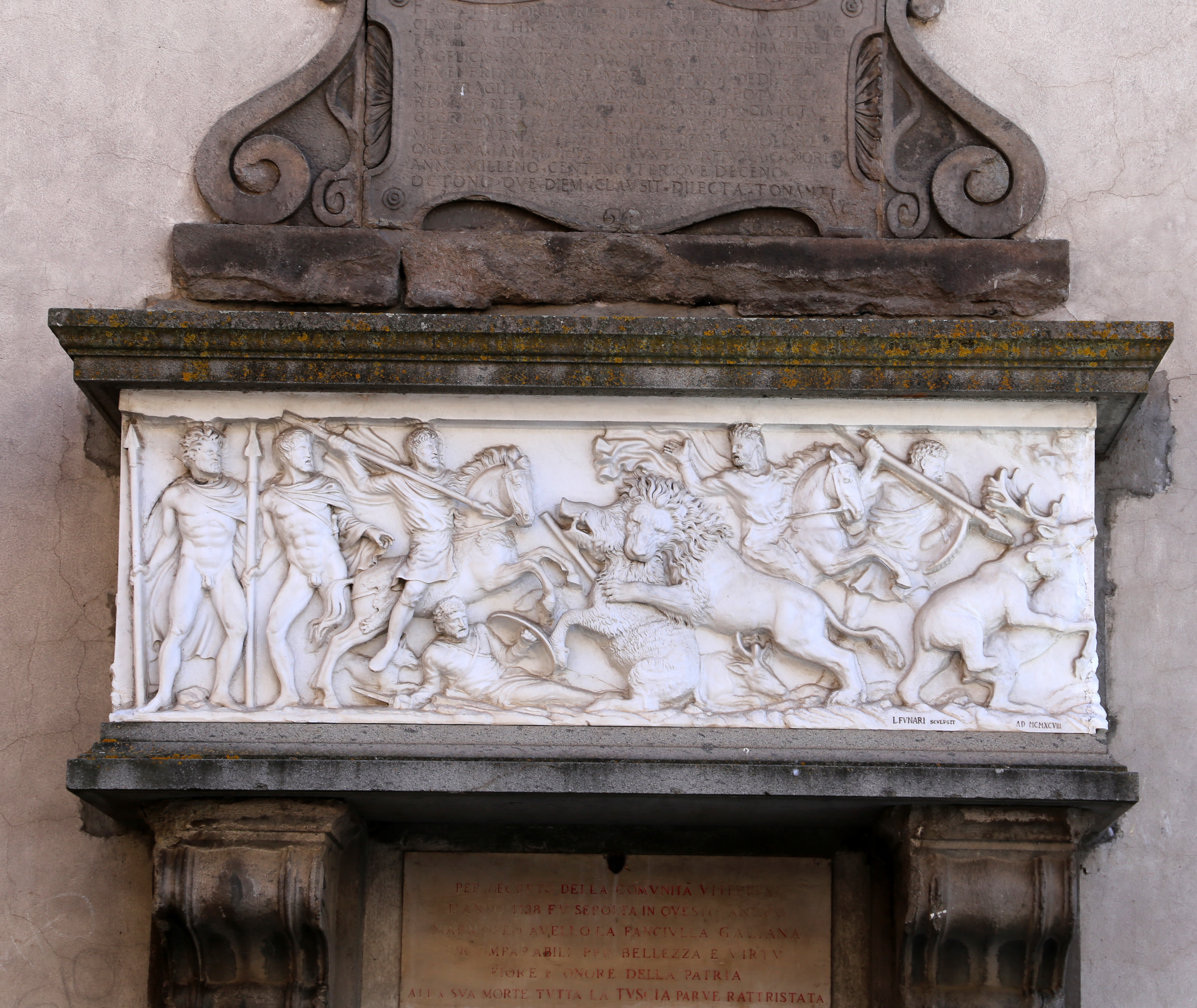
Copy of Sarcophagus on Sant'Angelo in Spatha

The original Sarcophagus of Bella Galiana is an Ancient Etruscan or more likely 3rd century Roman marble sarcophagus on display inside the Museo Civico of the town of Viterbo, region of Lazio, Italy. The deep relief sculpture depicts a hunting scene, which was a popular decoration for such sarcophagi. The scene is described by some as a version of the myth of the hunt of the Calydonian boar. A marble copy of the sarcophagus replaced the Ancient Roman original, which had been displayed outside on the facade of the church of Sant'Agnelo in Spatha standing across from the Palazzo dei Priori, Viterbo. Somehow the story on the facade has been linked to a popular legend, predating the 15th-century, regarding the life and death of a beautiful young woman, the Bella Galiana (Beautiful Galliana), of Viterbo.

== Scene on the Sarcophagus ==
Some sources sarcophagus was putatively discovered circa 1549 and placed on the facade of the church of Sant'Angelo in Spatha, then being restored. The plaque above the copy in the church is dated 1638. According to Annius of Viterbo the sarcophagus had originally belonged to Valerius Agricola, 6th praetor of Etruria during imperial Roman era. Recent studies claim the sarcophagus had been already discovered by 1369. Putatively, the Bella Galiana had been entombed in this sarcophagus. The original was removed from the elements in 1988.

The scene depicts from left to right, two standing spearmen, a man on a rearing horse spearing the boar, a fallen man with a shield warding the boar, the boar in the center being mauled in the neck by a lion, finally on the right is another horseman and hunter attacking a buck. A hunting dog and other elk complete the scene. While there are a number of classic Greek legends about boar hunts including that of the Calydonian boar attacked by a party including Meleager and Atalanta, and of the Erymanthian boar hunted by Heracles in his 4th labor. Neither of these legends involves a lion, however there is an additional legend that Atalanta and her lovers later were metamorphosed into lions. The actions of the lion in the Bella Galiana legend are said to be the reason for the lion to be a symbol of the town.

== Legend of the Bella Galiana and the Boar ==
One part of the tale is that in the distant pagan past, every year, citizens of Viterbo would sacrifice a young maiden to a savage boar who lived in the surrounding forest. It came by lot, that Galiana was chosen as the sacrificial victim, to the lament of the townspeople who knew of her beauty and virtue. Chained to a rock in the forest, when the boar approached to attack her, he in turn was slain by a fortuitous lion, who did not harm the maiden. The townspeople interpreting this as an omen of favor brought Galiana to town.

== Legend of the Bella Galiana and the Siege of Viterbo ==
This tale is likely independent in origin. Versions claim that a group of marauding noblemen, perhaps from Rome besieged the city unusuccessfully. Unable to breach the city, their leader had heard or seen her remarkable beauty of Galiana, and after being mortally wounded near the walls, he offered to order his troops to withdraw, if the townspeople allowed him only to see Galiana once from a distance. When she came to a tower in the walls, the wounded nobleman killed her with an arrow shot, leading both himself and Galiana to die.

An alternative version is that the nobleman, successful in breaching the walls, offered to spare the town if Galiana was gifted to him. Her father putatively killed his daughter and tossed her body over the walls ( or off a balcony) telling the nobleman that he could have her dead, but never alive. In both versions, the warring animus of men leads to Galiana's death. A balcony in town located on the stone medieval house on Via Aurelio Saffi #100 putatively is said to have been the balcony from where she was tossed.
