= Museo Civico, Viterbo =

Coordinates: 42.41738°N 12.11068°E

Civic Museum of Viterbo
- Museo Civico di Viterbo; Museo Luigi Rossi Danielli
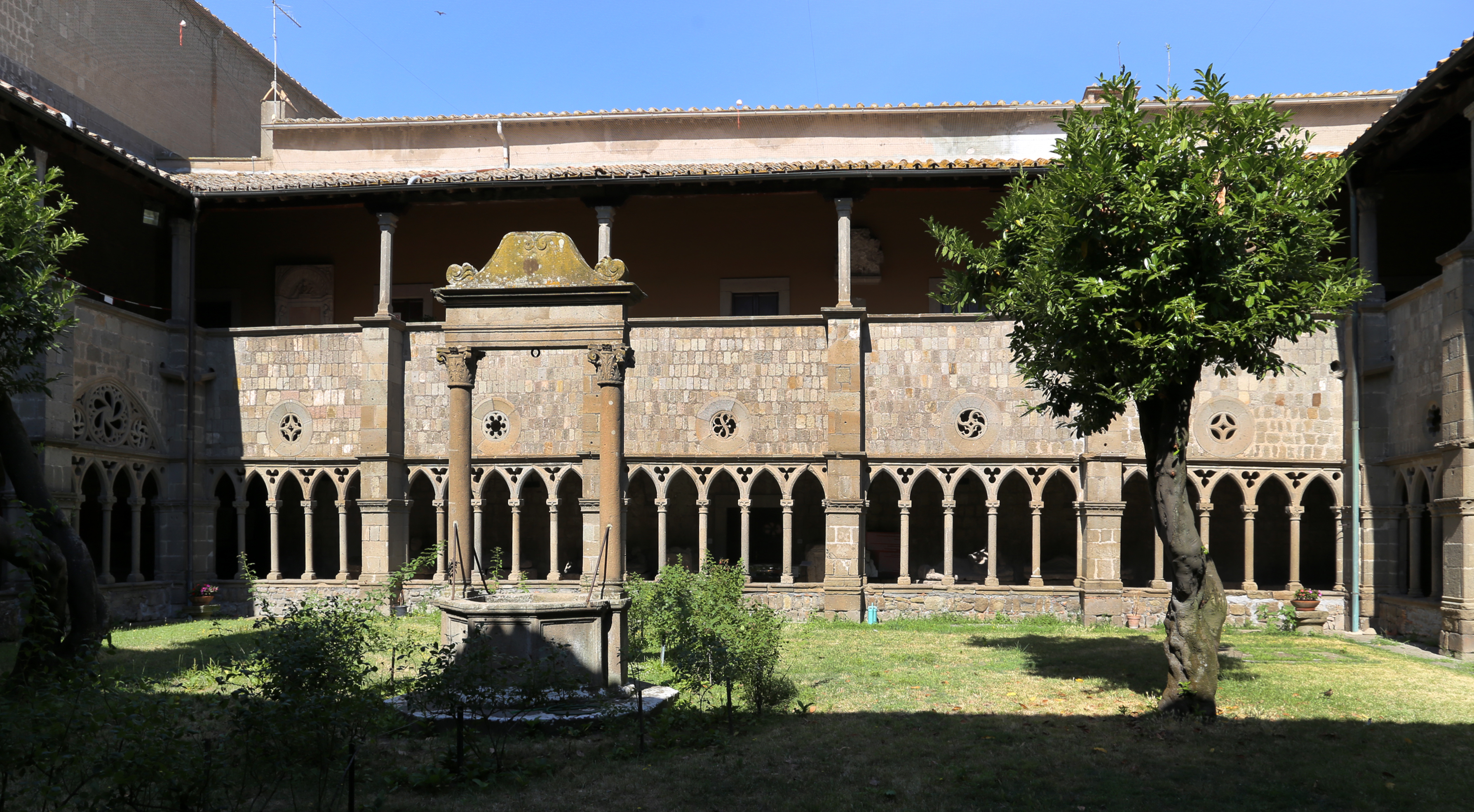
- Cloister of the Museum
- Established: 1955
- Location: Piazza Francesco Crispi #13, Viterbo, region of Lazio, Italy
- Type: Art and Archeology museum

Museo Civico di Viterbo (Italian for Civic Museum of Viterbo) is an archeologic and art museum located on Piazza Francesco Crispi #13 in Viterbo, region of Lazio, Italy. The museum is housed in the former 12th-century convent adjacent to the church of Santa Maria della Verità in the center of town.

== History ==
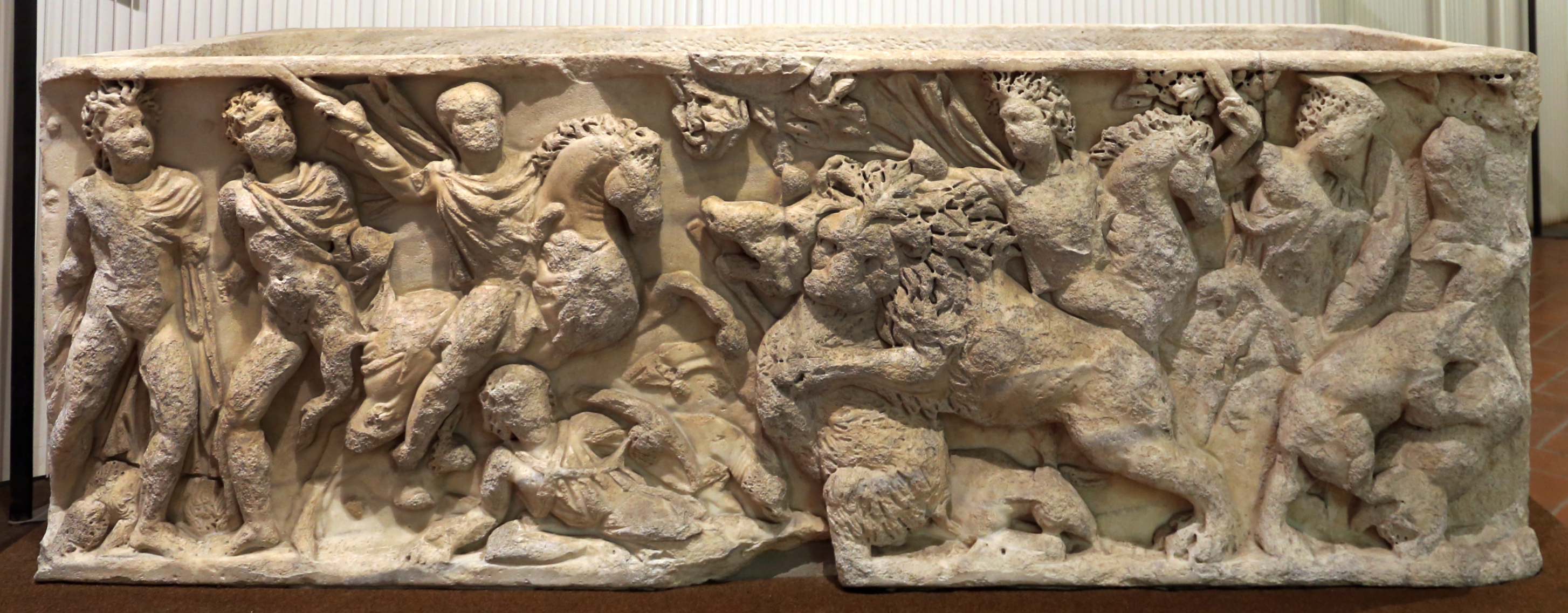
Bella Galiana Sarcophagus with hunting scene

The museum was founded in 1955, and since 2011 has been dedicated to Luigi Rossi Danielli, an architect from Viterbo. Around the cloister are a series of Etruscan sarcophagi from 4th to 3rd century BCE coming from tombs in Musarna, Cipollaretta, Norchia and Castel d’Asso. In the museum are also terracotta sarcophagi from the Etruscan town of Surina and the ancient Sarcophagus of Bella Galiana. There is also an archeologic collection from Musarna, Ferento, and San Giuliano, and donated in 1912 to his native city by Luigi Rossi Danielli.

The first floor houses the Pinacoteca or Art Gallery, established in the nineteenth century. It contains the artworks expropriated to the Church as a result of the law applied between 1870 and 1874.

== Collections ==
Among the works on display are:

- Madonna and Child, painted for the church of Almadiani
- Sphinx sculpture (1296) realized by Pasquale Romano.
- Two medieval forgeries, Marmo Osiriano (15th century) and the Decree of Desiderius by Annius of Viterbo
- Mystical Marriage of St Catherine (15th-century) by Pancrazio Jacovetti da Calvi, painted for the adjacent church of Santa Maria della Verità.
- Deposition by Costantino di Jacopo Zelli, painted for the adjacent church of Santa Maria della Verità.
- Pietà (1516–1517) and Flagellation (1524) by Sebastiano del Piombo
- Bust of Saint John the Baptist and lunette with Madonna and Child with Angels by studio of Andrea della Robbia.
- Nativity with St John the Baptist and St Bartholomew (1488) by Antonio del Massaro (Il Pastura), commissioned for the Guzzi family chapel in the adjacent church of Santa Maria della Verità.
- Enthroned Madonna and Child by Francesco d’Antonio Zacchi (Il Balletta).
- Madonna and Child by Antoniazzo Romano
- Madonna and Child attributed to Vitale da Bologna
- St Bernardino and Angels by Sano di Pietro.
- Adoration of the Magi by Cesare Nebbia
- Death of the Virgin and St Sebastian by Aurelio Lomi
- Incredulity of St Thomas (1636–37) attributed to Salvator Rosa painted for the Chapel of the Confraternita dell'Orazione e della Morte in Viterbo
- St Leonardo and Prisoners by Anton Angelo Bonifazi (1627–1699)
- Holy Family adored by Saints by Antonio Ghepardi
- Rest in Egypt, Assumption of the Virgin, Annunciation and Hercules and Omphale (1657) by Giovanni Francesco Romanelli
- Presentation of Jesus at the Temple by Antiveduto Grammatica
- Death of the Virgin by Marco Benefial
- Sacrifice of Polyxena by Domenico Corvi
- Sketches of the lost frescoes by Benozzo Gozzoli painted for the church of Santa Rosa, Viterbo, copied by Francesco Sabatini
- Fifty-six sketches of the macchina of Saint Rosa
- Sarcophagus of Bella Galiana
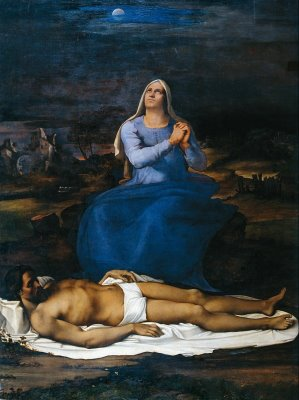
Pieta by Sebastiano del Piombo

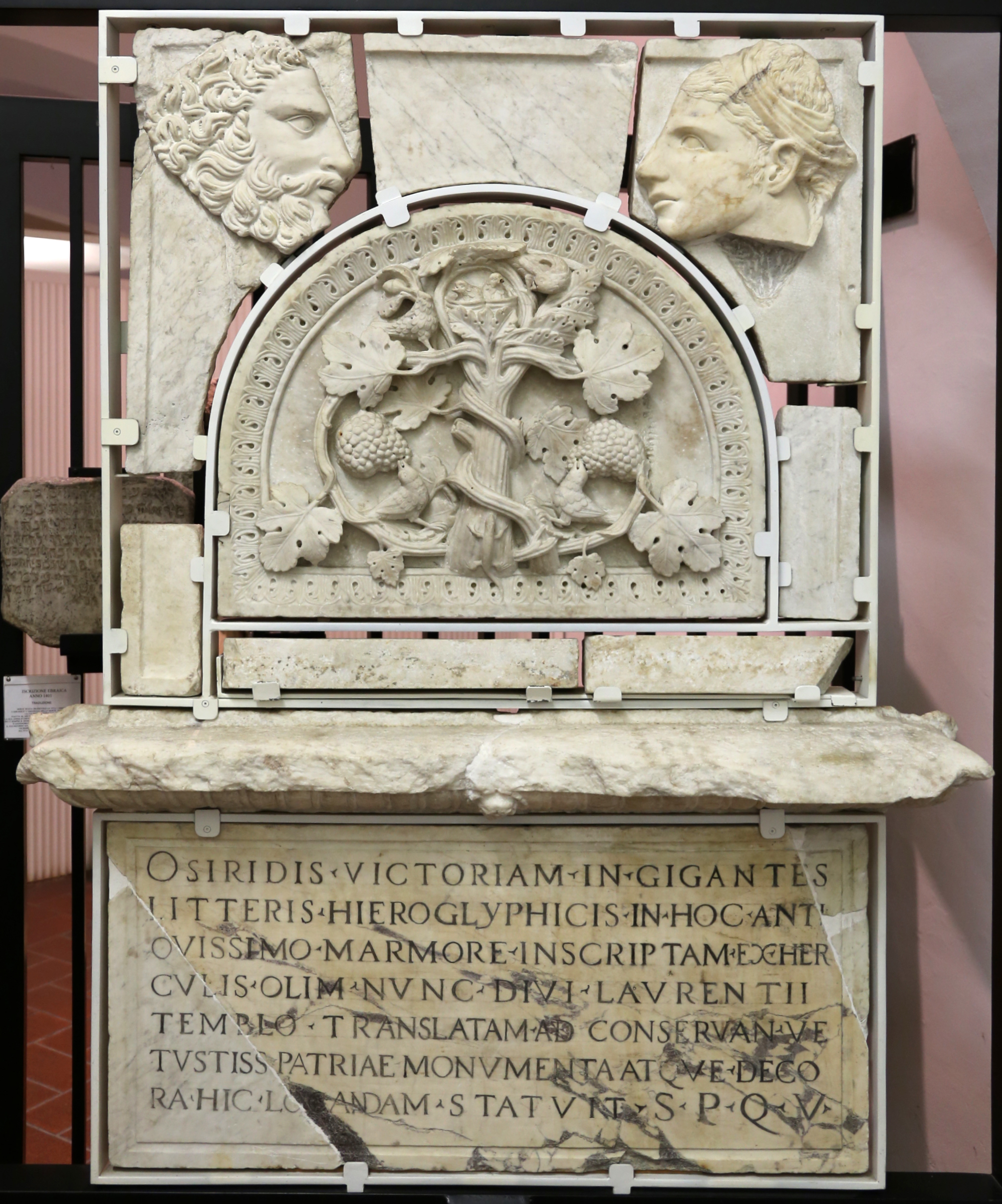
Marmo Osiriano

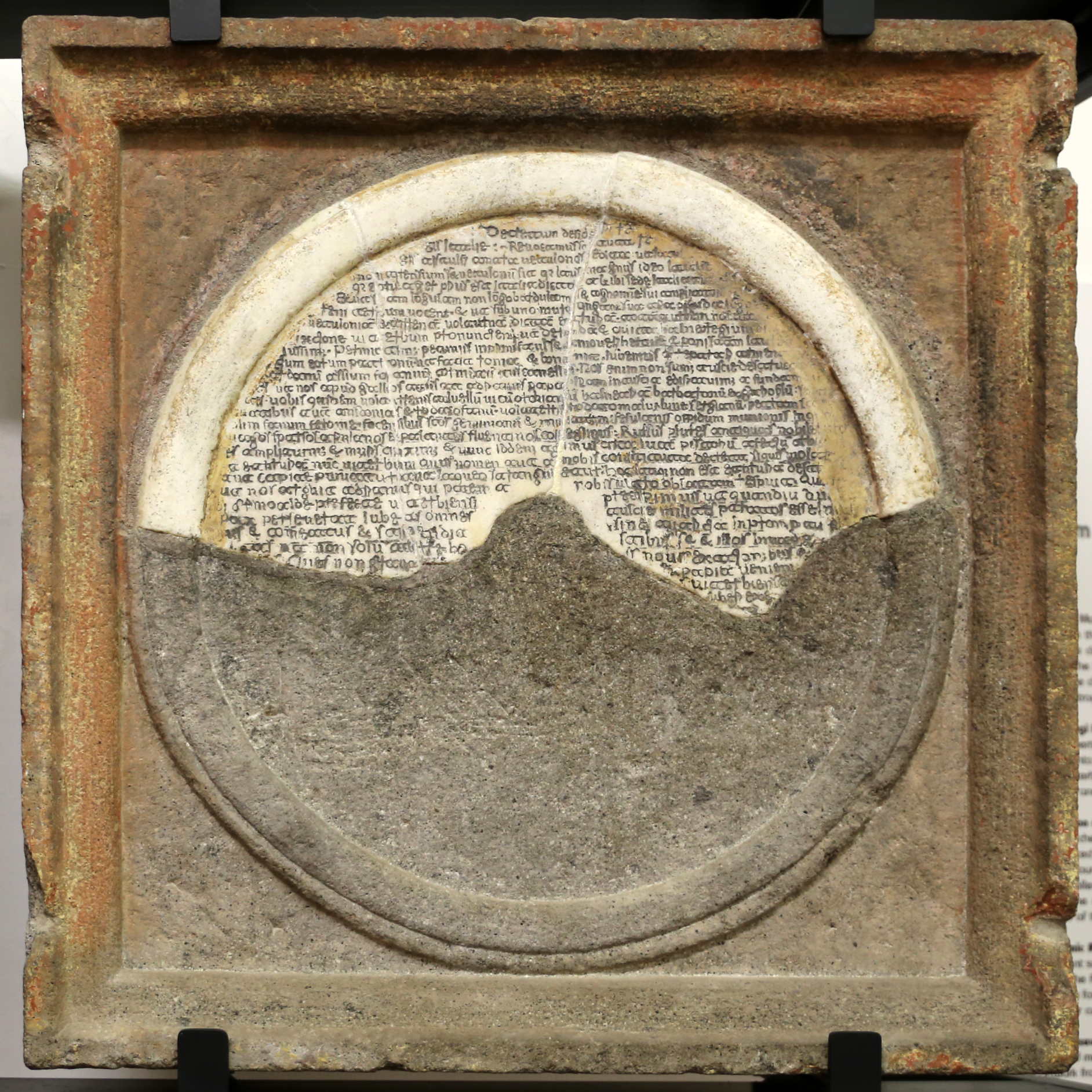
Decreto di Desiderio

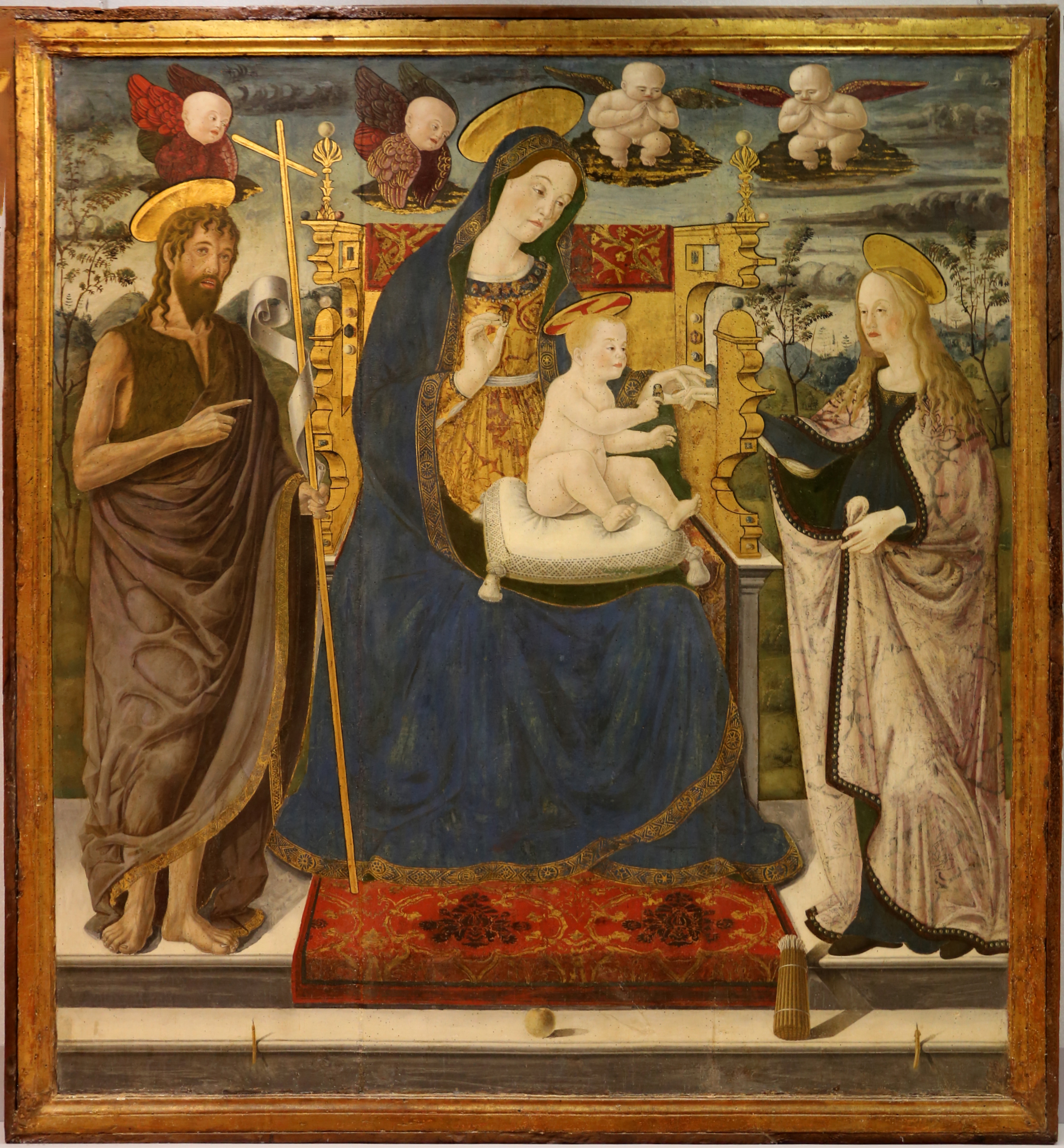
Mystical Marriage of St Catherine by Pancrazio di Antonello da Calvi

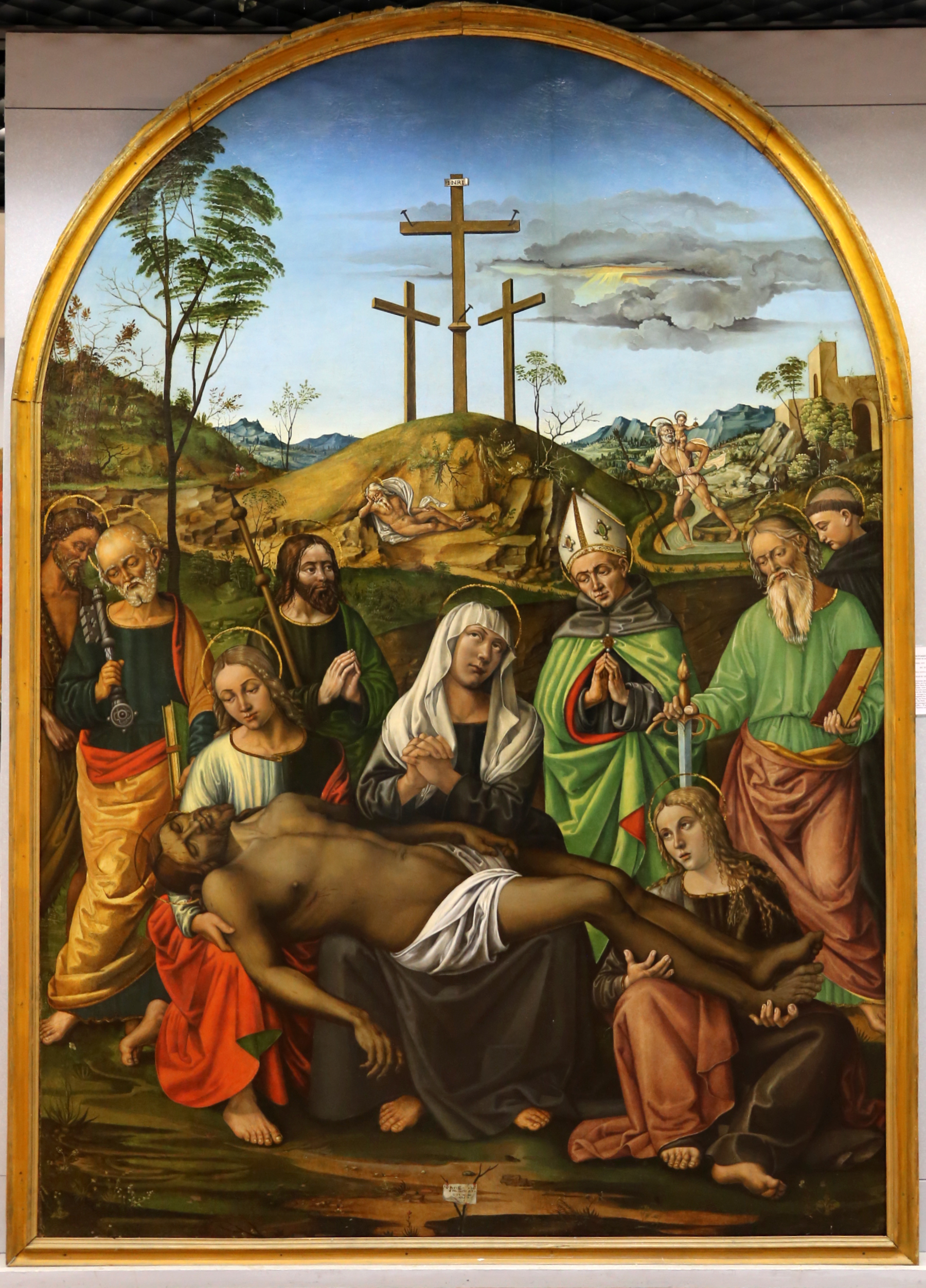
Deposition by Costantino di Jacopo Zelli

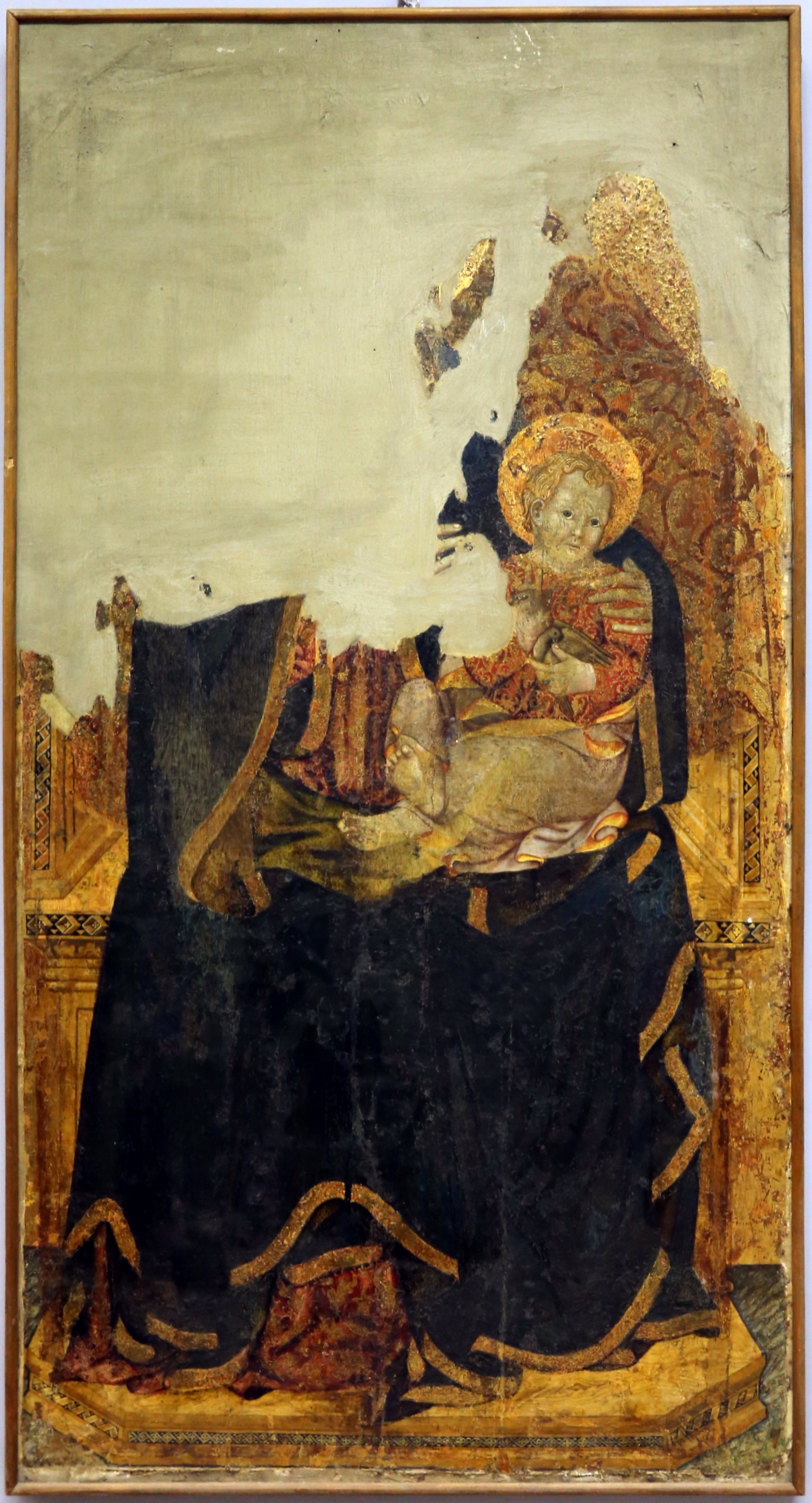
Enthroned Madonna by Il Balletta

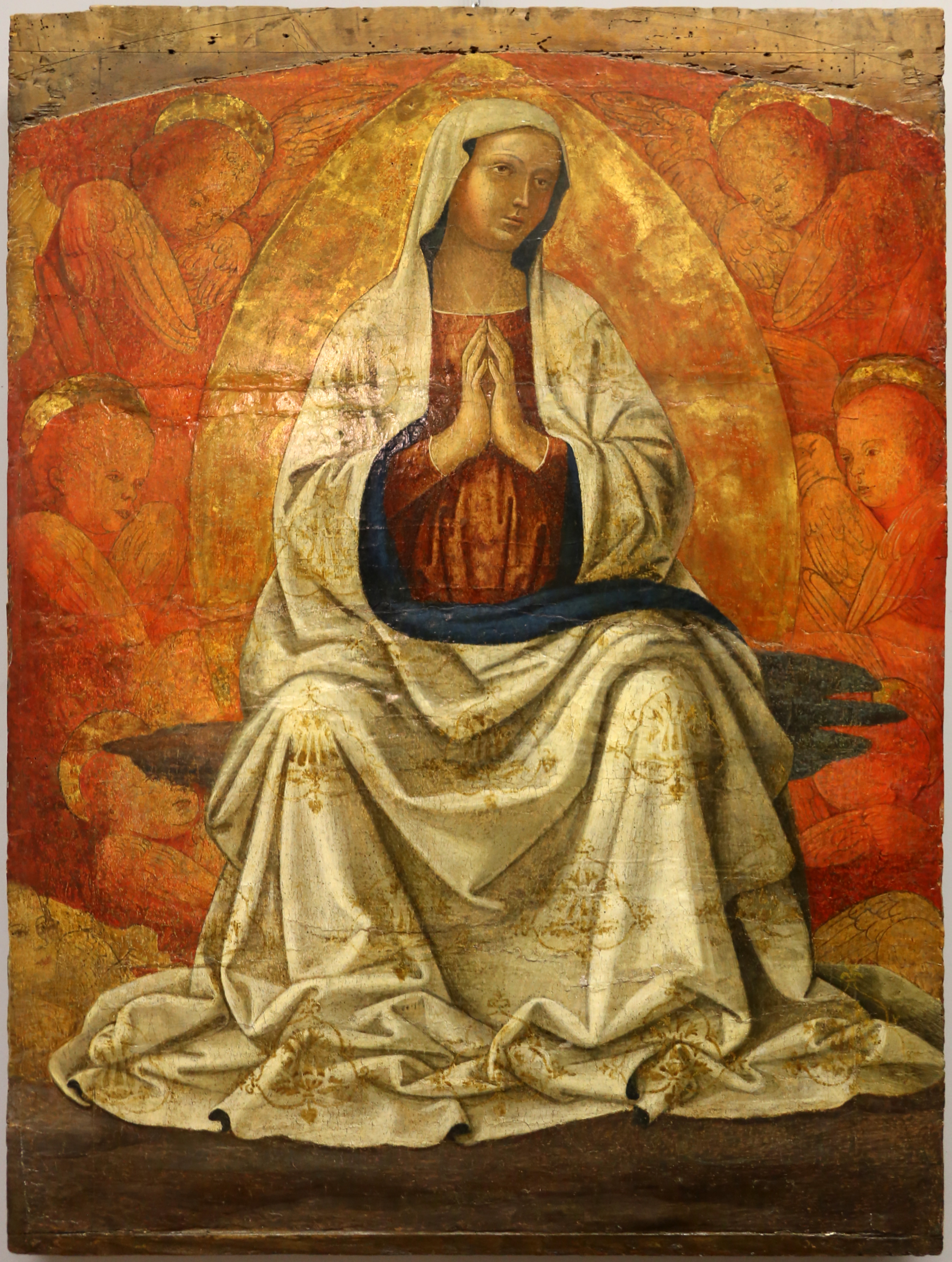
Madonna in Glory by Antoniazzo Romano

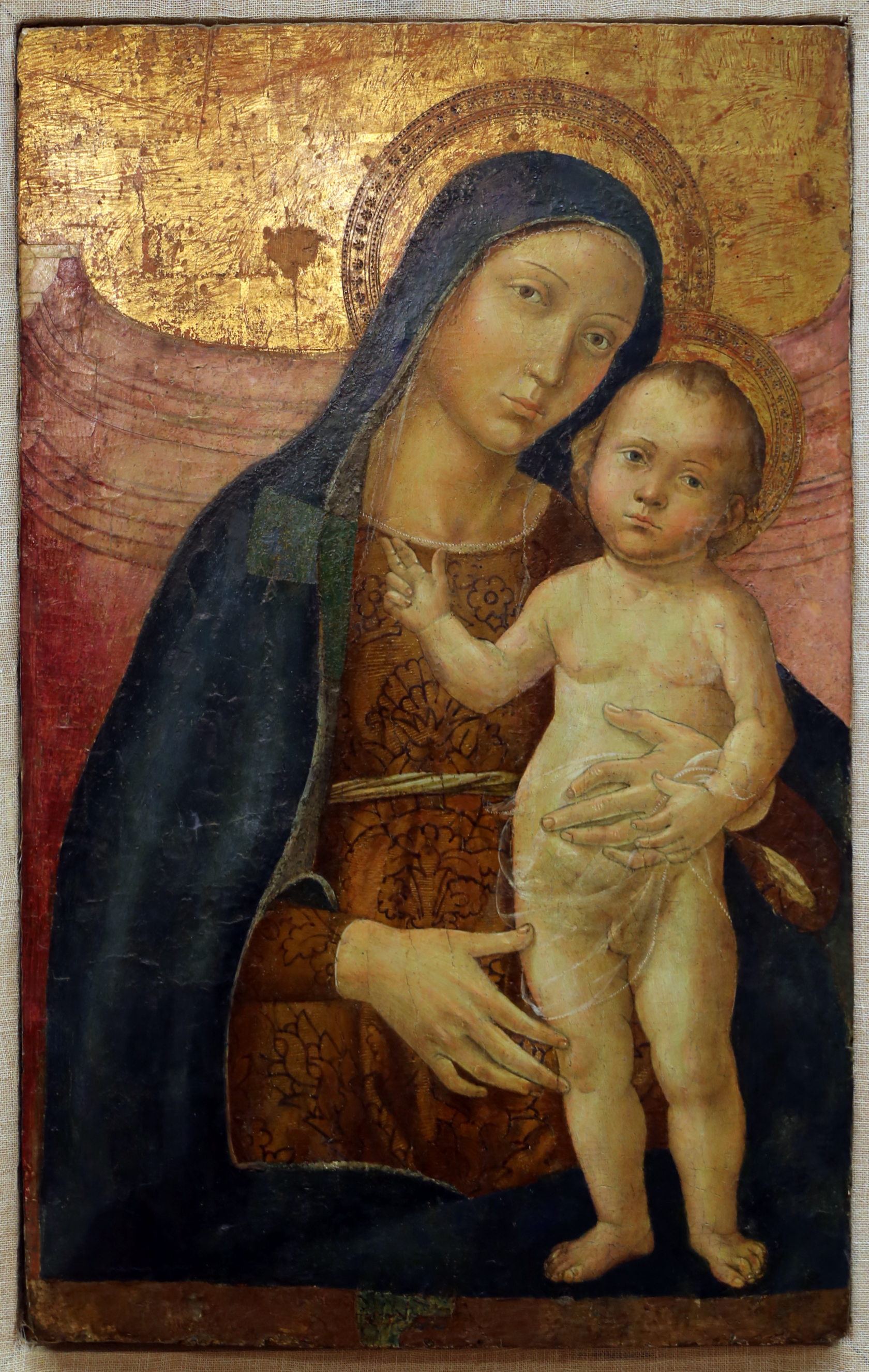
Madonna and Child by Antoniazzo Romano

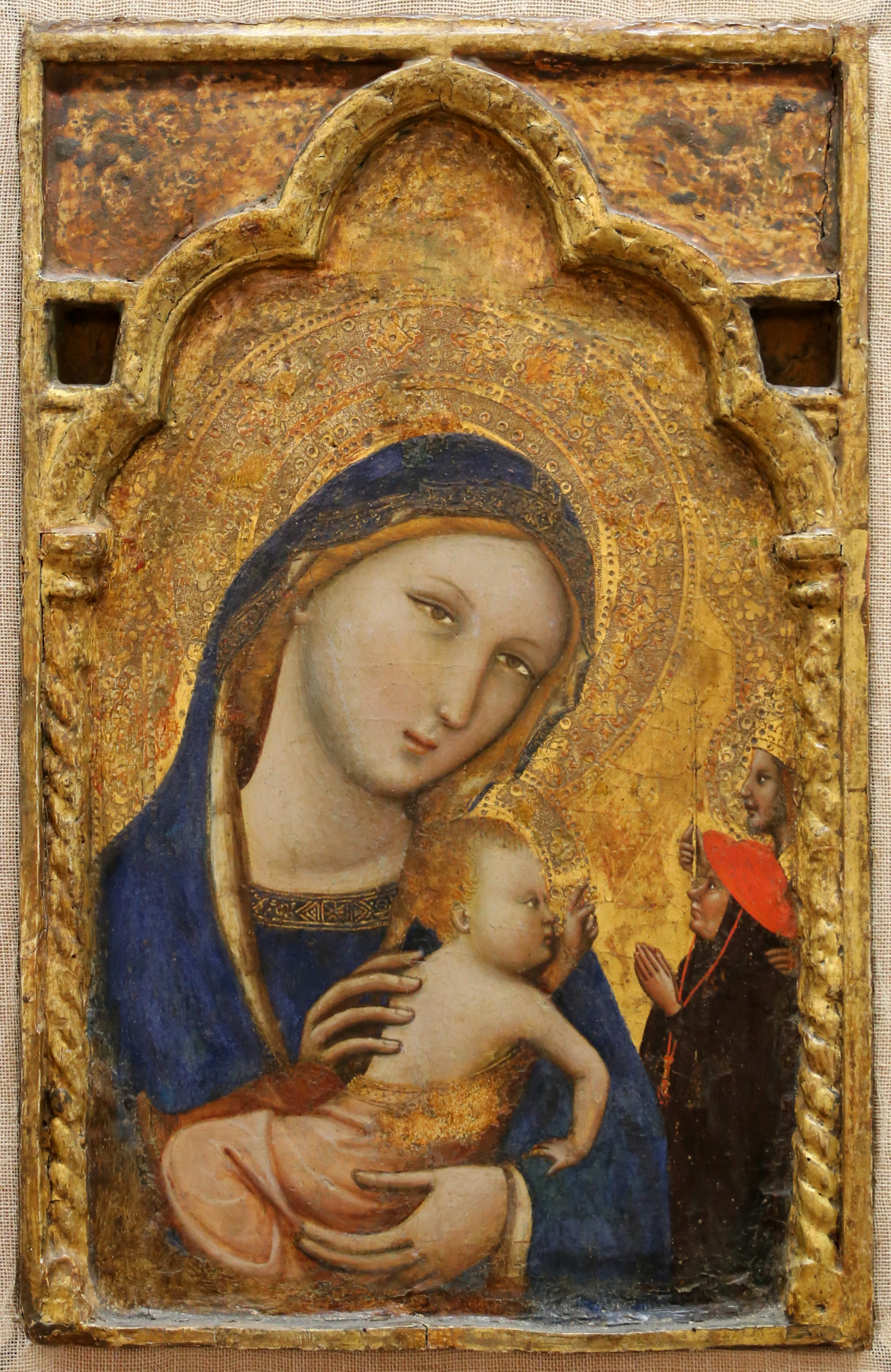
Madonna, child, and bishops by Vitale da Bologna

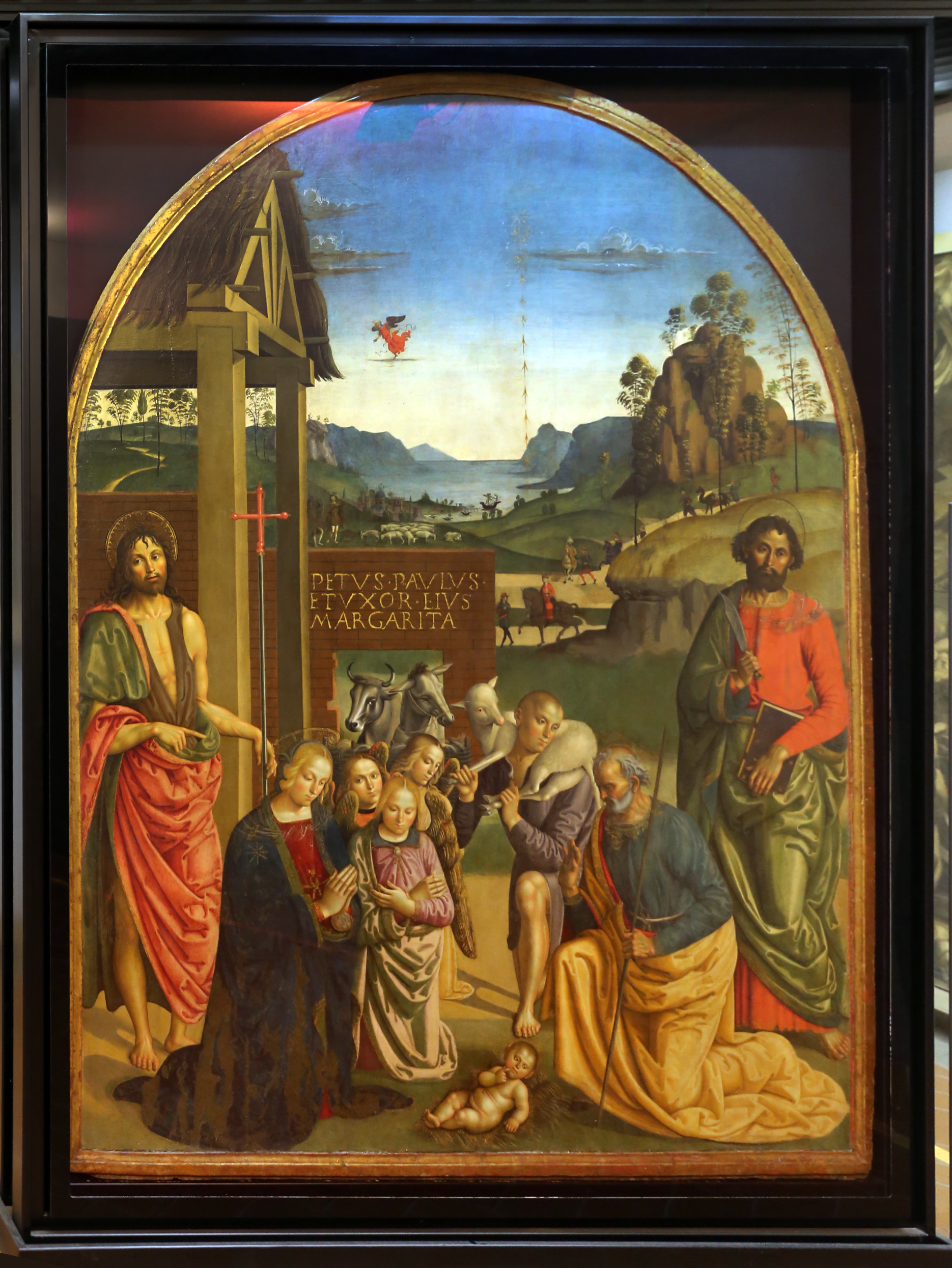
Nativity by Il Pastura

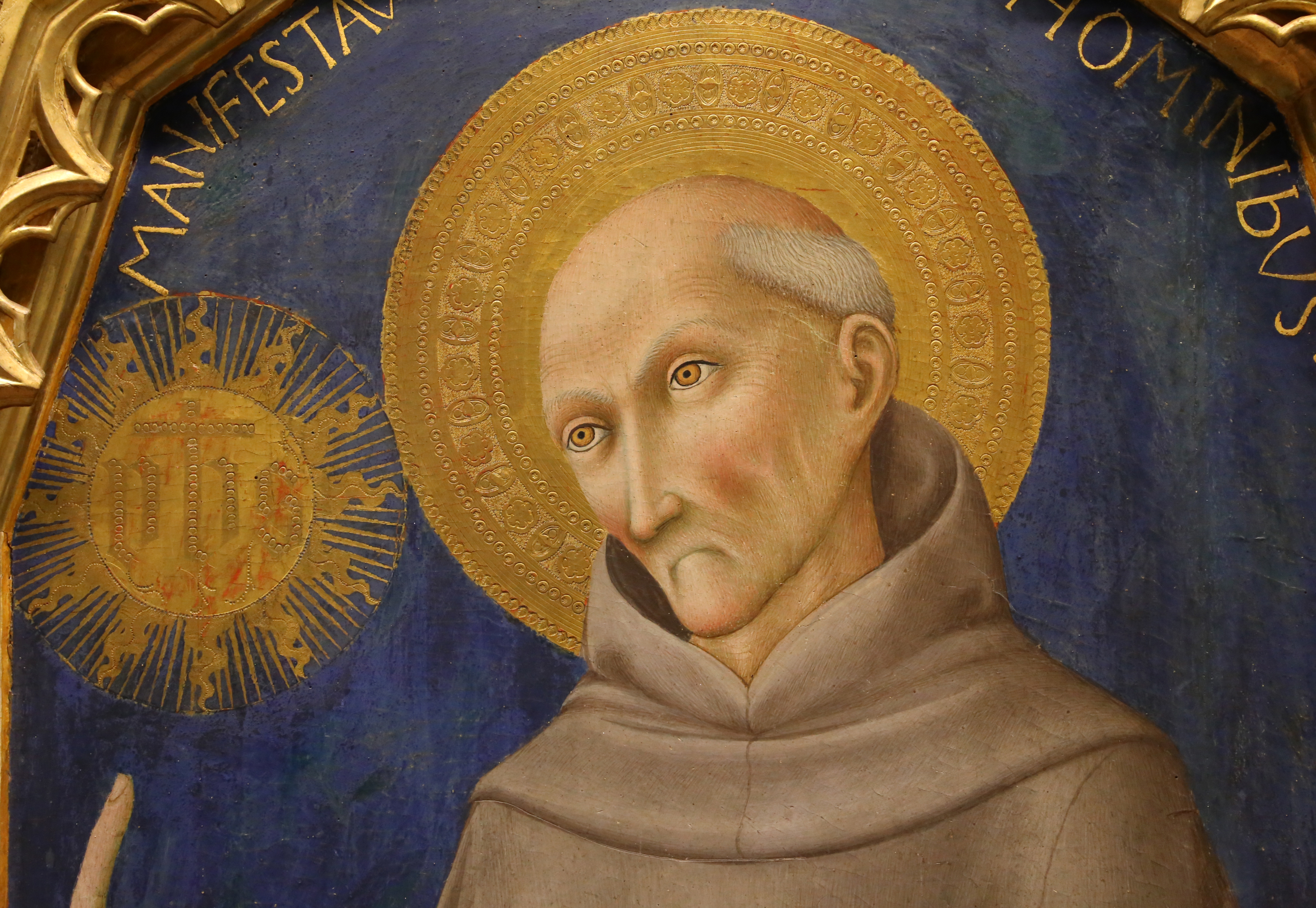
St Bernardino by Sano di Pietro

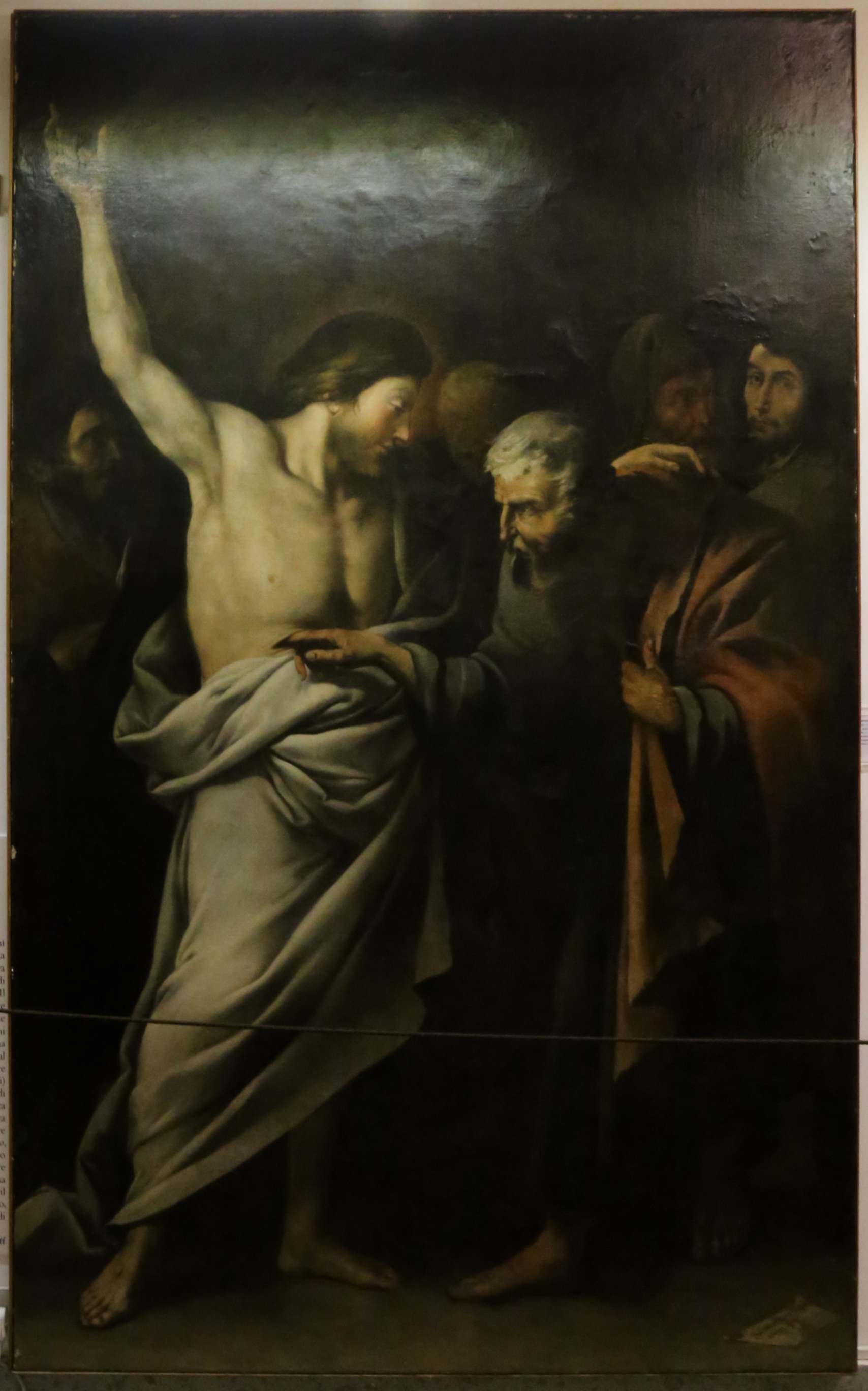
Incredulity of St Thomas by Salvatore Rosa

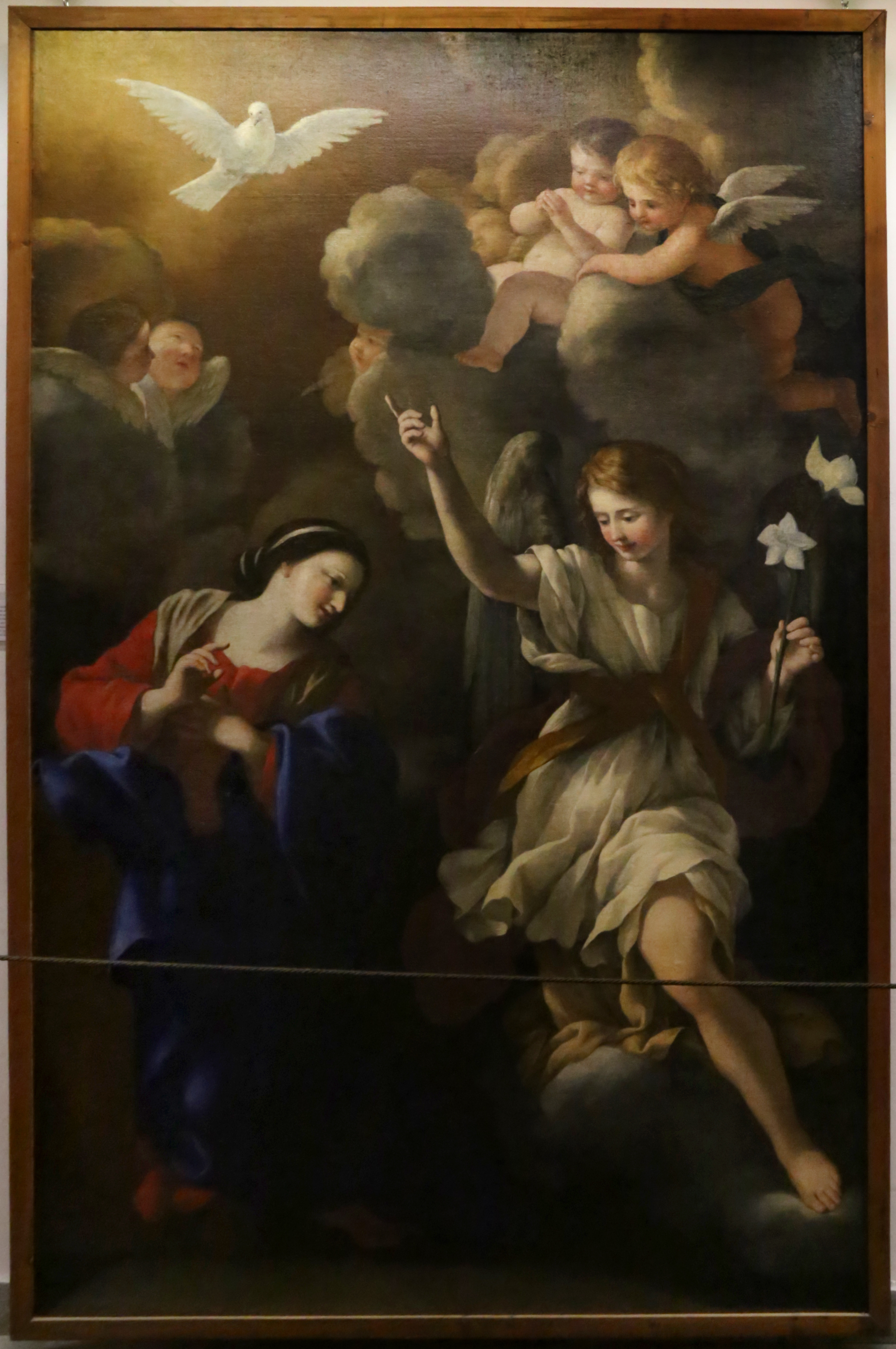
Annunciation by GR Romanelli, originally in Santi Teresa e Giuseppe

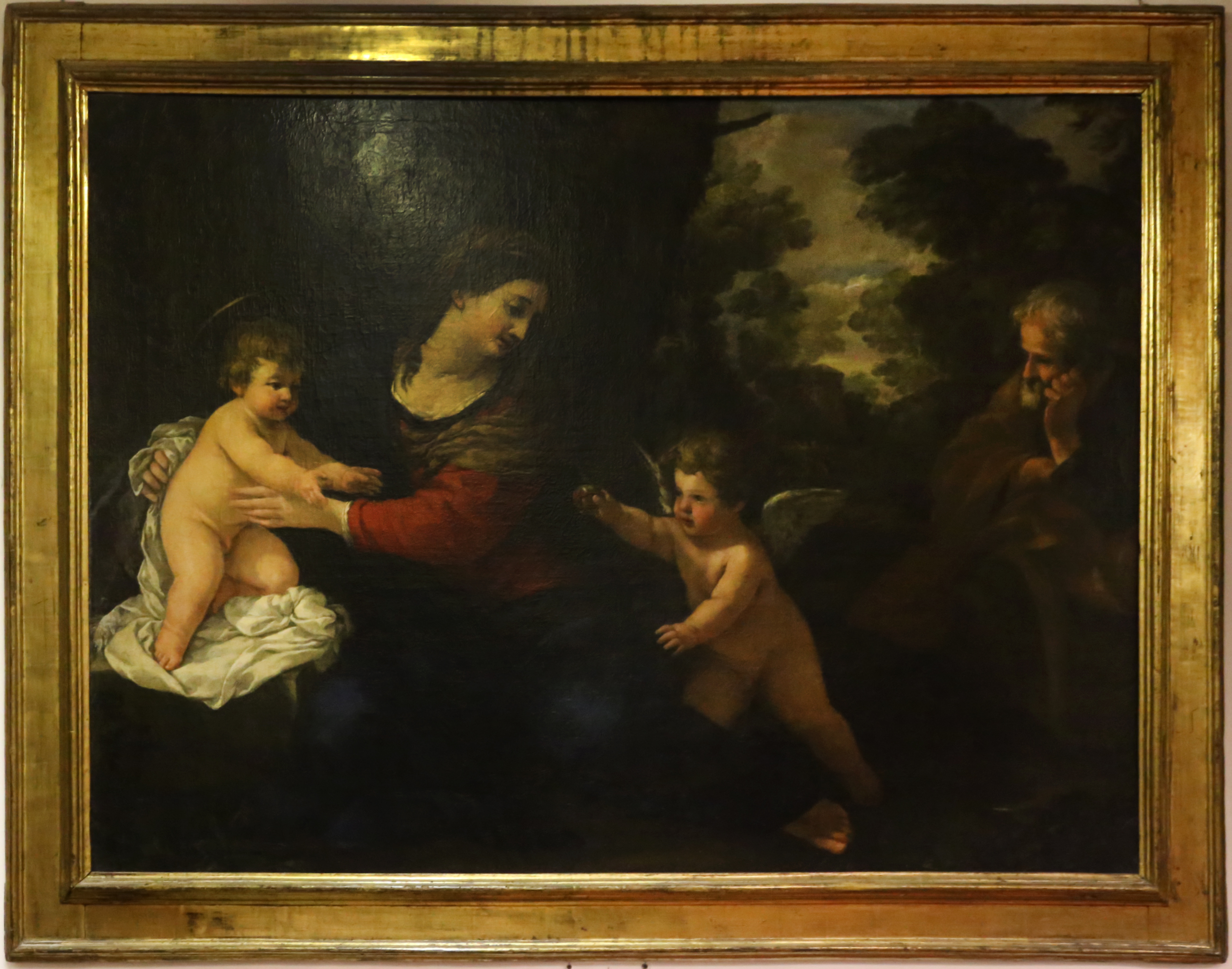
Repose in Egypt by GF Romanelli

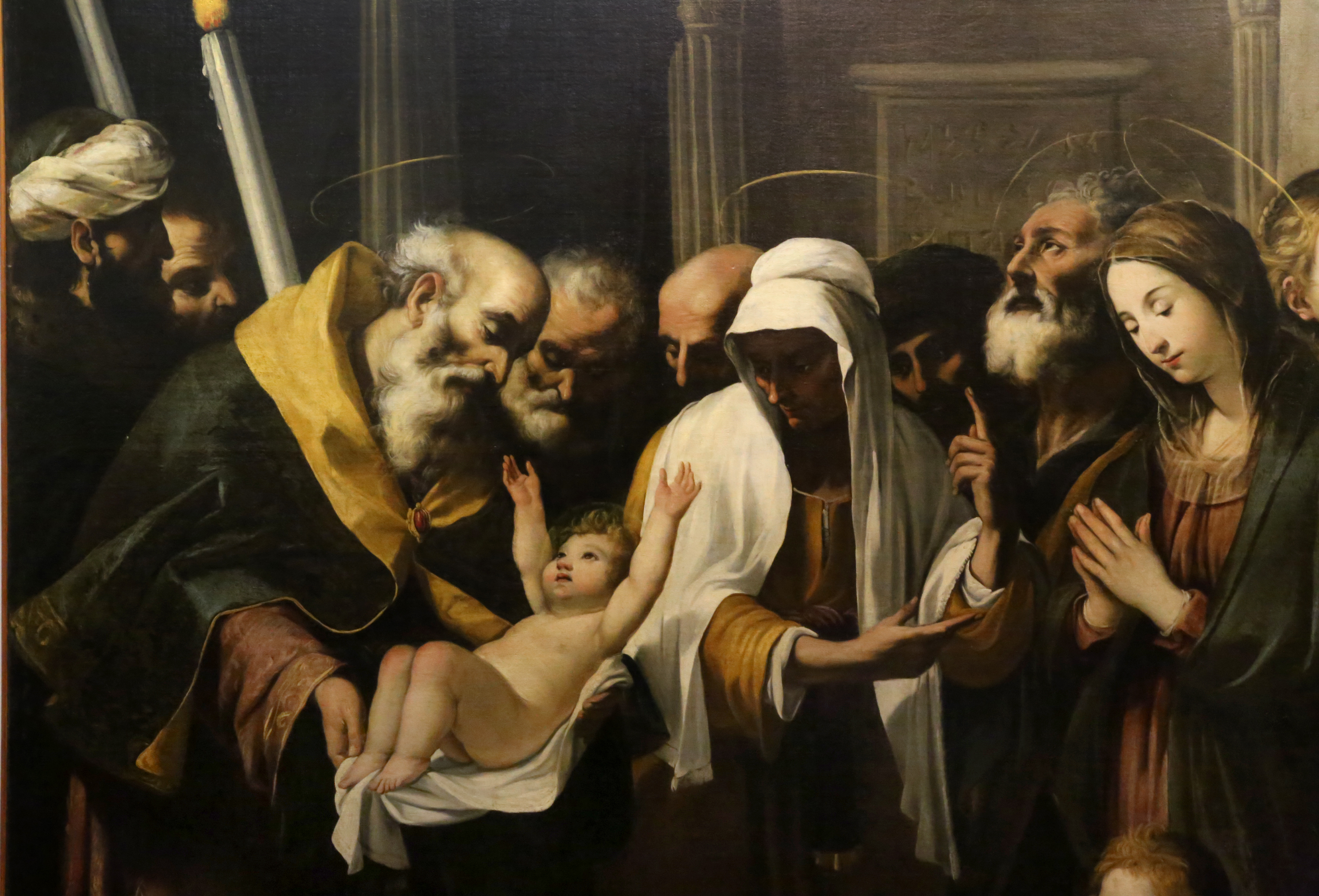
Presentation of Jesus at the Temple by A. Grammatica

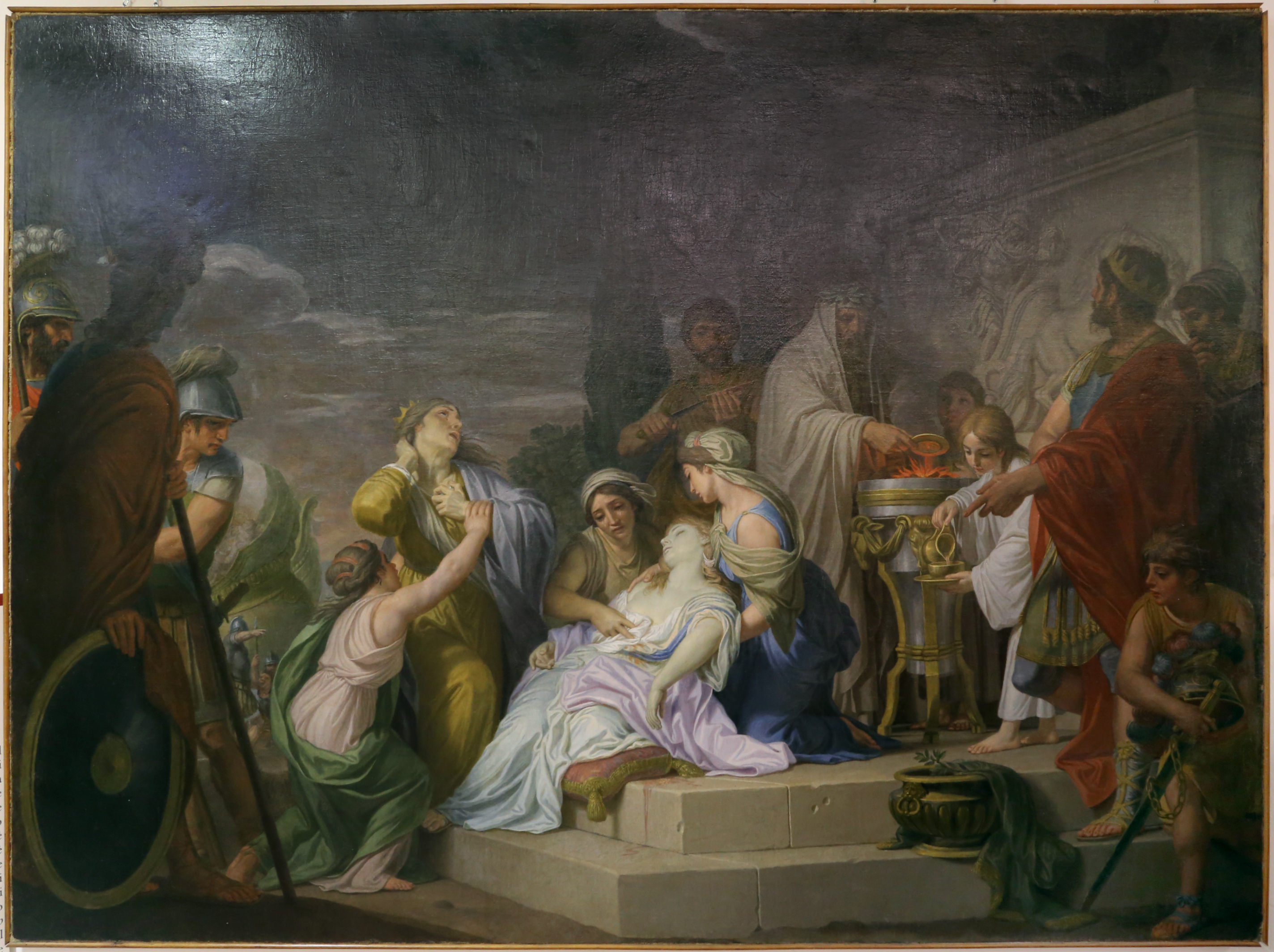
Sacrifice of Polyxena by Domenico Corvi
