= Musarna =

- Location within Lazio
- 42°24′43.9848″N 11°58′35.673″E
- Type: Settlement
- Cultures: Etruscan
- Location: Comune di Viterbo, Italy
- Region: Lazio

Site notes
- Excavation dates: 1983-present
- Archaeologists: Henri Broise; Vincent Jolivet
- Condition: ruined
- Public access: no

Musarna is an Etruscan settlement located approximately 10 km west of Viterbo, Italy. The site was discovered in 1849 and has been the site of excavations carried out by the École française de Rome since 1983.

During the Hellenistic period the settlement was surrounded by a fortification wall.

The third century BC stone sarcophagus of Larth Thvetlie, son of Arnth, is housed in the University of Pennsylvania Museum of Archaeology and Anthropology.

== Sources ==
- Andreau, Jean, H. Broise, V. Jolivet et al. ed. 2002–present. Musarna. [series]. Rome: École française de Rome.;
- de Cazanove, O., V. Jolivet. 1984. "Musarna (Viterbe). La cité étrusque" MEFRA 96:530-4.
