= Santa Maria della Verità, Viterbo =

Church in Lazio, Italy

Coordinates: 42.41718°N 12.11067°E

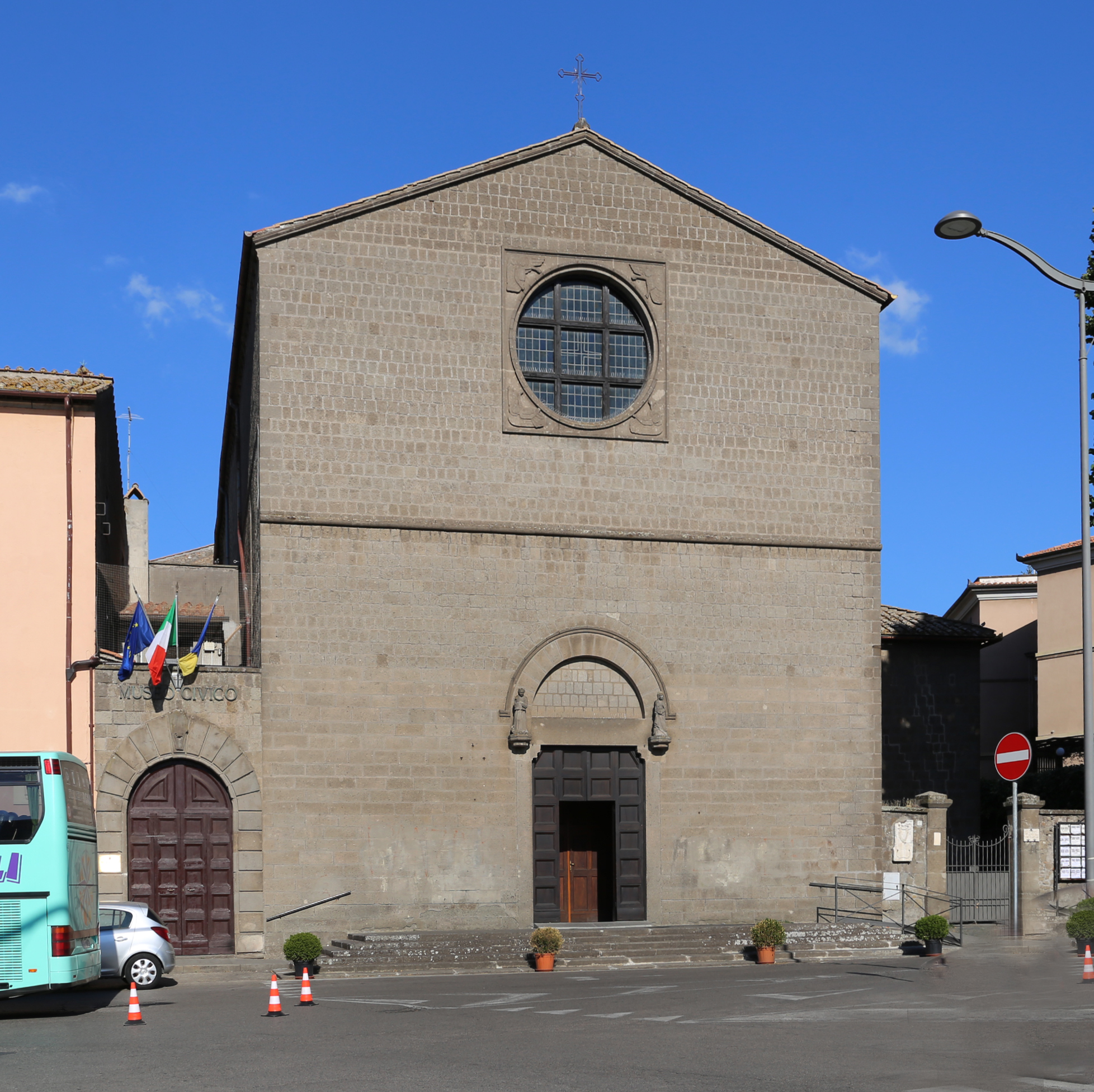
Facade of church

Santa Maria della Verità (Saint Mary of the Truth) is a Roman Catholic church in Viterbo, region of Lazio, Italy. Formerly a monastic church and sanctuary, the adjacent convent has now been converted into the Civic Museum while the church is now a parish church.

== History and description ==
Putatively, the church was originally dedicated to St Macarius, but the first documentation available is that of a church founded in the 13th century by monks of the Premonstratensian order. But this convent was vacated by 1231 and assigned to priest of the Order of the Servi di Maria (Servite Order) who rededicated it to Santa Maria della Verità.

In the mid-14th century, the apse was enlarged under the patronage of the Bussi family. In 1446, three children reported a miraculous apparition of the Virgin Mary inside the church. The church now became a sanctuary and gained pilgrims and donations. Also associated with this church was blessed Pietro della Croce. His story is obscure, putatively a 36-year-old German pilgrim, on his way to Rome, fell ill while hosted by the Servites, and facing death, asked to enter the monastic order before expiring in 1522. His relics however were exiled in 1875 from this church, after the expulsion of the Servites. They have migrated around town, and now are in the Seminary of Viterbo. He appears to have been linked to prayers for cures from Tertian Fever (malarial illness). His canonization was never completed.

In 1867, the Servite monks were expelled and by 1873, the convent was expropriated. In 1912, the church hosted the museum of the mainly Etruscan archaeological objects which had till then been exhibited Palazzo dei Priori since 1888. For a time, the convent also housed the Royal Technical institute. In January 1944, an allied bombardment of Viterbo, severely damaged the building. In September 1955, the museum was re-opened but in the convent. In 1961, the church was reconsecrated.

The facade of the church has a rounded arch over the portal, surmounted by an oculus window. The choir of the adjacent cloister sports delicate gothic tracery.

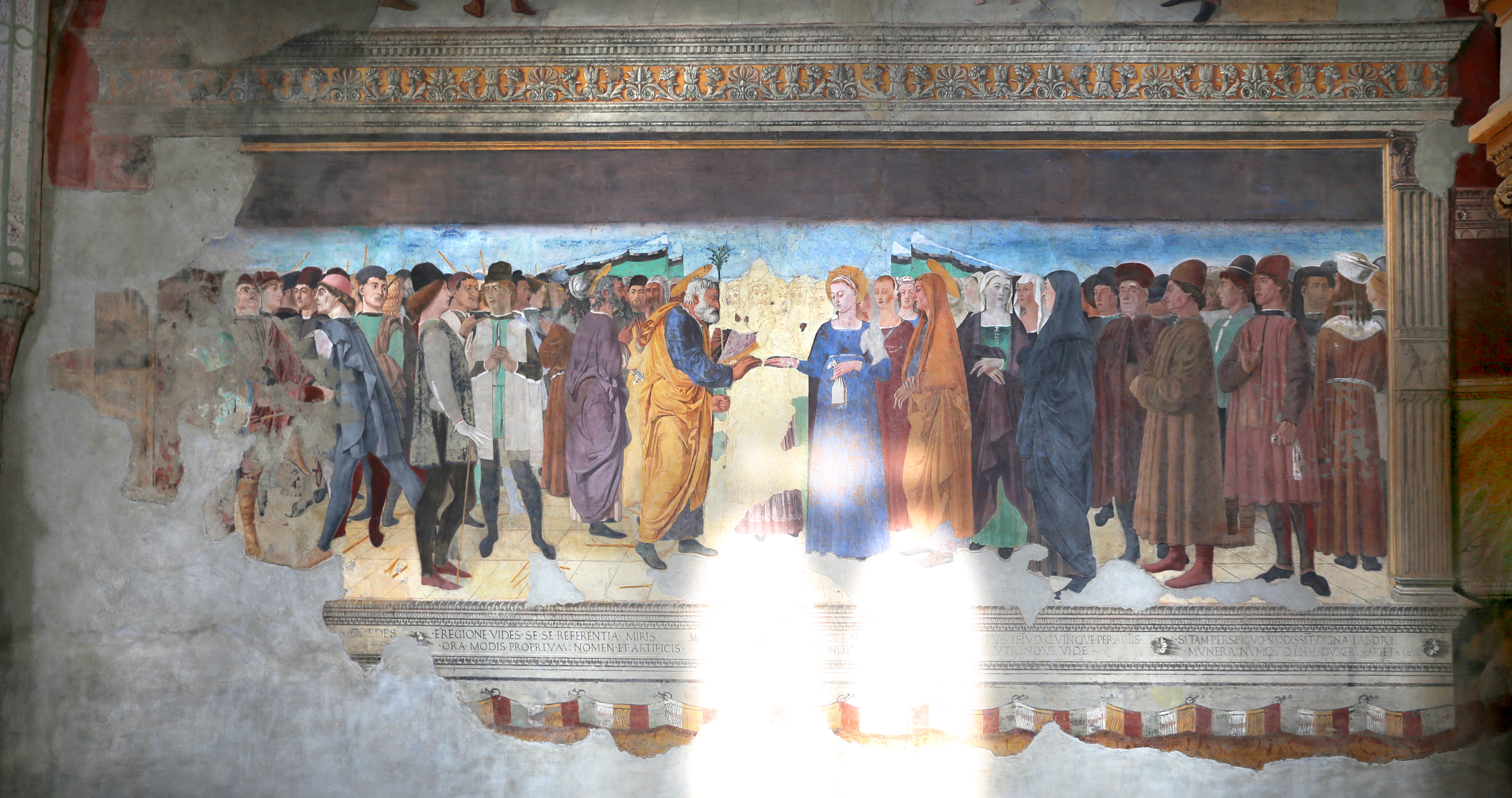
Fresco of Marriage of the Virgin by Lorenzo da Viterbo

The church has a Latin-cross layout, set by the refurbishments in the 15th and 16th-centuries. The tall nave recalls Gothic construction, its walls are mainly stripped of decoration. The side chapels retain some of the original fresco decoration. On the right counter-facade is a heavily damaged 15th century fresco depicting the Annunciation between Saints Mary Magdalene Martha and Antony, attributed to il Balletta. The original altarpiece for the first chapel on the right was formerly a Nativity painted by il Pastura and now in the adjacent Civic Museum. The second chapel, the 15th-century Mazzatosta chapel still has its original wrought iron railing and a part of its 15th-century majolica tile floor by Paolo di Nicola. The frescoes depicting the Life of the Virgin, heavily restored after the allied bombing, were painted by Lorenzo da Viterbo and his pupils in 1469. Of note, is the fresco depicting the Marriage of the Virgin, which includes a crowd of contemporary citizens of Viterbo. Next is the chapel "of the Germans" or Theutonicorum, later transferred to the Corsican corporation of the linen weavers and dedicated to Saints Giacomo and Filippo Benizi (founder of the Servite Order). The altarpiece of this chapel, depicting the Mystical Marriage of St Catherine was painted by Pancrazio Jacovetti and is now found in the Civic Museum.

The organ in the right transept was installed in 1986. The chapel at the end of the right transept (dedicated to St Sebastian) belonged to the Spreca family. They commissioned a Madonna with Child (1591). A canvas depicting a late-17th-century Immaculate Conception is attributed to Ludovico Mazzanti.

In the left-hand transept ending in a 15th-century rounded arch, before the sacristy, we can see the remains of some frescoes from the 16th century. In the right transept are chapels commissioned by various guilds.
