= Ugolino and His Sons (Rodin) =

Sculpture by Auguste Rodin

Ugolino and his sons
- Ugolin et ses enfants (French)
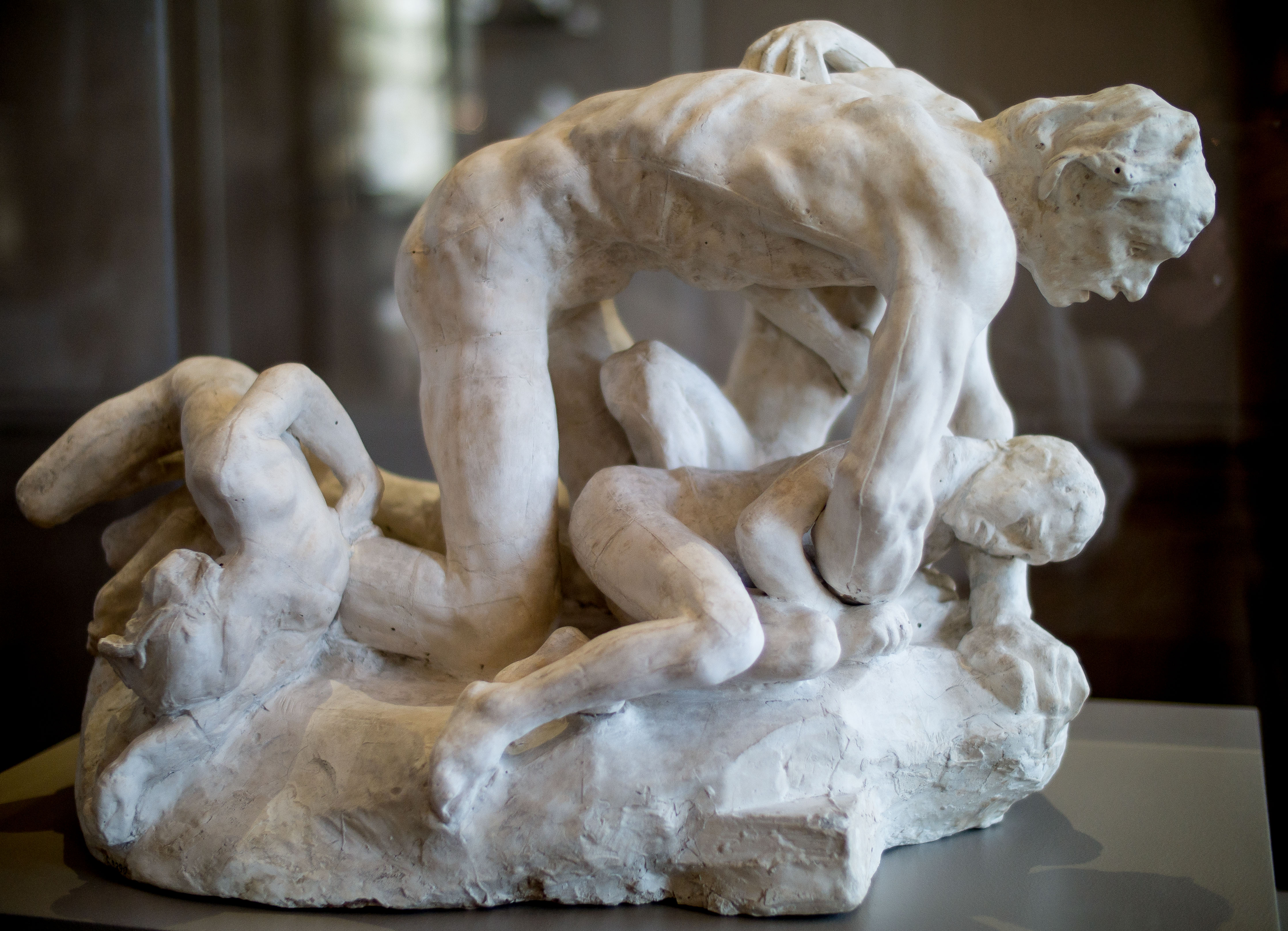
- Sculpture (plaster), Musée Rodin
- Artist: Auguste Rodin
- Year: 1881
- Completion date: 1882
- Type: sculpture
- Medium: plaster
- Subject: Ugolino della Gherardesca
- Dimensions: 46.5 cm × 38.5 cm × 44.2 cm (18.3 in × 15.2 in × 17.4 in)
- Location: Musée Rodin; Paris

Ugolino and his sons is a plaster sculpture by French artist Auguste Rodin, part of the sculptural group known as The Gates of Hell. As an independent piece, it was exhibited by its author in Brussels (1887), Edinburgh (1893), Genoa (1896), Florence (1897), Netherlands (1899) and in his own retrospective in 1900.

== Theme ==
Ugolino della Gherardesca was an aristocrat and politician who lived in Pisa during the 13th century. After five years of government in his natal city, he was tried for betrayal and arrested along with his children and grandchildren. They were incarcerated at the Muda Tower, where they died of starvation nine months later.

Dante Alighieri wrote the story of Ugolino in his Divine Comedy, where the aristocrat is placed in the deepest circle of Hell. He is the one who explains to Dante how the prisoners were slowly dying and his own sons begged him to eat them after their deaths. This story is the reason why Ugolino is known as "The Cannibal Count" and is often represented as eating his own fingers.

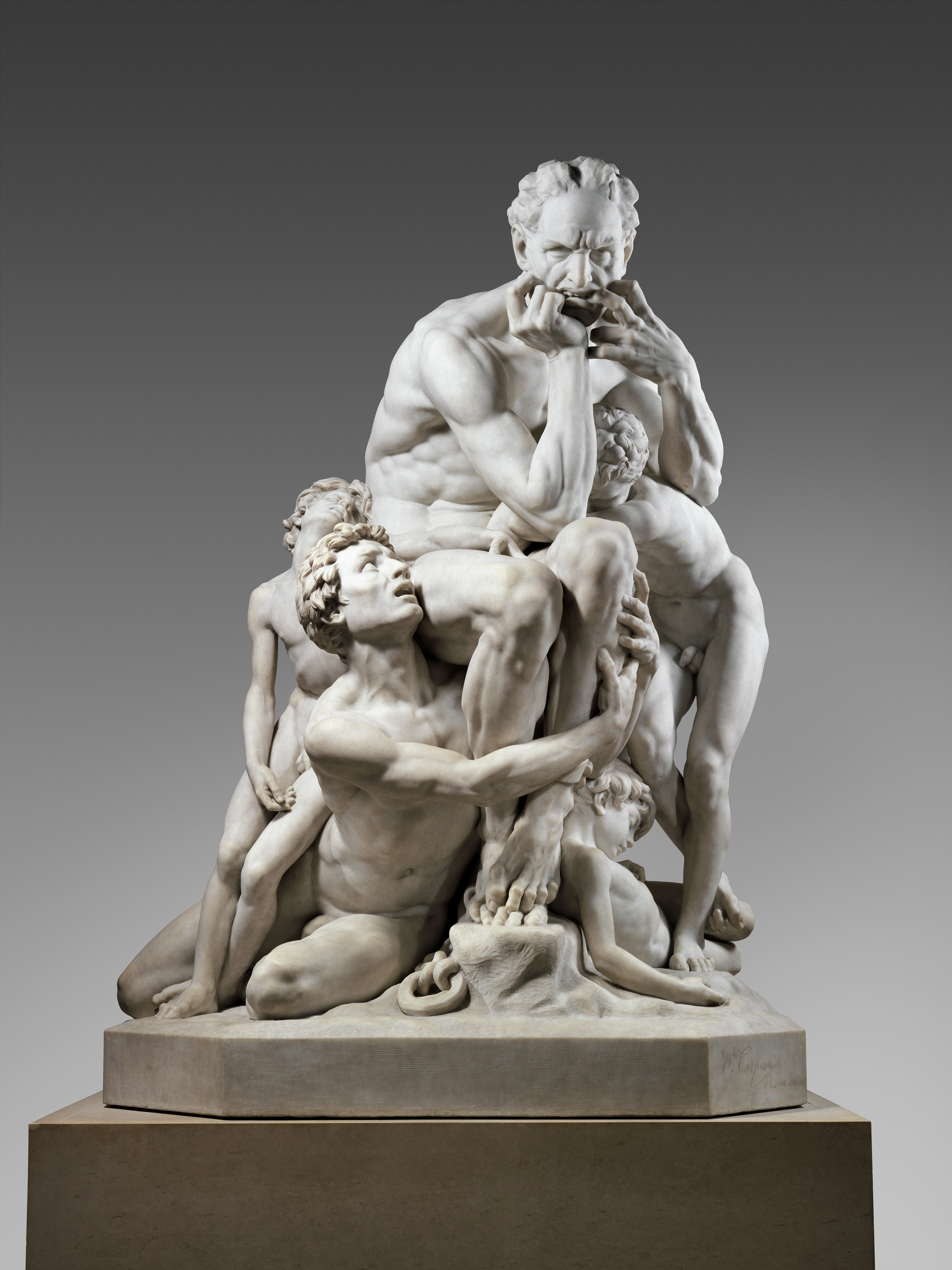
Ugolino and his sons, Jean-Baptiste Carpeaux, Metropolitan Museum of Art

== Background and conception ==
Jean-Baptiste Carpeaux, a 19th-century French sculptor, started a project about Ugolino and his Sons for the French Academy of Fine Arts. This was an independent piece to be delivered to the French Government after winning a scholarship for travelling to Rome to study at Villa Medici. For several years, he worked on a sculpture that transmitted agony, fury and desperation. The main character has one hand on his chin and his fingers in the mouth.

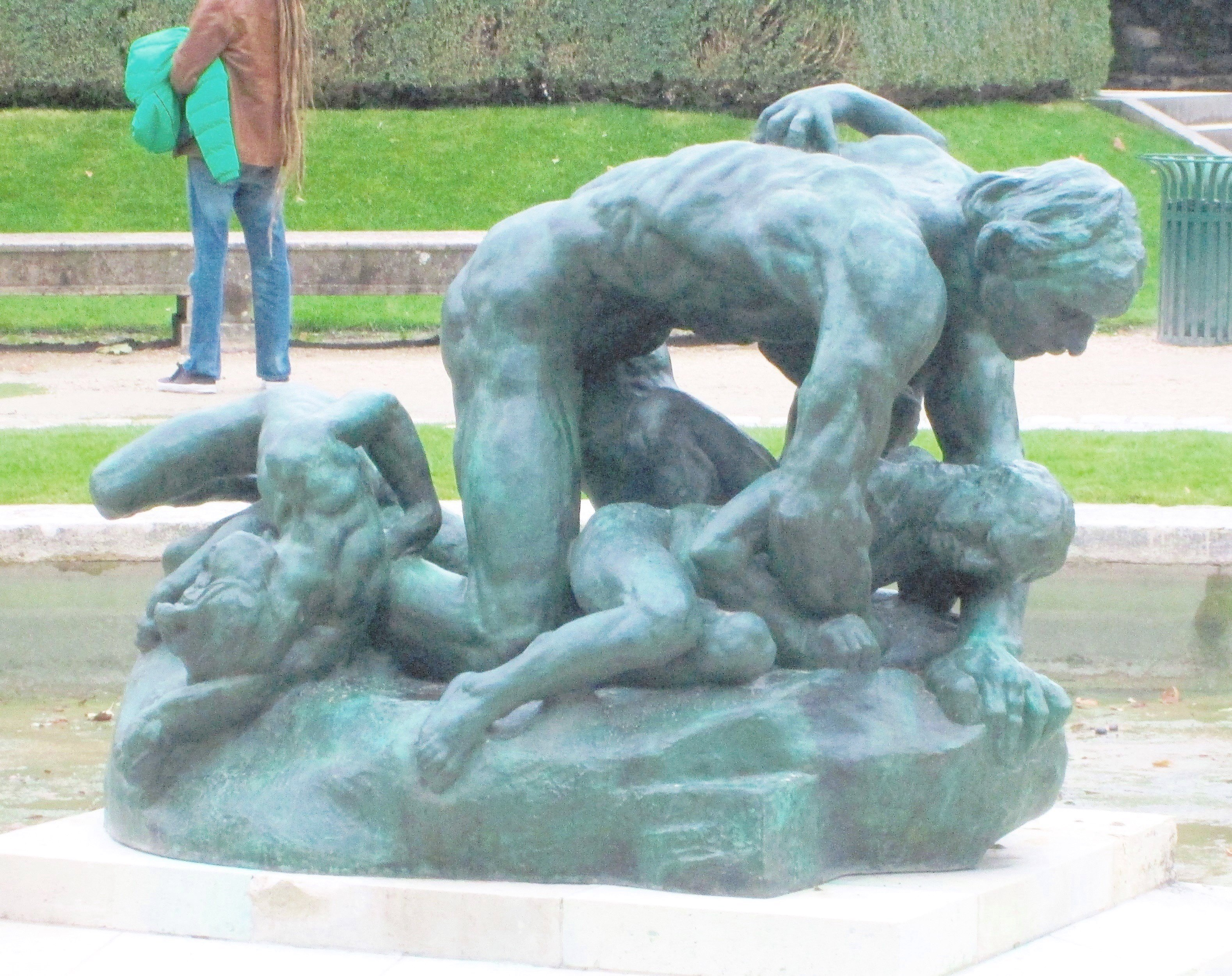
Full-scale version in the garden of the Musée Rodin in Paris, cast from a model made in 1902–09.

== Ugolino in The Gates of Hell ==
Ugolino's episode in the Divine Comedy had a great impact on Rodin. In the early models of The Gates of Hell, Ugolino's representation is already an important theme, one of the first two episodes from Dante's poem to be interpreted as sculptures. The first studies show how Rodin's first intention was to show the Count in a vertical position like Carpeaux. In his final version, however, Ugolino is shown in a horizontal position, perhaps to reinforce the inhumanity of his action. He's found on his knees, leaning to the front with a desperate gesture and an open mouth. Rodin made his piece distinct from Carpeaux's and so achieved a unique artwork with strong dramatic tones. The sculpture was enlarged by Henri Lebossé between 1901 and 1904. This version presents several differences with the small model. Even though the French government asked for a bronze cast, this was only done after the artist's death and is found today (2016) at the gardens of Musée Rodin at the south side of the Hôtel Biron.

In The Gates of Hell, Ugolino's group is found on the lower half of the left door in such a way that it's not possible to observe the fourth child next to Ugolino's right leg. (Note: Elsen: To achieve the angle and depth he wanted when he inserted the group into the left door, Rodin omitted the fourth child, who lies across the father's right leg) This is considered one of several examples of The Gates not having a single, unique perspective to be viewed from. (Note: Elsen:...indicating that Rodin had no fixed viewpoint from which to see the figures when he was working on them for the portal.)

== See also ==
- List of sculptures by Auguste Rodin
