= Ruggieri degli Ubaldini =

Italian archbishop (died 1295)

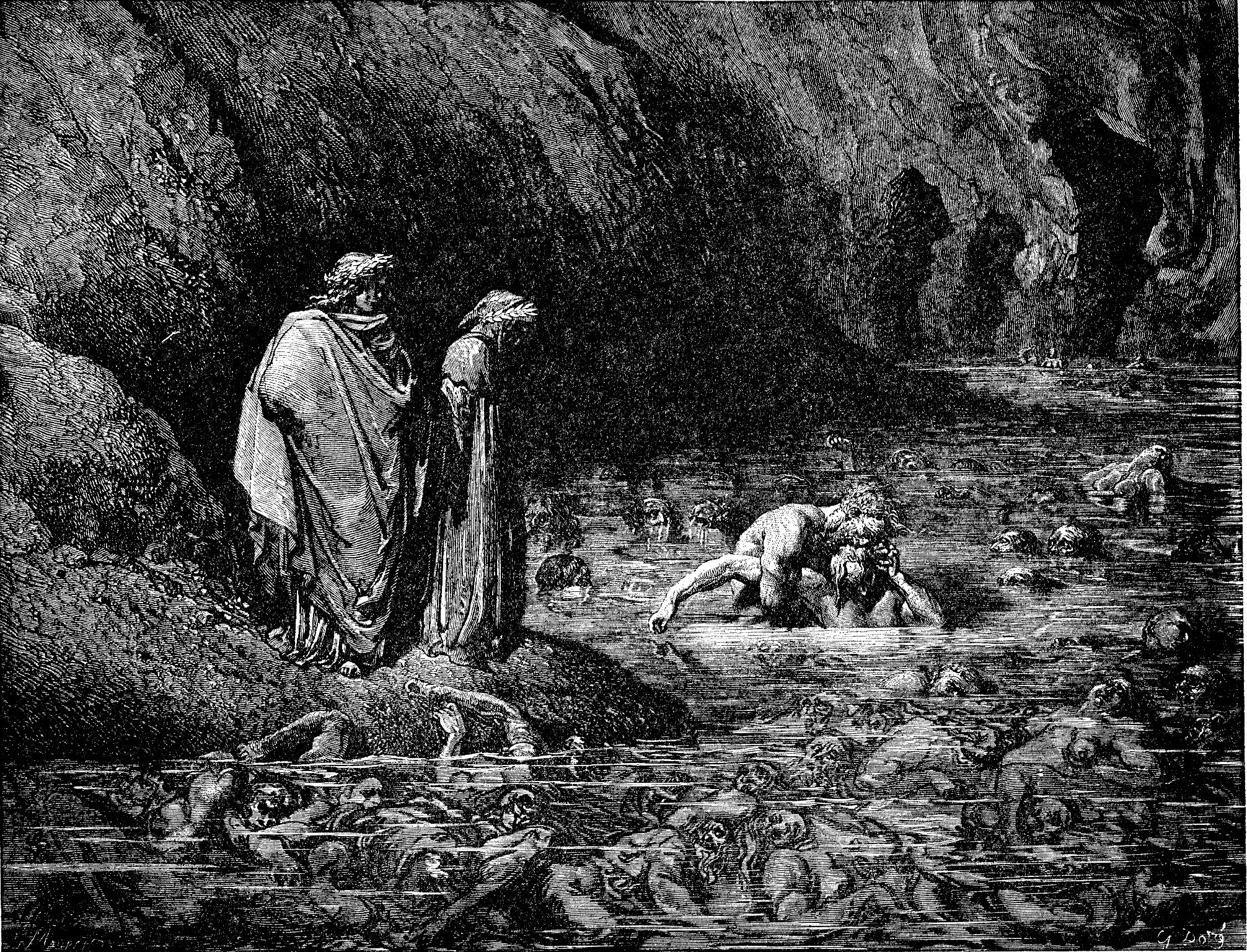
Ugolino biting archbishop Ruggieri, illustrated by Gustave Doré

Ruggieri degli Ubaldini (fl. 1271 – 15 September 1295, Viterbo) was an Italian archbishop.

== Life ==
Born in Mugello to the powerful family of the counts of Pila, Ruggieri was the son of Ubaldino and the nephew of cardinal Ottaviano degli Ubaldini. He began his clerical career in the archepiscopal curia of the archdiocese of Bologna, then in 1271 the Ghibelline (in general, partisans of the Holy Roman Empire) inhabitants of Ravenna made him archbishop of Ravenna-Cervia, in rivalry to another prelate appointed by the Guelphs (partisans of the papacy). The conflicts between them convinced the pope to exclude them both from the office. In 1278 he became archbishop of Pisa, a city then governed by the Guelphs Ugolino della Gherardesca and Nino Visconti.

Ruggieri initially tried to settle the conflict between Guelphs and Ghibellines in favor of the latter, but soon (posing as Nino's friend) played them off against each other in an attempt to finish off them both. He led the revolt which finally deposed count Ugolino and the Gualandi, Sismondi and Lanfranchi families. According to contemporary chroniclers, followed by Dante, he captured Ugolino by deception - it is definite that he imprisoned him, his two sons and his two grandsons in the Torre della Muda, where they died. Probably for this reason, or for betraying the Visconti, Dante places Ruggieri in the lowest circle of hell. Even Pope Nicholas IV rebuked Ruggieri for his behavior and sent him a condemnation of his treatment of Ugolino and the Guelphs, but the pope's death prevented him acting on these and saved Ruggieri from punishment.

After Ugolino's death in 1289, Ruggieri had himself nominated as podestà of Pisa, but was unable to sustain the conflict with the Visconti and had to forfeit the office. He continued to live in his archdiocese, retaining the title until his death in 1295 in Viterbo, where he had recently moved. His tomb was once in the cloister of the monastery attached to the church of Santa Maria in Gradi, Viterbo (now the headquarters of the Tuscia University), but is now lost.

== Ruggieri in Dante ==
Ruggieri appears in canto XXXIII of Dante's Inferno, in the second band of the ninth circle, in Antenora, where traitors are punished. Dante portrays Ugolino gnawing at Ruggieri's skull for all eternity—his punishment for sentencing four innocents to die alongside the guilty. Although Ugolino makes a long speech, Ruggieri says nothing.

== Bibliography ==
- Giovan Battista Ubaldini, Istoria della casa degli Ubaldini e de' fatti d'alcuni di quella famiglia, Firenze, Sermartelli, 1588.
- Antonio Munoz, Roma di Dante, Milano-Roma, Bestetti e Tumminelli, 1921.
- Vittorio Sermonti, Inferno, Rizzoli 2001.
- Umberto Bosco and Giovanni Reggio, La Divina Commedia - Inferno, Le Monnier 1988.
