= Walls of Viterbo =

Medieval structure in Italy

The Walls of Viterbo, in Viterbo, Italy, developed over centuries, but much of these circumscribing, defensive medieval structures still exists, and their entrance gates, often modernized, still limit the access at certain sites.

== History ==
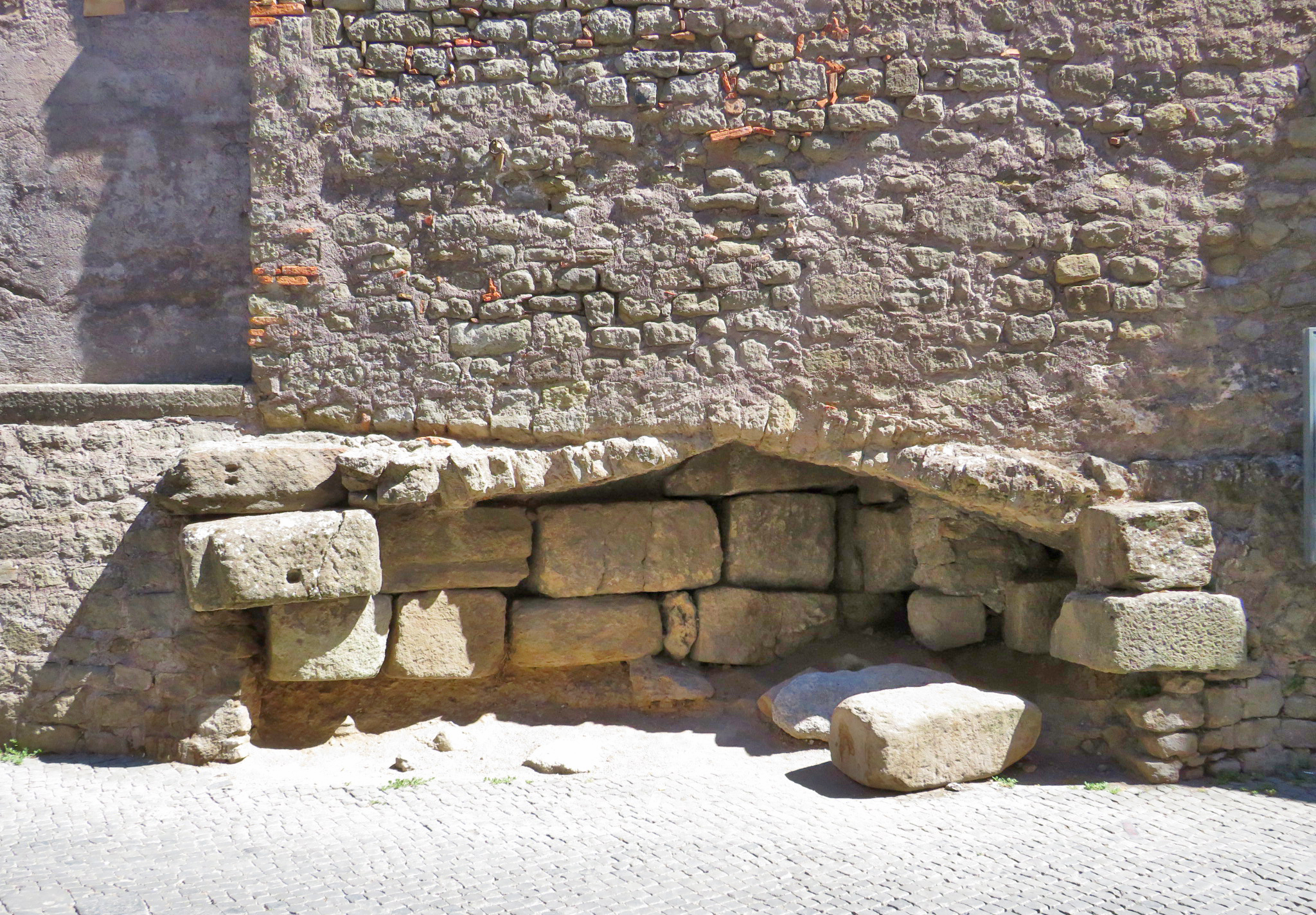
Ancient Etruscan wall

While it is expected that the Ancient Etruscan or Roman town at this site also had defensive walls, this has not been conclusively determined. Some stone blocks near the Palazzo Farnese near the town center are assigned to an ancient construction, perhaps a wall. The main walls seen now were erected during the turbulent 11th and 13th centuries to encompass three hills, provided room for urban expansion. The era of its construction was beset by both internecine Guelphs and Ghibellines warfare, as well as foreign army sieges.

In Cesare Pinzi's 1911 guide to the principal monuments of Viterbo, he states a timeline:

- Prior to 11th century: walls or moats, if present, enclosed only the city center around the Duomo
- 1095: Wall erected from Porta Fiorita to Porta di San Sisto and San Matteo dell'Abbate (now Verità), and the hill of Santa Rosa, to the Porta di Sonza.
- 1148: Piano Scarano enclosed and walls from Porta Fiorita to Porta Valle near Faulle built
- 1210: Walls built to enclose hill around San Francesco, and the monastery of Santa Rosa
- 1215: Walls from the tower under San Lupara to Porta di Bove and from there to tower of Santa Maria della Ginestra.
- 1246: Wall from the Monastery of Sant'Agostino to the Porta of Santa Maria Maddalena
- 1268: Wall from tower of Santa Maria della Ginestra under Porta Bove, up to the tower opposite San Clemente.

The walls are punctured by a number of gates, including now remaining:

- Porta Romana
- Porta Fiorentina
- Porta Faul
- Porta del Carmine
- Porta San Pietro
- Porta della Verità

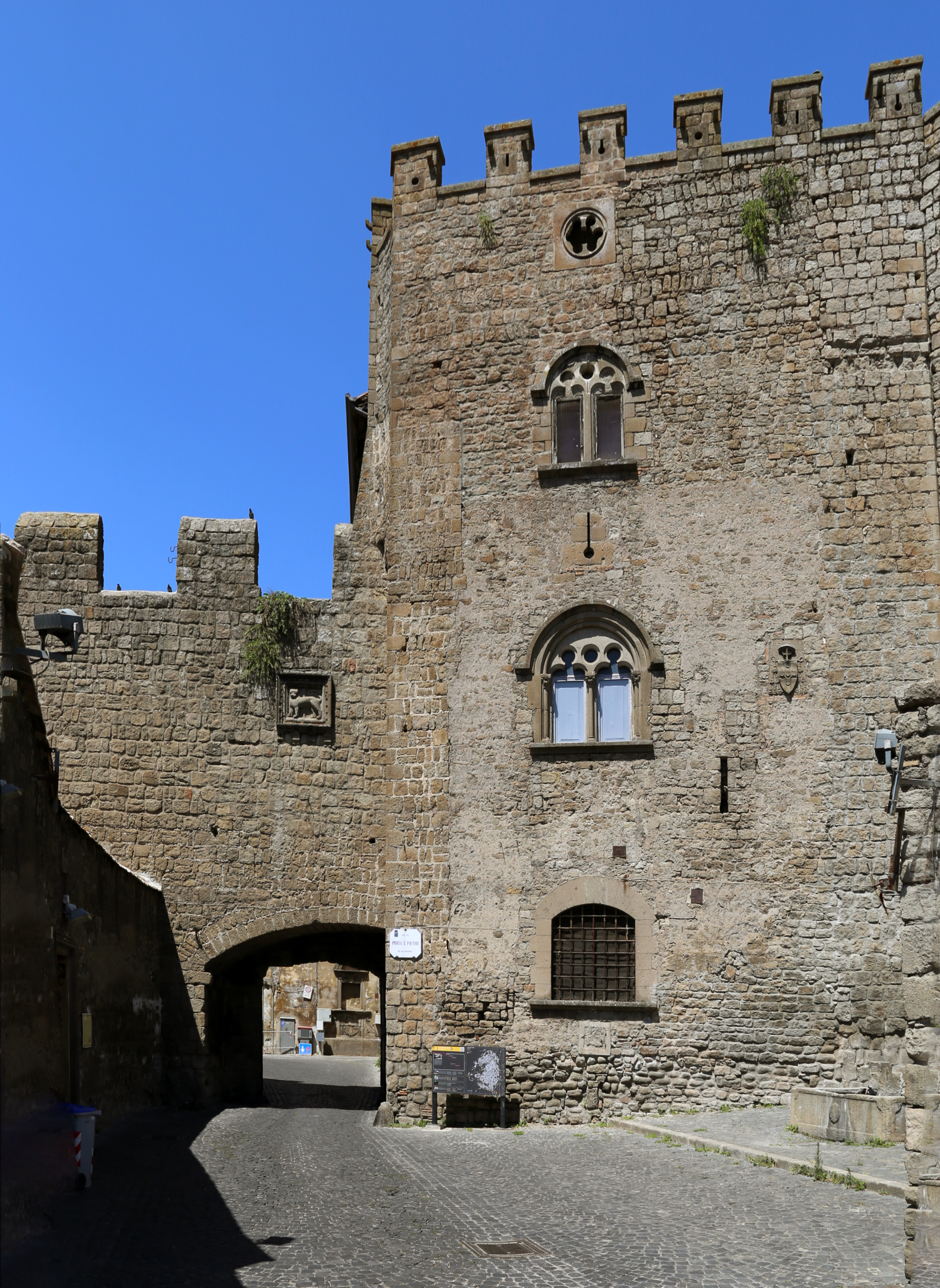
Porta San Pietro
