= Michele Zizza =

Michele Zizza is an Italian journalist, communications professional and academic whose work focuses on strategic communication, institutional communication, disinformation and digital media. He has held communications roles within Italian public institutions, including the Carabinieri, the Ministry of Defence and the Presidency of the Senate. His academic research examines strategic narratives, information influence operations and the relationship between digital platforms and public communication.

== Career ==
Zizza is a registered journalist and has held positions in governmental and parliamentary communications. From 2016 to 2018 he worked in the press office of the Carabinieri General Command, handling its social networks and institutional websites. By late 2018 he was managing the online communication strategy for the Italian Minister of Defence, and in November 2019 he became a press officer to the President of the Italian Senate. In September 2025 he was appointed head of communications at DEAS – Difesa e Analisi Sistemi, a company which works on the security of critical infrastructure.

He has appeared as a commentator on Italian television, including on La7's L'aria che tira in April 2022, where he discussed Russian propaganda during the war in Ukraine.

In December 2021 he was made a Cavaliere of the Order of Merit of the Italian Republic.

== Academic work ==
Zizza holds a PhD in communication from the Sapienza University of Rome. His thesis concerned a protocol for public administrations on user-generated content and a technology for countering fake news.

He is a contract lecturer (docente a contratto) at the University of Tuscia in Viterbo, where he has taught digital cultures and social media, and he coordinates the university's first-level master's programme in Strategic Communication.

== Publications ==
Zizza has written or co-written four books and co-edited a fifth:

- (with A. D’Errico) Figli virtuali: Percorso educativo alla tutela e alla complicità nella famiglia digitale (Erickson, 2018)
- La comunicazione digitale nell'Ufficio stampa del Quirinale e della Presidenza della Repubblica Italiana (Aracne, 2020)
- Introduzione alla comunicazione strategica applicata agli studi geopolitici (Aracne, 2022)
- Digitalizzazione, disinformazione, destabilizzazione (Editoriale Scientifica, 2025)
- (ed., with Luigi Caramiello) Potere cognitivo. Analisi e modelli a confronto nei conflitti ibridi (Editoriale Scientifica, 2026)

He has also published articles and book chapters. In 2024 he co-authored an article with Livio Calabresi in Comunicazione politica on narratives and counter-narratives in strategic communication beyond traditional media. In 2025 he contributed to a book on information ecosystems and digital literacy in sub-Saharan Africa (in a volume on hybrid threats to national security).
