= Santa Maria in Gradi, Viterbo =

Roman Catholic church in Viterbo, Lazio, Italy

Coordinates: 42.41370°N 12.11193°E

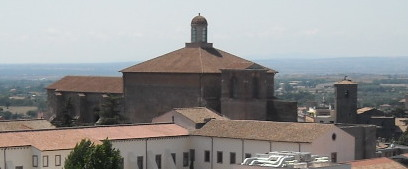
Dome of Santa Maria in Gradi

Santa Maria in Gradi is a Roman Catholic church in the town of Viterbo in the region of Lazio, Italy. The church was once part of a Dominican order monastery, but the convent is now adapted to form buildings in the Tuscia University (Università degli Studi della Tuscia). The convent stood outside of Porta Romana.

== History and description ==
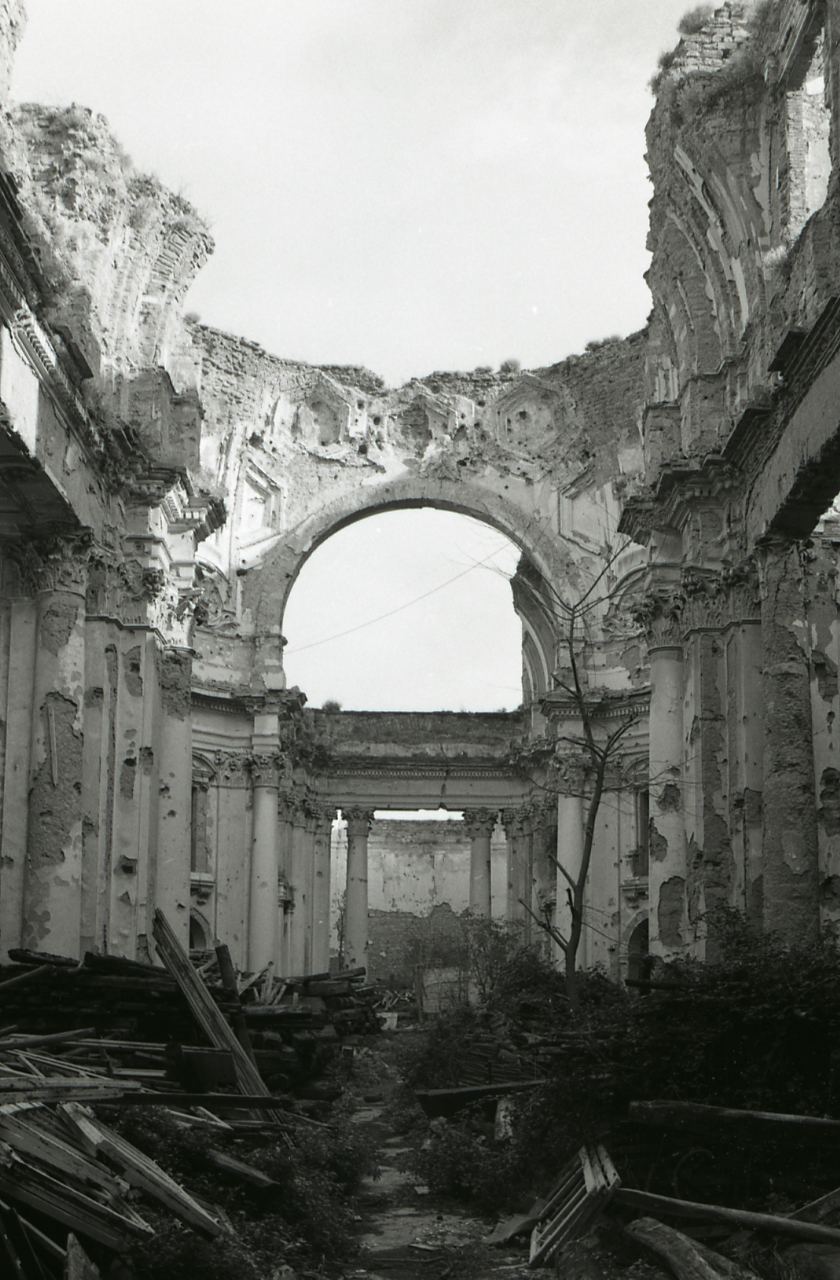
Nave and apse of church showing ruins after bombardment from 1944 and collapse of roof, photo by Paolo Monti in 1970.

The Dominican convent was founded in 1244 with the patronage of the papal notary, Raniero Capocci, who had been a friend to Dominic de Guzmán, founder of the order and beatified in 1234. The church of Santa Maria in Gradi was built over the next decades. It was consecrated in 1258 by Pope Alexander IV. The church of Santa Maria della Quercia in Viterbo also belonged to the Dominican order. But Santa Maria in Gradi, standing outside the city walls, suffered more depredations during various conflicts, and was refurbished both in the 1400s and in the 1700s. The latter work was directed by designs of Nicola Salvi. Little remains of the medieval church. It suffered from the allied bombardment in 1944, and subsequently the roof of the church collapsed in 1956. The monastery was suppressed in the 1870s, and the site had been used as a jail from 1873 to 1993. The church has undergone substantial restoration.

Among those once buried in the church was Pope Clement IV (his tomb and monument were moved in the 18th-century to San Francesco, and the archbishop Ruggieri degli Ubaldini, who Dante assigns to the circle of traitors in the Inferno.
