= Ugolino della Gherardesca =

13th-century ruler of Pisa, character in Dante's Divine Comedy

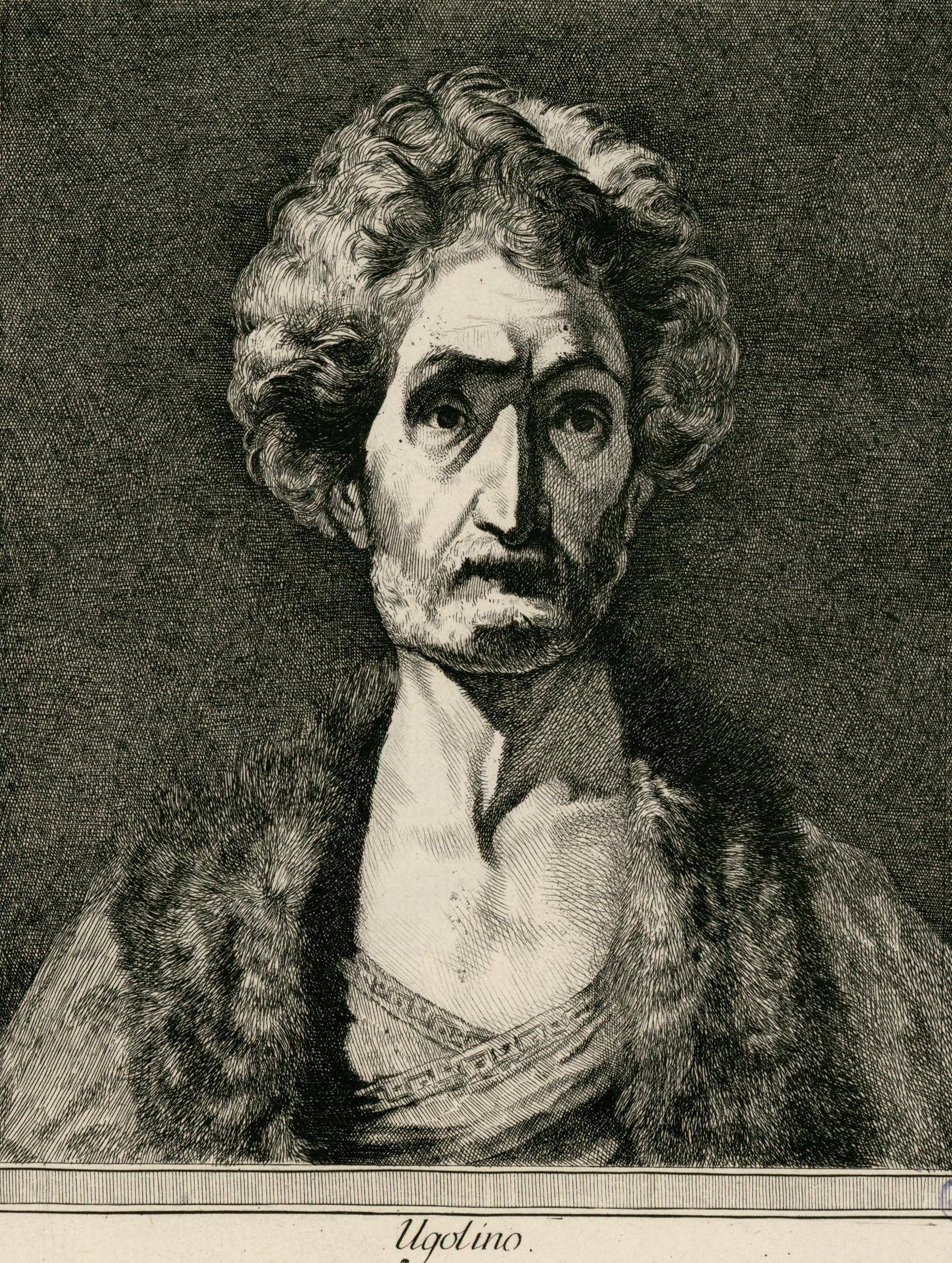
Portrait of Ugolino by Johann Kaspar Lavater

Ugolino della Gherardesca (c. 1214 – March 1289), Count of Donoratico, was an Italian nobleman, politician and naval commander. He was frequently accused of treason and features prominently in Dante's Divine Comedy.

== Biography ==
In the 13th century, the states of Italy were beset by the strife of two parties, the Ghibellines and the Guelphs. While the conflict was local and personal in origin, the parties had come to be associated with the two universal powers: the Ghibellines sided with the Holy Roman Emperor and his rule of Italy, while the Guelphs sided with the Pope, who supported self-governing city-states.

Coat of arms of the House of della Gherardesca

Pisa was controlled by the Ghibellines, while most of the surrounding cities were controlled by the Guelphs, most notably Pisa's trading rivals Genoa and Florence. Under the circumstances, Pisa adopted the "strong and vigilant government" of a podestà "armed with almost despotic power".

Ugolino was born in Pisa into the della Gherardesca family, a noble family of Germanic origins whose alliance with the Hohenstaufen emperors had brought them to prominence in Tuscany and made them the leaders of the Ghibellines in Pisa.

Between 1256 and 1258 he participated in the war against the philo-Genoese giudicato of Cagliari, in Sardinia. Ugolino then obtained the southwestern portion of the former Judicate, with its rich silver mines, where he founded the important city of Villa di Chiesa, today Iglesias.

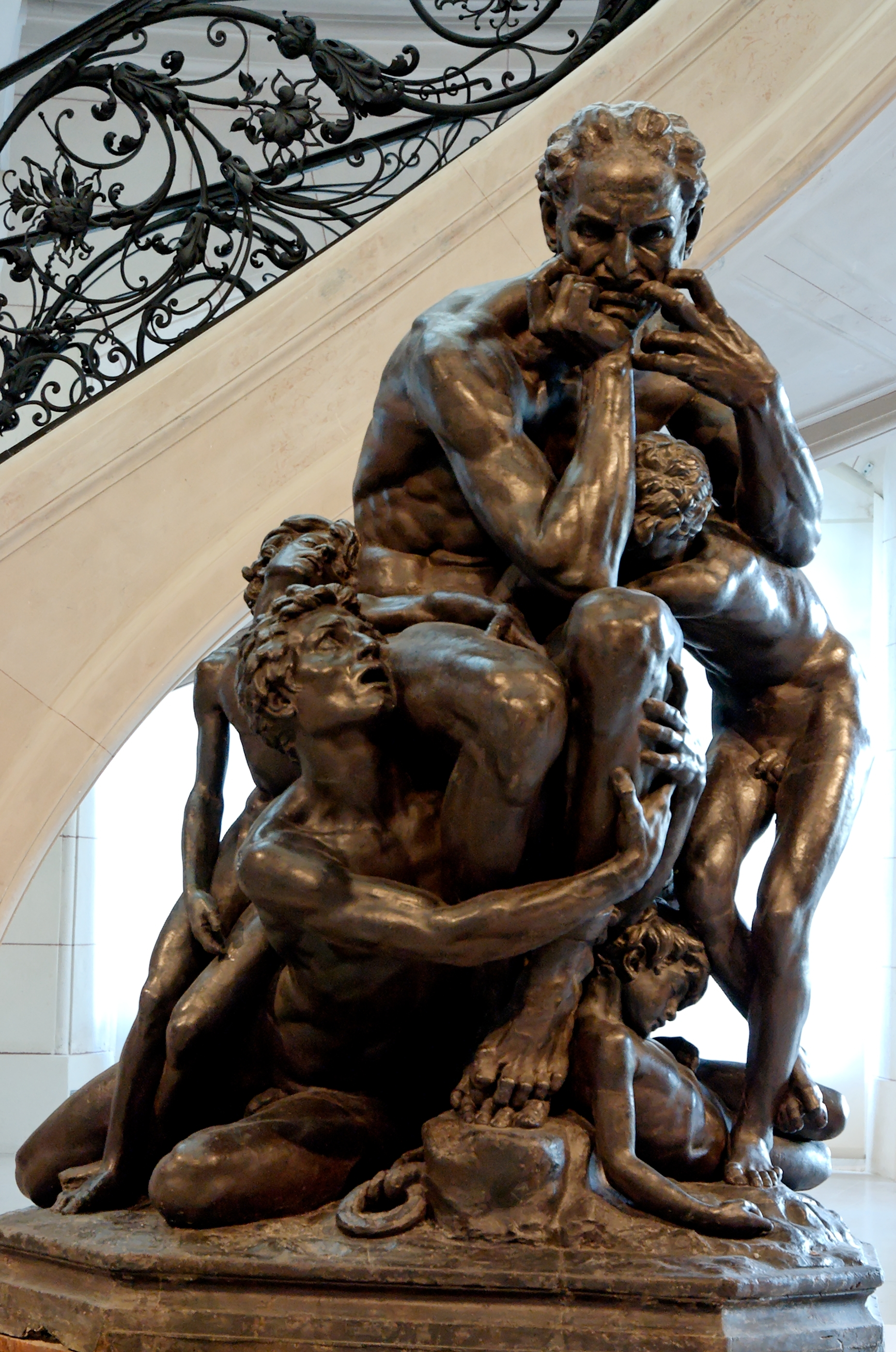
Ugolino and his sons by Jean-Baptiste Carpeaux, 1861, Petit Palais.

As head of his family, the Ghibelline party and podestà of Pisa, Ugolino took action to preserve his power in the face of the political hostility of Pisa's neighbours. In 1271, through a marriage of his sister with Giovanni Visconti, judge of Gallura, he allied himself with the Visconti, the leaders of the Guelphs in Pisa. In doing so, he aroused the suspicions of his fellow Ghibellines.

The subsequent disorders in the city in 1274 led to the arrest of both Ugolino and Giovanni, who were accused of plotting to undermine Pisa's government and, with the support from Tuscany's Guelphs, share power among themselves. Ugolino was imprisoned and Giovanni banished from Pisa. Giovanni Visconti died soon afterwards, and Ugolino, no longer regarded as a threat, was set free and banished. In exile, Ugolino immediately began to intrigue with the Guelph cities of Florence and Lucca. With the help of Charles I of Anjou, he attacked his native city and forced it to make peace on humiliating terms, pardoning him and all the other Guelph exiles. After his return, Ugolino at first remained aloof from politics but quietly worked to reassert his influence.

In 1284, war broke out between Pisa and Genoa and both Ugolino and Andreotto Saracini were appointed as captains of two divisions of fleets by Albertino Morosini, the Podestà of Pisa. The two fleets met in August in the Battle of Meloria. The Genoese fought valiantly and destroyed seven Pisan galleys and captured twenty-eight. Among the eleven thousand captives was the Podestà. Ugolino and his division set the sign of surrender and withdrew, deciding the battle in favour of Genoa. This flight was later interpreted as treachery but not by any writer earlier than the 16th century.

When Florence and Lucca took advantage of the naval defeat to attack Pisa, Ugolino was appointed podestà for a year and succeeded in pacifying them by ceding certain castles. When Genoa suggested peace on similar terms, Ugolino was less eager to accept, for the return of the Pisan prisoners, including most of the leading Ghibellines, would have diminished his power.

Ugolino, now appointed capitano del popolo for ten years, was now the most influential man in Pisa but was forced to share his power with his grandson Nino Visconti, son of Giovanni. The duumvirate did not last, as Ugolino and Nino soon quarrelled. In 1287, Nino, striving to become Podestà, entered into negotiations with Ruggieri degli Ubaldini, Archbishop of Pisa, and the Ghibellines. Ugolino reacted by driving Nino and several Ghibelline families out of the city, destroying their palaces and occupying the town hall, where he had himself proclaimed lord of the city.

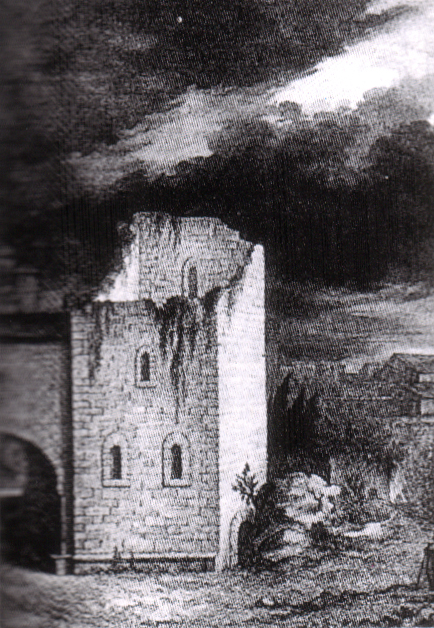
Torre della Muda, Giovanni Paolo Lasinio, engravings dated 1865.

In April of that year, Ugolino again refused to make peace with Genoa, even though the enemy was willing to be content with financial reparations. Ugolino still feared the return of the captured Pisans, who saw Ugolino as the cause for their prolonged captivity and had sworn to get their revenge for this.

In 1288, Pisa was hit by a dramatic increase in prices, resulting in food shortages and riots among the bitter populace. During one of these riots, Ugolino killed a nephew of the archbishop, turning the latter against him. On 1 July 1288, after leaving a council-meeting discussing peace with Genoa, Ugolino and his followers were attacked by a band of armed Ghibellines. Ugolino withdrew into the town hall and repelled all attacks. The archbishop, accusing Ugolino of treachery, aroused the citizens. When the town hall was set on fire, Ugolino surrendered. While his illegitimate son was killed, Ugolino himself – together with his sons Gaddo and Uguccione and his grandsons Nino (surnamed "the Brigand") and Anselmuccio – were detained in the Muda, a tower belonging to the Gualandi family. In March 1289, on orders of the archbishop, who had proclaimed himself podestà, the keys were thrown into the Arno river and the prisoners left to starve.

Their corpses were buried in the cloister of Saint Francis Church and remained there until 1902, when they were exhumed and transferred to the Gherardesca family chapel.

== Literary afterlife ==
The historical details of the episode are still involved in some obscurity, and although mentioned by Villani and other writers, it owes its fame entirely to Dante's Divine Comedy. Dante's account has been paraphrased by Chaucer in the Monk's Tale of the Canterbury Tales, as well as by Shelley. Irish poet Seamus Heaney also recounts the legend in his poem "Ugolino", a free translation from Dante, found in his 1979 book Field Work. Giovanni Pascoli writes of Ugolino in "Conte Ugolino", a poem from his Primi Poemetti.

=== Ugolino in Dante's Inferno ===
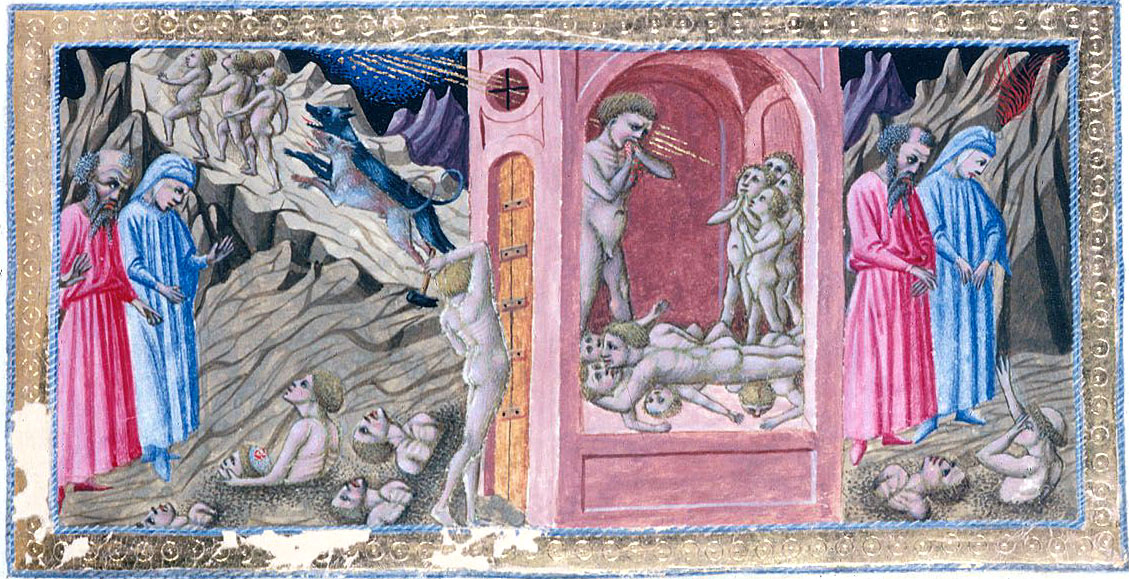
Dante and Virgil in the Inferno before Ugolino and His Sons by Priamo della Quercia (15th century)

Dante placed Ugolino and Ruggieri in the ice of the second ring (Antenora) of the lowest circle of the Inferno, which is reserved for betrayers of kin, country, guests, and benefactors.

Ugolino's punishment involves his being entrapped in ice up to his neck in the same hole with his betrayer, Archbishop Ruggieri, who left him to starve to death. Ugolino is constantly gnawing at Ruggieri's skull. As Dante describes it,

I saw two shades frozen in a single hole
packed so close, one head hooded the other one;
the way the starving devour their bread, the soul
above had clenched the other with his teeth
where the brain meets the nape.

— (Canto XXXII, lines 124–29),

Ugolino's gnawing of Ruggieri's head has been interpreted as meaning that Ugolino's hatred for his enemy is so strong that he is compelled to "devour even what has no substance." Ugolino, though punished for his betrayal of his people, is allowed some closure for the betrayal that he himself was forced to suffer under Ruggieri, when he is allowed to act as Ruggieri's torturer for eternity. According to Frances Yates, both are "suffering the torments of the damned in the traitors' hell; but Ugolino is given the right to oppress ... Archbishop Ruggieri with a ghastly eternal punishment which fits his crime."

=== Ugolino and his children ===
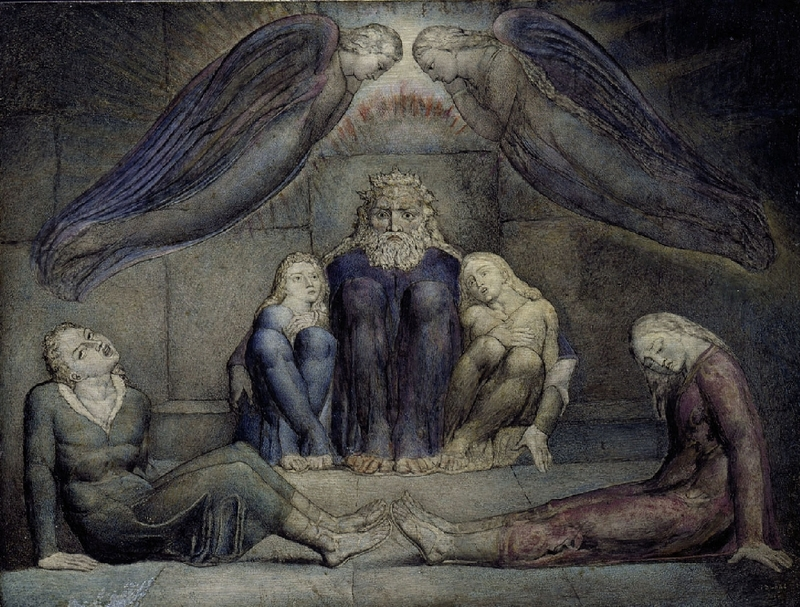
Ugolino and his sons in their cell, as painted by William Blake circa 1826.

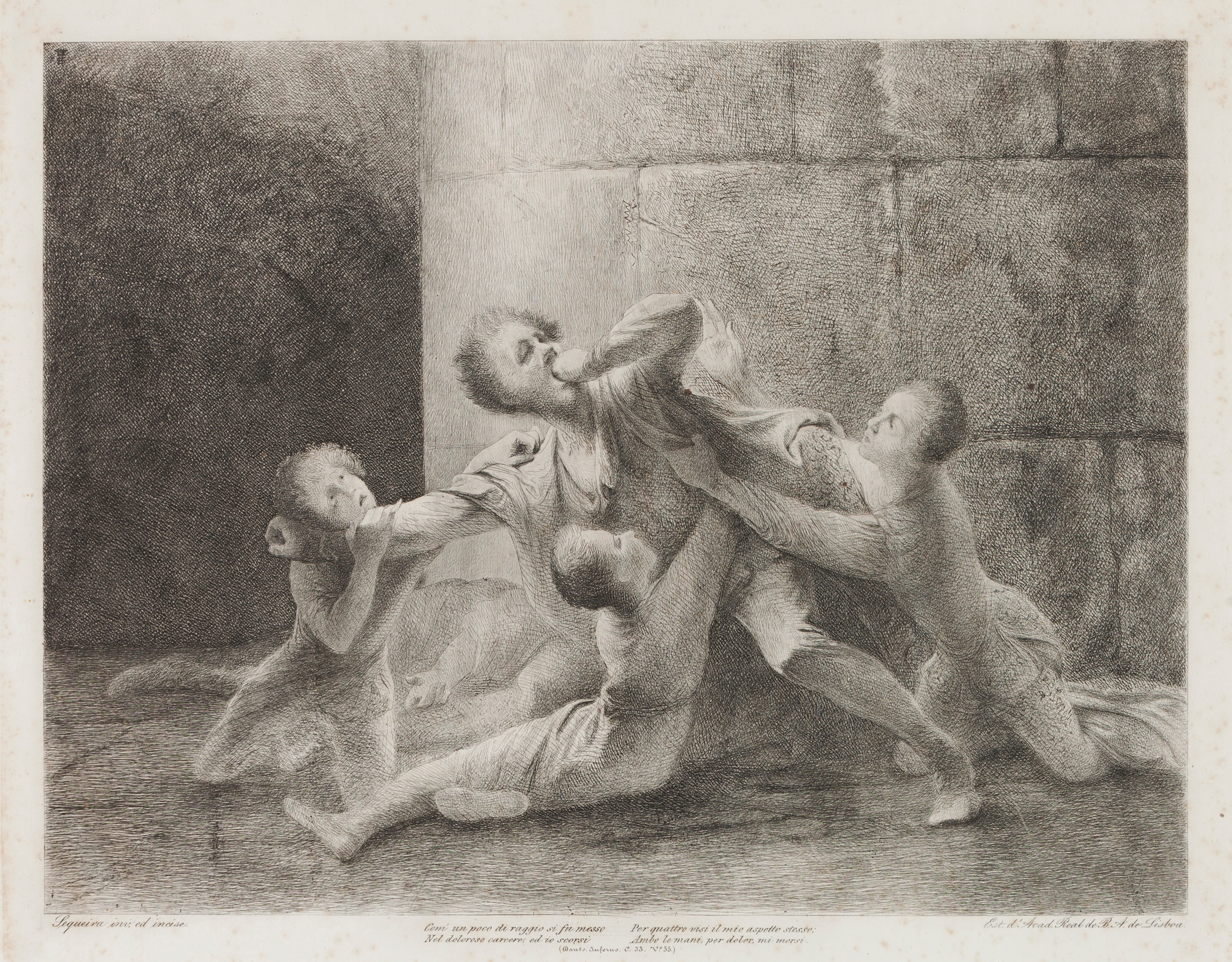
Ugolino gnawing at his own fingers, in an engraving by Domingos Sequeira

According to Dante, the prisoners were slowly starved to death and before dying Ugolino's children begged him to eat their bodies.

'Father our pain', they said,
'Will lessen if you eat us you are the one
Who clothed us with this wretched flesh: we plead
For you to be the one who strips it away'.

— (Canto XXXIII, ln. 56–59)

… And I,
Already going blind, groped over my brood
Calling to them, though I had watched them die,
For two long days. And then the hunger had more
Power than even sorrow over me

— (Canto XXXIII, ln. 70–73),

Ugolino's statement that hunger proved stronger than grief has been interpreted in two ways, either that Ugolino devoured his offspring's corpses after being driven mad with hunger, or that starvation killed him after he had failed to die of grief. The first and more ghastly of these interpretations has proved the more popular and resonant. For this reason Ugolino is known as the "Cannibal Count" and is often depicted gnawing at his own fingers ("eating of his own flesh") in consternation, as in the sculpture The Gates of Hell by Auguste Rodin, in Ugolino and his Sons by Jean-Baptiste Carpeaux and in other artwork, though this may also simply refer to Ugolino's own statement in the poem that he gnawed his fingers in grief.

=== Ugolino in Borges ===
The case of Ugolino and Ruggiero is behind the story of the short story "The Wait" (La espera) of Jorge Luis Borges in the collection named The Aleph (El Aleph) (1949).

== Scientific analysis of the remains ==
In 2002, paleoanthropologist Francesco Mallegni conducted DNA testing on the recently excavated bodies of Ugolino and his children. His analysis agrees with the remains being a father, his sons and his grandsons. Additional comparison to DNA from modern-day members of the Gherardesca family leave Mallegni about 98 percent sure that he has identified the remains correctly. However, the forensic analysis discredits the allegation of cannibalism. Analysis of the rib bones of the Ugolino skeleton reveals traces of magnesium, but no zinc, implying he had consumed no meat in the months before his death. Ugolino also had few remaining teeth and is believed to have been in his 70s when he was imprisoned, making it further unlikely that he could have outlived and eaten his descendants in captivity. Additionally, Mallegni notes that the putative Ugolino skull was damaged; perhaps he did not ultimately die of starvation, although malnourishment is evident.

In 2008, Paola Benigni, superintendent to the Archival Heritage of Tuscany, disputed Mallegni's findings in an article, claiming that the documents assigning the burial to Ugolino and his descendants were Fascist-era forgeries.

== Literature ==
- Paola Benigni, Massimo Becattini. "Ugolino della Gherardesca: cronaca di una scoperta annunciata". Archeologia Viva 128 (2008). pp. 64–67.
- Thomas Caldecot Chub. Dante and His World. Boston: Little, Brown and Co. (1996).
- Joan M. Ferrante. The Political Vision of the Divine Comedy. Princeton: Princeton University Press (1984).
- Robert Hollander. "Inferno XXXIII, 37–74: Ugolino's Importunity". Speculum 59(3) (July 1984), p. 549–55. doi:10.2307/2846299. JSTOR 2846299.
- Robert Hollander. Circle 9 The Trustees of Princeton University (1997).
- James Miller. Dante & the Unorthodox; The Aesthetics of Transgression. Waterloo, Canada: Wilfrid University Press (2005).
- Gilbert, Allan H. Dante's Conception of Justice. Duke University Press, 1925.
- Francesco Mallegni, M. Luisa Ceccarelli Lemut. Il conte Ugolino di Donoratico tra antropologia e storia (2003). ISBN 88-8492-059-0.
- Nicole Martinelli, "Dante and the Cannibal Count", Newsweek (1 February 2007).
- Guy P. Raffa. Circle 9, Cantos 31–34. University of Texas at Austin (2002).
- Theodore Spencer. "The Story of Ugolino in Dante and Chaucer". Speculum 9(3) (July 1934), p. 295–301. doi:10.2307/2853896. JSTOR 2853896.
- Paget Toynbee, A Dictionary of the Proper Names and Notable Matters in the Works of Dante, Oxford University Press (1968).
- Frances A. Yates. "Transformations of Dante's Ugolino". Journal of the Warburg and Courtauld Institutes 14(1/2) (1951), p. 92–117. doi:10.2307/750354. JSTOR 750354.
