= Porta Faul, Viterbo =

Coordinates: 42.41556°N 12.09832°E

Porta Faul is a western portals in the medieval walls of Viterbo. It is located on at the start of via Faul, at the circle of the Piazza Martire delle Fosse or Foibe Istriana in Viterbo, region of Lazio, Italy. In the hill in town, above the gate, is located the Palazzo dei Papi. The via Faul leads to a public parking lot outside the ZTL (limited traffic zone) of Viterbo. In a bleak stone building outside the gate, is the former Chiesa dei Giustiziati (Church of Executed) that ministered to those receiving capital punishment.

== History and description ==
The stone gate was opened in 1568 inside of a medieval tower, shortened in the process, located along the walls. The opening was patronized by Cardinal Alessandro Farnese, after he authorized sealing the Porta di Valle. The Cardinal and the date are mentioned on the plaque over the entrance. On the outer facade, in the center is displayed the Farnese coat of arms with multiple fleur de lis. To the right is a smaller shield with the coat of arms of the town of Viterbo (lion and palm); on the left are the heraldic shield of a papal legate, Ansoino Polo. The gate was previously called Porta Farnesiana and putatively the architect was Vignola. The gate is named due to the proximity to the Valle di Faul.
