= Camposanto Monumentale =

Cemetery, historical edifice in Pisa, Italy

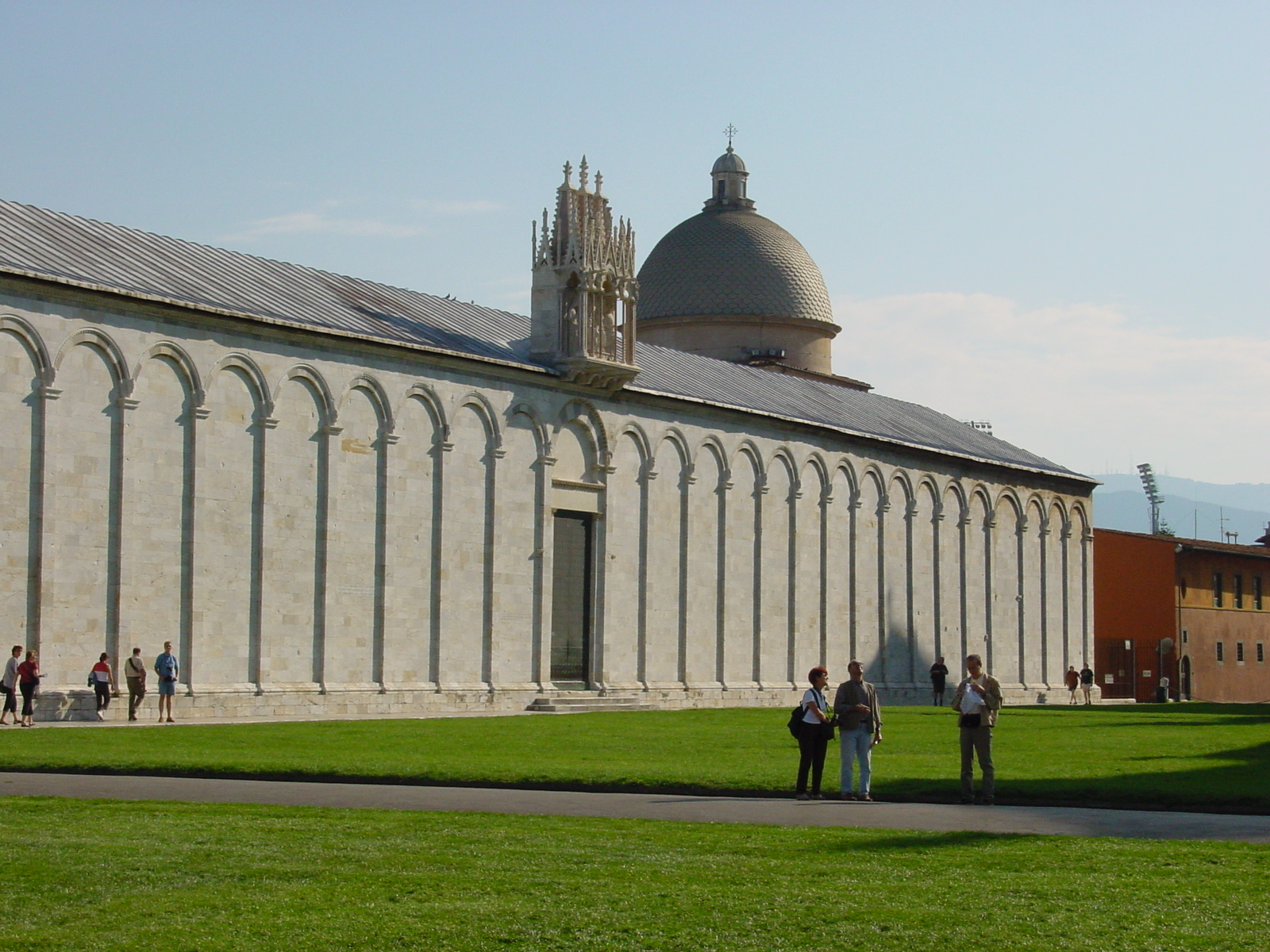
- The Camposanto Monumentale, part of the Piazza dei Miracoli in Pisa.
- Interactive map of Camposanto Monumentale

Details
- Established: 12th century
- Location: Pisa, Tuscany
- Country: Italy
- Coordinates: 43.724°N 10.395°E
- Find a Grave: Camposanto Monumentale

UNESCO World Heritage Site
- Part of: Piazza del Duomo, Pisa
- Criteria: Cultural: (i), (ii), (iv), (vi)
- Reference: 395bis
- Inscription: 1987 (11th Session)
- Extensions: 2007

The Camposanto Monumentale ("Monumental Cemetery"), (Note: The term "monumental" serves to differentiate it from the later-established urban cemetery in Pisa.) also Camposanto Vecchio ("Old Cemetery") or simply Campo Santo, is a historical edifice at the northern edge of the Cathedral Square in Pisa, Italy.

Campo Santo can be literally translated as "holy field", because it is said to have been built around a shipload of sacred soil from Golgotha, brought to Pisa from the Third Crusade by Ubaldo Lanfranchi, archbishop of Pisa in the 12th century. A legend claims that bodies buried in that ground will rot in just 24 hours. The burial ground lies over the ruins of the old baptistery of Santa Reparata, the church that once stood where the cathedral now stands.

== History ==
The building was the fourth and last one to be raised in the Cathedral Square. It dates from a century after the bringing of the soil from Golgotha, and was erected over the earlier burial ground.

The construction of this huge, oblong Gothic cloister was begun in 1278 by the architect Giovanni di Simone. He died in 1284 when Pisa suffered a defeat in the naval battle of Meloria against the Genoans. The cemetery was only completed in 1464.

It seems that the building was not meant to be a real cemetery, but a church called Santissima Trinità (Most Holy Trinity), but the project changed during the construction. However we know that the original part was the western one (and this should be, at least for a while, the mentioned church), and all the eastern part was the last to be built, finally closing the structure.

== Building ==
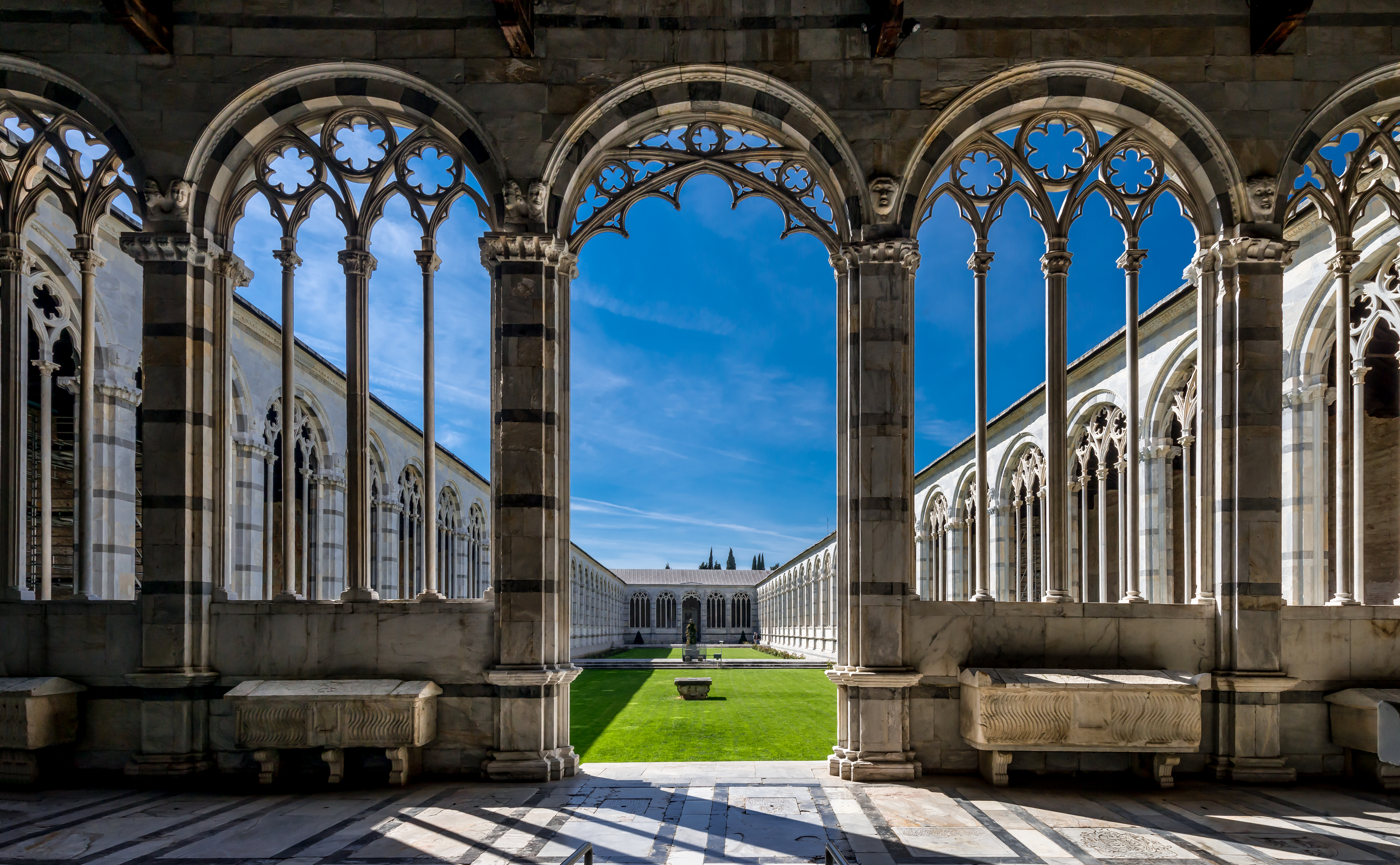
Gothic arcades enclosing the courtyard of Campo Santo

The outer wall is composed of 43 blind arches. There are two doorways. The one on the right is crowned by a gracious Gothic tabernacle. It contains the Virgin Mary with Child, surrounded by four saints. It is the work from the second half of the 14th century by a follower of Giovanni Pisano. This was the original entrance door. Most of the tombs are under the arcades, although a few are on the central lawn. The inner court is surrounded by elaborate round arches with slender mullions and plurilobed tracery.

The cemetery has three chapels. The oldest ones are the chapel Ammannati (1360) and takes its name from the tomb of Ligo Ammannati, a teacher in the University of Pisa; and the chapel Aulla, were there is an altar made by Giovanni della Robbia in 1518. In the Aulla chapel we can see also the original incense lamp that Galileo Galilei used for calculation of pendular movements. This lamp is the one Galileo saw inside the cathedral, now replaced by a larger more elaborate one. The last chapel was Dal Pozzo, commissioned by archbishop of Pisa Carlo Antonio Dal Pozzo in 1594; it has an altar dedicated to St. Jerome and a little dome. In this chapel in 2009 were translated the relics of the cathedral: the relics include among the others eleven of the twelve Apostles, two fragments of the True Cross, a thorn from the Crown of Thorns of Christ and a small piece of the dress of the Virgin Mary. Also in the Dal Pozzo chapel sometimes a Mass is celebrated.

== Sarcophagi ==
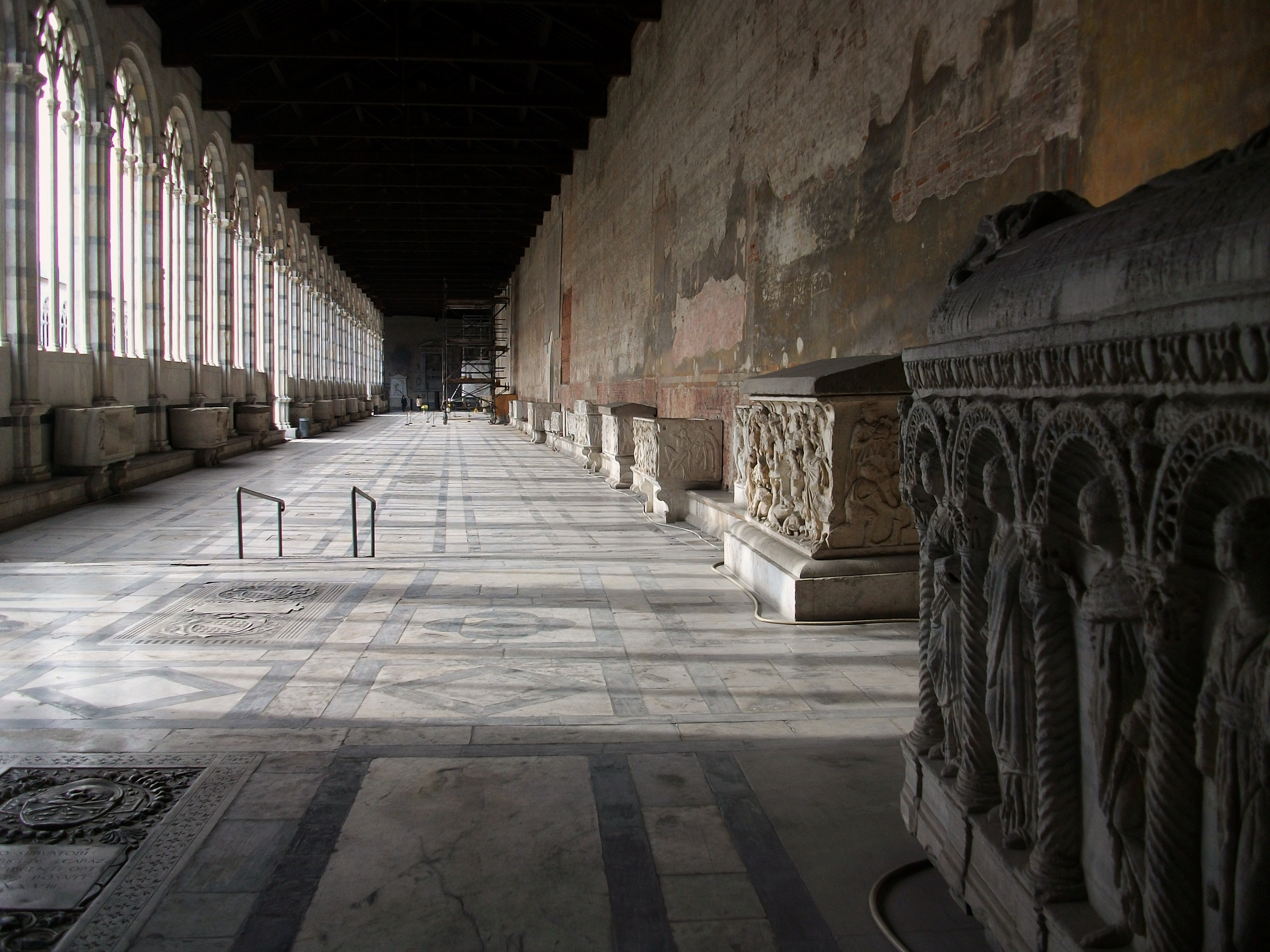
Roman sarcophagi

The Campo Santo contained a huge collection of Roman sarcophagi, but there are only 84 left together with a collection of Roman and Etruscan sculptures and urns, now in the Museum of the vestry board.

The sarcophagi were initially all around the cathedral, often attached to the building itself until the cemetery was built. They were then collected in the middle all over the meadow. In the years he was the curator of the Campo Santo, Carlo Lasinio collected many other ancient relics that were spread in Pisa to make a sort of archeological museum inside the cemetery. At present, the sarcophagi are inside the galleries, near the walls.

== Frescoes ==
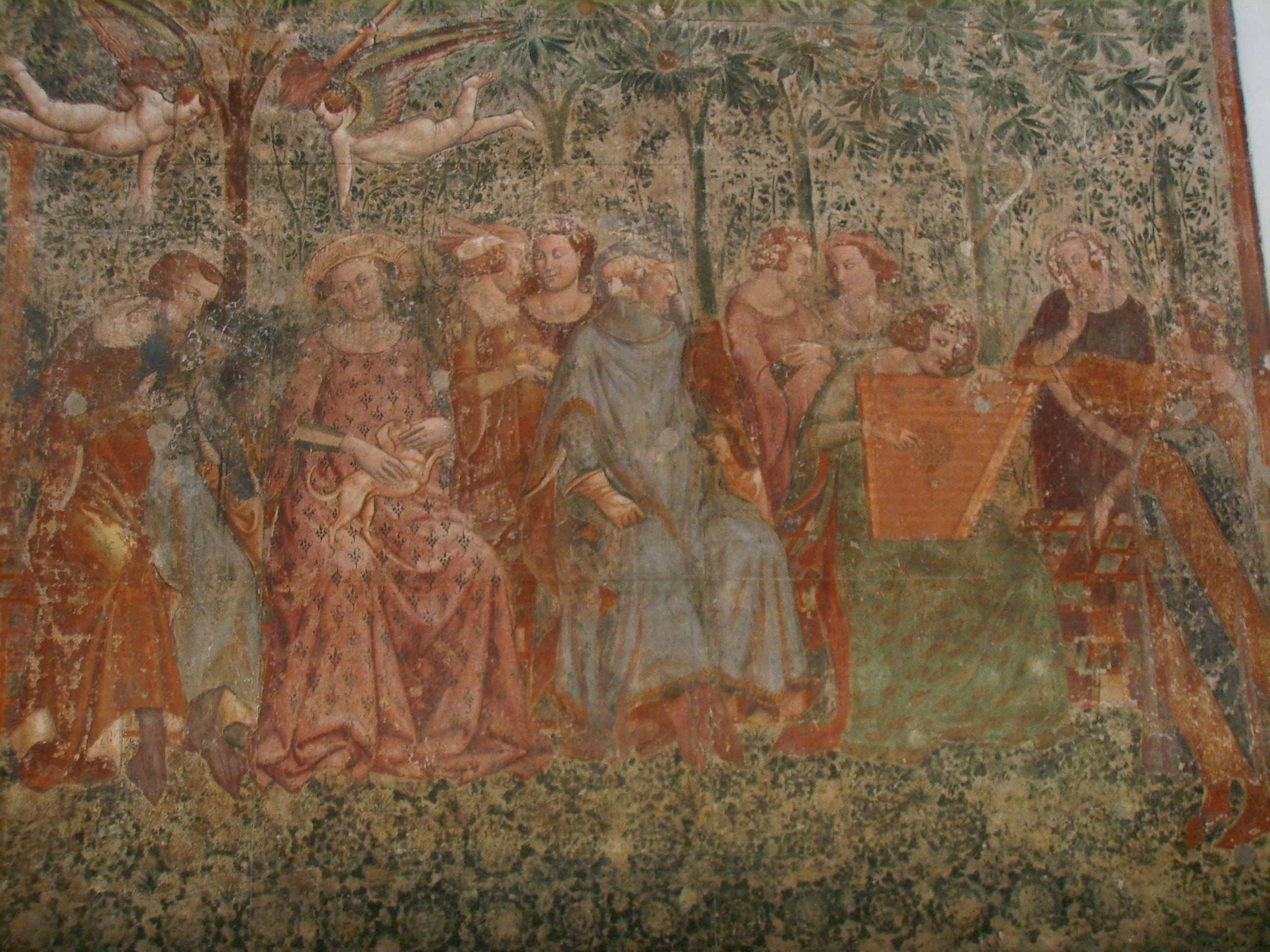
The Triumph of Death

The walls of the vast structure were covered in over 2600 meters squared of frescoes, a greater expanse than the Sistine Chapel. The earliest, attributed to Francesco Traini, were painted 1336/41 in the south-western corner. The Last Judgement, Hell, Triumph of Death, and the Thebaid (stories of the Desert Fathers), usually attributed to Buonamico di Martino da Firenze, detto il Buffalmacco, were painted in the years after the Black Death. The cycle of frescoes continues with the Stories of the Old Testament by Benozzo Gozzoli (15th century) that were situated in the north gallery, while in the south arcade were the Stories of Pisan Saints, by Andrea Bonaiuti, Antonio Veneziano and Spinello Aretino (between 1377 and 1391), and the Stories of Job, by Taddeo Gaddi (end of 14th century). In the same time, in the north gallery were the Stories of the Genesis by Piero di Puccio. The last images date from the early 17th century.

On 27 July 1944, a bomb fragment from an Allied raid started a fire in the Camposanto, which burned for three days, causing the timber lead roof to collapse. The destruction of the roof severely damaged everything inside the cemetery, destroying most of the sculptures and sarcophagi and compromising all the frescoes. An initial effort to rescue the frescoes was organized by Deane Keller of the U.S. Army's Monuments, Fine Arts, and Archives program. Pieces of the frescoes were salvaged and a temporary roof was erected to prevent further damage.

After World War II, restoration work began. The roof was restored as closely as possible to its pre-war appearance and the frescoes were separated from the walls to be restored and displayed elsewhere. Once the frescoes had been removed, the preliminary drawings, called sinopie were also removed. These under-drawings were separated using the same technique used on the frescoes and now they are in the Museum of the Sinopie, on the opposite side of the Square.

The adhesivity of the casein glue, initially used to fix the paint layers to wooden supports, failed after mold penetrated the glue. This required the ungluing, transferring again, and re-affixing of all the paintings to new supports. To prevent intramural condensation from seeping into the panels, an elaborate system of sensors woven into a synthetic fabric was placed between wall and panel. These sensors adjust the temperature of the wall to within 3 degrees of the ambient temperature every 10 minutes, thus preventing condensation.

The restoration campaign concluded with the reinstallation of part of the Buffalmacco cycle in 2005; the Thebaid frescoes in 2014; Hell in 2015; the Last Judgement in 2017; and the Triumph of Death on April 7, 2018.

== Sources ==
- Tobino, Mario (1982). Pisa la Piazza dei Miracoli. De Agostini.
