= Orto Botanico dell'Università della Tuscia =

Botanical garden in Italy

Coordinates: 42°26′32″N 12°03′54″E

The Orto Botanico dell'Università della Tuscia (15 hectares) is a natural area and botanical garden operated by Tuscia University and located at Località Bulicame, Strada S. Caterina, Viterbo, Lazio, Italy.

The garden was established in 1985 and officially inaugurated in 1991. It lies on the Viterbo plains beneath the Monti Cimini and is divided into the botanical garden proper (6 hectares) and the Park Bulicame natural area (9 hectares), source of a sulphurous thermal spring. The garden is organized into reconstructions of African oasis, Australian subtropical vegetation, Mediterranean scrub, and Mexican desert. Collections include an evolutionary display of pines, as well as agave, aloe, bamboo, Cereus, Chamaerops humilis, Cordyline australis, Ginkgo biloba, Euphorbia, Opuntia, Phoenix canariensis, P. dactilifera, and Washingtonia filifera.

== See also ==
- List of botanical gardens in Italy
