= Francesco Mallegni =

Italian paleontologist (1940–2025)

- Born: 14 February 1940; Camaiore, Italy
- Died: 11 September 2025 (aged 85); Pisa, Tuscany, Italy
- Education: University of Pisa
- Scientific career
- Fields: Paleoanthropology
- Academic advisors: Don Raffaello Parenti

Francesco Mallegni (14 February 1940 – 11 September 2025) was an Italian paleoanthropologist and author of forensic facial reconstructions of several Italian Medieval persons.

Mallegni was an assistant professor in 1973, promoted to associate in 1980, and from 2002 worked as professor of paleoanthropology at the Department of Archaeological Sciences in Pisa and Siena.

== Research ==
In 2002 Mallegni conducted DNA testing on the recently excavated bodies of the Ugolino and his children. His analysis agreed with the remains being a father, his sons and his grandsons. Additional comparison to DNA from modern day members of the Della Gherardesca family left Mallegni about 98 percent sure that he had identified the remains correctly. forensic analysis discredited the allegation of cannibalism. Analysis of the rib bones of the Ugolino skeleton revealed traces of magnesium, but no zinc, implying he had consumed no meat in the months before his death. Ugolino also had few remaining teeth and is believed to have been in his 70s when he was imprisoned, making it further unlikely that he could have outlived and eaten his descendants in captivity. Additionally, Mallegni noted that the putative Ugolino skull was damaged; perhaps he did not ultimately die of starvation, although malnourishment was evident.

During an excavation in the 1970s, bones were discovered beneath the paving of Santa Reparata at a spot close to the location given by Vasari, but unmarked on either level. Forensic examination of the bones by Mallegni and a team of experts in 2000 brought to light some facts that seemed to confirm that they were those of an Italian painter Giotto, particularly the range of chemicals, including arsenic and lead, both commonly found in paint, that the bones had absorbed.

In 2005, Mallegni and Giacomo Michelini studied the corpse of Pope Gregory VII that had been undisturbed since 1975. In 2007, Mallegni gave Dante's image a new 3D look. The new face shows softer traits: large eyes, a rounded jaw and a gentler expression, although the nose remains crooked. The multidisciplinary project to reconstruct Dante's face lasted about two months, using a plaster model of the skull, 3D computer technology, and other techniques to simulate muscles and skin.

- Mona Lisa
- Saint Homobonus
- Andrea Mantegna
- Vespasiano Gonzaga
- Luigi Boccherini

== Death ==
Mallegni died on 11 September 2025, at the age of 85.

== Books ==
- I neandertaliani. Comparsa e scomparsa di una specie by David Caramelli, Francesco Mallegni Brunetto Chiarelli (1 January 2009)
- Memorie dal sottosuolo e dintorni. Metodologie per un «recupero e trattamenti adeguati» dei resti umani erratici e da sepolture by Francesco Mallegni (1 January 2005)
- Il conte Ugolino di Donoratico tra antropologia e storia by M. Luisa Ceccarelli Lemut Francesco Mallegni (1 January 2003)
