= Porta Romana, Viterbo =

Coordinates: 42.41446°N 12.10993°E

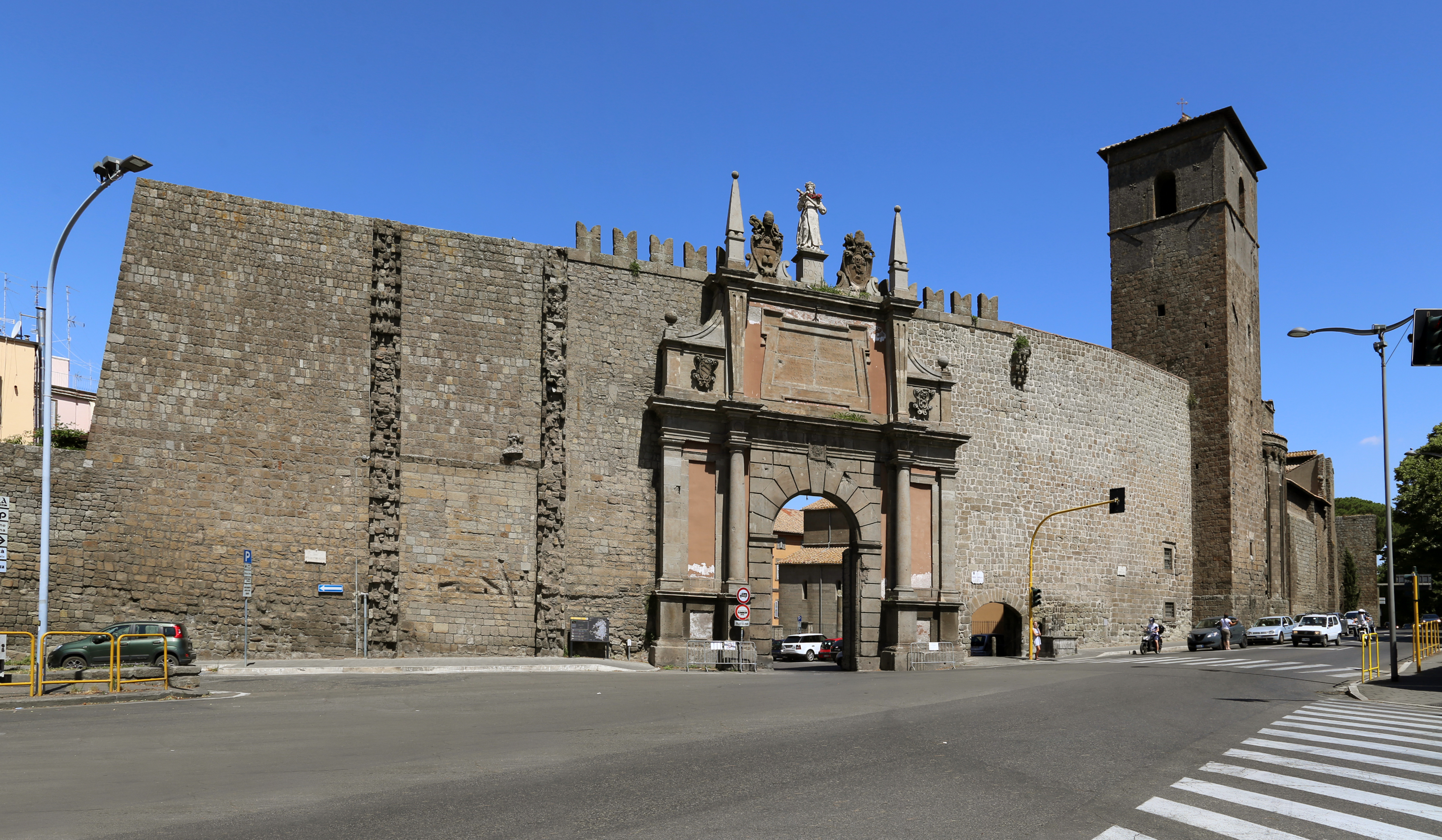
Porta Romana

Porta Romana is a southeastern portals in the medieval walls of Viterbo. The merlionated gate, with Baroque decoration is located on at exit point of Via Garibaldi, where it meets highway SS2 as it skirts the historic center of Viterbo, region of Lazio, Italy. South of the gate is a train station (Stazione di Viterbo Porta Romana), with local lines linking to Rome, and just west is the campus of Tuscia University, which occupies some of an old Dominican monastery and Villa Gentili. Just north inside the walls, is the church of San Sisto.

== History and description ==
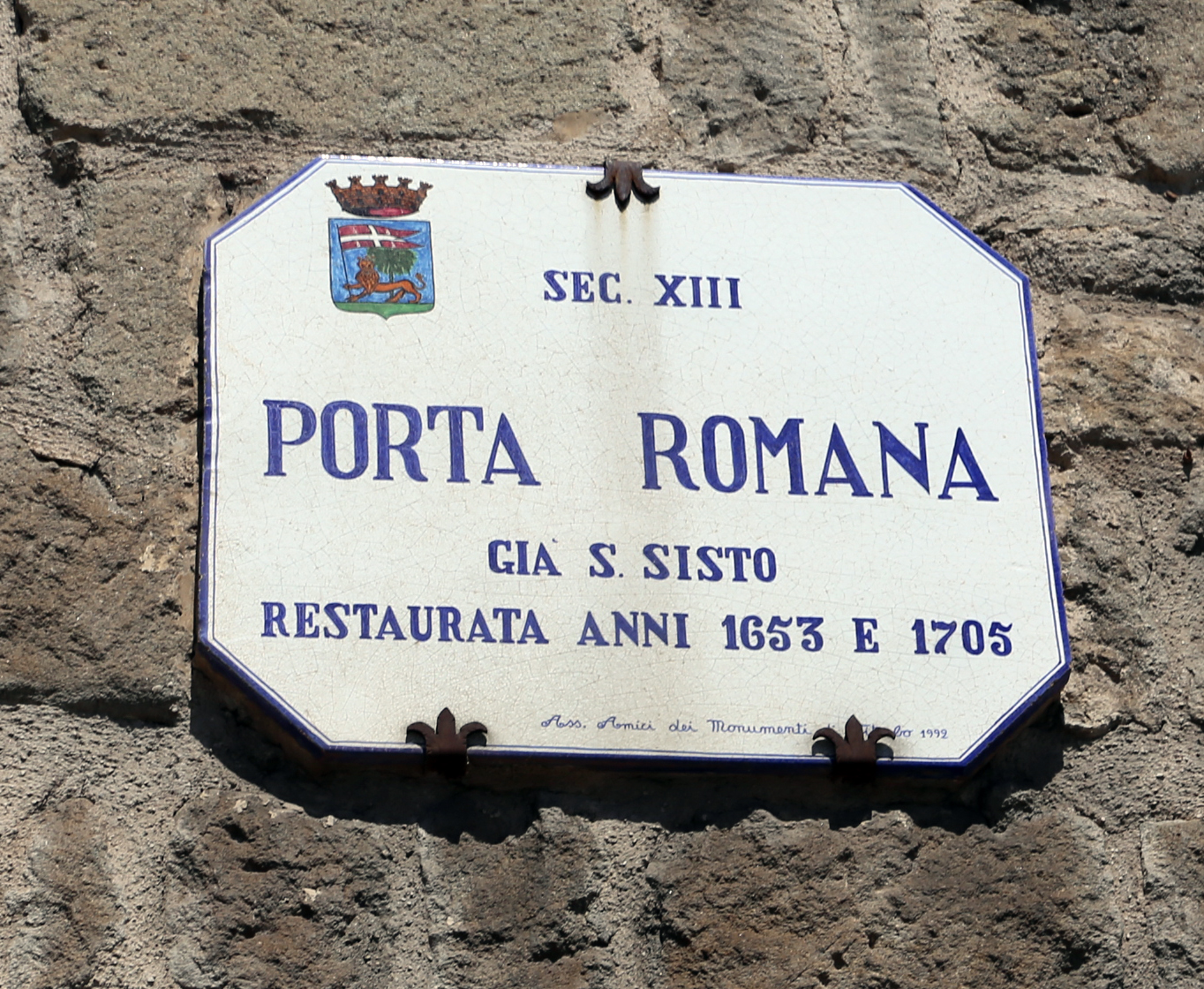

This gate, as seen from outside the walls, was built in 1649 by Francesco Maiolino. The walls at this point are decorated by Ghibelline (swallow-tail shaped) merlons. It replaced the Porta San Sisto, which is now incorporated into a tall tower to the right of the door, that serves as a bell-tower for the church. An epigraph above the gate, dated 1705, credits the then governor of the province, Marcellino Albergotti, with decorations. Facing outward, above the portal is a depiction of the youthful Santa Rosa of Viterbo, patron saint of the town. The statue is flanked by the coat of arms of Pope Clement XI and Pope Innocent X. The gate at the time was named Porta Pamphilia, or Innocenziana, because it was inaugurated in 1643 when Pope Innocent X Pamphili came to visit his sister-in-law Olimpia Maidalchini. The gate is now called Romana because it is on the road that led to Rome.

In the guide from 1920, it is said that the effects of an attack in 1798 by troops led by General Kellerman were still visible on the structure.
