= Torre dei Gualandi =

Tower in Pisa, Italy

Coordinates: 43°43′10.67″N 10°23′58.28″E

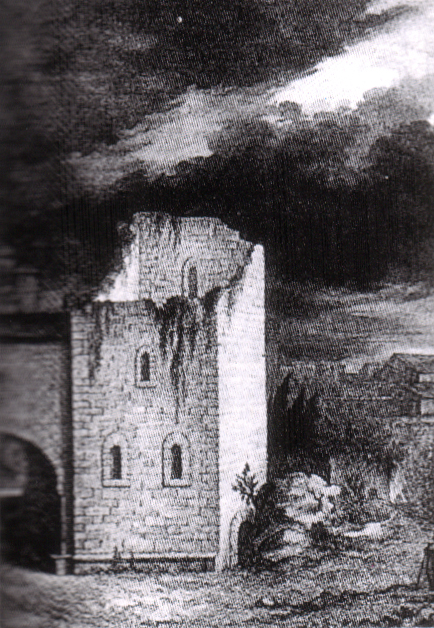
Torre della Muda, Giovanni Paolo Lasinio, engravings dated 1865

The Torre dei Gualandi (also known as the Muda Tower) is a former tower in Pisa, central Italy, now included in the Palazzo dell'Orologio.

It is located on the north part of the Piazza dei Cavalieri. The original tower was located on the right side of the present building. Gualandi was the name of a Pisan family that owned the tower in the 13th century.

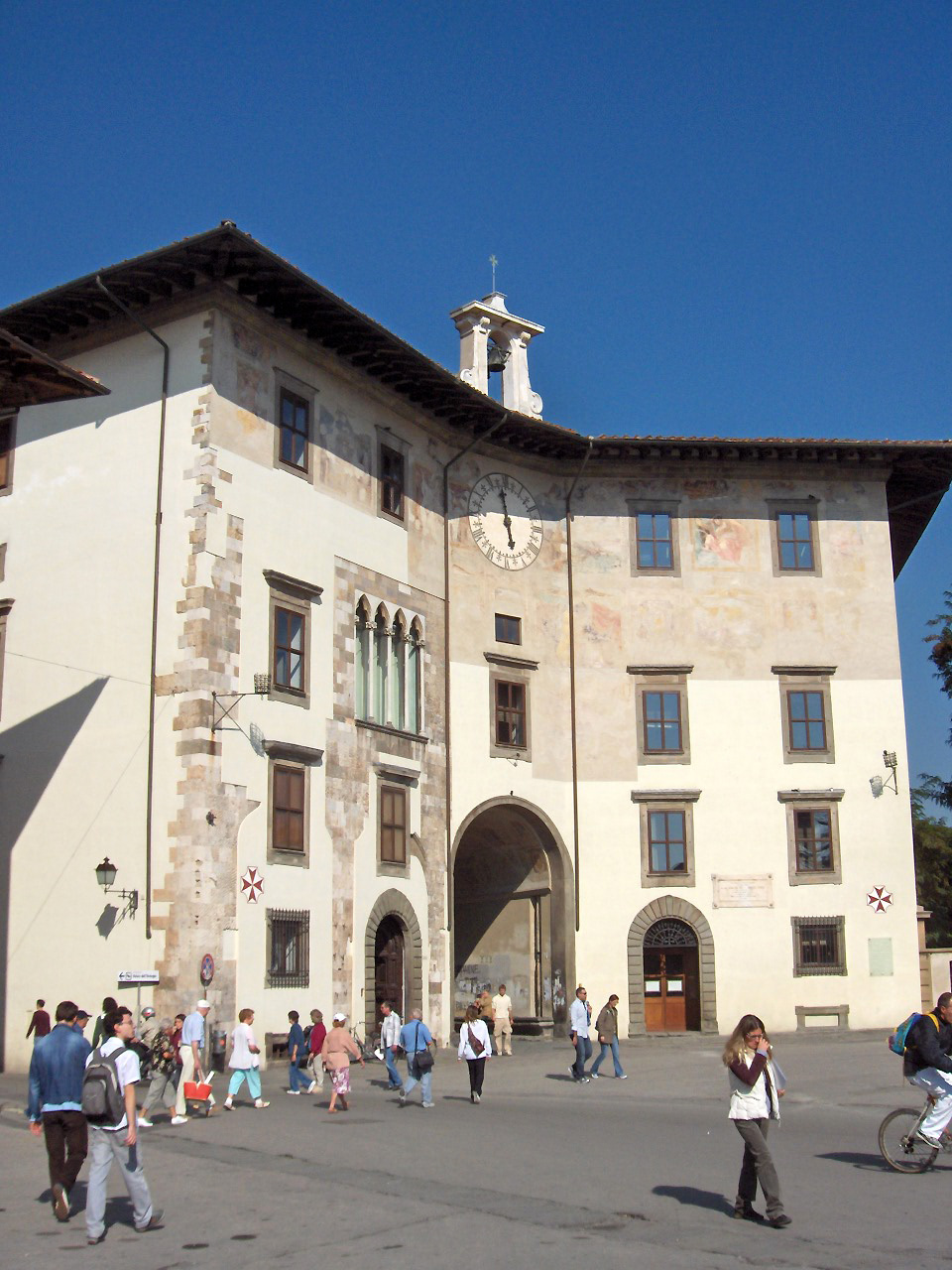
Palazzo dell'Orologio

Ugolino della Gherardesca, his sons and two grandsons were immured in the tower and starved to death in the 13th century. Dante, his contemporary, wrote about Gherardesca in his masterpiece The Divine Comedy.
