= Giovanni Paolo Lasinio =

Italian painter

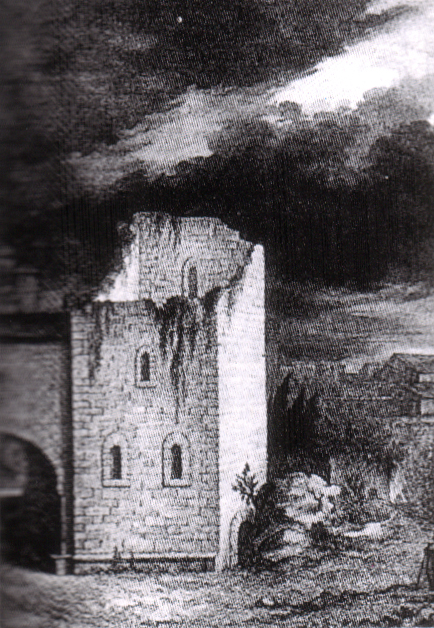
Torre della Muda, Giovanni Paolo Lasinio, engravings dated 1865

Giovanni Paolo Lasinio (c. 1796–1855) was an Italian engraver and painter.

== Biography ==
He was the son of the engraver Carlo Lasinio, and together with Rossi engraved forty-four plates of the Campo Santo at Pisa (1832), and took part in the decorations of the Galleries at Florence and Turin. He executed the plates for Ippolito Rosellini's Monumenti dell' Egitto e de la Nubia (Monuments of Egypt and Nubia) (1833–44).
