= Carlo Lasinio =

Italian painter

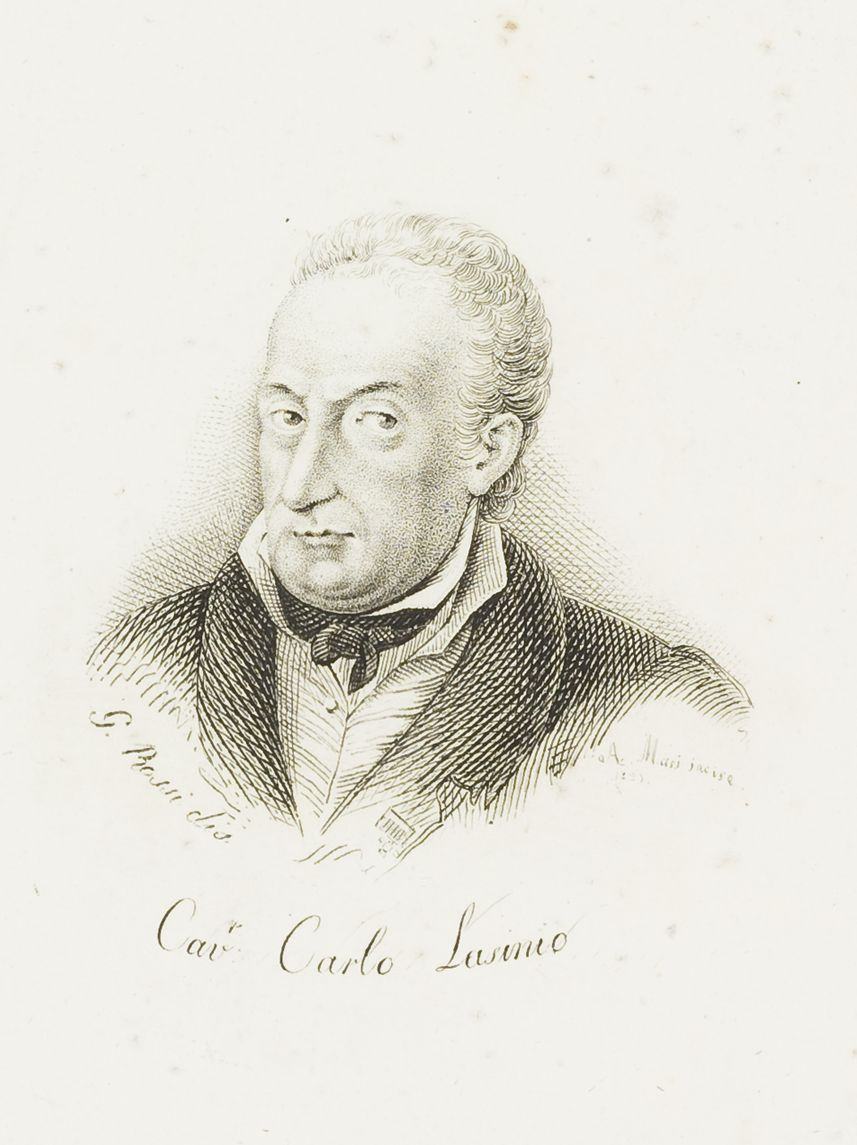
Carlo Lasinio

Carlo Lasinio (Treviso 10 February 1759 – 29 March 1838 Pisa) was an Italian engraver.

== Biography ==
He was born at Treviso, but worked chiefly at Florence. Lasinio started as a painter at the Accademia di Belle Arti in Venice. He quickly placed more emphasis on printmaking, especially after moving to Florence in 1778. He established his reputation with two large series of etchings in 1787 and 1789. Lasinio also taught engraving at the Accademia in Florence, becoming a Professor in 1800.

One of Lasinio's etchings of frescoes in Camposanto, Pisa, depicting the Last Judgement and Hell

Lasinio moved to Pisa in 1807, taking up the position of conservatore of the Camposanto. He made considerable efforts to protect the Camposanto and its frescoes from ruin, from which it was threatened due to the destructive effects of the Napoleonic Wars. In 1812 he began his influential book of etchings, recording the frescoes in the Camposanto. This was entitled, Pitture a fresco del Campo Santo di Pisa. These large etchings were composed in the sharply defined "outline style", which was popular in the early nineteenth century in reaction to the soft tonal effects of 18th century stipple engravers such as Francesco Bartolozzi. These works proved to be very influential on 19th-century European art, particularly on the Pre-Raphaelites in Britain. According to William Holman Hunt, study of Lasinio's book convinced the group to reject High Renaissance art in favour of these earlier works. Lasinio's engravings also proved an important record of the frescoes, which were eventually severely damaged by bombing in World War II.

Other works depicting the old masters included his forty plates of Frescoes and Oil Paintings at Florence (1789), large etchings which delineated the most famous Renaissance frescoes in Florence; and thirty-two plates of Frescoes of the Fourteenth and Fifteenth Centuries.

Among his other activities Lasinio also founded the Academy in Pisa, where he died. Apart from his many series of engravings and etchings, Lasinio also created original images. His portrayals of eminent Italians include the great explorers, Christopher Columbus and Amerigo Vespucci.

His son, Giovanni Paolo Lasinio, was also an engraver.

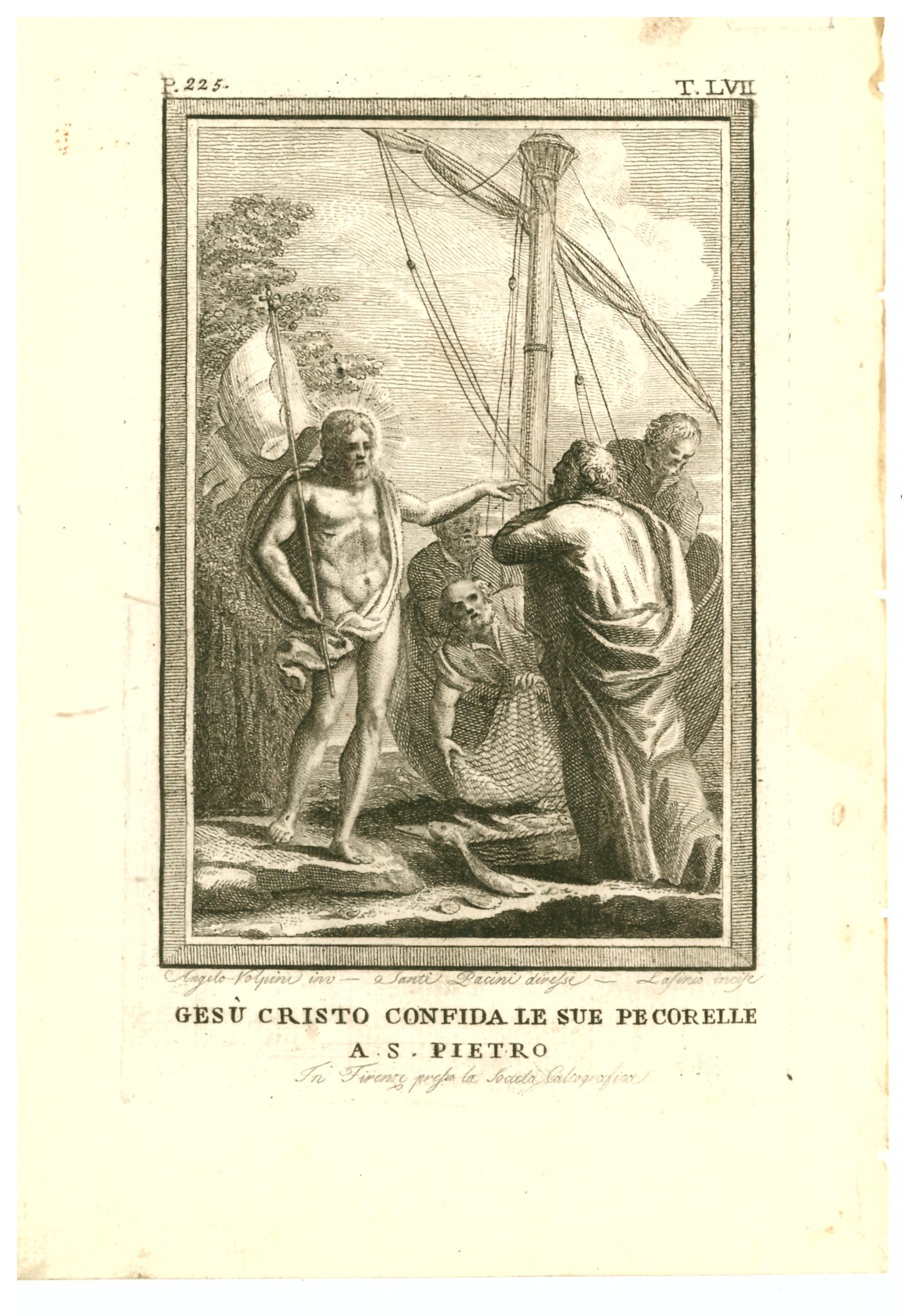
Carlo Lasinio 1797, "Gesù Cristo confida le sue pecorelle a San Pietro"

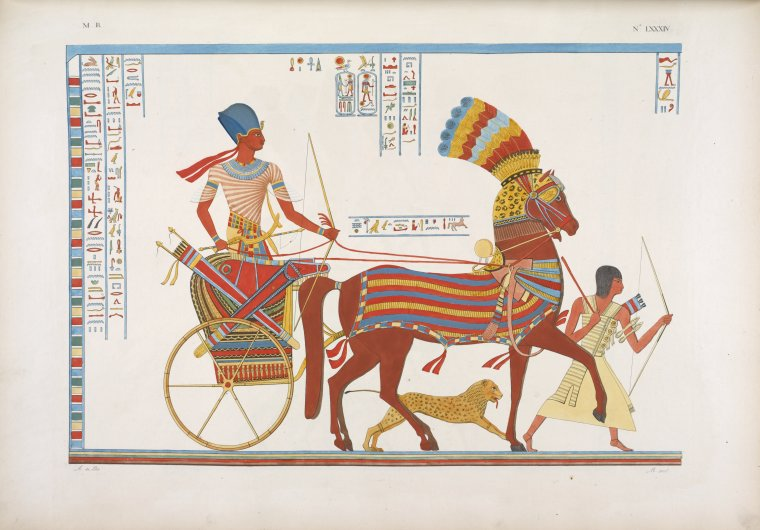
Egyptian Chariot
