= San Sisto, Viterbo =

Church building in Viterbo, Italy

Coordinates: 42.4148°N 12.1097°E

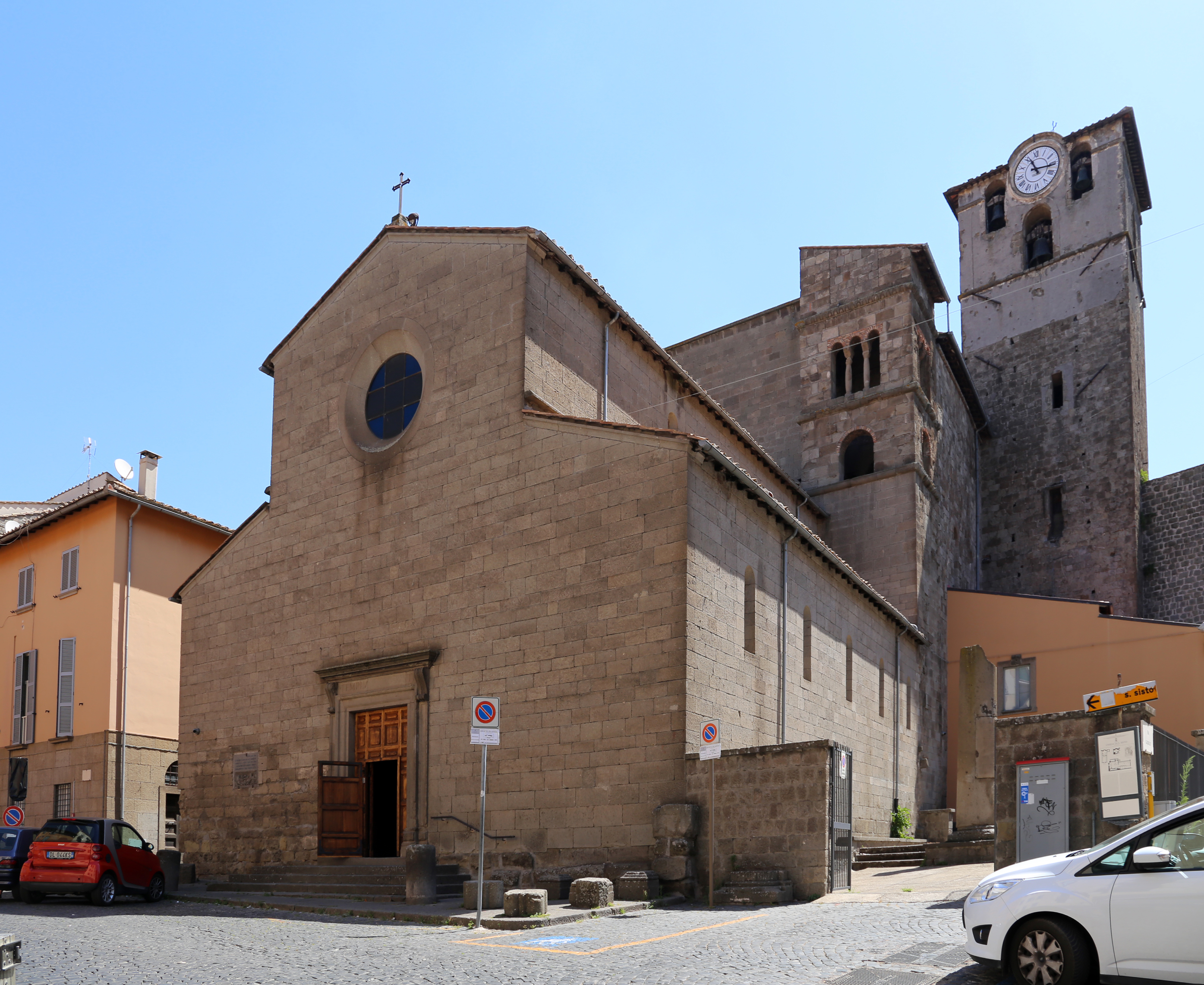
Exterior

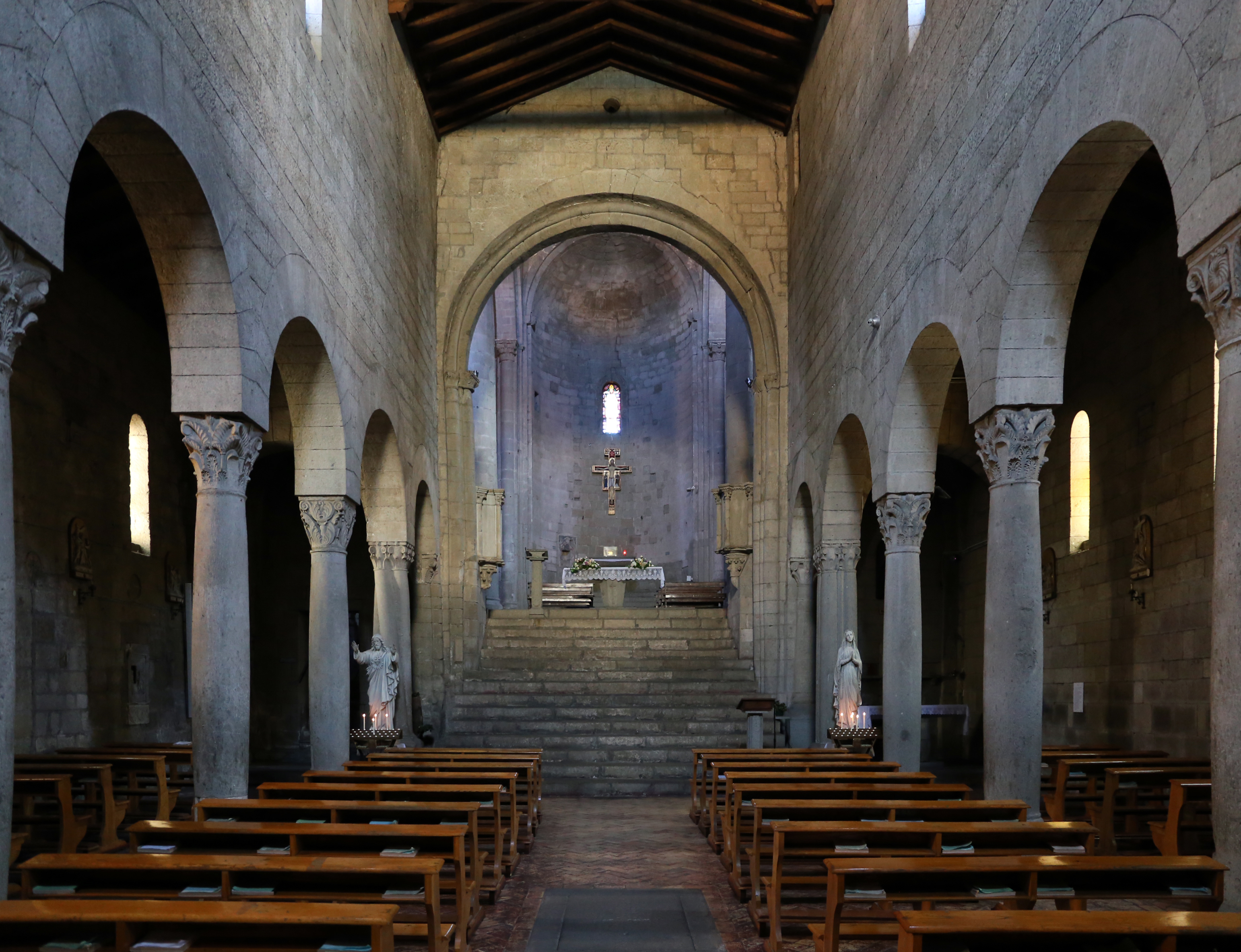
Interior

San Sisto is a Romanesque-style Roman Catholic church in the town of Viterbo in the Region of Lazio. The church was once known as San Sisto fuori la Porta Romana.

== Description ==
In Pinzi's 1894 guide to the principal monuments of Viterbo, he cites the presence of an Ancient Roman altar, used as a baptismal font, that this was originally a pagan temple converted into a church by the 5th or 6th century. He also noted an altar composed of early Romaneque decorations and the Lombard-style bell-tower to assert the presence of a church here by the 7th to 8th centuries.

However the church we see today, likely dates to after the eighth century, when a neighborhood called Vico Quinzano formed in this area. The first documentation notes a church of San Sisto was present by 1037. Until 1649, the gateway to Viterbo on the main road from Rome, was at the site now of the towering bell-tower on the wall. The San Sisto gate was closed in 1649, when the adjacent and still present Porta Romana was completed. The neighborhood here is now called Porta Romana.

By the 12th-century, under the papacy of Pasquale II, the temple was made a parish church. Subsequent popes added further privileges, including to perform baptisms. The church underwent numerous refurbishments over the centuries. In May 1944, the church was heavily damaged during an allied bombardment. The subsequent refurbishment stripped all of the baroque decorations and many of the side altars that had proliferated over the centuries.

A 19th-century description of the church bemoaned the state of the church:

Later transformations embellished even more brutally, the primitive style of this temple. The vaults were designed to conceal the old skeletal roofs of the aisles: many altars ripped through the majestic nakedness of the walls and insolent masons covered them with mortar giving in to those who can care not a whit how many paintings, inscriptions and other precious memories existed in that place.

The simple facade was reconstructed after the war. The lower of two belltowers dates to the 13th century. The taller belltower, with 19th-century clock, was originally a defensive tower in the city walls. The latest reconstruction removed much of the post-Romanesque additions, including an adjacent nave. The basilica layout has a series of rounded arches, perched on medieval Corinthian columns, flanking the linear central nave, that leads to a series of staircases rising to the altar and apse. The apse once abutted the medieval walls of Viterbo.

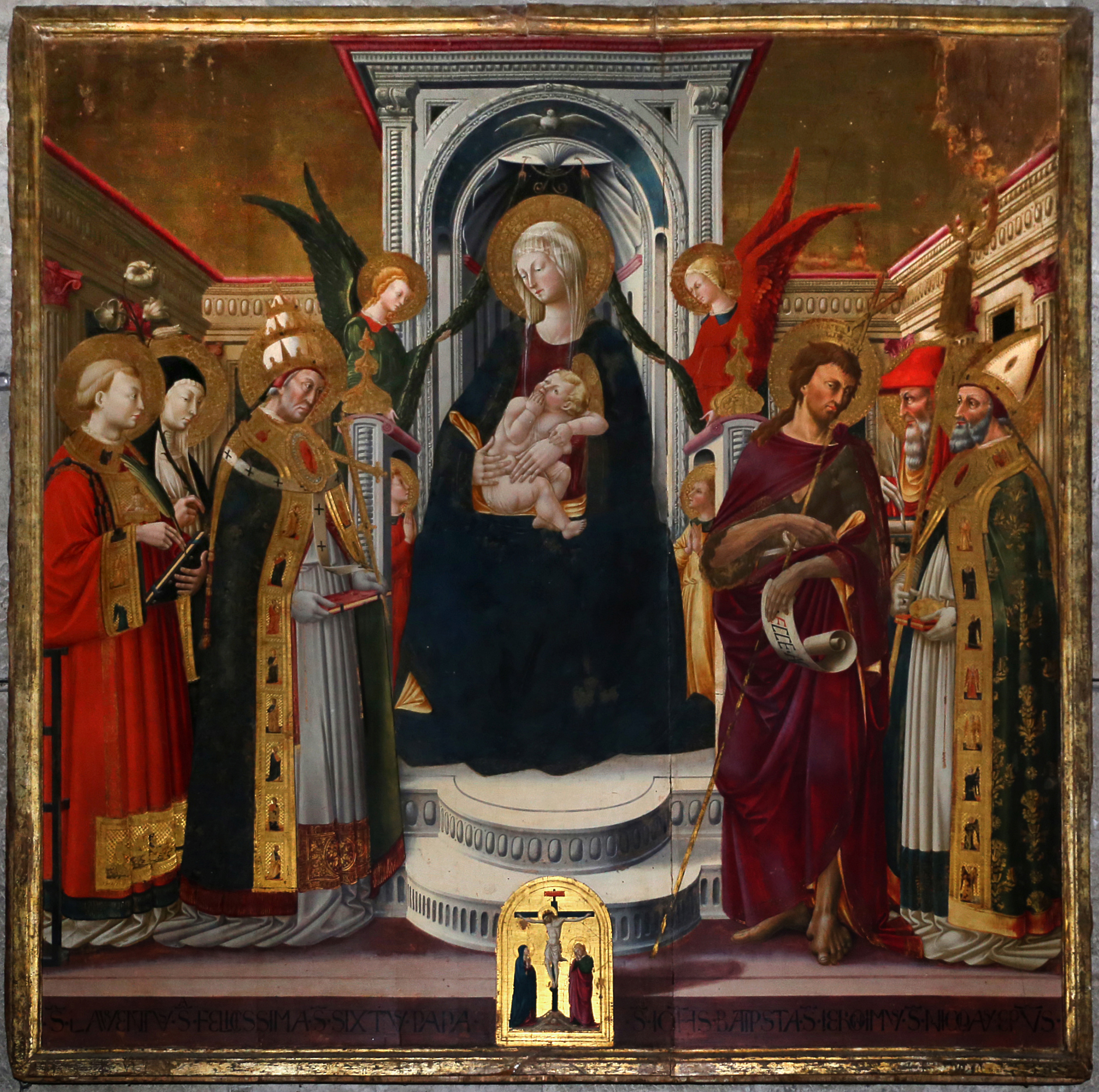
Altarpiece by Neri di Bicci

The interior contains both a font and an altar derived from Roman spolia. The sole internal altarpiece, dated 1441, is a Madonna and Child, with Saints Sixtus, Felicissima, Lawrence, John the Baptist, Jerome and Nicholas. (1457) by Neri di Bicci.
