= Ugolino and His Sons (Carpeaux) =

Marble sculpture

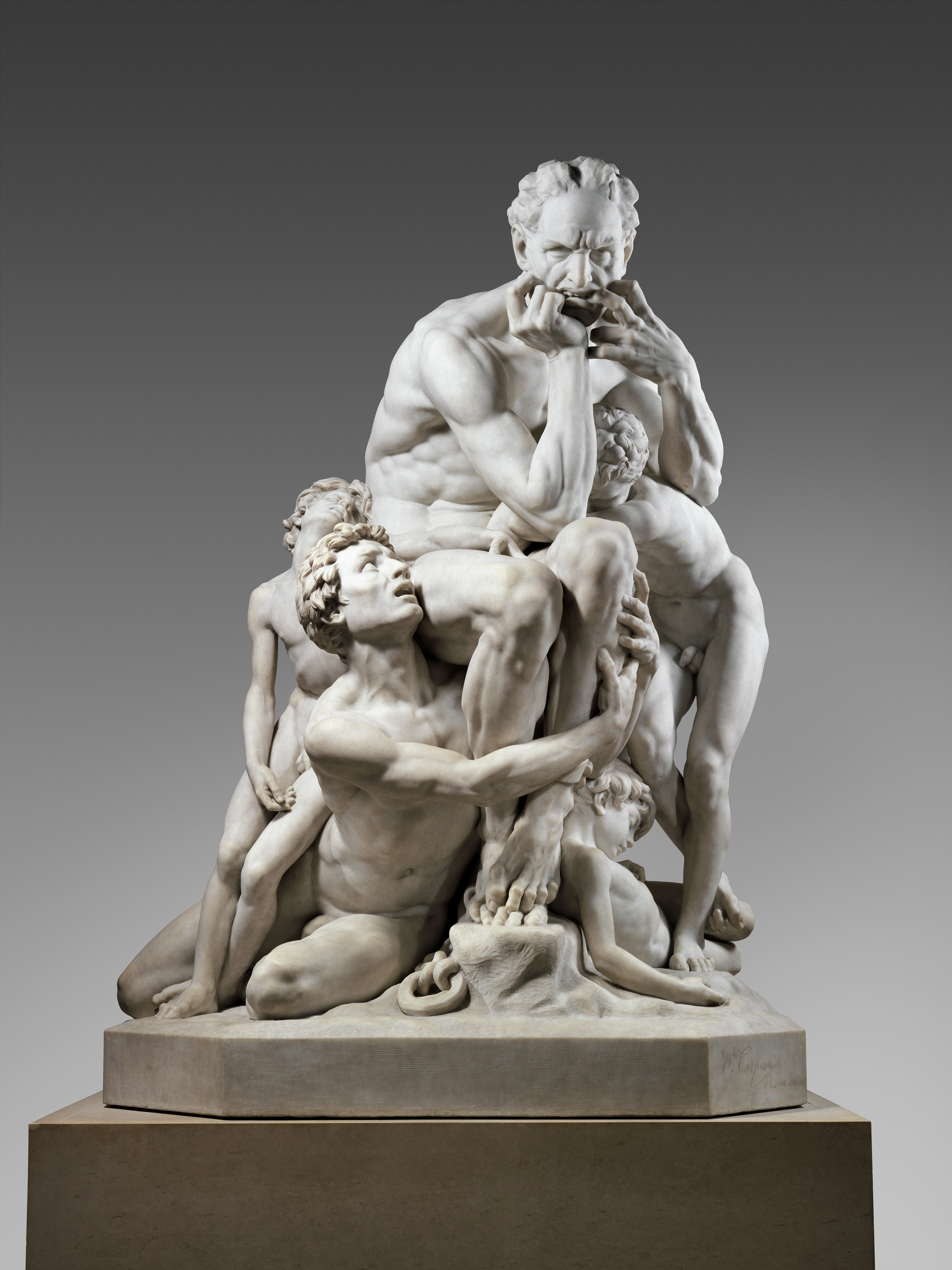
- Artist: Jean-Baptiste Carpeaux

3D model (click to interact)

Ugolino and His Sons is a marble sculpture of Ugolino made by Jean-Baptiste Carpeaux in Paris during the 1860s. It depicts the story of Ugolino from Dante's Inferno in which the 13th century count is imprisoned and starving with his children. The work, known for its expressive detail, launched Carpeaux's career.

== Description and style ==
The work is a highly expressive depiction of Ugolino della Gherardesca from Canto XXXIII of Dante's Inferno. In the story, the Pisan count Ugolino is sentenced to die in a tower prison with his children and grandchildren. Carpeaux shows Ugolino at the moment where he considers cannibalism. The work is emblematic of the Romantic style's heightened physical and emotional states. Ugolino looks into the distance. His posture ignores the four children that cling to his body as if he were unaware they were there—the youngest is curled at his feet and possibly dead. In the source text, Ugolino grieves the agonizing death of his children and whether he eats his children's flesh is unclear to the reader, as it is in the sculpture. Ugolino's body is muscular even though he is starving. Its style reflects the Vatican's Laocoön and His Sons.

== Production ==
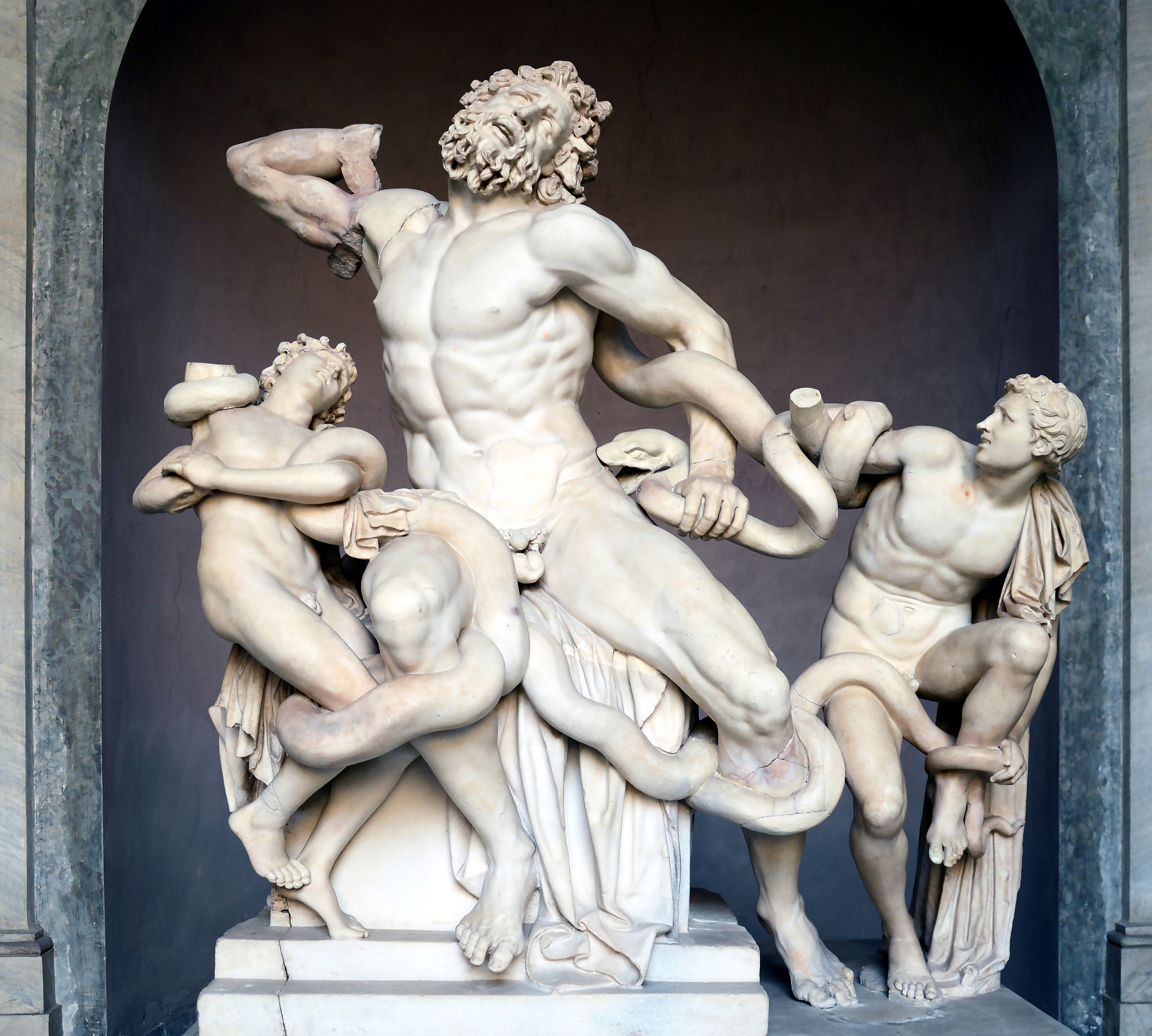
Laocoön and His Sons (1st century BCE) compositionally influenced Carpeaux's Ugolino and His Sons

Carpeaux won the Prix de Rome in 1854. While in Rome, he stayed in the French Academy in Rome's Villa Medici and studied the works of Michelangelo. Carpeaux's Ugolino was prototyped on Michelangelo's works from three centuries prior, particularly his Last Judgment panel of the Sistine Chapel. The children's anatomy was based on naturalistic observation. He sketched dying children as part of his preparation. He was compositionally influenced by Laocoön and His Sons at the Vatican. Carpeaux completed the work in the last year of his residence at the French Academy in Rome.

The sculpture was cast in bronze in 1863 by the French Ministry of Fine Arts and displayed in the Parisian Tuileries to accompany a replica of Laocoön. A marble version was completed in Paris under Carpeaux's supervision for the owner of the Saint-Béat marble quarry to exhibit at the 1867 International Exposition. This version was later acquired by the Metropolitan Museum of Art in New York City.

== Reception ==
The initial release of the plaster model created a "public sensation". Ugolino and His Sons departed from the French Academy's tradition with "boldness and vigor" and the "spirit and masterly technique worthy of Michelangelo". The sculpture, and Carpeaux, were considered descendants of the 1830s French Romantic sculptor tradition associated with François Rude and Auguste Préault. Carpeaux admired the works of Rude, who once served as his mentor. Ugolino and His Sons launched Carpeaux's career and led to his commission for the façade of the Palais Garnier opera house: La Danse, a work that made him famous.

== Legacy ==
Surrealist artist Max Ernst used a woodcut of Ugolino, presumably from the International Exposition's catalog, in his 1929 graphic novel La femme 100 têtes. His collage preserves the terror of Ugolino's face, but juxtaposes it against musical instruments.
