= Tuscia University =

University in Viterbo, Lazio, Italy

Coordinates: 42.4275°N 12.0927°E

- Università degli Studi della Tuscia
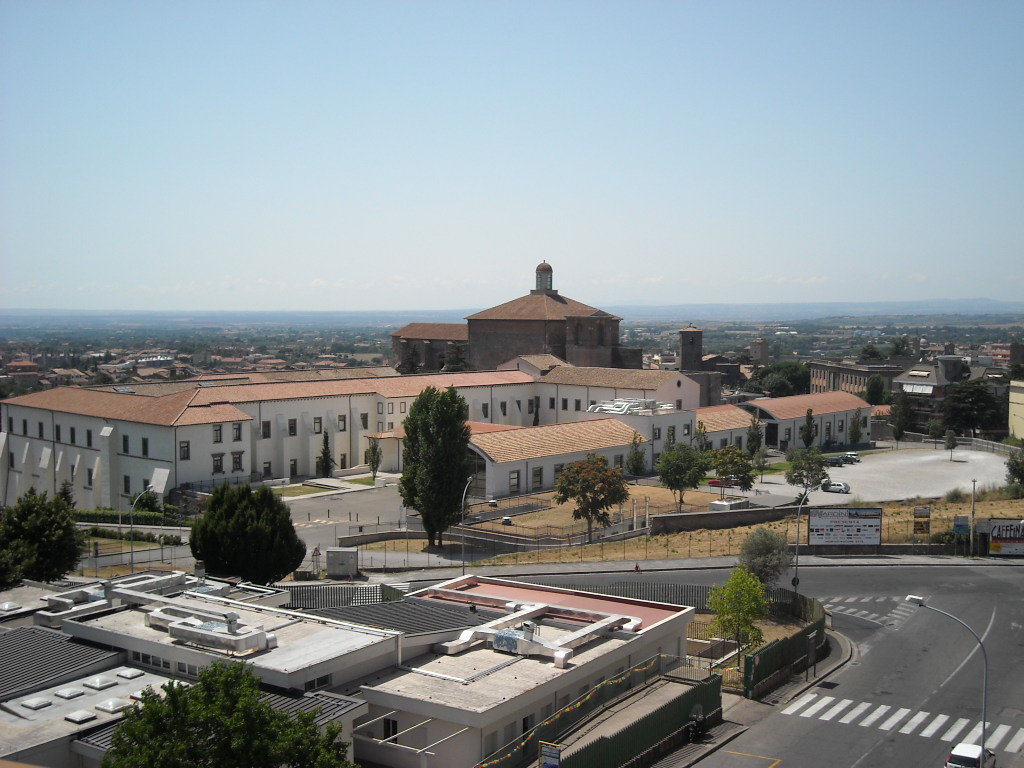
- Type: State-supported
- Established: 1979
- Rector: Prof.ssa Tiziana Laureti
- Students: 8352
- Location: Viterbo, Italy
- Sports teams: CUS Viterbo
- Website: www.unitus.it

University rankings

Global – Overall
- QS World: 851-900 (2026)
- THE World: > 600 (2021)

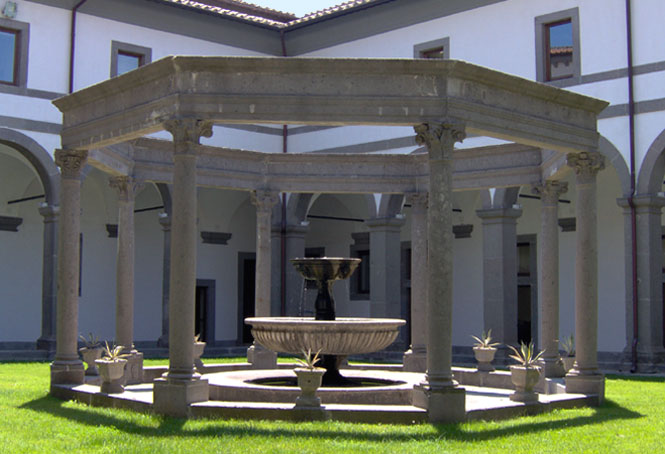
Renaissance cloister at the university rectorate

University of Tuscia (Italian: Università degli Studi della Tuscia, UNITUS) is a university located in the city of Viterbo, Italy. Founded in 1979, the University comprises 6 academic departments. Much of the campus occupies the former monastic complex of Santa Maria in Gradi.

The reference in the University's name to "Tuscia", evokes the term used for a historical region of Italy, centered in recent times upon the city of Viterbo, but which once referred to the far wider territories that in ancient times were under Etruscan influence, and in post-antiquity included what is now the whole region of Tuscany, a great part of Umbria and the northern parts of Lazio. The University's core specialist subject areas reflect in considerable part the current character of the territory which surrounds it. The University conducts its activity in a variety of locations within and around the city.

On 26 February 2019, the President of the Republic of Italy Sergio Mattarella chose to inaugurate the Italian academic year at Tuscia University.

Following words of formal welcome by Marco Frey, president of the Italian Foundation Global Compact Network, the Head of State gave a widely publicized speech, in which he congratulated the University on the progress it had made in many areas of its activity in the forty years since its foundation and offered his encouragement for the future. After the event, Mattarella made a private visit to the Monastery of St. Rose of Viterbo, located in the city.

== Organization ==
The University has seven (7) departments:

- Department of Legal, Social, and Educational Sciences
- Department of Agriculture and Forestry Sciences
- Department of Ecological and Biological Sciences
- Department of Economy, Engineering, Society and Business
- Department of Innovation in Biological, Agro-Food and Forest Systems
- Department of Linguistic, literary, historical, philosophical and legal studies
- Department of Humanities, Communication and Tourism

== See also ==
- List of Italian universities
- Viterbo
- List of forestry universities and colleges
- Orto Botanico dell'Università della Tuscia, the university's botanical garden
