= Well-Tech Award =

The Well-Tech Award, also known as the “WT Award”, is an international award for technological innovation in design coordinated by Well-Tech Architecture & Design Studio in Milan, Italy, in collaboration with "Città metropolitana di Milano" and the Polytechnic University of Milan. The winning projects are selected by a committee of members from the event's sponsors, and the president of Milan Città Metropolitana authorities. The projects are exhibited during the Milan Furniture Fair event, also known as Milan Design Week. The projects represent technological innovation, sustainability, accessibility, and contribution to a quality of life.

== History ==
The Well-Tech Award was the initiative of the founder of Well-Tech Architecture & Design Studio, Chiara Canton, which opened in 1999 in Milan. The purpose of the award is to highlight ecologically sustainable systems that other companies can incorporate into their businesses.

In 2013, Well-Tech also started the Well-Tech SmartCity Award, an international competition focused on urban architecture projects for sustainable development.

== Award Categories ==
Each year, Well-Tech awards prizes in the following three categories:

- Accessibility
- Sustainability
- Quality of Life

Participants may submit up to three entries in each category. Examples of past submissions include ideas ranging from vehicles to home appliances, from clothing to toys, from eco-friendly materials to new forms of renewable energy.

== Evaluation criteria ==
The Well-Tech Award annually selects sixty products that represent the best in technological innovation to improve quality of life, with particular attention to issues of sustainability and accessibility.

=== Accessibility criteria ===
- easy to use by vulnerable groups, elderly and disabled
- secure visibility and easy understanding of the components
- research and application of new ways to use products and services
- qualitative values, functional and communicative of the product

=== Sustainability criteria ===
- Reduce consumption of materials and energy
- Reduce waste throughout the life cycle of the product
- Application of renewable energies and materials
- Transformation of the mode of consumption as a function of reduced materials and energy
- Continued investment and not just an episodic company on the content of sustainable development
- Qualitative values functional and communicative of the product

=== Quality of Life criteria ===
- Applications of ergonomic parameters of materials and technologies that reduce the environmental impact
- Applications of materials and technologies to optimize user comfort
- Communicative product able to establish a relationship of empathy with the user
- Appropriate use of materials and technology in the production system

== Well–Tech Award Event ==
Each year, top products and projects submitted are showcased during the Milan Design Week. The event is organized by Well-Tech Architecture & Design Studio in collaboration with Milano Città Metropolitana. Each of the three categories has one first-place winner. In addition, up to six honorable mentions may be awarded.

== Well-Tech Award winners ==
The following table show the category of the winning award, the company, institution or individual that designed the product, and the winning product.

Year	Winners	Honorable Mentions
2018	Accessibility: Whill - Whill Wheelchair; Sustainability: Tenax International - Electra 2.0 NEO; Quality of life: Smart Street - Salva Pedone	Accessibility: Wallcovering Pubblicità - TrialSystem; Accessibility: Spark Design & Innovation - Lea-Care Robot; Sustainability: Nieder - Wavin Metal; Sustainability: Epson Italia - EcoTank and Rips Printers; Quality of life: De'Longhi Appliances - Air Purifier, heater, cooling fan
2016	Accessibility: Maxime Dubreucq and Robert Provó Kluit - Trompe; Sustainability: Arturo Vittori - Warka Water Tower; Quality of life: Julian Melchiorri - The Silk Leaf	Accessibility: Alec Momont - Ambulance drone; Sustainability: Donal Vitez - Robo-Washer Revolution; Quality of Life: Jordane Vernet - Steribox
2014	Accessibility: Genny Mobility - Genny™ 2.0 Urban; Quality of life: Robot Era Project - Robot Era system; Sustainability: SafetyNet Technologies - Safety Net	Accessibility: Morph wheels - Morph Folding Wheelchair Wheel; Sustainability: Electric Mobility Company, S.L. - Xkuty One; Quality of Life: iCub team - iCub; Accessibility: Wheeldesign - Kigali Chair Project; Sustainability: Schreder - Perla LED Lamp
2013	Accessibility: Design Research Lab in Germany - Tom Bieling, Ulrike Gollner - Mobile Lorm Glove; Sustainability: V3 Solar - V3 Solar Spin Cell; Quality of life: Water Sheer - Sulis PPD	Accessibility: Lau Shuk Man - Reach & Match; Sustainability: Peter Horvàth – Biolamp; Quality of Life: Lana Agiyan - Bubble Baby Bed; Accessibility: RSL Steeper - Bebionic 3; Sustainability: Bombardier - Flexity 2; Quality of Life: O'Sun - Alain Gilles - Nomad
2012	Accessibility: Todd Kuiken and the Rehabilitation Institute of Chicago (RIC) - TMR; Sustainability: School of Design, Hunan University - Oil Cleaning Guard; Quality of life: True Energy Group - Sure Chill	Accessibility: Continuum - Leverage Freedom Chair; Sustainability: Smart - E-Bike; Quality of life: Gabriele Diamanti - Eliodomestico; Quality of Life: Embrace - Transport Infant Warmer
2011	Accessibility: Roadrunnerfoot Engineering - Walking MP Foot; Sustainability: Japan Science and Technology - Elastic Water; Quality of life: ThermaHelm Crash Helmet Limited - Halo Helmet	Accessibility: Tarta Design - Tarta; Sustainability: LAVA - Masdar City; Quality of Life: Politecnico di Milano, IPSIA “A. Ferrari” Maranello-Fabrizio Ceschin - MULO System; Accessibility: Aviya Serfaty - Outfeet; Sustainability: Rem - Stilo; Quality of Life: Lamiflex - Luca Schieppati design - Ciclotte
2010	Accessibility: Frogdesign - Masiluleke Home HIV Test Project: "I know my status"; Sustainability: Luxim Corporation - LiFi; Quality of life: Julene Aguirre Bielschowsky Design - Sun Station	Accessibility: Samsung Design - Touch Sight; Sustainability: Habitare Art Design Srl – Egg (Ovetto); Quality of Life: Mitsubishi Motors Corporation - I-MIEV
2009	Accessibility: Sungwoo Park - Voice Stick; Sustainability: Brand Image - Paper Bottle; Quality of life: Philips Design - Off the Grid: Sustainable Habitat 2020	Accessibility: Charles A. Blatchford - KX06; Sustainability: Oppent - Automatic waste system; Quality of Life: Magneti Marelli - Eco Navigation; Sustainability: Emker - BioWashBall
2008	Accessibility: Spidi Sport - DPS 03 Airbag; Sustainability: Pelamis Wave Power - Pelamis Wave Energy Converter; Quality of life: Q-Drum - Q-DRUM	Accessibility: Associazione Nazionale Subvedenti - RoboBraille; Sustainability: Artemide - Solar tree; Quality of Life: Alberto Meda - Francisco Gomez Paz - Solar Bottle; Accessibility: Centro Ricerche Fiat; Sustainability: Ariostea
2007	Accessibility: CRIM Lab - EMILOC; Sustainability: Global Photonic Energy Corporation - Organic Photovoltaics Technology; Quality of life: d30 Lab - D30 Technology	Accessibility: Landscape Structures - Accessible Superscoop; Sustainability: Citroen - C3 1.4 BI ENERGY M; Quality of Life: Parans Daylight - PARANS; Accessibility: g.tec Medical Engineering - g.BCIsys; Sustainability: Invent - B.& C. - TECH-TILE; Quality of Life: Fiat Group
2006	Accessibility: Optobionics Corporation - ASR Device; Sustainability: Konarka-Evident - Ultra High Performance Power Plastic; Quality of life: Vestergaard Frandsen - Life Straw	Sustainability: Vectrix Corporation - Vectrix Electric; Quality of Life: Axana - GIOEL401; Quality of Life: Trerè Innovation - X-Bionic Undergear; Accessibility: Johnson & Johnson Medical - Embrace heart stabilizer; Sustainability: Citroen Italia - C3 Stop & Start; Quality of Life: Theben - Ramses 820 Kristall® top
