= RoboBraille =

Web and email service

RoboBraille is a web and email service capable of converting documents into a range of accessible formats including Braille, mp3, e-books and Daisy. The service can furthermore be used to convert otherwise inaccessible documents such as scanned images and pdf files into more accessible formats. RoboBraille has been in operation since 2004 and currently serves thousands of user requests each month from users around the world. The service is available for free for strictly individual, non-commercial use. Institutional use by academic institutions is available through SensusAccess.

The RoboBraille service is developed jointly by the National Danish Center for Visual Impairment for Children and Youth and Sensus ApS. RoboBraille is available free of charge for individual, non-commercial users and users need not register to use the service. Commercial use in any form is prohibited. The development and operation of RoboBraille has been funded by the Danish Government, the European Commission and private foundations. Many organisations have contributed to the development of the RoboBraille service including Royal National College for the Blind based in Hereford, United Kingdom, St Joseph's School for the Blind, Ireland, the National Council for the Blind of Ireland, Irish Republic, Associazione Nazionale Subvedenti, Italy, CIDEF, Portugal, Hilfsgemeinschaft der Blinden und Sehschwachen Österreichs, Austria, Medison, Poland, The Lithuanian Association of the Blind and Visually Handicapped, Lithuania, Association Valentin Haüy, France, and the Pancyprian Organization of the Blind, Cyprus.

In November 2012, the RoboBraille service received the WISE 2012 award from Qatar Foundation in recognition of its contribution to inclusive and barrier-free education. In January 2010, the RoboBraille services received the prestigious BETT Award. The service has previously received the BETT Award for best Special Education Needs solution (2010), Access IT Award for Learning for most affordable eLearning solution (2009), The National eWell-Being Award for ”Reaching the Digitally Excluded” (2009), the European Commission eInclusion Award for e-Accessibility Award (2008), the Well-Tech Award for Innovation and Accessibility (2008) and the British Computer Society's Social Contribution Award (2007).

RoboBraille offers four main categories of services:

1. Braille services: Translation to and from Braille (contracted, un-contracted) in Bulgarian, Danish, British English, American English, Hungarian, Italian, French, Greek, German, Icelandic, Norwegian, Polish, Portuguese, Romanian and Spanish. Supported document types include text files (DOS and Windows), Microsoft Word documents (doc, docx, Word xml), HTML documents, rtf files, tiff, gif, jpg, bmp, pcx, dcx, j2k, jp2, jpx, djv and all types of pdf documents. Before the Braille document is returned to the user, it may be converted to a particular Braille character set based on user settings. Documents can also be returned in Unicode Braille or formatted in either text format or PEF (Portable Embosser Format).
2. Audio services: All document types listed in the previous section may be converted into mp3 files. Furthermore, RoboBraille is capable of converting well-structured Word documents (doc, docx, xml) into Daisy Talking Books complete with audio. Similarly, RoboBraille can convert docx documents containing math (composed in MathType) into Daisy books with spoken math. The audio conversion services currently include high-quality voices for the following languages: Arabic, Arabic/English bilingual, Bulgarian, Danish, Dutch (male, female), English/American, English/British, French, German, Greenlandic, Hungarian, Icelandic, Italian, Lithuanian, Polish, Portuguese, Romanian, Russian, Slovenian Spanish/Castilian and Spanish/Latin American.
3. E-Book services: Most document types listed above may be converted into the popular EPUB and Mobi Pocket (Amazon Kindle) e-book formats. The service also supports conversion of documents into the EPUB3 format, including EPUB3 books with media overlay. Furthermore, EPUB may be converted to Mobi Pocket and vice versa. To accommodate users with low vision, the base line of the body text in an e-book may be raised to allow for more appropriate text scaling in mainstream e-book readers.
4. Accessibility services: Otherwise inaccessible documents such as image files in gif, tiff, jpg, bmp, pcx, dcx, j2k, jp2, jpx, djv and image-only pdf, as well as all types of pdf files can be converted to more accessible formats including tagged pdf, doc, docx, Word xml, xls, xlsx, csv, text, rtf and html. Word and rtf files are converted into text or tagged pdf files subject to the format specified by the user in the subject line, e.g., txt or pdf. PowerPoint files are converted into tagged pdf, web projects or rtf files.

In addition to the traditional email-interface, RoboBraille is available via the web form at http://www.robobraille.org/.

== History ==
RoboBraille was invented in 2004 by Lars Ballieu Christensen, a computer scientist and social entrepreneur, and Svend Thougaard, an alternate media specialist. The system was developed in Denmark with the assistance of the Royal National College for the Blind based in Hereford, United Kingdom. The system was launched in June 2006 and was the winner of a British Computer Society Social Contribution Project Award in 2007.
