= Fontana di Santa Maria in Poggio =

Fountain in Viterbo

Coordinates: 42.41933°N 12.10820°E

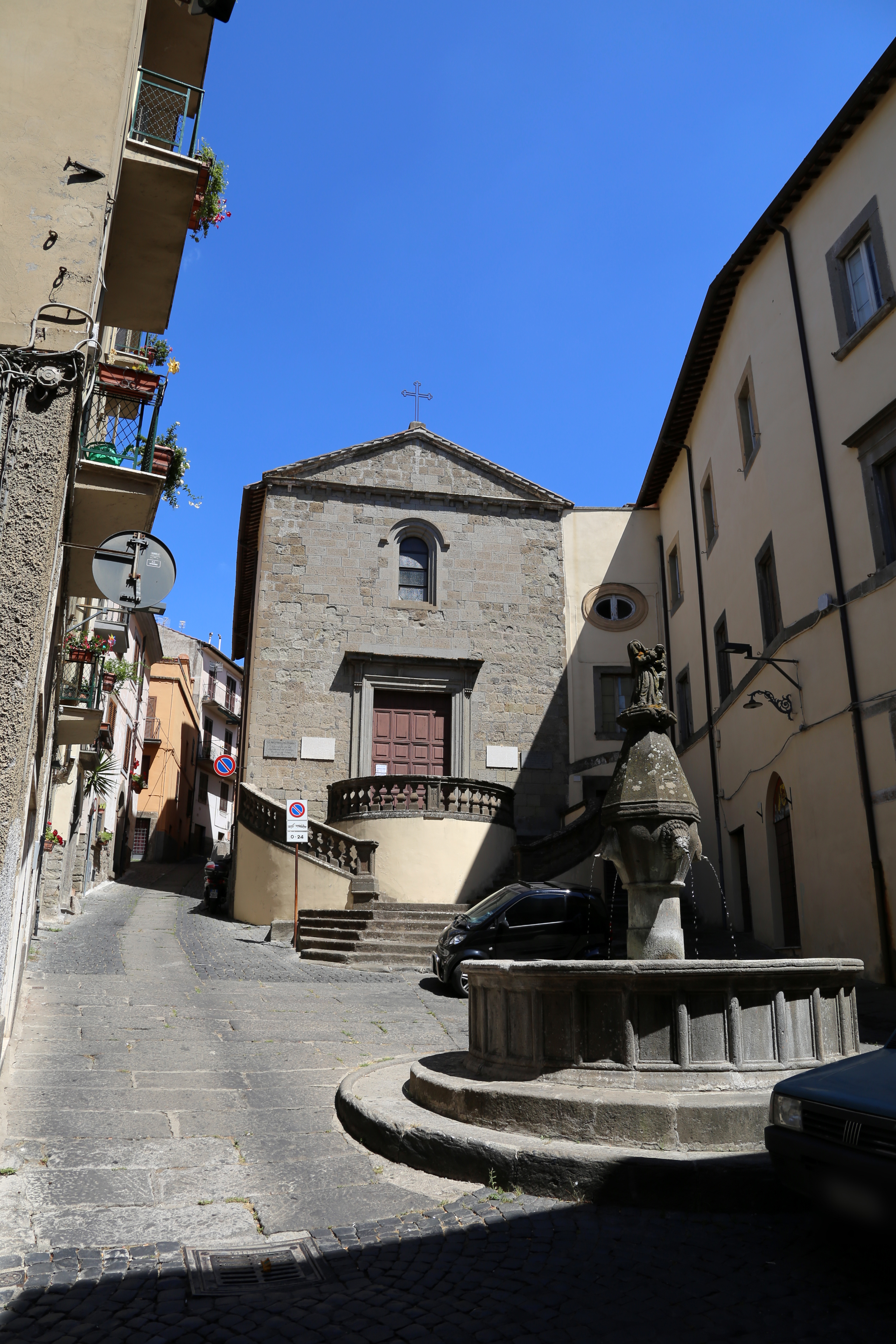
Fountain in fore, with church in the background

The Fontana di Santa Maria in Poggio, also called the Fontana della Crocetta or Fontana di Santa Rosa, is a medieval fountain located Piazza della Crocetta, in front of the parish church of Santa Maria in Poggio, in the historic center of Viterbo, region of Lazio, Italy.

A fountain was erected at this site by the early 13th-century, since legend recalls that a fountain was present during the lifetime of St Rose of Viterbo. The church in this piazza was Rose's parish church, and where she remained buried from 1252 to 1258, when she was translocated to the Monastery of Santa Rosa. The small sculpture at the pinnacle of the central spire depicts that putative event where a small girl seeking to fill a pitcher of water, broke the ceramic pitcher, and received a stern reprimand. It is said that Rose comforted the child and miraculously stitched together the broken pitcher. Also in the central spire are heads of a man and a woman and two lions, the latter symbols of Viterbo found in other fountains in town, serving as spigots that pour water into the circular basin.
