= Andreas Vogler =

Swiss architect, designer and artist

- Born: January 15, 1964 (age 62); Basel, Switzerland
- Occupation: Architect
- Awards: Red Dot Award, iF Design Award, German Design Award
- Practice: Andreas Vogler Studio
- Projects: DesertSeal extreme environment tent, 2004 WarkaWater, Venice Biennale, 2012 Aeroliner3000, Tomorrow's Train Design Today finalist, 2015

Andreas Vogler (born January 15, 1964) is a Swiss architect, designer and artist. He is founder and director of the architecture and design firm Andreas Vogler Studio.

== Early life ==
Andreas Vogler was raised in Basel, Switzerland. After several semesters of studies in Art History and Literature, Vogler worked as an interior designer with Alinea AG in Basel. In 1988–1994, he studied architecture at the Swiss Federal Institute of Technology (Eidgenössische Technische Hochschule) in Zurich spending one exchange semester at the Rhode Island School of Design in Providence (RISD) in the United States and graduated with a diploma project for an energy-independent, pre-fabricated Weather Station on the Weissfluhjoch/Arosa.

== Career ==
In 1995, he worked for Ingenhoven Architects in Düsseldorf, and from 1995 to 1996 for Richard Horden Associates, now known as Horden Cherry Lee Architects, in London. Later, he became teaching and research assistant at the institute of Professor Richard Horden at the Technical University of Munich until 2002. There he was teaching microarchitecture and initiated and leading several design studios for aerospace architecture, focusing on habitability on board the International Space Station, and on studies for future habitats on Mars together with the National Aeronautics and Space Administration NASA. The students involved were able to test their prototypes in parabolic test flights at NASA Johnson Space Center. During the time at the Technical University of Munich, Vogler published several papers about space architecture and submitted several prize-winning architectural competition entries. In 2003–2005, he worked as guest professor at The Royal Danish Academy of Fine Arts, School of Architecture in Copenhagen conducting research on prefabricated housing. In 2004, he taught at The University of Hong Kong. In 2005- 2006, he was part of the Concept House research group at the Delft University of Technology.

Vogler has spoken at numerous international conferences on the topics of aerospace architecture and technology transfer to architecture and sustainability in architecture. He organized international conference sessions and led workshops on a variety of related themes. In 2008, he and Vittori taught an undergraduate course in Industrial Design at the University of Rome La Sapienza and the University Iuav of Venice. He is a member of the Bavarian Chamber of Architects (ByAK- Bayerische Architektenkammer), the Deutscher Werkbund, and the American Institute of Aeronautics and Astronautics.

== Architecture and Vision ==
In 2002, Vogler started to collaborate with the Italian architect, Arturo Vittori, with whom he founded in 2003 Architecture and Vision, an international and multidisciplinary studio working in architecture and design. Both engaged in the development of innovative solutions and technology transfer between diverse fields for aerospace and terrestrial applications. In 2006, a prototype of the extreme environment tent, DesertSeal (2004), became part of the permanent collection of The Museum of Modern Art in New York, after being featured in SAFE: Design Takes on Risk (2005), curated by Paola Antonelli. In the same year, the Museum of Science and Industry Chicago selected Vogler and Vittori as "Modern-day Leonardo's" for its Leonardo da Vinci: Man, Inventor, Genius exhibition. In 2007, a model of the inflatable habitat MoonBaseTwo (2007), developed to allow long-term exploration on the Moon, was acquired for the collection of the Museum of Science and Industry Chicago in Chicago while MarsCruiserOne (2007), the design for a pressurized laboratory rover for human Mars exploration, was shown at the Centre Georges Pompidou in Paris, as part of the exhibition "Airs de Paris" (2007). In 2011, the sculpture AtlasCoelestisZeroG was inaugurated on board of the International Space Station.

== Andreas Vogler Studio ==
In January 2014, Vogler formed the Andreas Vogler Studio, an international and multidisciplinary firm working in architecture, transportation, and design, located in Munich, Germany. Andreas Vogler Studio participated in the GB Railway's "Tomorrow's Train Design Today" transportation competition, and was named a finalist on April 8, 2015. AEROLINER 3000 follows the consequent application of lightweight thinking into the train world. The development of a combination of many singular elements concerning aerodynamics, locomotion, structure, interactive control systems and even passenger psychology will be orchestrated under the umbrella of a modern design and engineering culture informed by consequent lightweight thinking. The design received several design awards.

== Projects ==
2018

- Design Thinking Workshop for Train Seats

2017

- Designs for Cleaning Devices
- Private Apartment in Berlin

2016

- Aeroliner3000 Demonstrator phase.
- Swiss Residence Munich
- Interiors for Swiss Club Munich

2015

- Aeroliner3000 Feasibility Study
- Swiss-A-Loo
- EyeInTheSky – Electronic Sculpture for ArsTechnica

2014

- "Aeroliner3000", finalist Tomorrow's Train Design Today, 2014–2016 (ongoing project), UK
- "SwissConsulate", Swiss Consulate, Munich, Germany

2013

- OR of the Future, UIC, Chicago, United States

2012

- WarkaWater, Venice Biennale, Venice, Italy

2011

- LaFenice, Messina, Sicily, Italy
- AtlasCoelestisZeroG, International Space Station
- Corsair International, Paris, France

2009

- AtlasCoelestis, Sullivan Galleries, Chicago, Illinois
- MercuryHouseOne, Venice Biennale, Venice, Italy
- FioredelCielo, Macchina di Santa Rosa, Viterbo, Italy

2007

- BirdHouse, Bird House Foundation, Osaka, Japan

2006

- DesertSeal, permanent collection, Museum of Modern Art (MOMA), New York City

== Selected exhibitions ==
2015

- EyeInTheSky, ArsTechnica2015, Unterhaching, Germany, May 15–17, 2015

2013

- From Pyramids to Spacecraft, traveling exhibition
- Children Museum Heliopolis, Cairo, Egypt, February 21 – April 25, 2013
- Parliament Bucharest, ROCAD, Bucharest, Romania, May 15–19, 2013
- Futuro Textiles, Cité des Sciences et de l’Industrie, Paris, France, February 6 – September 30

2012

- From Pyramids to Spacecraft, traveling exhibition
- Italian Cultural Institute, Hamburg, Germany, March 28 – April 4, 2012
- Robert A. Deshon and Karl J. Schlachter Library for Design, Architecture, Art, and Planning (DAAP), University of Cincinnati, Cincinnati, USA, April 20 – May 11, 2012
- Istituto Italiano di Cultura, Addis Ababa, Ethiopia, May 11–25, 2012
- American University, Cairo, Egypt, November 19–26, 2012
- The New Library of Alexandria, Alexandria, Egypt, November 29 – January 15, 2013
- Born out of Necessity, MoMA The Museum of Modern Art, New York, USA, March 2, 2012 – January 28, 2013
- AtlasCoelestisZero, Istituto Italiano di Cultura, San Francisco, USA, April 17 – May 1, 2012
- WarkaWater, Palazzo Bembo, 13th Int. Architecture Biennale Venice, Italy, August 29 – November 25, 2012

2011

- From Pyramids to Spacecraft, traveling exhibition, Beihang Art Gallery, Beijing, China, March 21–31, 2011
- Shanghai Science and Technology Festival, Pudong Expo, Shanghai, China, May 13–22, 2011
- Living – Frontiers of Architecture III-IV, Louisiana Museum, Humlebaek, Denmark, June 1 – October 2, 2011

2010

- From Pyramids to Spacecraft, traveling exhibition The Goldstein Museum of Design, Minneapolis, Minnesota, USA, March 14 – May 2, 2010
- Italian Cultural Institute Tokyo, Japan, June 21 – July 3, 2010
- Great Lakes Science Center, Cleveland, Ohio, US, October 15 – January 13, 2011
- Deutscher Pavillon, Architecture Biennale Venice, Italy, August 25 – November 21, 2010

2009

- From Pyramids to Spacecraft, traveling exhibition: Italian Cultural Institute, Chicago, Illinois, United States, March 13 – April 22,
- Swissnex, San Francisco, California, United States, April 30 – May 20
- Seoul Design Olympiad 2009, Seoul, Korea, October 9–29
- MercuryHouseOne, 53rd Art Biennale Venice San Servolo Island, Venice, Italy, September 2 – October 20,
- FioredelCielo, Palazzo Orsini, Bomarzo, Italy, September 5 – September 7,
- ACADIA, School of the Art Institute Chicago, US, September 25 – January 9, 2010

2008

- Fifteen Roman Architects, New Challenges for the City of Tomorrow, come se Gallery, Rome, Italy, March 14–30
- Le Città del Futuro (Cities of Tomorrow), Parco della Musica, Rome, Italy, March 1,

2007

- 2057, l’espace des 50 prochaines années, Cité de l’Espace, Toulouse, France, November 27 – February 4, 2008
- Istanbul Design Week 2007, Istanbul, Turkey, September 4–10
- Air de Paris, Centre Pompidou, Paris, France, April 25 – August 15

2006

- FuturoTextiles, Tri Postal, Lille, France, November 14 – January 14, 2007
- Abenteuer Raumfahrt, Landesmuseum für Technik und Arbeit, Mannheim, Germany, September 28 – April 9, 2007
- Leonardo: Man, Inventor, Genius, Modern-day Leonardos, The Museum of Science and Industry, Chicago, USA, June 14 – Sept 4

2005

- SAFE: Design Takes on Risk, The Museum of Modern Art, New York, United States, November 16 – January 2, 2006

== Bibliography ==
- Paola Antonelli (ed.), Safe: Design Takes on Risk, The Museum of Modern Art, New York 2005, p. 64. ISBN 0-87070-580-6
- Valérie Guillaume, architecture + vision. Mars Cruiser One 2002–2006, in Airs de Paris, Diffusion Union-Distribution, Paris 2007, pp. 338–339. ISBN 978-2-84426-325-4
- Namita Goel, The Beauty of the Extreme, Indian Architect & Builder, March 2006, pp. 82–83.
- Arturo Vittori, Architecture and Vision, in L'Arca, October 2004, 196, pp. 26–38.
- Un veicolo per Marte. Mars Cruiser One, in L'Arca, April 2007, 224, p. 91.
- Ruth Slavid, Micro: Very Small Buildings, Laurence King Publishing, London, pp. 102–106, ISBN 978-1-85669-495-7
- Wüstenzelt Desert Seal / Desert Seal Tent, in Detail, 2008, 6, pp. 612–614
- Maurizio Vitta, Le belle arti sono industriale, in L'Arca, 2012, No106, pp. 22–29
- Arena di Verona, in L'Arca, 2017, 138 p. 86.
