= Arturo Vittori =

Italian architect and designer

- Born: Arturo Vittori; 1 October 1971; Viterbo, Italy
- Occupations: Architect, Designer and Artist
- Practice: Architecture and Vision, Warka Water
- Buildings: Warka Tower
- Projects: Warka Village

Arturo Vittori (born October 1, 1971, in Viterbo, Italy), is an Italian artist, architect, and industrial designer. He is co-founder and director of the architecture and design team Architecture and Vision.

== Biography ==
Arturo Vittori was raised in Bomarzo, Italy. From 1989 to 1993 Vittori studied Fine Arts in Viterbo and in 1993 he began to study architecture at the University of Florence, where, after a two-year experience at the Darmstadt University of Technology in Germany, he graduated in 1996 with an award-winning thesis project entitled “International Space Station: Travelling Network.” In 1997 he did his Master in ‘Technician in Architectural Diagnostic’ in Modena. After that he gained experience collaborating with architects such as Jourda Architects in 1997, Duepiù France in 1998, Santiago Calatrava in 2000 and Jean Nouvel in 2001. In 2002–2004 he was Manager of Cabin Design at Airbus in Toulouse, participating in the interior cabin design for a variety of airline companies and in particular for the A380, currently the largest existing airliner. In 2005 he worked with Future Systems in London, collaborating with Anish Kapoor in the design of the Monte Sant’Angelo subway station in Naples and in 2006 he practiced yacht design at the London-based studio of Francis Design.

In 2003 Vittori co-founded, with the Swiss architect Andreas Vogler co-founded Architecture and Vision, an international and multidisciplinary studio working in architecture and design, engaged in the development of innovative solutions and technology transfer between diverse fields for aerospace and terrestrial applications. In 2006, a prototype of the extreme environment tent, DesertSeal (2004), became part of the permanent collection of The Museum of Modern Art in New York, after being featured in SAFE: Design Takes on Risk (2005), curated by Paola Antonelli. In the same year, the Museum of Science and Industry Chicago selected Vogler and Vittori as “Modern-day Leonardos” for its Leonardo da Vinci: Man, Inventor, Genius exhibition. In 2007, a model of the inflatable habitat MoonBaseTwo (2007), developed to allow long-term exploration on the Moon, was acquired for the collection of the Museum of Science and Industry Chicago while MarsCruiserOne (2007), the design for a pressurized laboratory rover for human Mars exploration, was shown at the Centre Georges Pompidou in Paris, as part of the exhibition “Airs de Paris” (2007).

Architecture and Vision has realized several transdisciplinary projects in aerospace, architecture and art. Their work is shown in the traveling exhibition named “From Pyramids to Spacecraft”. Vittori has spoken at numerous international conferences on the topics of aerospace architecture, technology transfer to architecture, sustainability and art.

After 10 years of collaboration Andreas Vogler departed Architecture and Vision to found his own private firm Andreas Vogler Studio.

== Projects ==
2015

- Warka Water 3.2, Dorze, Ethiopia

2013

- OR of the Future, UIC, Chicago, United States

2012

- WarkaWater, Venice Biennale, Venice, Italy

2011

- LaFenice, Messina, Sicily, Italy
- AtlasCoelestisZeroG, International Space Station
- Corsair International, Paris, France

2009

- AtlasCoelestis, Sullivan Galleries, Chicago, Illinois
- MercuryHouseOne, Venice Biennale, Venice, Italy
- FioredelCielo, Macchina di Santa Rosa, Viterbo, Italy

2007

- BirdHouse, Bird House Foundation, Osaka, Japan

2006

- DesertSeal, permanent collection, Museum of Modern Art (MOMA), New York

== Teaching ==
- IUAV, University of Venice, Venice, Italy, 2008 – 2012
- Illinois Institute of Technology (IIT), Chicago, Illinois, 2009
- Sapienza University of Rome, Rome, Italy, 2007

== Selected exhibitions ==
2013

- From Pyramids to Spacecraft, traveling exhibition
- Children Museum Heliopolis, Cairo, Egypt, February 21 – April 25, 2013
- Parliament Bucharest, ROCAD, Bucharest, Romania, May 15–19, 2013
- Futuro Textiles, Cité des Sciences et de l’Industrie, Paris, France, February 6 – September 30

2012

- From Pyramids to Spacecraft, traveling exhibition
- Italian Cultural Institute, Hamburg, Germany, March 28 – April 4, 2012
- Robert A. Deshon and Karl J. Schlachter Library for Design, Architecture, Art, and Planning (DAAP), University of Cincinnati, Cincinnati, USA, April 20 – May 11, 2012
- Istituto Italiano di Cultura, Addis Ababa, Ethiopia, May 11–25, 2012
- American University, Cairo, Egypt, November 19–26, 2012
- The New Library of Alexandria, Alexandria, Egypt, November 29 – January 15, 2013
- Born out of Necessity, MoMA The Museum of Modern Art, New York, US, March 2, 2012 – January 28, 2013
- AtlasCoelestisZero, Istituto Italiano di Cultura, San Francisco, US, April 17 – May 1, 2012
- WarkaWater, Palazzo Bembo, 13th Int. Architecture Biennale Venice, Italy, August 29 – November 25, 2012

2011

- From Pyramids to Spacecraft, traveling exhibition, Beihang Art Gallery, Beijing, China, March 21–31, 2011
- Shanghai Science and Technology Festival, Pudong Expo, Shanghai, China, May 13–22, 2011
- Living – Frontiers of Architecture III-IV, Louisiana Museum, Humlebaek, Denmark, June 1 – October 2, 2011

2010

- From Pyramids to Spacecraft, traveling exhibition The Goldstein Museum of Design, Minneapolis, Minnesota, USA, March 14 – May 2, 2010
- Italian Cultural Institute Tokyo, Japan, June 21 – July 3, 2010
- Great Lakes Science Center, Cleveland, Ohio, USA, October 15 – January 13, 2011
- Deutscher Pavillon, Architecture Biennale Venice, Italy, August 25 – November 21, 2010

2009

- From Pyramids to Spacecraft, traveling exhibition: Italian Cultural Institute, Chicago, Illinois, United States, March 13 – April 22,
- Swissnex, San Francisco, California, United States, April 30 – May 20
- Seoul Design Olympiad 2009, Seoul, Korea, October 9–29
- MercuryHouseOne, 53rd Art Biennale Venice San Servolo Island, Venice, Italy, September 2 – October 20,
- FioredelCielo, Palazzo Orsini, Bomarzo, Italy, September 5 – September 7,
- ACADIA, School of the Art Institute Chicago, USA, September 25 – January 9, 2010

2008

- Fifteen Roman Architects, New Challenges for the City of Tomorrow, come se Gallery, Rome, Italy, March 14–30
- Le Città del Futuro (Cities of Tomorrow), Parco della Musica, Rome, Italy, March 1,

2007

- 2057, l’espace des 50 prochaines années, Cité de l’Espace, Toulouse, France, November 27 – February 4, 2008
- Istanbul Design Week 2007, Istanbul, Turkey, September 4–10
- Air de Paris, Centre Pompidou, Paris, France, April 25 – August 15

2006

- FuturoTextiles, Tri Postal, Lille, France, November 14 – January 14, 2007
- Abenteuer Raumfahrt, Landesmuseum für Technik und Arbeit, Mannheim, Germany, September 28 – April 9, 2007
- Leonardo: Man, Inventor, Genius, Modern-day Leonardos, The Museum of Science and Industry, Chicago, USA, June 14 – Sept 4

2005

- SAFE: Design Takes on Risk, The Museum of Modern Art, New York, United States, November 16 – January 2, 2006

== Awards ==
2016

- 2015–2016 World Design Impact Prize for the Warka Water project, 18.03.2016, Taipei, Taiwan.
