= Macchina di Santa Rosa =

Perennially rebuilt tower in Viterbo, Italy

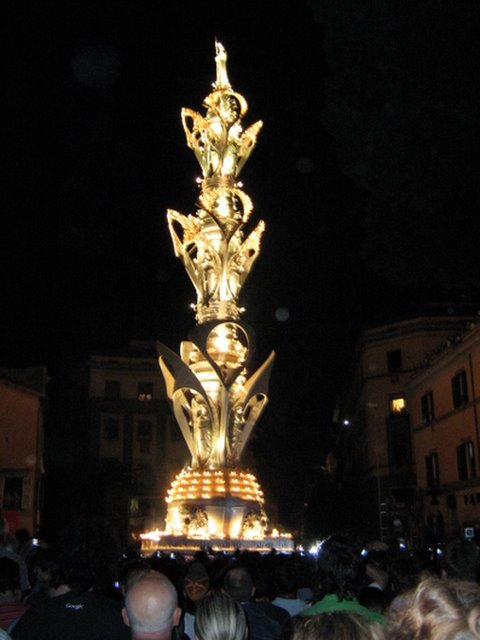
- Ali di luce (2007)
- Genre: Procession
- Date: 3 September
- Frequency: Annual
- Locations: Viterbo, Italy
- Inaugurated: 1258

Celebrations of big shoulder-borne processional structures
- UNESCO Intangible Cultural Heritage
- Country: Italy
- Reference: 00721
- Region: Europe and North America

Inscription history
- Inscription: 2013 (8th session)
- List: Representative

The Macchina di Santa Rosa is a 30-metre-high (98 ft) machine built to honor Rose of Viterbo, the patron saint of Viterbo, Italy. Every 3rd of September, a hundred men called "Facchini di Santa Rosa" ('Saint Rose's porters') carry the contraption—weighing about 11,000 pounds (5,000 kg)—and parade it through the streets and squares of Viterbo's medieval town centre, amid festive crowds of devotees and onlookers. The whole route is slightly longer than 1 km (0.62 mi). Every five years, a new Macchina design is built.

The machine's procession is a significant event in Viterbo, attracting thousands of spectators, and is included in the UNESCO Representative List of the Intangible Cultural Heritage of Humanity.

== History ==
The celebration consists of two distinct parts. On the afternoon of 2 September, a reliquary containing the heart of Santa Rosa is carried in procession accompanied by people in period costumes of the 14th through the 19th centuries. The transport of Machine of Santa Rosa takes place the following evening. The term machine is borrowed from classical Greek theater.

The transport of the Macchina dates back to the transfer of the body of Saint Rose of Viterbo herself. In 1258, six years after her death, her body was moved at the wish of Pope Alexander IV, from the small parish church of Santa Maria in Poggio to the church Santa Maria delle Rose (today the pilgrimage chapel of Saint Rose). It is possible that originally the inspiration for today's Macchina was a processional statue of St Rose carried on a canopy lit by candles. Guilds were very active in the processions in the 14th century. From 1654 through 1663 the procession was suspended due to the plague.

The first "machine" was probably designed by Count Sebastian Gregory Fani in 1686. The Civic Museum of Viterbo has a collection of sketches of the machine dating to 1690. In the 18th century, wealthy noble families of Viterbo sponsored lavish machines of Saint Rose.

In 1790 the machine fell during the move. In 1801 the cries of a spectator robbed of her jewels by some pickpockets in the Piazza Fontana Grande panicked some cavalry horses. Twenty-two people in the crowd died in the ensuing confusion and later that night the machine caught fire in Piazza delle Erbe. Because of these events, the transport was temporarily banned by Pope Pius VII, only to resume around 1810. In 1814 tilted backwards and a few porters died.

In 1893 pouring rain prevented the transport, which proved fortunate when it was later discovered that some anarchists were planning to throw bombs at the machine. The transport was suspended with the outbreak of World War I, but resumed in 1918.

From 1924 to 1951 (except for the interruption caused by the Second World War) the Machine of Santa Rosa was designed and constructed by Virgilio Papini, whose family had a long history of building the machines. In 1967 a new design did not get farther than the end of Via Cavour due to either excessive weight, or height, or tired Facchini.

On the occasion of a papal visit by Pope John Paul II, on 27 May 1984, the Macchina was brought out and taken to the piazza in front of the Chapel of Santa Rosa. On 6 September 2009, Pope Benedict XVI viewed the new Macchina di Santa Rosa Fiore del Cielo in front of the pilgrimage chapel.

In April 2014 the "Flower of Heaven" was erected at the Milan Expo; the new tower for 2015 is called "Gloria".

== Construction ==
Until a few decades ago, the Machine of Santa Rosa was built with paper mache and mounted on a wooden frame. Today, that system has been abandoned and replaced with various materials, such as resin, plastic and fibreglass, supported by a framework of steel pipes.

Every five years a design competition is launched for a new Macchina. The guidelines for the competition ask for a 28-metre-high (92 ft) tower, which is measured from the shoulder of the porters. The constraption must weigh less than 5 tonnes and measure less than 4.3 metres in width in order to maneuver the narrow streets of the historical centre, where eaves and balconies could strike the carried Macchina.

The appearance of the Macchina has changed throughout history. The altar-like constructions from the 18th century developed to constructions similar to church towers and in the 2nd half of the 20th century they developed to 30m high sculptural towers. While originally the towers were mainly made from papier-mâché, today materials such as steel, aluminium and fibreglass are used to achieve a light and fireproof construction.

The current model (since 2009) is called "Fiore del Cielo" ('Flower of Heaven'). It was designed by the architecture office Architecture and Vision (architects: Arturo Vittori and Andreas Vogler). The design is characterized by the three golden helix surfaces which grow upwards. In contrast to the former Macchina many innovations were introduced. Some of these are the golden color scheme and more than 1200 computer-controlled LED lights, which are illuminating the handmade textile roses. A special scenography was developed, which also includes a rain of rose petals on the spectators at a certain stop.

== Facchini ==
The Sodality Facchini of Santa Rosa was founded in 1978 to keep alive the age old tradition and ensure it is done in a safe and responsible manner. The Sodality also promotes cultural activities, tourism, and mutual aid for its members. The Sodality was one of the signatories to the UNESCO project application. It is based at the Museum of the Society Facchini of Santa Rosa which opened in 1994.

The Facchini wear a white uniform with a red sash tied at the waist and a headdress covered in leather. To be selected as one of the Facchini is considered a particular honor, and one most pass a test of strength, carrying a 150-kilogram box on his shoulders for at least one hundred meters without stopping. Before setting out they receive a special blessing. At around 9 pm the Facchini lift the 5 ton Macchina and start the first leg of the passage to the cheers of onlookers. For most of the route, the Facchini walk without any visual aid, directed by the capofacchini and guides posted at the four corners of the machine.

== Transport ==
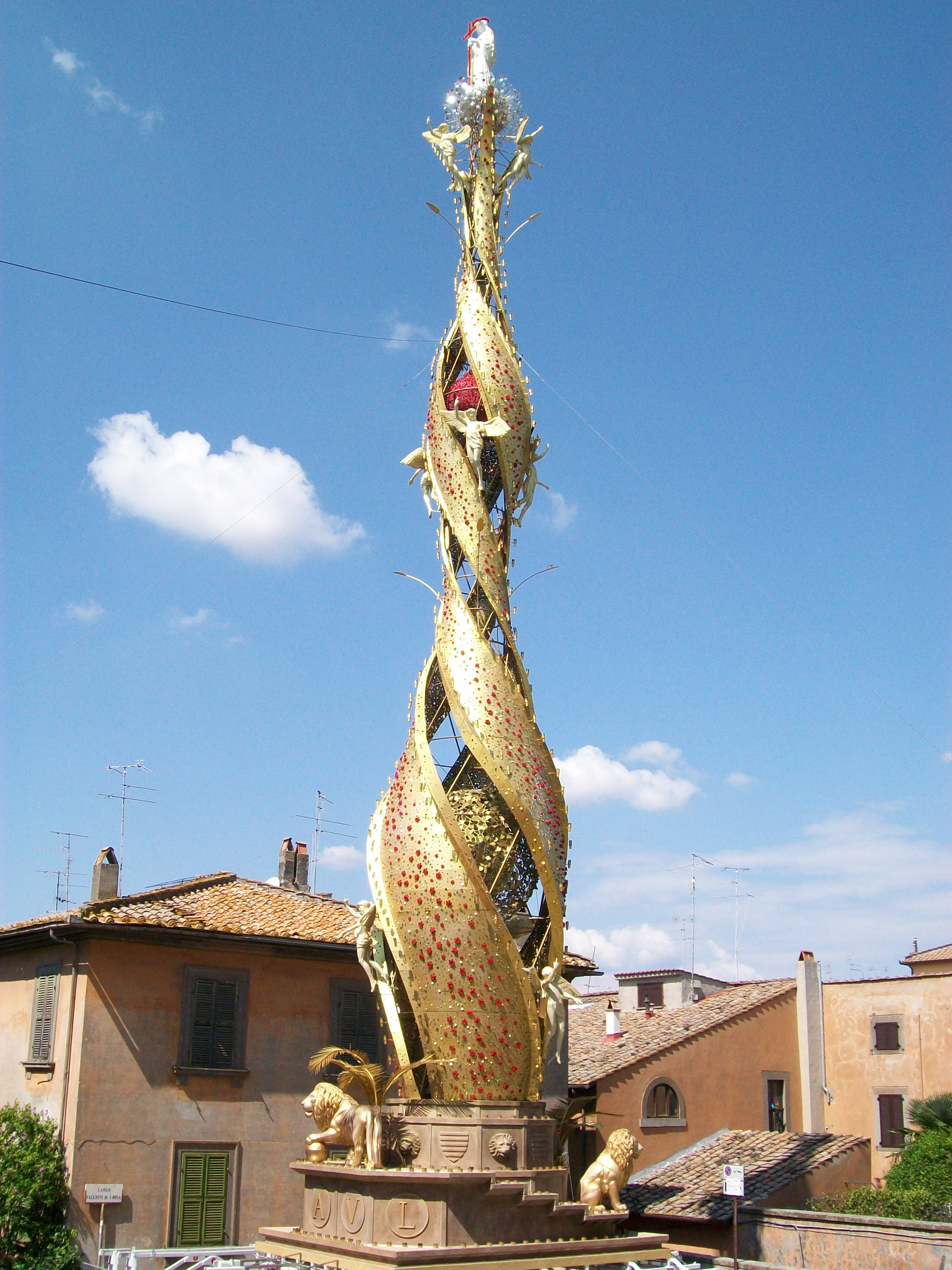
Fiore del Cielo on 5 September 2009

The transport of the Macchina di Santa Rosa is the annual main event of the city of Viterbo. By the afternoon of 3 September, the streets of the historical centre are being filled with citizens and visitors. The transport begins at the Porta Romana, where the assembled Macchina stays in a scaffold, which is covered with curtains. At around 8 pm the 800 candles of the Macchina are lighted by the local fire brigade. The street lighting will be switched off completely.

During the transport there are five breaks. During these breaks the Macchina is put on special frames. The stopping places are:

- Piazza Fontana Grande
- Piazza del Plebiscito (in front of the Palazzo dei Priori)
- Piazza delle Erbe
- Corso Italia (in front of the church Santa Maria del Suffragio)
- Piazza del Teatro.

The last stretch up to the church of Santa Rosa has a remarkable inclination. In order to overcome this slope, the Macchina is pulled by ropes and additional people and is eventually placed in front of the pilgrimage chapel. The Macchina is exposed there for some days after the event.
