= AeroLiner3000 =

Double-decker train concept

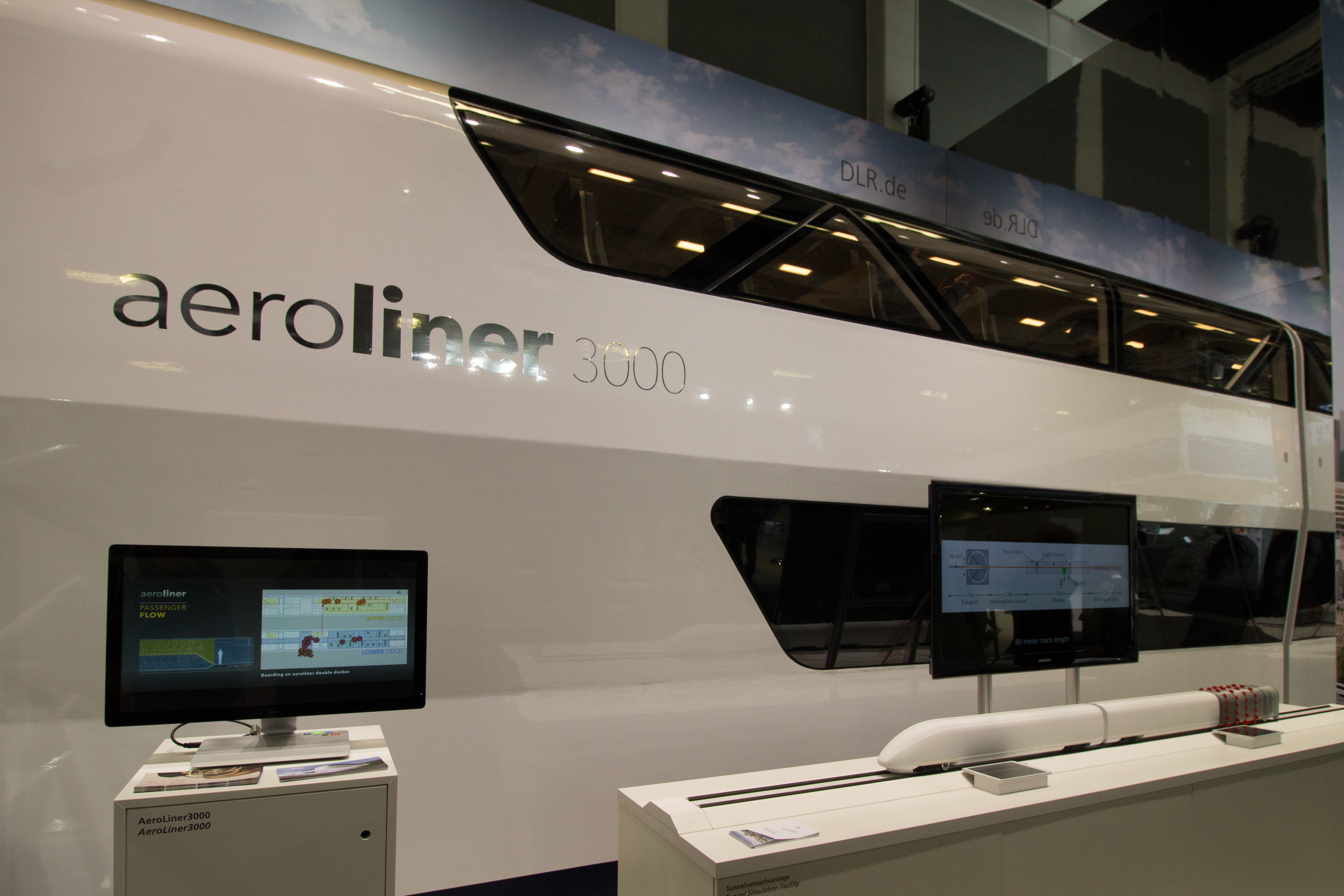
AeroLiner 3000 at InnoTrans 2016

The AeroLiner3000 is a project for the introduction of a double-decker train in the UK, which can run on a large part of the existing British rail network with the tight loading gauge PG1. The train was developed by Andreas Vogler Studio together with the German Aerospace Center (Deutsches Zentrum für Luft- und Raumfahrt - DLR). At the InnoTrans 2016 in Berlin, a 9-metre (30 ft) long full-scale demonstrator was presented.

== Background ==
In 2014, Rail Safety and Standards Board (RSSB)'s innovation programme launched a competition titled "Tomorrow’s Train Design Today" to identify passenger rolling stock designs that will provide ‘a glimpse of the future’ and showcase the capability of the rolling stock supply chain to deliver key elements of design to the rail industry. The goals of the competition were formulated to be very open, but with one main restriction: not to touch the basic infrastructure. The main drivers of the competition brief are the 4Cs: capacity, low-carbon, customer comfort, and cost-sensitive innovation.

Andreas Vogler Studio (AVS) teamed up with the German Aerospace Center (DLR) to propose a high-capacity double-decker high-speed train to run at up to 400 km/h (250 mph) on the new High Speed 2 (HS2) high-speed line from London to Birmingham and be able to continue on the existing lines as far as Edinburgh. The resulting train, named "AeroLiner3000”, became competition finalist and a feasibility study was conducted. A demonstrator was also built and shown at the InnoTrans 2016 in Berlin.

Over the past two decades, double-decker cars have greatly helped to increase capacity for train operators, especially in Europe, but also worldwide. However, due to historical reasons, Great Britain has been greatly restricted by its limited gauge and generally, double-decker cars have not been considered.

=== Previous British double-deck carriages ===
Originally started as an experiment, British Railways did have the 'Bulleid Double Decker' car SR Class 4DD in operation for more than 20 years from 1949 to 1971. As the compartments were alternately high and low, to ensure that the overall height of the unit was within the clearances necessary to pass through tunnels and under bridges, the 'Bulleid Double Decker' was more a split-level than a true double-decker.

The 4DD was somewhat unsuccessful because the upper level compartments were cramped and poorly ventilated (the upper-level windows could not be opened due to tight clearance). The compartments were pressure-ventilated but the equipment proved to be troublesome. Dwell times at stations were lengthened because of the increase in the number of passengers per door. Finally, to obtain the extra seating capacity that was being sought, it was instead decided to lengthen trains from eight cars to ten and to further decrease the seat pitch.

== Concept ==
The AeroLiner3000 proposal has set itself the goal of investigating a double-decker high-speed train following the HS2 Classic Compatible Train Specifications 2012.

The resulting concept is a 200 m (660 ft) trainset, with 20 m (66 ft) long end cars and 17 m (56 ft) long intermediate car, each with four individually powered and controlled wheels at the very end to form an innovative virtual Jacobs-bogie. The axle loads are 17 tonnes. The cars' construction consists of continuously bent equal diameter steel tubes which are laser welded, achieving an extreme lightweight construction, which becomes also apparent in the large windows with their very slim diagonal posts. The total weight is about 25% less compared to a conventional car-body. Each car has two small toilets and six priority seats at the lower deck. Depending on the train layout, a 200 m trainset with at least 627 and up to 700 seats can be achieved. This compares to a TGV Duplex with 510 seats.

A half-train of the double-deck AeroLiner3000 electrical multiple unit (EMU) consists of two end cars and nine intermediate cars with independently rotating wheel running gear to allow for passage on the lower deck. The middle intermediate car is a multi-functional car which can provide a restaurant. The 374-tonne train is capable of running operationally at up to 400 km/h on high-speed lines. Fitting into the GB PG1 gauge allows for running on many other lines of the GB rail network as well. The AeroLiner3000 is planned to run on the existing infrastructure.

=== Propulsion system ===
The propulsion system has a power performance of 12 MW at the wheel to achieve maximum speed. This power is equally distributed over the 44 near-wheel motors, which provide 270 kW each. Both end cars have pantographs for the AC 50 Hz 25 kV overhead catenary system (OCS). Of those, only one is usually in operation to avoid oscillation of the OCS. In normal operation, the train slows by first by coasting, then by dynamic braking for greater deceleration. In an emergency, the train applies additional eddy-current brakes at speeds between 250 km/h and 50 km/h to comply with the TSI High-Speed. For stand-still, there is a friction-based brake. The intermediate cars are permanently coupled by a central buffer coupling. Half-trains have a virtual coupling to increase the operating flexibility within ETCS L3 train protection. A 410 m (1,350 ft) full-train with 1,400 seats consists of two virtually coupled half-trains.

=== Aerodynamic design ===
The aerodynamic design of the entire train culminates with a super-elliptical shell surface between the nose and the roof of the end car, fully covered wheel sets and car connections, and seamless undercarriage. The drag, and therefore noise, is very low.

The end car front is designed with medium fineness ratio because it is assumed that in the future tunnel portals on high-speed lines will be constructed to cope with the train pressure head wave. The cross wind stability of this lightweight train has been tested in a wind-tunnel.

=== Lightweight construction cesign ===
Comprehensive use of lightweight design techniques that reduce the weight of the car body by 25% and optimised aerodynamics reduce operating and maintenance costs and limit carbon dioxide and noise emissions. Furthermore, the weight savings will enable a double-decker car for GB PG1 gauge to be in line with the TSI-PRM standards and offer better seating comfort than many UK trains currently in operation. The load-bearing structure of the car body is adapted to the requirements and loads, with structural characteristics that are needed to ensure stability. This means that the interior design can be optimised, for example with regard to the design and shape of the upper deck floor, making a double-decker concept with high flexibility possible.

=== Passenger comfort ===
The passenger comfort is achieved through reasonable seat pitches of 830 mm, low noise, pressure variations and vibration, and with improved air conditioning and interactive smartphone-based passenger information. The AeroLiner3000's design is optimised to achieve five minute dwell times at stations despite seating about 30% more passengers than a TGV Duplex. To this end, baggage is taken care of by a robotic baggage handling system. Passengers check-in their baggage in the centre of the platform.

=== Illumination ===
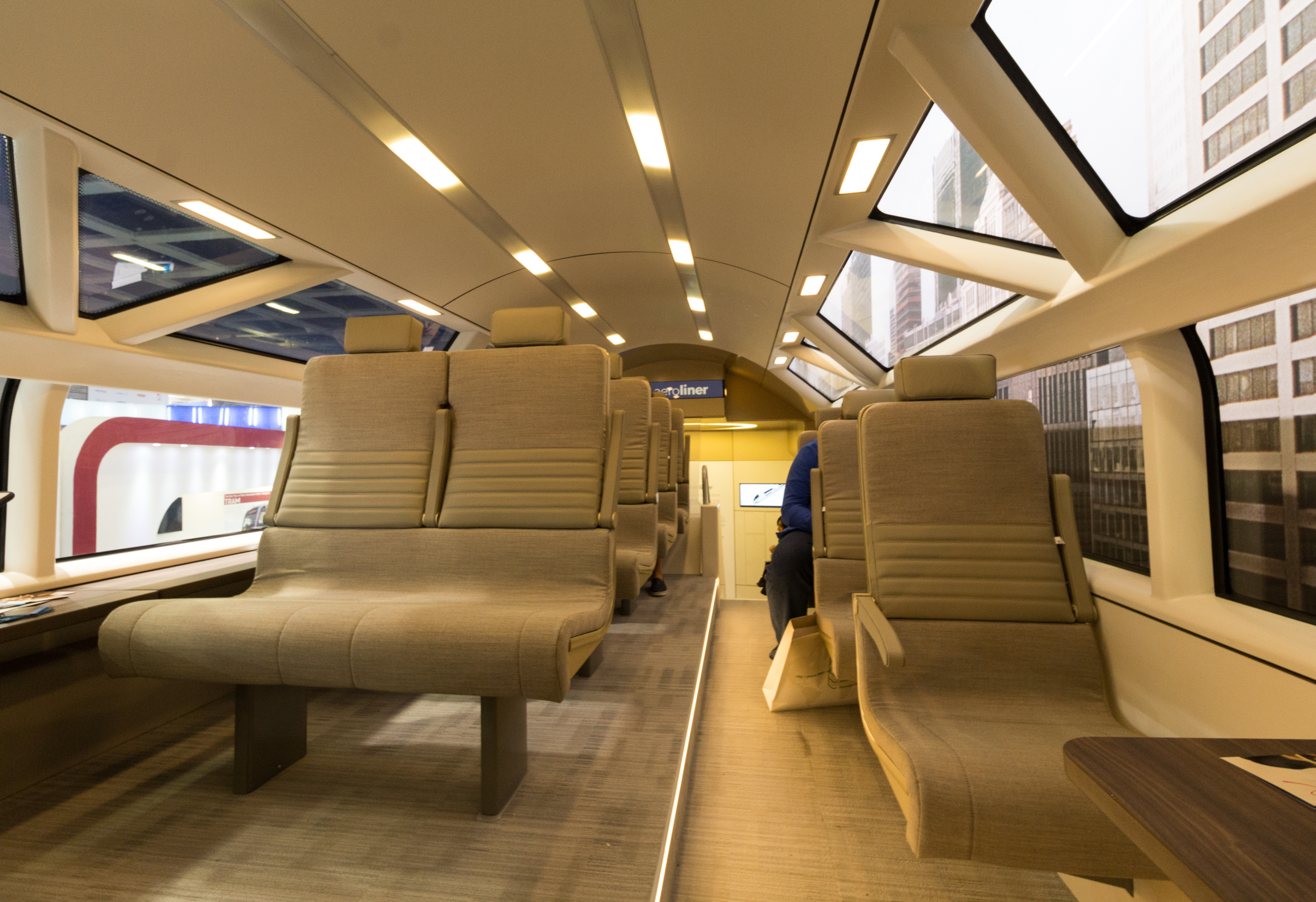
AeroLiner 3000 upper level with OLED illumination.

The illumination concept employs organic light emitting diodes (OLED), which are well suited to this application since they can be built into the ceiling with a depth less than 3 mm, providing a glare-free, dimmable, comfortable light. The illumination system works together with shading of the windows and pro-actively takes tunnels into account.

== Realisation ==
For ergonomic studies and as a demonstration of the feasibility and plausibility of the concept, a fully developed 9 m long demonstrator was built. This was presented at the InnoTrans 2016 in Berlin as world premiere. The next plan is to build a 17 m test car and drive it on the British rail network.

== Awards ==
The AeroLiner3000 has won several international design awards such as the IF Design Award, the Red Dot Award and the German Design Award.
