= LaFenice =

Sculpture in Messina, Italy

Coordinates: 38°11′28.28″N 15°33′24.81″E

LaFenice (The Phoenix) is a public sculpture by the Architecture and Vision design team, Arturo Vittori and Andreas Vogler, sited in the Piazza della Memoria of the waterfront in Messina, Sicily in Italy. The sculpture for this memorial square was selected in a city-sponsored competition as part of a larger urban renewal project started in 2003 to revitalize the public spaces between buildings built in the 1930s along the quay. The sculpture was unveiled on June 23, 2011.

== Site and design ==
Church of the Annunciation of the Catalans with its geometric patterned stonework

The sculpture is situated at the intersection of several important axes, connecting the busy port to the city, tracing the boulevard flanking the waterfront, and ultimately, between the Earth and sky. Its polished surface reflects the activity of people in the square as well as the surrounding civic and natural environment.

The monolith consists of three and a half slightly skewed double pyramids stacked on each other. Between each pyramid, glass panels house lighting that produces a program of effects at night. The shape is integrated into the patterned stone and etched glass ‘time capsule’ base that reveals strata from the 1908 earthquake below the elevated square. The sculpture also takes inspiration from the geometric patterns in the multi-colored stonework in the Norman-Arab-Byzantine architecture of the nearby Church of the Annunciation of the Catalans (Annunziata dei Catalani), built during the 12th Century on the site of a pagan temple to Neptune. Artistic influences include Anish Kapoor (Cloud Gate) and Constantin Brâncuși (Endless Column).

== Theme ==
The sculpture's upward thrust commemorates the collective memory of the citizens that have tenaciously rebuilt their city each time it has been devastated by war or natural disaster, most famously, the December 1908 earthquake. Nearly every building was leveled and thousands died. The mythological Phoenix bird, magically ascending from its own ashes, is a symbol of hope and renewal.

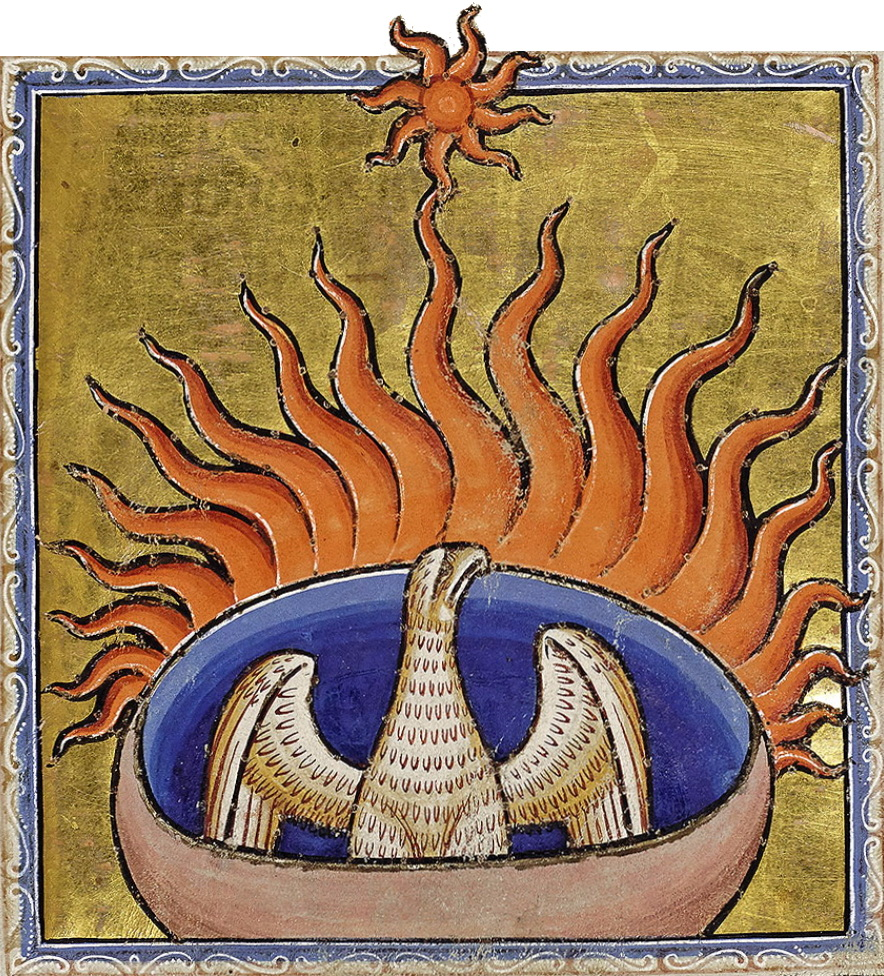
The mythological Phoenix is a symbol of hope and renewal

== Construction ==
A central column provides structure over which the highly polished, prefabricated stainless shapes are stacked. Blue glass panels protect DMX controlled LED lighting between each pyramid element. Engineering services were provided by RFR Paris. The sculpture measures 0.5 x 1 meter, 4.1 meters high and weighs 800 kilograms.

== Sources ==
- p. 164-5, Encyclopedia of Earthquakes and Volcanoes; David Ritchie, Alexander E. Gates, Facts on File, Inc., New York: 2007
