= Saint Rose de Viterbo Catholic Church =

Coordinates: 46.1325111°N 122.9523998°W

Saint Rose of Viterbo
- Saint Rose of Viterbo
- Location: Longview, Washington
- Country: United States
- Denomination: Catholic
- Website: www.stroselongview.com

Administration
- Archdiocese: Archdiocese of Seattle

Clergy
- Archbishop: The Most Rev. Archbishop Paul D. Etienne
- Priest(s): Fr. Vinner Raj Simeon Raj, H.G.N.
- Pastor: Fr. Brian Thompson

Saint Rose de Viterbo Catholic Church is a Roman Catholic church in Longview, Washington, United States dedicated to Rose of Viterbo. It is a part of Saint Rose Parish inside the Archdiocese of Seattle.

The parish was established in 1927 by Bishop John O'dea to serve the catholic population of the city of Longview, which had been established in 1923. There were four mission churches at Castle Rock, Cathlamet, Kalama, and Woodland, and a new wood-framed church was built for the parish by 1928. This was replaced in 1959 by the current building in stone and glass, which has a steeple 97 feet (30 m) tall.
