= Planetary surface construction =

Construction of structures on planetary surface

Planetary-surface construction is the construction of artificial habitats and other structures on planetary surfaces. Planetary surface construction can be divided into three phases or classes, coinciding with a phased schedule for habitation:

• Class I: Pre-integrated hard shell modules ready to use immediately upon delivery.

• Class II: Prefabricated kit-of-parts that is surface assembled after delivery.

• Class III: in-situ resource utilization (ISRU) derived structure with integrated Earth components.

Class I structures are prepared and tested on Earth, and are designed to be fully self-contained habitats that can be delivered to the surface of other planets. In an initial mission to put human explorers on Mars, a Class I habitat would provide the bare minimum habitable facilities when continued support from Earth is not possible.

The Class II structures call for a pre-manufactured kit-of-parts system that has flexible capacity for demountability and reuse. Class II structures can be used to expand the facilities established by the initial Class I habitat, and can allow for the assembly of additional structures either before the crew arrives, or after their occupancy of the pre-integrated habitat.

The purpose of Class III structures is to allow for the construction of additional facilities that would support a larger population, and to develop the capacity for the local production of building materials and structures without the need for resupply from Earth.

To facilitate the development of technology required to implement the three phases, Cohen and Kennedy (1997) stress the need to explore robust robotic system concepts that can be used to assist in the construction process, or perform the tasks autonomously. Among other things, they suggest a roadmap that stresses the need for adapting structural components for robotic assembly, and determining appropriate levels of modularity, assembly, and component packaging. The roadmap also sets the development of experimental construction systems in parallel with components as an important milestone.

== See also ==
- Aerospace architecture – Discipline of architectural design
- Airborne observatory – Telescopes carried by aircraft
- Ground station – Terrestrial radio station for communication with spacecraft
- Human spaceflight – Spaceflight with a crew or passengers
- Inflatable space habitat – Structure that can support life whose volume can be increased in outer space
- Mars to Stay – Mars colonization architecture proposing no return vehicles
- Offshore construction – Installation of structures and facilities in a marine environment
- Research station – Facility for scientific research
- Space architecture – Architecture of off-planet habitable structures
- Spaceport – Location used to launch and receive spacecraft
- Underground construction – Field of engineering for the design and construction of structures below the ground
- Underwater construction – Industrial construction in an underwater environment
