= Andreas Vogler Studio =

Architecture and design firm

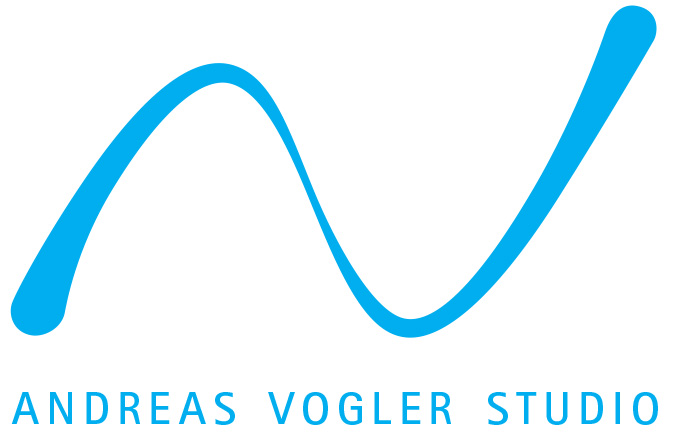

Practice information
- Key architects: Andreas Vogler
- Founded: 2014

Significant works and honors
- Projects: Aeroliner3000

Website
- www.andreasvogler.com

Andreas Vogler Studio is an international and multidisciplinary firm for architecture and innovative design, with headquarters in Munich. The practice is led by its founder, Andreas Vogler and was established in 2014 shortly after he left Architecture and Vision. The practice specializes in novel solutions using technology, art, history and futurist ideas for inspiration.

== Description ==
Andreas Vogler Studio is an architecture and design studio based in Munich and founded by Swiss architect and designer Andreas Vogler. The studio combines the fields of Aerospace, Art and Architecture. Design is understood as a process for complex problem solving using scientific methods, technological know-how and artistic intuition. The Studio has experience in space mission planning for orbital, lunar and Mars environments.

The studio's recent work includes the Swiss General Consulate in Munich, the residence of the General Consul of Switzerland in Munich and a new double deck High Speed Train for the United Kingdom developed with the German Aerospace Center DLR. Clients include the public and private sector.

Projects of Andreas Vogler have been exhibited in Centre Pompidou, Paris and are included in the permanent collections of the Museum of Modern Art MoMA, New York and the Museum of Science and Industry, Chicago. He is a member of the Bavarian Chamber of Architects, Deutscher Werkbund, the German Society of Architects BDA and the American Institute of Aeronautics and Astronautics (AIAA). Andreas Vogler Studio is currently involved in the transportation competition “Tomorrow’s Train Design Today” hosted by GB Railway, The Royal Institute of British Architects (RIBA), the FutureRailway Team, and the Department for Transport (DfT). On April 8, 2015, the Andreas Vogler Studio was named one of three finalists.

== Projects ==
2018

- Design Thinking Workshop for Train Seats

2017

- Designs for Cleaning Devices
- Private Apartment in Berlin

2016

- AeroLiner3000 Demonstrator phase.
- Swiss Residence Munich
- Interiors for Swiss Club Munich

2015

- AeroLiner3000 Feasibility Study
- Swiss-A-Loo
- EyeInTheSky - Electronic Sculpture for ArsTechnica

2014

- "AeroLiner3000", finalist Tomorrow's Train Design Today, 2014-2016 (ongoing project), UK
- "SwissConsulate", Swiss Consulate, Munich, Germany

== Competitions ==
2018

- Shunde Robotics Park

2017

- UN Telecommunications Headquarter, Geneva, Switzerland
- Haus der Weimarer Republik, Weimar
- Sculptures for the Charité, Berlin
- Modern Beergarden near Bologna
- Meizu Headquarters, Zuhai, China
- Kindergarten in Winkel, Switzerland

2016

- Church in Breslau.
- JAZZI Philosophical Landscape Park
- Verona Arena Roofing

2015

- Tomorrow's Train Design Today, 2nd Stage

2014

- Tomorrow's Train Design Today
- Cocinella - Kindergarten for St. Moritz

== Awards ==
- iF Design Award 2018
- Red Dot Award 2017
- German Design Award 2017
- World Changing Ideas Award, 2017 Finalist

== Publications ==
- DLR Portal
- Bustler
- Kölner Wissenschaftsrunde
- Railway Interiors 2015
- The Engineer
- Rail Technology Magazine
- Inventor Magazine
