= High Altitude Venus Operational Concept =

NASA crewed Venus mission concept

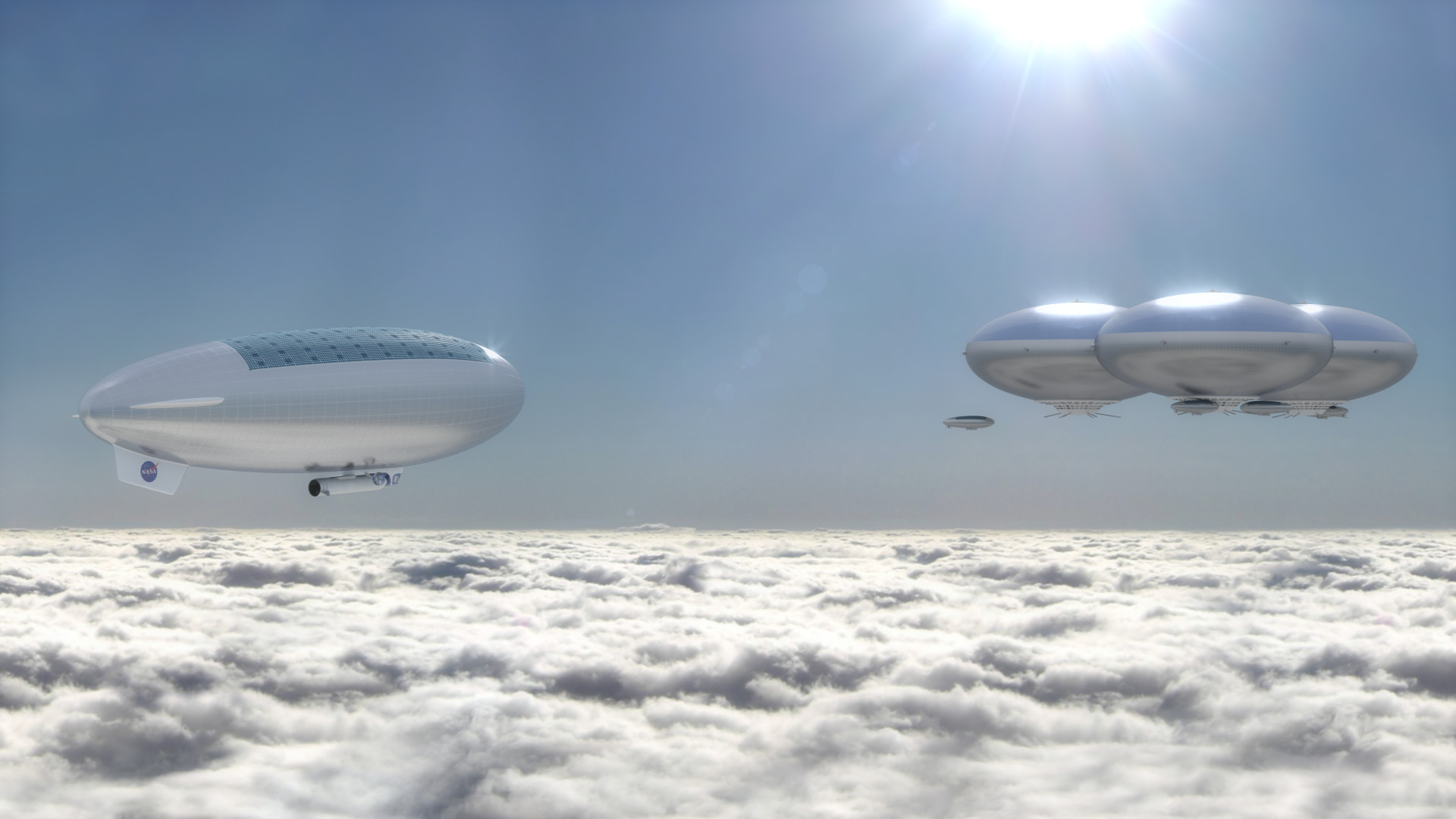
Artist's rendering of a NASA crewed floating outpost on Venus

High Altitude Venus Operational Concept (HAVOC) was a proposed set of crewed NASA mission concepts to the planet Venus. All human portions of the missions would be conducted from lighter-than-air craft or from orbit. A similar concept, the "Floating Islands of Venus", was proposed by Soviet engineer and sci-fi writer Sergei Zhitomirsky in 1971. NASA never intended to seriously pursue HAVOC, instead using it as a development tool for analysis skills in young engineers.

== Background ==
Human missions to Venus have historically been thought impractical, if not impossible. However, Venus has advantages for crewed travel, such as being closer than Mars, an Earth-like gravity (0.9 g) and an atmosphere that provides a level of protection from solar and interstellar radiation.

Whereas all ground missions measured their operational time in minutes or hours, the Soviet Vega missions found success in launching small balloons, that operated until their batteries were exhausted (days). At 55 km (34 mi) altitude, the atmosphere of Venus is 27 °C (81 °F) and 0.5 bar (50 kPa) (the equivalent pressure at an elevation of about 5,500 m (18,000 ft) on Earth). However, due to the large amount of CO_{2}, the density for a given pressure is greater than in Earth's atmosphere. Therefore, breathable air acts as a buoyant gas. At the same time, the gravity at the proposed altitude is 8.73 m/s^{2} versus 9.81 m/s^{2} on Earth's surface.

Venus has an induced magnetosphere from the interaction of its thick atmosphere with the solar wind, and its nearer proximity to the Sun brings it further within the Sun's magnetic field, which decreases the interstellar radiation levels. With the addition of the reduced deep space exposure time, the radiation levels anticipated by astronauts are much less than an equivalent Mars mission.

=== Development ===
The project was proposed and created in 2014 by Dale Arney and Chris Jones, engineers at NASA Langley’s Space Mission Analysis Branch which were inspired by a meeting about potential Mars habitation programs to create a similar program for Venus. After their proposal received internal project funding the pair put together a team of systems analysts, student interns, aircraft design engineers, trajectory analysts, and Entry, Descent, and Landing (EDL) experts to build the concept up. The concept called for extensive robotic exploration of Venus to occur, similar to Mars exploration missions, before any human mission was attempted. As Arney and Jones published their work as technical papers the general public caught wind of the program and the pair frequently did news interviews on the development status. However, NASA would go on to state that HAVOC was never a "true mission for human exploration of Venus" instead being intended as an internal study to develop analysis skills and the project never saw additional funding and would be canceled by 2017. Despite this, some of the technologies the team conceptualized would need to be created for HAVOC's success would go on to be developed for potential Moon and Mars missions. Both Arney and Jones would go on to become senior members of the Systems Analysis and Concepts Directorate.

== Mission concepts ==
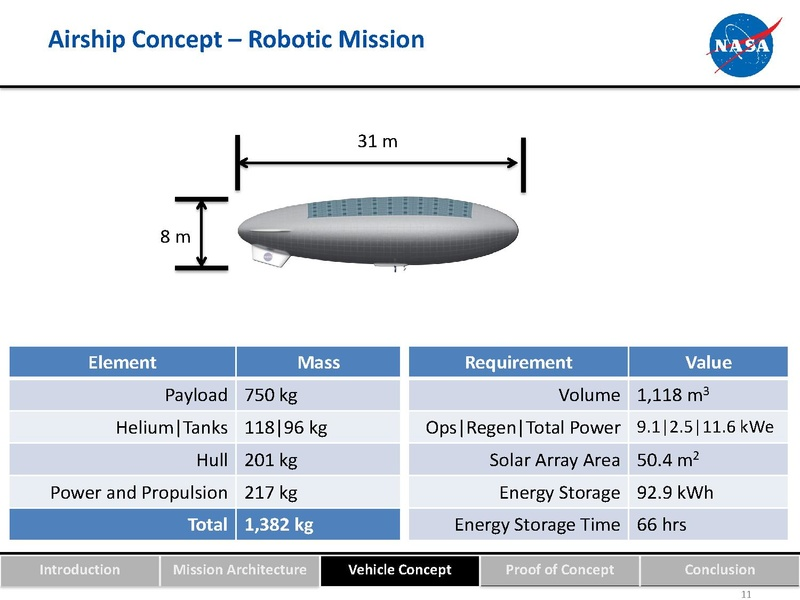
Suggested specifications for the robotic airship

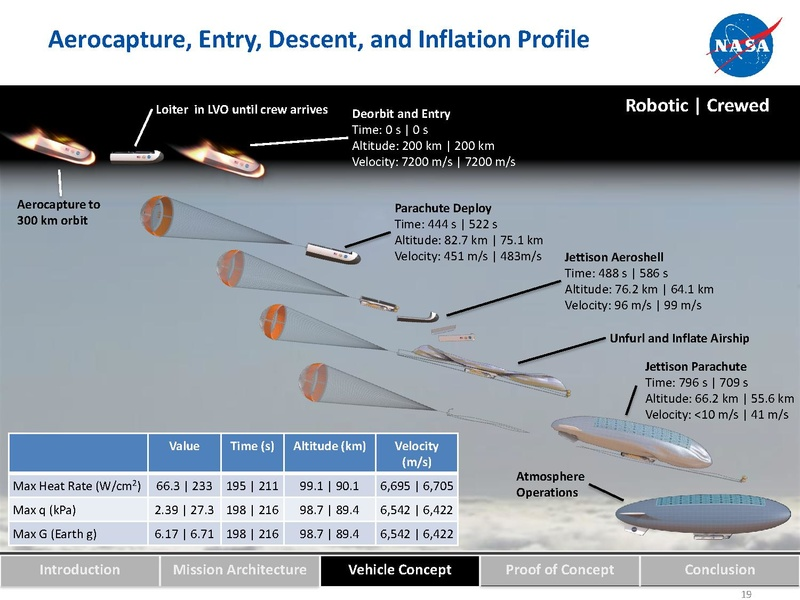
Slide detailing sequence of events for the crewed descent

=== Phase 1 ===
Phase 1 involves a robotic exploration via a 31-meter-long (102 ft), 8-meter-tall (26 ft), airship. It would be used to test many of the technologies that would be used in the crewed version, including the airship, energy systems, and aerocapture and descent sled.

=== Phase 2 ===
Phase 2 is for astronauts to orbit Venus. The individual components would be assembled remotely, and the crew would join the larger assembly when all the preparations are complete. There would be a return module sent to low Venus orbit ahead of the astronauts, with which they would rendezvous in Venusian orbit, before returning to Earth.

=== Phase 3 ===
Phase 3 involves astronauts descending into the atmosphere, for 30 Earth days. The airship for this would be 129 meters (423 ft) long and 34 meters (112 ft) tall. The aeroshell would be used for heat dissipation. A parachute would be deployed to further slow the craft, before finally inflating the airship. Once inflated, the crew would live in the airship for a period equivalent to thirty Earth days, before detaching and ascending in the Venus Ascent Vehicle.

The outward journey for this phase would take 110 Earth days, and the return 300. The total mission time would thus be 440 days.

=== Phase 4 ===
Phase 4 of the concept is to send humans into the atmosphere of Venus for 1 Earth year, similar to Phase 3 but longer.

=== Phase 5 ===
Phase 5 is introducing a permanent human presence, in the Venusian atmosphere, by way of a permanent space station-type spacecraft.

== See also ==
- Aerobot
- Aerospace architecture
