= Architecture and Vision =

Architecture and Vision (AV) is an international multidisciplinary design agency that was formed in 2003 by Arturo Vittori in partnership with Andreas Volger. AV works in architecture, design, and art.

The practice is mainly based around technology transfer between disciplines such as aerospace, art, and architecture.

== History ==
Architecture and Vision was established in 2003 and is directed by architect Arturo Vittori, based in Bomarzo Viterbo, Italy, and Andreas Vogler, based in Munich, Germany.

== Projects ==
- 2014: WarkaWater 2.0, USEK, Beirut, Lebanon
- 2013: OR of the Future, UIC, Chicago, United States
- 2012: WarkaWater, Venice Biennale, Venice, Italy
- 2011: LaFenice, Messina, Sicily, Italy
- 2011: AtlasCoelestisZeroG, International Space Station
- 2011: Corsair International, Paris, France
- 2009: AtlasCoelestis, Sullivan Galleries, Chicago, Illinois
- 2009: MercuryHouseOne, Venice Biennale, Venice, Italy
- 2009: FioredelCielo, Macchina di Santa Rosa, Viterbo, Italy
- 2007: BirdHouse, Bird House Foundation, Osaka, Japan
- 2006: DesertSeal, permanent collection, Museum of Modern Art (MOMA), New York City

== Awards and recognition ==
In 2006, the "DesertSeal" (2004), an extreme environment tent prototype, gained recognition when it became a part of the permanent collection at the Museum of Modern Art in New York. It was featured in the exhibition "SAFE: Design Takes on Risk" (2005), curated by Paola Antonelli. The same year, Vittori and Vogler were honored as "Modern-day Leonardos" by the Museum of Science and Industry during its Leonardo da Vinci: Man, Inventor, Genius exhibition.

In 2007, the Museum of Science and Industry acquired a model of the inflatable habitat "MoonBaseTwo" (2007), designed to facilitate long-term exploration on the Moon. Additionally, the "MarsCruiserOne" (2007), a pressurized laboratory rover for Mars exploration, was showcased at the Centre Georges Pompidou in Paris as part of the Airs de Paris exhibition.
