= Warka Water =

Bamboo water-harvesting tower designed by Arturo Vittori

Warka Water is a bamboo and polyester-mesh tower designed by Italian architect Arturo Vittori that collects dew, fog, and rainwater from the atmosphere. Vittori developed it to provide drinking water in rural parts of Ethiopia and other countries where clean water is scarce, and first presented the project at the Venice Biennale of Architecture in 2012. The design won the World Design Impact Prize in 2016.

== Background ==
Hundreds of millions of people in Sub-Saharan Africa lack access to safe drinking water, according to the World Health Organization. In rural Ethiopia, many communities still depend on rivers, unprotected springs, or ponds, which are often contaminated. Vittori said the idea came to him during a 2012 visit to the Ethiopian highlands, where he saw women and children walking long distances for water.

The tower is named after the warka tree (Ficus vasta), a large fig tree native to Ethiopia often used as a communal gathering spot in villages.

== Design and function ==
The tower is about 9.5 metres (31 ft) tall and weighs roughly 80 kilograms (180 lb). A triangular lattice of bamboo forms the outer frame, held together with rope and wire rather than screws or nails. A polyester mesh net hangs inside, and this is where condensation collects.

Overnight and in the early morning, as temperatures drop and humidity climbs, moisture gathers on the mesh fibres and drips into a basin at the base. The structure also catches rainwater and fog when conditions allow. A fabric canopy shades part of the basin to slow evaporation.

The mesh geometry draws on biomimetics, borrowing from the surface structures of certain beetles, spider silk, and cactus spines that collect moisture from humid air. The tower runs without electricity or moving parts.

A single tower can collect up to 100 litres (26 US gal) of water per day, though actual output varies with local weather conditions.

== Development ==
Vittori and Swiss architect Andreas Vogler started work on the concept in 2012 through their joint studio, Architecture and Vision. They built several prototypes in Italy before installing the first pilot tower in Dorze, a village in the Gamo Highlands of southern Ethiopia, in 2015.

In 2016, Vittori established Warka Water Inc. as a nonprofit organization based in the United States to fund further development and tower installations.

Starting in 2020, the organization took on a larger project in Mvoumagomi, near Kribi in southern Cameroon. Called "Warka Village," it was built for the local Baka community and paired three water towers with houses, a school, and farming plots, using materials from the surrounding area. Additional towers have been installed in Togo and Haiti.

== Reception ==
Warka Water won the World Design Impact Prize 2015-2016, presented by the World Design Organization at the World Design Capital Taipei 2016 gala on 18 March 2016. The project was also shortlisted for the Aga Khan Award for Architecture in 2019.

Because the towers use inexpensive materials and no electricity, they are cheaper to operate than conventional water infrastructure in remote areas. They do require regular upkeep: the mesh wears out, bamboo sections need replacing, and the expected lifespan of a tower is about ten years. Water yields also depend on local climate. Collected water may need boiling or microfiltration, as insects and organic matter can leave bacteria on the condensation surfaces.

== See also ==
- Atmospheric water generator
- Fog collection
- Water supply and sanitation in Ethiopia
