= Rose of Viterbo =

Christian saint

Saint Rose of Viterbo TOSF
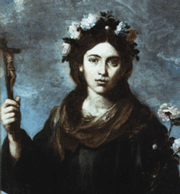

Virgin
- Born: c. 1233; Viterbo, Papal States
- Died: 6 March 1251; Viterbo, Papal States
- Venerated in: Roman Catholic Church
- Canonized: 1457 by Pope Callistus III
- Major shrine: Church of St. Rose; Viterbo, Italy Saint Rose de Viterbo Catholic Church Longview, Washington
- Feast: 4 September
- Attributes: crown of roses, crucifix

Rose of Viterbo, TOSF (Italian: Rosa da Viterbo; c. 1233 – 6 March 1251), was a young woman born in Viterbo, then a contested commune of the Papal States. She spent her brief life as a recluse, and was outspoken in her support of the papacy. Otherwise leading an unremarkable life, she later became known for her mystical gifts of prophecy and having miraculous powers. She is honoured as a saint by the Catholic Church.

== Life ==
The chronology of her life remains uncertain, as the acts of her canonization, the chief historical sources, record no dates. Most scholars agree she was probably born around the year 1233.

Born of poor and pious parents, even as a child, Rose had a great desire to pray and to aid the poor. She prayed much for the conversion of sinners. Rose was not yet 10 years old when the Blessed Virgin Mary is said to have instructed her to take the habit of the Third Order of St. Francis and to preach penance in Viterbo, at that time under the rule of Frederick II, Holy Roman Emperor.

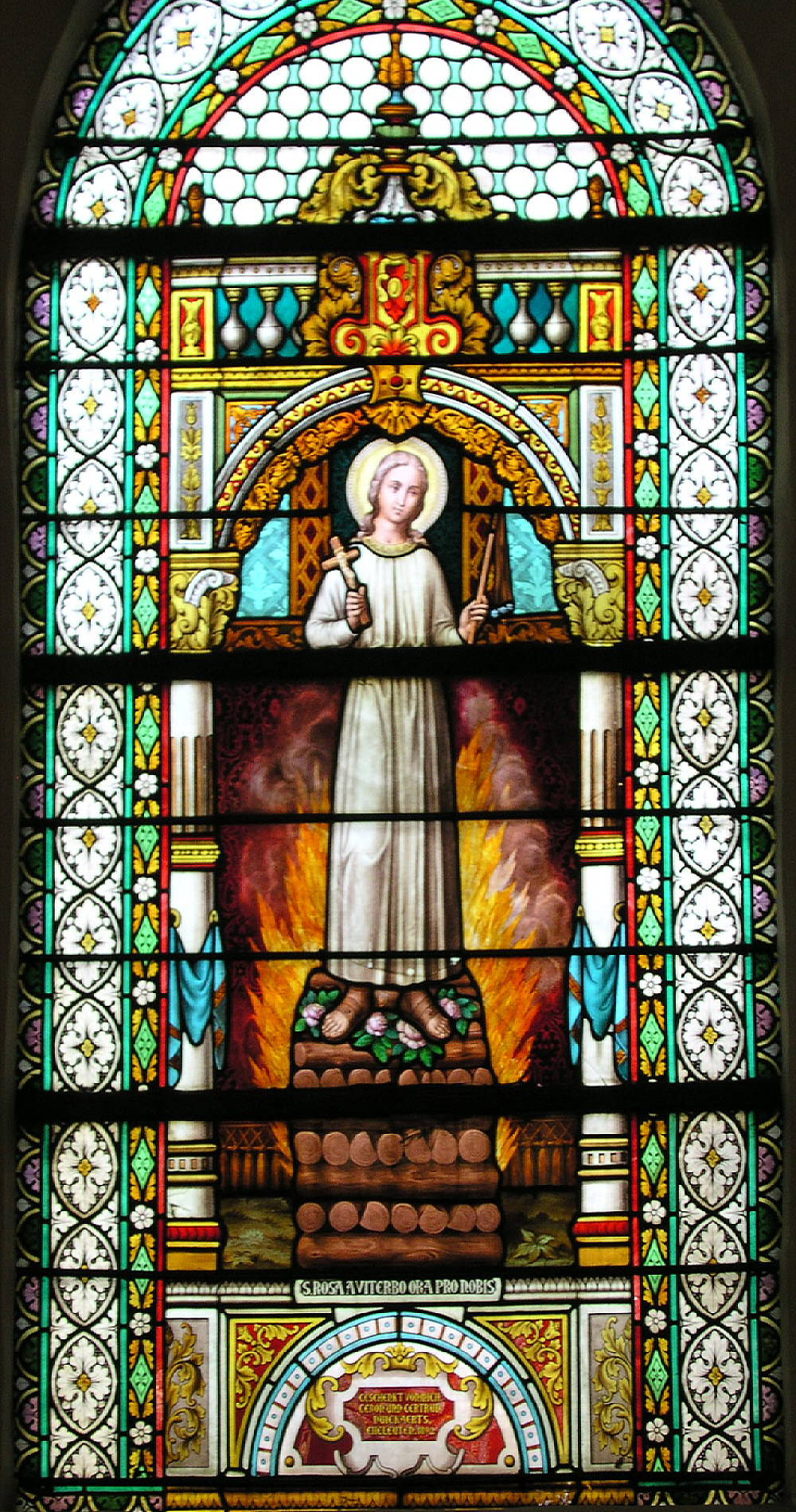
Window showing Saint Rose defying the pyre in Vitorchiano

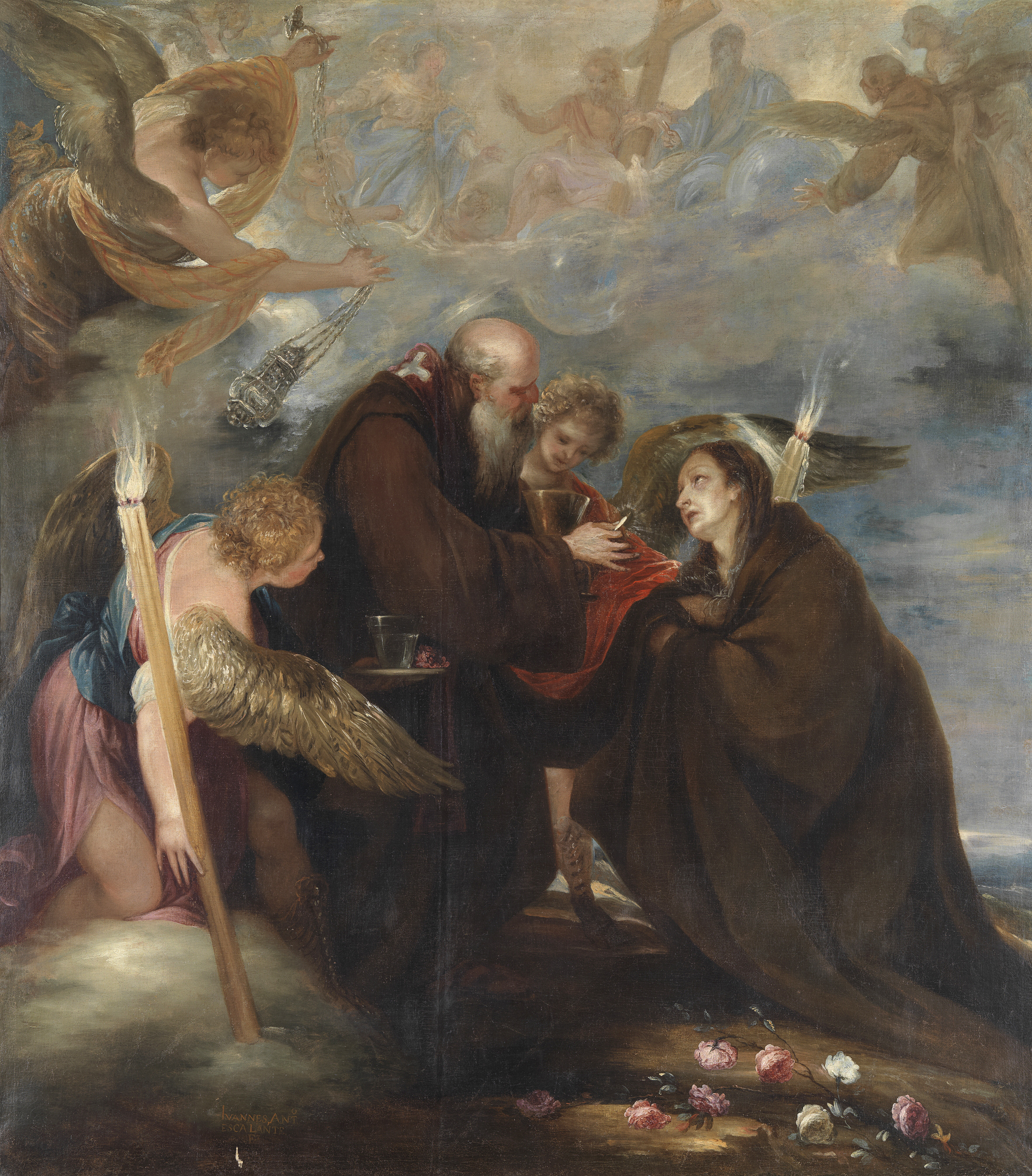
The Communion of Saint Rose of Viterbo, by Juan Antonio de Frías y Escalante

She lived a life of prayer, penance and solitude in her father's home. Every now and then she would emerge from her solitude to entreat the people to do penance. Her mission seems to have lasted for about two years. In January 1250, Viterbo, her native city, was then in revolt against the pope. When she was 12, she began preaching a message in the streets allied with Guelph aspirations, thus against Emperor Frederick's rule over Viterbo. She and her family were exiled from the city and took refuge in Soriano nel Cimino. By 1250-1251, when pope Innocent IV's faction regained power in Viterbo, Rose was allowed to return.

On December 5, 1250, Rose allegedly foretold the speedy death of the emperor, a prophecy fulfilled on December 13. Soon afterwards she went to Vitorchiano, whose inhabitants, according to surviving reports, were affected by a supposed sorceress. Rose secured the conversion of all, even of the sorceress, reportedly by standing unscathed for three hours in the flames of a burning pyre.

Rose wished to enter the Poor Clares of Saint Mary in the city, but was refused due to her poverty and thus unable to provide the dowry required for admission. She accepted her rejection nonetheless, foretelling her admission to the monastery after her death.

Rose died on March 6, 1251, in her father's home. It was long believed that Rose had died of tuberculosis, but in 2010 researchers examining her remains concluded she had died of complications due to Pentalogy of Cantrell.

== Veneration ==
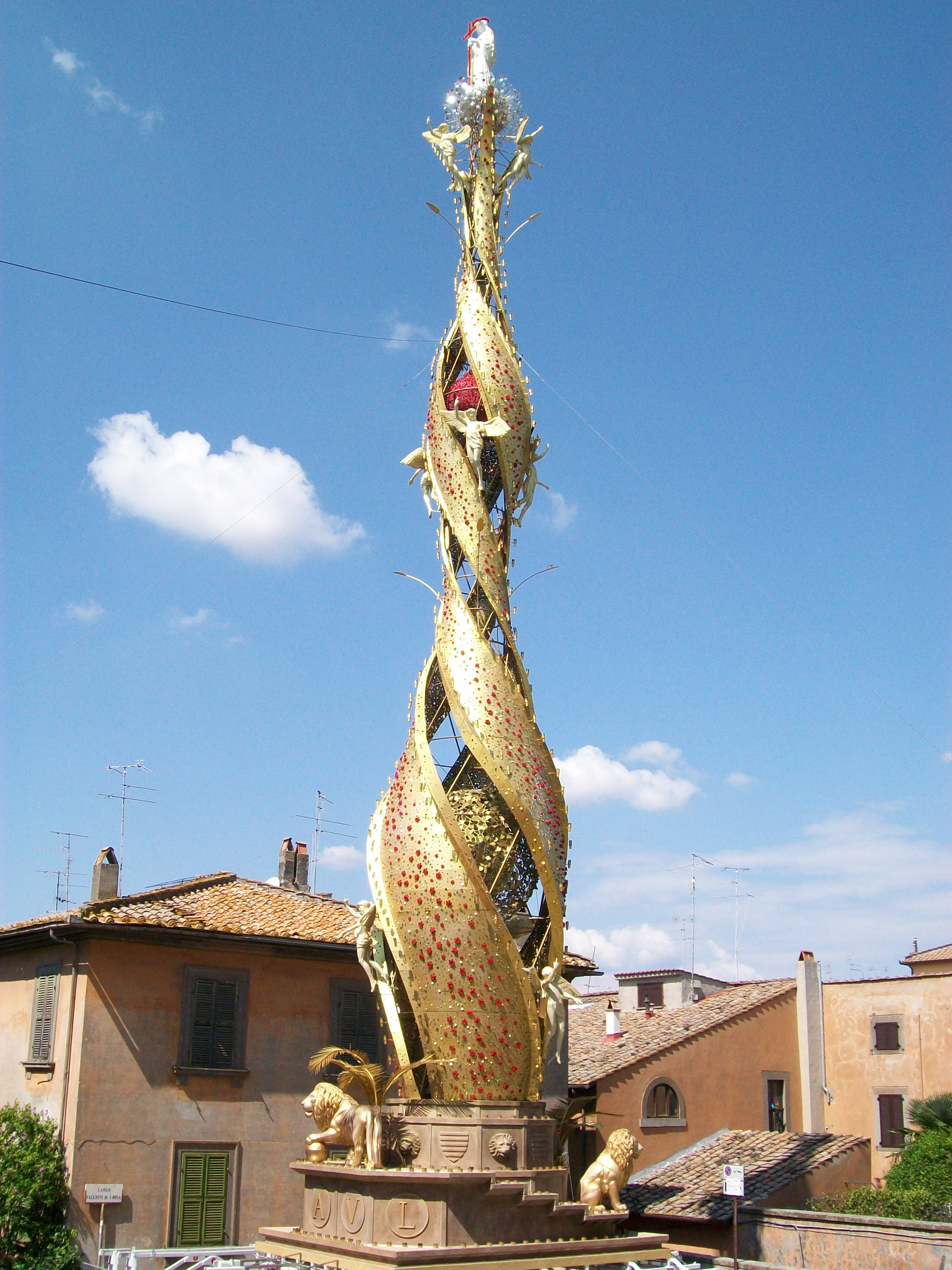
La Macchina of Saint Rose

The process of Rose's canonization was opened in the year of her death by Pope Innocent IV, but was not definitively undertaken until 1457. Originally buried in the small parish church of Santa Maria in Poggio located in Piazza della Crocetta in central Viterbo; in 1257 Pope Alexander IV ordered it moved to the monastery she had desired to enter, located a few hundred meters away from her original burial, at which time it was renamed in her honor.

When the liturgical calendar of the Roman Catholic Church was reformed after the Second Vatican Council, her feast day was transferred to the date of her death. September 4 is the date of the translation of her relics to the Monastery of St. Damian. It is this latter date on which her feast is celebrated in Viterbo and by the Franciscans.

On September 3, the eve of the feast of St. Rose, the people of Viterbo follow the transportation of La Macchina ("the Machine of St. Rose") a massive 28-metre-high (92 ft) tower, illuminated with 3,000 tiny electric lights and 880 candles, and topped off with a statue of her, which is carried for 1,200 metres through the darkened streets of the old medieval town on the backs of around 100 volunteers called "facchini". The tradition goes all the way back to September 4, 1258, when the body of the saint was exhumed and transported to the Monastery of Saint Damian; but it was not until 1664, following seven years of plague in the city, that a "machine" first appeared. In gratitude for having survived such a terrible pestilence the citizens voted to renew the veneration of their saint every year.

St. Rose of Viterbo Convent, named for her, in La Crosse, Wisconsin, is the motherhouse of the Franciscan Sisters of Perpetual Adoration. The convent is listed on the National Register of Historic Places.

Viterbo University is a Catholic, Franciscan university in the liberal arts tradition, founded by these Franciscan Sisters, also located in La Crosse, Wisconsin.

Rose of Viterbo is one of the religious figures featured in the award-winning series of saint plays by Erik Ehn. The play celebrating her life premiered in October 2008 at Goshen College.

== See also ==
- Saint Rose of Viterbo, patron saint archive

== Sources ==
- ANDREUCCI, Andrea Girolano. Notizie Critico-Istoriche Dell'Ammirabile S. Rosa Virgine Viterbese. Stamperie di Antorio di Rosse. Roma, 1750. (e-book).
- BEAUFAYS, P. Ignace (O.F.M). Sante Rose de Viterbe: Propagandiste de L’A.C.. Bruxelles, Ed, du Chant D’Oiseau, 1937.
- CENCI, Paolo. Rosa: Eroica, Giovanetta, Santa. Agnesotti, Viterbo, 1981.
- DE KERVAL, Leon. Saint Rose: sa vie et son temps. Impr. Franciscaine Missionnaire (Vanves), Paris, 1896.
- PELLEGRINI, P. Stefano. Santa Rosa e Suo Monastero. Grafiche Messaggero di S. Antonio. Padova, 1967.
- Pizzi, Storia della Città di Viterbo. (Roma, 1887).
- PIACENTINI, Ernesto (O.F.M). Il libro dei Miracoli di Santa Rosa da Viterbo. Union Printing S.p.A., Roma, 1991.
- PLENS, Frei Urbano. Santa Rosa de Viterbo. Cadernos Franciscanos: ano VI, n. 1, fascículo 29. Belo Horizonte, 1980.
