= Santa Maria in Poggio, Viterbo =

Parish church in Viterbo, Italy

Santa Maria in Poggio or Chiesa della Crocetta
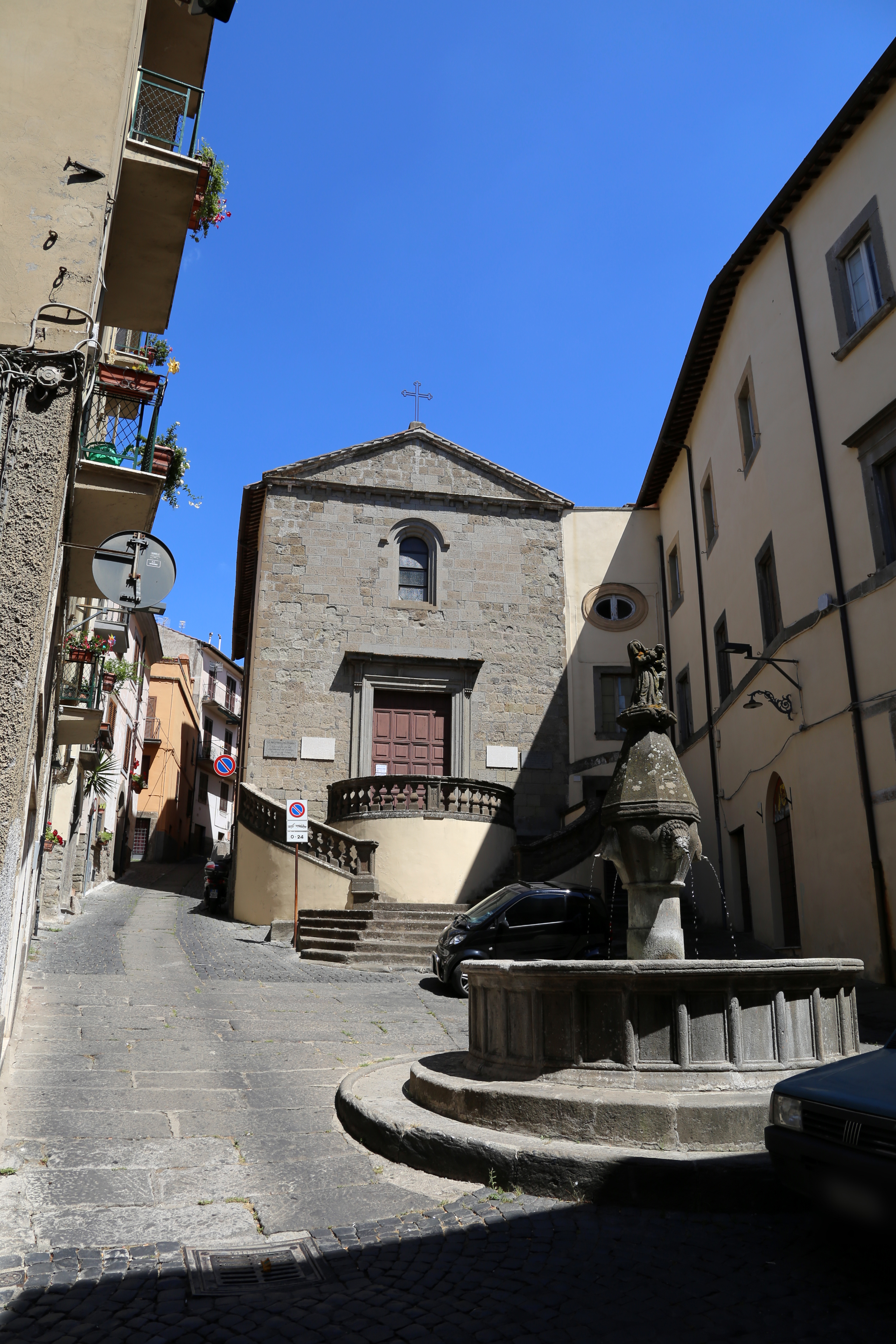
- Façade of Santa Maria in Poggio from across piazzetta with Fountain in front

Religion
- Affiliation: Roman Catholic

Location
- Location: Piazza della Crocetta, Viterbo, Lazio, Italy
- Interactive map of Santa Maria in Poggio or Chiesa della Crocetta
- Coordinates: 42.41933°N 12.10839°E

Architecture
- Type: Church

Santa Maria in Poggio (St Mary on the Hill) is a Roman Catholic parish church located in the Piazza della Crocetta in the northeastern neighborhood of historic Viterbo, region of Lazio, Italy. The church was formerly the parish of St Rose of Viterbo, and is a block south of the monastery now named after her. Initially, the saint was buried for three years in this church, but exhumed, putatively intact, and reinterred in the Monaster Santa Rosa. The piazza in front has a Renaissance-era Fountain of Santa Rosa.

== History ==
A church of this name is mentioned in documents from 1076, located in a then thinly populated district. By 1236, this had become a parish church. In that century, Rose of Viterbo was born in this parish. In the 16th-century, the bishop Sebastiano Gualterio joined the parish to that of San Matteo in Sonsa. However, the same bishop left in his inheritance money to found an institute for poor girls attached to this church. In 1558, the church was assigned to the Franciscans, who set up an adjacent school. But by the 17th century, the church and adjacent convent had been abandoned by the Franciscans and granted to an order known as Fratelli del Buon Morire (Brothers of the Good Death). In 1603, it was assigned to the Camillians, known in Italy as the Crociferi for the large red cross on their cassocks. This affiliation and the name of their adjacent hospital gave name to the Piazza della Crocetta.

In 1668, the parish church of Matteo in Sonsa was suppressed, and the parish label returned to this church. By the end of the century a school for girls was reopened in the adjacent buildings. In 1873, the church was suppressed but the Bishop Antonio Maria Grasselli refurbished the church and reconsecrated it in 1898. The church underwent further refurbishment in 1932–1934, but remained closed until a restoration in 1949. The Camillians were moved to an alternative monastery, and it has remained since a parish church.

The church has a scenographic curved staircase in front, built in the late 17th-century. The interiors are brightly painted in recent decades.
