= Aerospace architecture =

Discipline of architectural design

Aerospace architecture is broadly defined to encompass architectural design of non-habitable and habitable structures and living and working environments in aerospace-related facilities, habitats, and vehicles. These environments include, but are not limited to: science platform aircraft and aircraft-deployable systems; space vehicles, space stations, habitats and lunar and planetary surface construction bases; and Earth-based control, experiment, launch, logistics, payload, simulation and test facilities. Earth analogs to space applications may include Antarctic, desert, high altitude, underground, undersea environments and closed ecological systems.

The American Institute of Aeronautics and Astronautics (AIAA) Design Engineering Technical Committee (DETC) meets several times a year to discuss policy, education, standards, and practice issues pertaining to aerospace architecture.

== The role of appearance in aerospace architecture ==
"The role of design creates and develops concepts and specifications that seek to simultaneously and synergistically optimize function, production, value and appearance." In connection with, and with respect to, human presence and interactions, appearance is a component of human factors and includes considerations of human characteristics, needs and interests.

Appearance in this context refers to all visual aspects – the statics and dynamics of form(s), color(s), patterns, and textures in respect to all products, systems, services, and experiences. Appearance/Aesthetics affects humans both psychologically and physiologically and can affect improving both human efficiency, attitude, and well-being.

In reference to non-habitable design the influence of appearance is minimal if not non-existent. However, as the industry of aerospace continues to rapidly grow, and missions to put humans on Mars and back to the Moon are being announced. The role that appearance/aesthetics to maintain crew well-being and health of multi-month or year missions becomes a monumental factor in mission success.

== Habitable structures within Earth's atmosphere ==
Although the overall metrics and fundamentals are by far some of the most key elements in aerospace architecture, there are also other factors that focus more on appearance and comfort while keeping a relative balance with other important design factors. These metrics for atmospheric flight consist of overall factors directed toward productivity and safety, and environmental issues such as noise, emissions, accessibility, and affordability. However, technological parameters such as space, weight, drag minimization, and propulsion efficiency highly dictate and restrain the boundaries of structure design. Major factors that need to be considered in atmospheric flight design include productibility, maintainability, reliability, flyability, inspectability, flexibility, repairability, operability, durability, and airport compatibility.

== Habitable structures outside of low-Earth orbit (LEO) ==
What is different concerning space in reference to human-centered design thinking is the nearly complete lack of human presence. Human-centered design influence wholly operates within the context of human interactions; It affects how operations or missions are run (operability), or how products, systems, services, or experiences (PSSE's) affect end users (usability). Currently, the human presence involves the International Space Station and the relatively few international rocket systems.

=== Human-centered design ===
Due to the large space boom and technological advancements over the past decade, numerous countries and companies have released statements that human expeditions in the Solar System are "far from done". With long duration confinement in limited interior space in micro-gravity with little-to-no real variability in environment, attention towards crew well-being and mental alertness will pose complex human-centered design issues. Mars transit vehicles and surface habitats will constitute highly confined, technical settings characterized by social, emotional and physical deprivation while affording little opportunity to experience privacy and environmental variation. Aesthetic and appearance measures for human exploration will emphasize upon “naturalistic countermeasures” to the multitudinous stresses of such expeditions. A study conducted in 1989 found that when given multiple photographs and paintings as potential decoration for the International Space Station (ISS), crew test subjects all individually preferred those with naturalistic, irrespective themes, and a large depth of field. Other examples of human-centered design include using pastel paints on the ISS to contrast and provide “up or down” cues in micro-gravity environments, or the concept of dynamically and spatially adjusting lighting color and intensities to conform to daily and even seasonal biorhythms similar to earth to mitigate the societal separation effects experienced in space.

Although human wants, needs, and limitations both physically and mentally need to be evaluated and addressed when designing for space, design decisions must at least co-exist, if not be synergistic, with the overall metrics of aerospace engineering design (Ex. The toilet on the International Space Station). Human factors and habitability design are important topics for all working and living spaces; For space exploration, they are vital. While human factors and certain habitability issues have been integrated into the design process of crewed spacecraft, there is a crucial need to move from mere survivability to factors that support thriving. As of today, the risk of an incompatible vehicle or habitat design has already been identified by NASA as a recognized key risk to human health and performance in space. Habitability and human factors will become even more important determinants for the design of future long-term and commercial space facilities as larger and more diverse groups occupy off-earth habitats.

== See also ==
- Airborne observatory
- Atmosphere of Venus
- High Altitude Venus Operational Concept (HAVOC)
- Colonization of Venus
- Floating cities and islands in fiction
