= Terry =

- Pronunciation: /ˈtɛri/ TERR-ee
- Gender: Unisex (mostly male)
- Language: English

Origin
- Languages: 1. Latin; 2. Greek; 3. English
- Origin: Diminutive form of Terence and Teresa
- Region of origin: English-speaking world

Other names
- Alternative spelling: Terrie; Terri; Teri
- Related names: Terence, Teresa, Terrance, Terrence

Terry is a unisex diminutive nickname for the given names Teresa or Theresa (feminine) or Terence, Terrance (masculine).

== Male ==
- Terry A. Canales, American politician
- Terry A. Davis (1969–2018), American electrical engineer, computer programmer, creator of TempleOS
- Terry A. Doughty (born 1959), American district judge
- Terry A. D. Strickland (born 1992), American convicted murderer
- Terry A. Osborn, American academic and professor of education
- Terry A. Simmons (1946–2020), Canadian-American lawyer and cultural geographer
- Terry A. White (born 1959), American prelate
- Terry A. Willkom (born 1943), American former politician
- Terry A. Yonkers (born 1949), American former Air Force civilian
- Terry Ablade (born 2001), Ghanaian-born Finnish professional footballer
- Terry Abram (born 1947), American retired ice hockey player and coach
- Terry Acox (born 1969), American former professional basketball player
- Terry Adail, birth name of Doc Terry (1921–2001), American blues musician
- Terry Adams, several people
- Terry Adamson (born 1948), English former professional footballer
- Terry Addison (born 1946), Australian former international tennis player
- Terry Adevoso (1922–1975), Filipino war hero
- Terry Adkins (1953–2014), American artist and professor of arts
- Terry Adlington (1935–1994), English professional football
- Terry Ahola, American former alpine skier
- Terry Albritton (1955–2005), American shot putter, former world record holder, and coach
- Terry Alcock (born 1946), English former footballer
- Terry Alderman (born 1956), Australian former international cricketer
- Terry Alderton (born 1970), English comedian
- Terry Alexander, several people
- Terry Alfriend, American engineer and professor
- Terry Allcock (1935–2024), English professional footballer
- Terry Allen, several people
- Terry Allvord, American sports industry executive
- Terry Amburgey, American engineer and professor
- Terry Anderson, several people
- Terry Andrysiak (born 1965), American former college football player
- Terry Antonis (born 1993), Australian soccer player
- Terry Apala (born 1988), Nigerian musician
- Terry Armstrong (born 1958), English former footballer
- Terry Armstrong (basketball) (born 2000), American NBL player
- Terry Arthur (1940–2022), English international rugby union player
- Terry Atkinson (born 1939), English artist
- Terry Aulich (born 1945), Australian former politician
- Terry Austin, several people
- Terry Backer (1954–2015), American politician
- Terry Baddoo, English-born American television executive and former TV host
- Terry Bailey (born 1947), English former footballer
- Terry Baker (disambiguation), several people
- Terry Ball (disambiguation), several people
- Terry Balsamo (born 1972), American musician; past member of bands Cold (band), Evanescence, and Limp Bizkit
- Terry Bamford (1942–2020), British social worker and writer
- Terry Barber, American countertenor
- Terry Barker, British economist
- Terry Barnes (1945–2020), English cricketer
- Terry Barnes (Warwickshire cricketer) (born 1933), English former cricketer
- Terry Barr (1935–2009), American NFL player
- Terry Barratt (born 1971), English former cricketer
- Terry Barrett (1945–2023), American art critic and professor emeritus
- Terry Bartlett (born 1963), English retired gymnast
- Terry Bartlett (footballer) (born 1948), English former footballer
- Terry Barwell (born 1937), South African-born English cricketer
- Terry Barwick (born 1983), English football manager and former professional player
- Terry Batt (born 1949), Australian artist and sculptor
- Terry Baucom (1952–2023), American bluegrass singer, banjo player, and band leader
- Terry Baxter (born 1957), American politician
- Terry Bean, American political fundraiser, civil rights activist, and LGBT rights movement activist
- Terry Beasley (1950–2024), American NFL player
- Terry Beatty (born 1958), American comic artist
- Terry Beauford (born 1968), American former NFL-, CFL-, and AFL player and coach
- Terry Becker (1921–2014), American film- and television actor, director, and producer
- Terry Beckner (born 1997), American professional football player
- Terry Beddard (1901–1966), British fencer
- Terry Beech (born 1981), Canadian businessman and politician
- Terry Beers (1925–2015), Australian rugby league footballer
- Terry Beeson (born 1955), American former NFL player
- Terry Belanger (born 1941), American university professor emeritus
- Terry Bell (disambiguation), several people
- Terry Benedict, American film producer
- Terry Benton (born 1942), Australian former VFL player
- Terry Betts (born 1943), English former international speedway rider
- Terry Beucher (born 1937), American former javelin thrower
- Terry Bevington (born 1956), American former MLB manager
- Terry Bickers (born 1965), English musician and songwriter
- Terry Biddlecombe (1941–2014), English National Hunt racing jockey
- Terry Bidiak (born 1945), Canadian former soccer player
- Terry Biggs, Australian Paralympic table tennis player, athlete, and administrator
- Terry Billups (born 1975), American former NFL player
- Terry Bishop (1912–1981), British screenwriter, and television- and film director
- Terry Bisson (1942–2024), American science fiction- and fantasy author
- Terry Bivins (born 1943), American retired NASCAR driver
- Terry Black (1949–2009), Canadian pop singer and teen idol
- Terry Black (Canadian football) (born 1947), Canadian former CFL player
- Terry Blackwood, American musician; member of Christian pop act The Imperials
- Terry Blade, American multidisciplinary artist and singer-songwriter
- Terry Blair (disambiguation), several people
- Terry Bledsoe (1934–2015), American sportswriter and NFL executive
- Terry Blocker (born 1959), American former MLB player
- Terry Bly (1935–2009), English footballer
- Terry Board (disambiguation), several people
- Terry Boers, American sports talk show host
- Terry Bogener (born 1955), American former MLB player
- Terry Bollea (1953–2025), birth name of American professional wrestler, Hulk Hogan
- Terry Bolin (1935–2022), Australian gastroenterologist
- Terry Bollinger (born 1955), American computer scientist
- Terry Bonchaka (1982–2003), Ghanaian hiplife artist
- Terry Boose (born 1956), American former politician
- Terry Borcheller (born 1966), American professional racing driver
- Terry Borman, American violinmaker
- Terry Boss (born 1981), American soccer coach and former professional player
- Terry Bouhraoua (born 1987), French rugby union- and rugby union sevens player
- Terry Bouricius (born 1954), American politician
- Terry Bourke (1940–2002), Australian journalist, screenwriter, producer, and director
- Terry Bowden (born 1956), American college football coach and former player
- Terry Boy (born 1966), Japanese professional wrestler
- Terry Boyd (born 1969), American former basketball player
- Terry Boyes (1936–2017), English swimmer
- Terry Boyle (born 1958), Welsh former professional footballer
- Terry Boyle (Australian footballer) (1920–1977), Australian VFL player
- Terry Bozeman (born 1950), American actor
- Terry Bozzio (born 1950), American drummer
- Terry Bradbury (born 1939), English former professional footballer
- Terry Bradds (born 1946), American guitarist
- Terry Bradley (born 1965), Northern Irish artist
- Terry Bradshaw (born 1948), American former NFL player
- Terry Bradshaw (baseball) (born 1969), American MLB coach and former player
- Terry Bradway (born 1955), American NFL executive
- Terry Brady, Irish-born English retired businessman and former chairman
- Terry Brady (footballer) (born 1944), Australian former VFL player
- Terry Brahm (born 1962), American former long-distance runner
- Terry Brain (1907–1984), Australian VFL player
- Terry Brain Jr. (born 1938), Australian former VFL player
- Terry Brain (animator) (1955–2016), English animator
- Terry Bramall (born 1942), British businessman and philanthropist
- Terry Brands (born 1968), American Olympic wrestler
- Terry Branstad (born 1946), American politician and former diplomat
- Terry Branston (1938–2010), English footballer
- Terry Braunstein (born 1939), Canadian retired curler
- Terry Brennan (1928–2021), American college football player and coach
- Terry Brennan (politician) (1942–2020), Irish politician
- Terry Breverton (born 1946), Welsh former businessman and writer
- Terry Bright (born 1958), Australian former VFL player
- Terry Brighton (born 1949), British military historian and author
- Terry Brisley (born 1950), English former footballer
- Terry Britten (born 1947), English-Australian singer-songwriter and record producer
- Terry Broadhurst (born 1988), American DEL player
- Terry Brooke (born 1940), English former international rugby union player
- Terry Brooks (born 1944), American fantasy writer
- Terry Brooks (basketball) (born c. 1967), American former college basketball player
- Terry Bross (born 1966), American former MLB pitcher
- Terry Brotherstone, Scottish historian
- Terry Brown (disambiguation), several people
- Terry Bruce (disambiguation), several people
- Terry Brunk (born 1964), American professional wrestler
- Terry Buck (1943–2005), Australian swimmer and coach
- Terry Buckle (1940–2020), Canadian Anglican bishop
- Terry Buddin, Australian former Supreme Court judge
- Terry Budge, Australian banking executive
- Terry Buffalo Ware, American guitarist and composer
- Terry Bulling, real name of Bud Bulling (1952–2014), American MLB player
- Terry Bullivant (born 1956), English football manager
- Terry Bulloch (1916–2014), British World War II bomber pilot
- Terry Bunting (born c. 1935), Canadian retired footballer
- Terry Burgess (disambiguation), several people
- Terry Burke (born 1942), Western Australian former politician
- Terry Burns (disambiguation), several people
- Terry Burrows, English author, multi-instrumental musician, broadcaster, and producer
- Terry Burrows (baseball) (born 1968), American former MLB pitcher
- Terry Burrus, American keyboardist, composer, DJ, record producer, conductor, business, and realty- and fashion designer executive
- Terry Burton (born 1952), English football manager and coach
- Terry C. Burton (born 1956), American politician
- Terry Bush (1943–2018), English professional footballer
- Terry Bussey (born 2006), American football player
- Terry Butcher (born 1958), English football manager and former player
- Terry Butler (disambiguation), several people
- Terry L. Butts (born 1944), justice of the Supreme Court of Alabama
- Terry Byrne (born 1966), English football manager and businessman
- Terry Bywater (born 1983), British wheelchair basketball player
- Terry C. Burton (born 1956), American politician
- Terry C. Muck (born 1947), American Christian scholar and academic
- Terry C W Wong (born 1984), Hong Kong jockey
- Terry Caffery (1949–2022), Canadian WHA- and NHL player
- Terry Caffey, American victim of attempted murder
- Terry Cafolla (born 1969), Northern Irish screenwriter
- Terry Cahill (disambiguation), several people
- Terry Caldwell (born 1938), English former professional footballer
- Terry Callaghan (born 1945), British biologist
- Terry Callan (born 1938), Australian former VFL player
- Terry Callier (1945–2012), American soul-, folk-, and jazz guitarist and singer-songwriter
- Terry Calloway (born 1954), American former politician
- Terry Calvani (born 1947), American lawyer, former government official, and university professor
- Terry Cameron (born 1946), South Australian former politician
- Terry Camilleri (born 1949), Maltese-born Australian actor
- Terry Campbell (born 1968), Canadian-born German former DEL player
- Terry Campbell, American political candidate
- Terry Campese (born 1984), Australian former professional rugby league footballer
- Terry Canales (born 1979), American politician and attorney
- Terry Capp, Canadian Drag racer
- Terry Carisse (1942–2005), Canadian country singer
- Terry Carkner (born 1966), Canadian former NHL player
- Terry Carling (born 1939), English former footballer
- Terry Carpenter (1900–1978), American politician
- Terry Carr (1937–1987), American science fiction fan, author, editor, and writing instructor
- Terry Carter (1928–2024), American actor and filmmaker
- Terry Casey (disambiguation), several people
- Terry Cashion (1921–2011), Australian VFL player
- Terry Cashman (born 1941), American record producer and singer-songwriter
- Terry Catledge (born 1963), American former NBA-, PBL-, and CBA player
- Terry Caulley (born 1984), American former CFL player
- Terry Cavanagh (disambiguation), several people
- Terry Chambers (born 1955), English drummer; past member of rock band XTC
- Terry Chandler, British officer of Committee of 100 (United Kingdom)
- Terry Charles (born 1979), American former NFL player
- Terry Charman (1950–2019), English historian, museum curator, and author
- Terry Chen (born 1975), Canadian actor
- Terry Childs (disambiguation), several people
- Terry Chimes (born 1956), English musician, drummer, and chiropractor
- Terry Christian (born 1960), English broadcaster, journalist, and author
- Terry Christie (born 1942), Scottish former footballer and manager
- Terry Christman (born 1943), American former athlete
- Terry Cisco, American electrical engineer
- Terry Clancy (born 1943), Canadian former NHL player
- Terry Clark (disambiguation), several people
- Terry Clarke (disambiguation), several people
- Terry Clawson (1940–2013), English professional rugby league footballer
- Terry Clifford (born 1938), Canadian former educator and politician
- Terry Cline (born 1958), American psychologist and public health policy specialist
- Terry Cobner (born 1946), Welsh former international rugby union player
- Terry Cochrane (born 1953), Northern Irish former footballer
- Terry Cochrane (Canadian football) (born 1963), Canadian former CFL player
- Terry Coe, Niuean politician and former cabinet minister
- Terry Cole, several people
- Terry Coldwell, English member of pop boy band East 17
- Terry Coleman (born 1943), American politician
- Terry Collins (born 1949), American former MLB manager
- Terry Coner (born 1964), American basketball coach and former professional player
- Terry Connell (1855–1924), American MLB player and umpire
- Terry Connolly (1958–2007), Australian politician and judge
- Terry Connor (born 1962), English football coach and former professional footballer
- Terry Conroy (born 1946), Irish former professional footballer
- Terry Considine (born 1947), American businessman and politician
- Terry Constantinou (born 1989), Australian international rugby league footballer
- Terry Cook (disambiguation), several people
- Terry Cooke (born 1976), English former professional footballer
- Terry Cooke (footballer, born 1962) (born 1962), Welsh footballer
- Terry Cooney (1933–2022), American MLB umpire
- Terry Cooper (disambiguation), several people
- Terry Copley (disambiguation), several people
- Terry Copp (born 1938), Canadian military historian and university professor emeritus
- Terry Corey Brennan (born 1959), American professor, guitarist, and songwriter
- Terry Cornutt (born 1952), American MLB pitcher
- Terry Corso, American member of rock band Alien Ant Farm
- Terry Cottam, English guitar player, composer, and teacher
- Terry Cotton (born 1946), English former footballer
- Terry Cousin (born 1975), American former NFL player
- Terry Cox (born 1937), English drummer
- Terry Cox (baseball) (born 1949), American former MLB player
- Terry Crabb (born 1976), New Zealand former cricketer
- Terry Craft (born 1954), American former MLB umpire
- Terry Crapo (1939–1982), American attorney, educator, and politician
- Terry Cress, Canadian truck driver; contestant on Canada's Worst Handyman 2
- Terry Crews (born 1968), American actor, television host, and former NFL player
- Terry Crisp (born 1943), Canadian former NHL player and coach
- Terry Crook (born 1947), English former professional rugby league footballer
- Terry Crosby (born 1957), American former NBA player
- Terry Crouch (1959–2011), American NFL- and USFL player
- Terry Crowley (disambiguation), several people
- Terry Crummitt (1972–2004), American actor
- Terry Cryer (1934–2017), British jazz- and blues photographer
- Terry Cummings (born 1961), American former NBA player
- Terry Curley (1938–2016), Australian rugby union international
- Terry Curran (born 1955), English former professional footballer
- Terry Curran (footballer, born 1940) (1940–2000), English professional footballer
- Terry Cutler, Canadian cyber security expert and teacher
- Terry Daly (born 1953), Irish former association footballer
- Terry Dance (born 1952), Canadian former Anglican bishop
- Terry Daniel, American former college football punter
- Terry Daniels, American retired professional wrestler
- Terry Daniher (born 1957), Australian former AFL player
- Terry Danko (born 1949), Canadian musician and songwriter
- Terry Danyluk (born 1960), Canadian volleyball general manager and former player
- Terry Darlington, Welsh author
- Terry Darracott (1950–2022), English professional footballer
- Terry Darnell Edwards (?–2017), American man who was executed
- Terry Date (born 1956), American record producer and audio engineer
- Terry Davey (born 1950), Australian former VFL player
- Terry David Mulligan (born 1942), Canadian actor and radio- and television personality
- Terry Davies (disambiguation), several people
- Terry Davis, several people
- Terry Day (born 1940), English musician, poet, and visual artist
- Terry Day (American football) (born 1974), American former NFL player
- Terry Day (rugby league) (born 1953), English former professional rugby league footballer
- Terry Deering (1958–1997), American politician and coal miner
- Terry DeGeus, American drug dealer
- Terry Deglau (1940–2019), American portrait photographer
- Terry de Havilland (1938–2019), English shoe designer
- Terry Dehere (born 1971), American former NBA player
- Terry Deitz (born 1959) American retired U.S. Navy pilot, television host, and contestant on Survivor (American TV series)
- Terry De Koning (born 1961), Australian former VFL player
- Terry Delancy (born 1994), Bahamian footballer
- Terry Dempsey (1932–2023), American politician
- Terry Dempsey (songwriter) (1941–2019), South African songwriter
- Terry Dene (born 1938), English rock music singer
- Terry Denison (born c. 1947), Canadian politician
- Terry Dennis (born 1961), Canadian provincial politician
- Terry Denton (born 1950), Australian illustrator and author
- Terry deRoy Gruber, American photographer, author, and filmmaker
- Terry Desmond Macfarlane (born 1953), Western Australian botanist and taxonomist
- Terry Devery (born 1938), Australian former VFL player
- Terry Devlin (born 2003), Northern Irish footballer
- Terry Dicks (1937–2020), British politician
- Terry Diehl (born 1949), American professional golfer
- Terry Dill (born 1939), American professional golfer
- Terry Lee Dill, American sculptor
- Terry Dillon (1941–1964), American NFL player
- Terry Dion (born 1957), American former NFL player
- Terry Dischinger (1940–2023), American NBA player
- Terry Disley, English jazz keyboardist and composer
- Terry Dixon (born 1990), English professional footballer
- Terry Dixon (artist) (1969–2019), American visual artist
- Terry Dixon (boxer) (born 1966), Jamaican boxer
- Terry Dobson, several people
- Terry Dodson, American comic book artist and penciller
- Terry Dolan, several people
- Terry Domburg (born 1960), Australian former VFL player
- Terry Donahoe (1944–2005), Canadian politician
- Terry Donahue (1944–2021), American football coach and executive
- Terry Donnelly, Canadian journalist
- Terry Donovan, several people
- Terry Don Phillips, American former college athletics administrator
- Terry Doran (1939–2020), English luxury car dealer, pop music manager, and music publishing executive
- Terry Dowdall (born 1964/1965), Canadian politician
- Terry Dowling (born 1947), Australian writer and journalist
- Terry Downes (1936–2017), English boxer, film actor, and businessman
- Terry Doyle (born 1985), American former NPB pitcher
- Terry Dozier (born 1966), American former NBA- and NBL player and coach
- Terry Drainey (born 1949), English Catholic prelate
- Terry Draper (born 1951), Canadian musician; past member of rock group Klaatu (band)
- Terry Drinkwater (1936–1989), American television- and radio journalist
- Terry Driscoll (born 1947), American former college athletics administrator and NBA player
- Terry Driver (1965–2021), Canadian murderer
- Terry Druggan (1903–1954), Irish-American mobster
- Terry Dubrow (born 1958), American plastic surgeon and television personality
- Terry Duddy, British former chief executive of Argos (retailer)
- Terry Duerod (1956–2020), American NBA-, CBA-, and LBA player
- Terry Duffin (born 1982), Zimbabwean former international cricketer
- Terry Duffy (1922–1985), British trade union leader
- Terry Duggan (1932–2008), English comedian and actor
- Terry Duguid (born 1954/1955), Canadian politician
- Terry Dunfield (born 1982), Canadian former soccer player, coach, and pundit; current soccer analyst and colour commentator
- Terry Dunleavy (1928–2022), New Zealand wine industry leader, politician, and columnist
- Terry Dunn (born 1953), American former college basketball coach
- Terry Dunstan (born 1968), English former boxer
- Terry Durham (1936–2013), English abstract- and figurative artist and poet
- Terry Dyer (born 1977), Dominican former international footballer
- Terry Dykstra, American role-playing game artist
- Terry Dyson (born 1934), English retired footballer
- Terry Eades (1944–2021), Northern Irish professional footballer
- Terry Eagleton (born 1943), English philosopher, literary theorist, critic, public intellectual, and professor
- Terry Eames (born 1957), English football manager and former professional player
- Terry Eastwood (born 1943), Canadian archivist
- Terry Eccles (born 1952), English former footballer
- Terry Echols (born 1962), American former NFL player
- Terry Edwards (born 1960), English musician
- Terry Ellis (music producer) (born 1943), English record producer and manager
- Terry Elton, American professor of pharmacology
- Terry Emmert, American businessman, entrepreneur, and sports franchise owner
- Terry England (born 1966), American politician
- Terry English, British armourer and costume designer
- Terry Envoh, Nigerian footballer
- Terry Enyart (1950–2007), American MLB pitcher
- Terry Erwin (1940–2020), American entomologist
- Terry Erwin (American football) (born 1946), American former NFL player
- Terry Etim (born 1986), English retired professional mixed martial artist
- Terry Evans, several people
- Terry Evanshen (born 1944), Canadian motivational speaker and former CFL player
- Terry Evanswood (born 1970), American professional magician and illusionist
- Terry Everett (1937–2024), American politician
- Terry Eviston (born 1957), Irish former footballer and current manager
- Terry Ewasiuk (born 1953), Canadian former NHL player and current head coach
- Terry F. Moorer (born 1961), American district judge
- Terry Fahey (born 1954), Australian former professional rugby league footballer
- Terry Fair (born 1976), American former NFL player and coach
- Terry Fair (basketball) (1960–2020), American-Israeli professional basketball player
- Terry Falcon (born 1955), American former NFL- and USFL player
- Terry Falk, American politician
- Terry Fallis (born 1959), Canadian writer and public relations consultant
- Terry Fan, American-born Canadian children's book writer and illustrator
- Terry Fanolua (born 1974), Samoan rugby union player
- Terry Farley, English DJ, remixer, and producer
- Terry Farman (born 1946), Australian former VFL player
- Terry Farmer (1931–2014), English footballer
- Terry Farnsworth (born 1942), Canadian former Olympic judoka
- Terry Farrell, several people
- Terry Fator (born 1965), American ventriloquist, impressionist, stand-up comedian, and singer
- Terry Fearnley (1933–2015), Australian rugby league footballer and coach
- Terry Felix (born 1959), Canadian retired NASL player
- Terry Fell (1921–2007), American country musician
- Terry Felton (born 1957), American former MLB pitcher
- Terry Fenton (born 1940), Canadian artist, author, critic, and curator
- Terry Fenwick (born 1959), English former football manager and player
- Terry Ferguson, Irish former sportsperson
- Terry Fields (1937–2008), English politician and firefighter
- Terry Fields (Florida politician) (1959–2026), American politician
- Terry Fincher (1931–2008), British photojournalist
- Terry Fisher, several people
- Terry Fitzgerald, several people
- Terry Flanagan, several people
- Terry Fleming (born 1973), English football manager and coach, and former professional player
- Terry Flew, Australian media- and communications scholar and professor
- Terry Flynn, British founder of the November 9th Society
- Terry Fogerty (1944–2013), English professional rugby league footballer
- Terry Fontenot (born 1980), American NFL executive and general manager
- Terry Forcum (1942–2022), American professional golfer
- Terry Forman (born 1948), Australian former international rugby union player
- Terry Forrest, Australian lawyer and Supreme Court justice
- Terry Forrestal (1948–2000), English actor, stuntman, and BASE jumper
- Terry Forster (born 1952), American former MLB relief pitcher
- Terry Fossum, American actor, producer, and businessman
- Terry Foster, American sports columnist and radio personality
- Terry Fox, several people
- Terry Francis (born 1966), English tech house DJ and producer
- Terry Francois (c. 1922–1989), African American attorney, civil rights activist, and politician
- Terry Francona (born 1959), American MLB manager and former player
- Terry Franklin, American singer and songwriter of contemporary Christian music
- Terry Frazee, American special effects artist
- Terry Frazier, English professional wrestler
- Terry Freeman (born 1931), English former cricketer
- Terry French, several people
- Terry Friedman (1940–2013), American-born English art- and architectural historian and museum curator
- Terry Friesz, American academic and professor
- Terry Frost (1915–2003), English abstract artist
- Terry Frost (actor) (1906–1993), American actor
- Terry Fugate-Wilcox (born 1944), American painter and sculptor
- Terry Fullerton (born 1953), English former kart racer and driver manager
- Terry Fulton (1930–2022), Australian VFL player
- Terry Funk (1944–2023), American professional wrestler
- Terry Furlow (1954–1980), American NBA player
- Terry G (born 1986), Nigerian rapper, singer, songwriter, and record executive
- Terry Gabinski (born 1938), American former politician and teacher
- Terry Gagnon (born 1962), Canadian volleyball player
- Terry Gajraj, Guyanese chutney and chutney-soca artist
- Terry Gale (born 1946), Australian professional golfer
- Terry Gannon (born 1963), American sportscaster
- Terry Garbett (born 1945), English retired footballer
- Terry Gardiner (born 1950), American former politician
- Terry Garland (1953–2021), American blues guitarist, songwriter, and singer
- Terry Garnett (born 1967), English former rugby union player
- Terry Garrison (born 1949), American politician
- Terry Garthwaite, American past member of music ensemble Joy of Cooking (band)
- Terry Garvin (1937–1998), Canadian professional wrestler
- Terry Gathercole (1935–2001), Australian breaststroke swimmer
- Terry Gauthier (born 1957), American politician
- Terry Gay (born 1947), Australian former VFL player
- Terry Geary, Australian former professional rugby league footballer
- Terry Gennoe (born 1953), English former professional footballer
- Terry George (born 1952), Northern Irish screenwriter and director
- Terry George (entrepreneur) (born 1965), English businessman
- Terry Gestrin, American politician
- Terry Gibbs (born 1924), American jazz vibraphonist and band leader
- Terry Gibbs (wrestler) (born 1953), American retired professional wrestler
- Terry Gibson (born 1962), English former professional footballer
- Terry Gibson (priest) (1937–2015), British senior Anglican priest
- Terry Giddy (1950–2023), Australian Paralympic athlete
- Terry Gifford (born 1946), British scholar and poet
- Terry Gilkyson (1916–1999), American folk singer and songwriter
- Terry Gill (1939–2015), English Australian actor, theatre owner, producer, director, and writer
- Terry Gilliam (born 1940), British-American filmmaker, comedian, collage animator, and actor; past member of comedy troupe Monty Python
- Terry Gilroy (1902–1982), New Zealand rugby union- and professional rugby league footballer
- Terry Gipson (born 1963), American politician
- Terry Glavin (born 1955), British-born Canadian author and journalist
- Terry Glaze (born 1964), American singer and musician; member of hard rock band Lord Tracy; past member of heavy metal band Pantera
- Terry Gleeson (1933–2011), Australian VFL player
- Terry Glenn (1974–2017), American NFL player
- Terry Glenville (1943–2021), English swimmer
- Terry Glynn (born 1958), English former professional footballer
- Terry Goddard (born 1947), American attorney and politician
- Terry Godwin (born 1996), American NFL- and CFL player
- Terry Goggin (born 1941), American author, businessman, educator, and politician
- Terry Golway, American historian, author, and journalist
- Terry Goode (born 1961), English former professional footballer
- Terry Goodin (born 1966), American politician
- Terry Gooding (1931–2018), Welsh professional boxer
- Terry Goodkind (1948–2020), American writer
- Terry Gordy (1961–2001), American professional wrestler
- Terry Gornell (born 1989), English former footballer
- Terry Gou (born 1950), Taiwanese billionaire businessman and politician
- Terry Gould, Canadian author and investigative journalist
- Terry Gowan, American member of rock band Styx (band)
- Terry Grant, several people
- Terry Gray, several people
- Terry Greedy (born 1955), Australian retired NSL player
- Terry Green (born 1951), British businessman
- Terry Greene, English artist
- Terry Greer (born 1957), American former CFL- and NFL player
- Terry Gregg (born 1950), British field hockey player
- Terry Gregson (born 1953), Canadian retired NHL referee
- Terry Grier (1936–2023), Canadian politician, lecturer, and university administrator
- Terry Grier (superintendent), American school superintendent
- Terry Griffiths (1947–2024), Welsh professional snooker player, coach, and pundit
- Terry Griffiths (politician) (1944–2009), Australian politician
- Terry Griffiths, Australian police officer
- Terry Groom (1944–2021), South Australian politician
- Terry Grossman, American author
- Terry Grosz (1941–2019), American game warden
- Terry Groves (born 1946), Manx politician
- Terry Guess (born 1974), American former NFL player
- Terry Guiel, Canadian candidate in the 2010 Peterborough County municipal elections
- Terry Gunawardena, Sri Lankan military personnel
- Terry Gunn (1935–2021), English cricketer
- Terry Gurnett (born 1955), American college women's soccer head coach
- Terry Gygar (1947–2024), Australian soldier, calligraphist, and professor
- Terry H. Cahal (1802–1851), American jurist and politician
- Terry Haig, Canadian actor, radio host, and journalist
- Terry Hale (born 1936), English former cricketer
- Terry Hale, American member of backup band Ace in the Hole Band
- Terry Hall, several people
- Terry Halpin (born 1950s), Australian computer scientist
- Terry Halvorsen, American retired military officer
- Terry Hammond (born 1957), Australian former racing cyclist
- Terry Hanck (born 1944), American electric blues saxophonist, singer, songwriter, and record producer
- Terry Handley (1952–2015), American astronomer
- Terry Hands (1941–2020), English theatre director
- Terry Hankins (1974–2009), American serial killer
- Terry Hanratty (born 1948), American former NFL player
- Terry Hanson (born 1947), American retired radio personality and sports coach
- Terry Hardy (born 1976), American former NFL player
- Terry Harkin (born 1941), Northern Irish former professional footballer
- Terry Harknett (1936–2019), British author
- Terry Harmon (born 1944), American former MLB player
- Terry "Harmonica" Bean (born 1961), American blues harmonicist, guitarist, and songwriter
- Terry Harper (born 1940), Canadian former NHL player
- Terry Harper (baseball) (born 1955), American retired MLB player
- Terry Harris (1923–1980), New Zealand water polo player
- Terry Harrison, several people
- Terry Hart, several people
- Terry Haskins (1955–2000), American politician
- Terry Hawkridge (born 1990), English professional footballer
- Terry Hawthorne (born 1990), American former football player and coach
- Terry Haydon, New Zealand former association footballer
- Terry Hayes (born 1951), Australian screenwriter, film producer, and author
- Terry Hayhurst (born 1985), Canadian former professional darts player
- Terry Healy (footballer) (1921–2009), Australian VFL player
- Terry Healy (politician) (born 1981), Australian politician
- Terry Heath (1943–2011), English footballer
- Terry Hecker (born 1970), Australian former VFL player
- Terry Hee (born 1995), Singaporean badminton player
- Terry Heffernan (1952–2010), New Zealand politician
- Terry Hemmings (born 1936), Australian former politician
- Terry Henderson (born 1994), American LBA- and NBL player
- Terry Henley, American former football player
- Terry Hennessey (born 1942), Welsh former international footballer
- Terry Henry, several people
- Terry Herbert, English man who discovered the Staffordshire Hoard
- Terry Hermansson (born 1967), New Zealand former professional rugby league footballer
- Terry Hermeling (born 1946), American former NFL player
- Terry Hershner, American electric vehicle- and renewable energy advocate
- Terry Hertzler (born 1949), American poet and writer
- Terry Hibbitt (1947–1994), English footballer
- Terry Hicks (born 1945), Australian activist
- Terry Higgins (1945–1982), Welsh man who died of AIDS
- Terry Hill (1972–2024), Australian professional rugby league footballer
- Terry Hilton, real name of Sam Plank (1948/1949–2011), English radio personality
- Terry Hirst (1932–2015), British-Kenyan cartoonist
- Terry Hoage (born 1962), American former NFL player
- Terry Hodgkinson (1949–2019), English businessman
- Terry Hoeppner (1947–2007), American college football coach
- Terry Hogan, several people
- Terry Holbrook (born 1945), English football referee
- Terry Holbrook (ice hockey) (born 1950), Canadian former NHL- and WHA player
- Terry Holdbrooks (born 1983), American former soldier and current speaker, writer, student, and volunteer
- Terry Holland (1942–2023), American college athletics administrator, and basketball player and coach
- Terry Hollands (born 1979), English bodybuilder
- Terry Holley, American businessman and political nominee
- Terry Hollindrake (1934–2015), English professional rugby league footballer
- Terry Hollinger (born 1971), Canadian retired NHL- and DEL player
- Terry Holmes (born 1957), Welsh former rugby union- and rugby league player
- Terry Horan (born c. 1966), American college football coach
- Terry Hornbuckle (born 1962), American pastor and convicted rapist
- Terry Horne (1953–2019), New Zealand cricketer
- Terry Howard (born 1966), English former footballer
- Terry Huang, American-Canadian-Taiwanese prevention scientist and professor
- Terry Hubbard (born 1950), Welsh former professional footballer
- Terry Huberts (born 1946), Dutch-born Canadian politician
- Terry Hudson, British Paralympic athlete
- Terry Hudson (rugby league), English former professional rugby league footballer
- Terry Hughes, several people
- Terry Humphrey (born 1949), American former MLB player
- Terry Hunte (born 1962), Barbadian former cricketer
- Terry Hunter, American house music DJ
- Terry Hurlock (born 1958), English former professional footballer
- Terry Hutchinson (born 1968), American sailor
- Terry Hyatt (born 1957), American serial killer
- Terry Hyman (1951–2008), American politician
- Terry Im, real name of KRNFX (born 1989), Korean-Canadian beatboxer and singer
- Terry Ingersoll (1934–2020), Australian VFL player
- Terry Ingmire (born 1956), American politician
- Terry Irvin (born 1954), Canadian former CFL player
- Terry Irving (born 1971), American former NFL player
- Terry Irving (producer), American producer, consultant, and author
- Terry Isaac (1958–2019), American painter
- Terry Ito (born 1949), Japanese director, television producer, critic, and writer
- Terry J. Albury, American former FBI agent convicted of violating the Espionage Act of 1917
- Terry J. Hatter Jr. (born 1933), American senior district judge
- Terry Jackman (born 1943), Australian retired businessman
- Terry Jacks (born 1944), Canadian singer, songwriter, guitarist, and record producer
- Terry Jackson, several people
- Terry Jarvis (born 1944), New Zealand businessman and former cricketer
- Terry Jaymes, American radio program host
- Terry Jeffrey, several people
- Terry Jenkins (born 1963), English former professional darts player
- Terry Jenner (1944–2011), Australian cricketer
- Terry Jennings (1940–1981), American minimalist composer and woodwind performer
- Terry Jenson, Canadian politician
- Terry Jermy (born 1985), English politician
- Terry Jervis (born 1962), British media producer, entrepreneur, and business executive
- Terry John Care (born 1947), American politician
- Terry Johnson, several people
- Terry Johnston, several people
- Terry Jolley (born 1959), English former professional footballer
- Terry Jones, several people
- Terry Jordan, several people
- Terry Jorgensen (born 1966), American former MLB player
- Terry Joseph (born 1973), American football coach and former professional baseball player
- Terry Joyce (1954–2011), American NFL player
- Terry K. Amthor (1958–2021), American game designer
- Terry Kath (1946–1978), American guitarist; past member of rock band Chicago (band)
- Terry Katsma (born 1958), American politician and businessman
- Terry Katzman (1955–2019), American producer, sound engineer, archivist, and record-store owner
- Terry Kavanagh, American comic book editor and writer
- Terry Kay (1938–2020), American author
- Terry Kearns (1945–2020), Irish Gaelic footballer
- Terry Keays (born 1970), Australian former VFL/AFL player
- Terry Kee Buck Hwa, Singaporean former Lutheran bishop
- Terry Kellar (1890–1950), American professional boxer
- Terry Kelly, several people
- Terry Kendall (1947–2002), New Zealand professional golfer
- Terry Kennedy, several people
- Terry Kent, several people
- Terry Kenyon, Western Australian former municipal politician
- Terry Kern (born 1954), American former ski jumper
- Terry Kershaw (1952–2015), American sociologist and professor of Africana studies
- Terry Kett, Canadian candidate in the 2006 Greater Sudbury municipal election
- Terry Kiely (born 1975), English actor
- Terry Kilburn (born 1926), English-American actor
- Terry Kilgore (born 1961), American attorney and politician
- Terry Killens (born 1974), American NFL official and former player
- Terry Kimball, American murder victim
- Terry Kinard (born 1959), American former NFL player
- Terry King, several people
- Terry Kingston (born 1963), Irish former international rugby union player
- Terry Kinney (born 1954), American actor and theater director
- Terry Kirby (born 1970), American former NFL player
- Terry Kirkbride, English drummer
- Terry Kirkland (born 1948), Canadian former provincial politician
- Terry Kirkman (1939–2023), American singer and songwriter; member of sunshine pop band The Association
- Terry Kiser (born 1939), American actor
- Terry Kitchen, American folk singer-songwriter
- Terry Klassen, Canadian voice actor, ADR director, and writer
- Terry Kleffman, American curler
- Terry Kleisinger (born 1960), Canadian retired NHL player
- Terry Kniess, American contestant on The Price Is Right
- Terry Knight (1943–2004), American rock and roll music producer, promoter, singer, songwriter, and radio personality
- Terry Kohler (1934–2016), American businessman, politician, sportsman, philanthropist, and conservationist
- Terry Kosens (1941–2004), American NFL player
- Terry Koumoudouros (19??–2007), Greek-Canadian strip club owner
- Terry Kraft (born 1961), American retired naval officer
- Terry Kroeger, American former publisher of Omaha World-Herald
- Terry Kubicka (born 1956), American retired figure skater
- Terry Kung, Hong Kong international lawn bowler
- Terry Kuntz (born 1953), American game designer
- Terry Kunz (born 1952), American former NFL player
- Terry Kunze (born 1943), American basketball player and coach
- Terry Kupers (born 1943), American psychiatrist and professor
- Terry Kurtenbach (born 1963), Canadian-born British former ice hockey player
- Terry L. Bellamy, American director of public works and transportation
- Terry L. Bullard, American Air Force brigadier general
- Terry L. Grove (1942–2020), American minister
- Terry L. Huitink (1951–2014), American jurist
- Terry L. McMillan, American former college football player and coach
- Terry L. Pechota (born 1947), American attorney
- Terry L. Punt (1949–2009), American politician
- Terry L. Witte (born 1952), American attorney and politician
- Terry L. Wooten (born 1954), American senior district judge
- Terry LaBan (born 1961), American alternative/underground cartoonist and newspaper comic strip artist
- Terry Labonte (born 1956), American retired NASCAR driver
- Terry Lake (born 1957), English-born Canadian former politician and veterinarian
- Terry Lakin, American army criminal
- Terry Lamb (born 1961), Australian former rugby league footballer and coach
- Terry Lamey (born 1977), Australian former professional rugby league footballer
- Terry Landry Jr., American politician from Louisiana
- Terry Landry Sr. (born 1951), American politician from Louisiana
- Terry Lane (born 1939), Australian retired radio broadcaster and newspaper columnist
- Terry Lane (musician), American R&B singer
- Terry Langford (1966–1998), American convicted murderer
- Terry Larkin (1856–1894), American MLB pitcher
- Terry Larrier (born 1995), American professional basketball player
- Terry Lartey Sanniez (born 1996), Dutch professional footballer
- Terry Laughlin (1951–2017), American swimming coach and author
- Terry Lawless (1933–2009), English boxing manager and trainer
- Terry Lawrence (1910–1989), English cricketer
- Terry Leabeater (born 1958), Australian former rugby league footballer
- Terry Leach (born 1954), American former MLB pitcher
- Terry Leahy (born 1956), English businessman
- Terry Leahy (footballer) (1946–2002), Australian VFL player
- Terry Leahy (hurler) (1917–1988), Irish sportsperson
- Terry LeCount (born 1956), American former NFL player
- Terry Ledgerton (1930–2004), English footballer
- Terry Lee, several people
- Terry Lees (born 1952), English former footballer
- Terry Le Main (born 1939), Jersey former politician
- Terry Lenzner (1939–2020), American attorney
- Terry Leonard (born 1940), American stunt performer and second-unit director
- Terry Lester (1950–2003), American actor
- Terry Le Sueur (born 1942), Jersey politician
- Terry Lewis, several people
- Terry Ley (born 1947), American former MLB pitcher
- Terry Leyden (born 1945), Irish former politician
- Terry Lightfoot (1935–2013), English jazz clarinettist and bandleader
- Terry Lilley, British member of pop band Terry and Gerry
- Terry Lim (born 1940), Malaysian-born Australian martial artist
- Terry Lin (born 1966), Taiwanese singer
- Terry Lineen (1936–2020), New Zealand rugby union player
- Terry Link (born 1947), American politician
- Terry Liskevych (born 1948), Ukrainian-American retired volleyball coach
- Terry Lloyd (1952–2003), English television journalist
- Terry Locke (born 1946), New Zealand poet, anthologist, poetry reviewer, and academic
- Terry Lockington (1913–2001), New Zealand international rugby union player
- Terry Loder (born 1953), Canadian politician
- Terry Lofton, American film director
- Terry Long, several people
- Terry Love (born 1963), Australian former VFL player
- Terry Lovejoy (born 1966), Australian information technologist
- Terry Lowe (born 1943), English former footballer
- Terry Lowry (born 1974), American composer, conductor, and pianist
- Terry Lubbock, English father of Stuart Lubbock
- Terry Luck (born 1952), American former NFL player
- Terry Lundgren (born 1952), American retired business executive
- Terry Lupton, American songwriter and producer
- Terry Luttrell (born 1947), American rock singer
- Terry Lyle Hanson, Canadian politician
- Terry Lyons, several people
- Terry M. Cross (born 1947), American retired Coast Guard Vice Admiral
- Terry M. Marshall, Canadian candidate in the Christian Heritage Party of Canada candidates in the 2004 Canadian federal election
- Terry M. Moe (born 1949), American professor emeritus of political science
- Terry MacAlmon (born 1955), American Christian singer, songwriter, musician, recording artist, worship leader, and author
- Terry MacBride (1927–2019), Australian international rugby union player
- Terry MacGill (born 1945), Western Australian former cricketer
- Terry Mackenroth (1949–2018), Australian politician
- Terry MacKin (1915–2008), Australian VFL player
- Terry Magaoa Chapman (1944/1945–2014), Niuean administrator
- Terry Magee (born 1964), Irish retired professional boxer
- Terry Magnuson, American developmental geneticist, academic administrator, and professor
- Terry Malkin (1935–2010), British speed skater
- Terry Malley (born 1954), American football coach
- Terry Malone, American football coach
- Terry Mancini (born 1942), English former professional footballer
- Terry Manners (born 1939), New Zealand former marathon runner
- Terry Manning, American photographer, composer, singer-songwriter, multi-instrumentalist, record producer, audio engineer, and visual artist
- Terry Maple (1946–2023), American ethologist, wildlife conservationist, professor of technology, and zoo director
- Terry Marcel (born 1942), English film director
- Terry Marchant (born 1976), American former IHL-, AHL-, ECHL- and CHL player
- Terry Marsh, several people
- Terry Martin, several people
- Terry Mason (born 1943), Australian Paralympic athlete and weightlifter
- Terry Matalas (born 1975), American television writer, director, and executive producer
- Terry Mathews (1964–2012), American MLB player
- Terry Matlock (born 1962), American politician
- Terry Matte (c. 1943–2009), Canadian news producer
- Terry Matterson (born 1967), Australian rugby league coach and former player
- Terry Matthews, several people
- Terry Mattingly (born 1954), American journalist, author, and professor
- Terry Mayne (1950–1983), Australian VFL player
- Terry Mazany, American philanthropist and administrator
- Terry McAskell (born 1944), Australian field hockey player
- Terry McAulay (born 1959), American former NFL official
- Terry McAuliffe (born 1957), American businessman and politician
- Terry McBrayer (1937–2020), American lobbyist, attorney, and politician
- Terry McBride, several people
- Terry McCabe (1946–2013), American golf club designer and innovator
- Terry McCarthy, several people
- Terry McCashin (1944–2017), New Zealand businessman, brewer, farmer, and international rugby union player
- Terry McCavana (1922–2015), Northern Irish footballer
- Terry McCombs (1905–1982), New Zealand politician
- Terry McCreary (born 1952), American retired Navy admiral
- Terry McCutcheon, Canadian candidate in the Progressive Conservative Party of Ontario candidates in the 2003 Ontario provincial election
- Terry McDaniel (born 1965), American former NFL player
- Terry McDaniel (baseball) (born 1966), American former MLB player
- Terry McDavitt (born 1948), New Zealand educator, politician, and activist
- Terry McDermott, several people
- Terry McDonald, several people
- Terry McDonell (born 1944), American editor, writer, and publishing executive
- Terry McDonough, British television director
- Terry McEniff, Irish hotelier and businessman; former politician and mayor
- Terry McFlynn (born 1981), Northern Irish retired footballer
- Terry McGee (born 1936), New Zealand-born Canadian urban geographer and social scientist
- Terry McGee (footballer) (1945–2020), Australian VFL player
- Terry McGovern, several people
- Terry McGriff (born 1963), American former MLB player
- Terry McGroom (1966–2016), American professional boxer
- Terry McGuire, American venture capitalist
- Terry McGuirk, American MLB executive
- Terry McGurrin, Canadian comedian, writer, producer, and voice actor
- Terry McHugh (born 1963), Irish retired track and field athlete
- Terry McKenna (born 1964), New Zealand cricketer
- Terry McLaughlin (born 1956), Canadian sailor
- Terry McLaurin (born 1995), American NFL player
- Terry McLean (1913–2004), New Zealand sports journalist and author
- Terry McMahon, Irish director, producer, writer, actor, and acting coach
- Terry McManus (1946–2021), Canadian singer-songwriter
- Terry McMillan (musician) (1953–2007), American country music singer, harmonica player, and percussionist
- Terry McMillan (politician), American politician and surgeon
- Terry McNee (1925–1999), English professional footballer
- Terry McPhillips (born 1968), English professional football manager and former player
- Terry McQuade (born 1941), English footballer
- Terry McRae (1941–2006), Australian politician and lawyer
- Terry Meagher, Canadian retired ice hockey player and coach
- Terry Medwin (1932–2024), Welsh footballer
- Terry Meek (born 1962), Canadian curler
- Terry Meiners (born 1957), American radio and television personality
- Terry Melcher (1942–2004), American record producer, singer, and songwriter
- Terry Melling (1940–2021), English footballer
- Terry Melvin Sims (1942–2000), American convicted murderer
- Terry Mendenhall (born 1949), American former NFL player
- Terry Mercer (born 1947), Canadian former politician
- Terry Metcalf (born 1951), American former NFL player
- Terry Metherell (born 1947), Australian former politician
- Terry Michael Duncan (1967–1993), American man whom pro-Yeltsin troops killed during the 1993 Russian constitutional crisis
- Terry Michos (born 1953), American retired actor and news anchor
- Terry Mickens (born 1971), American former NFL player
- Terry Milera (born 1988), Australian former AFL player
- Terry Miles (born 1937), English former professional footballer
- Terry Milewski (born 1949/1950), Canadian journalist
- Terry Millar (1948–2019), American professor emeritus of mathematics and associate dean for physical sciences
- Terry Miller, several people
- Terry Milligan (1930–2003), Northern Irish boxer
- Terry Mills, several people
- Terry Mitchell (born 1950), New Zealand former rugby union player
- Terry Mohajir, American college football coach and former player
- Terry Molloy (born 1947), English actor
- Terry Moloney, several people
- Terry Monaghan (born 1933), British speed skater
- Terry Moor (born 1952), American former tennis player and current database programmer
- Terry Moore, several people
- Terry Moores (1949–2014), English ceramic artist
- Terry Moran (disambiguation), several people
- Terry Morgan (born 1948), British engineer
- Terry Moriarty (1925–2011), Western Australian WANFL player
- Terry Morrall (born 1938), English former footballer
- Terry Morris, several people
- Terry Morrison, several people
- Terry Morrissey (1944–2020), Australian VFL player
- Terry Morrow (born 1963), American politician
- Terry Morse (biathlete) (born 1946), American biathlete
- Terry Mosher (born 1942), Canadian political cartoonist
- Terry Moulton (born 1946), American former politician
- Terry Mountain (born 1935), Australian former VFL player
- Terry Mulder (born 1952), Australian former politician
- Terry Mulholland (born 1963), American former MLB pitcher
- Terry Mullen (born 1956), Scottish footballer
- Terry Mulvoy (1938–2020), English footballer
- Terry Murphy, several people
- Terry Murray (born 1950), Canadian former NHL player and coach
- Terry Murray (Irish footballer) (1928–2017), Irish international footballer
- Terry Murrell (born 1968), American academic administrator
- Terry Musser (1947–2018), American politician and military personnel
- Terry Myerson (born 1972/1973), American operating executive
- Terry Mynott (born 1974), English comedian, actor, impressionist, and singer
- Terry N. Trieweiler (born 1948), American former Supreme Court justice
- Terry Nantier, American founder of graphic novel publisher NBM Publishing
- Terry Nardin (born 1942), Singaporean political scientist
- Terry Nation (1930–1997), Welsh screenwriter and novelist
- Terry Naylor (born 1948), English former professional footballer
- Terry Nealey (born 1947), American politician
- Terry Neill, several people
- Terry Nelhams, alternate name of Adam Faith (1940–2003), English singer, actor, and financial journalist
- Terry Nelson, several people
- Terry Newman (born 1981), British-Israeli businessman and activist
- Terry Newton (1978–2010), English professional rugby league footballer
- Terry Nicholl (born 1952), English former association footballer and manager
- Terry Nichols (born 1955), American domestic terrorist convicted in the Oklahoma City bombing
- Terry Nofsinger (1938–2007), American NFL player
- Terry Norman (born 1949), American FBI informant
- Terry Norris, several people
- Terry Notary (born 1968), American actor, stunt co-ordinator/double, and movement coach
- Terry Nugent (1920–2006), Canadian barrister, lawyer, and World War II-era soldier
- Terry Nugent (American football) (born 1961), American former NFL player
- Terry Nutkins (1946–2012), English naturalist
- Terry Nylander (born 1946), Canadian former politician and farmer
- Terry O. Morse (1906–1984), American film director and editor
- Terry Obee (born 1968), American former NFL player
- Terry O'Brien, several people
- Terry O'Connor, several people
- Terry O'Dea (1945–2021), Australian professional darts player
- Terry Odishaw (born 1966), Canadian curler
- Terry O'Donnell, several people
- Terry Ogden (1911–1935), Australian VFL player
- Terry O'Gorman, Australian lawyer and civil rights activist
- Terry O'Grady (1934–1987), English professional rugby league footballer
- Terry O'Hanlon, Australian former rowing coxswain
- Terry Oldfield (born 1949), English composer; brother of Sally and Mike Oldfield
- Terry Oldfield (footballer) (born 1939), English former professional footballer
- Terry Oliver (born 1963), Australian cricket coach
- Terry Ollis, English past member of rock band Hawkwind
- Terry O'Malley (born 1940), Canadian retired ice hockey player
- Terry O'Mara (1941–1998), Australian VFL player
- Terry O'Neill, several people
- Terry O'Quinn (born 1952), American actor
- Terry O'Reilly (born 1951), Canadian former NHL player
- Terry O'Reilly (broadcaster) (born 1959), Canadian broadcast producer and personality
- Terry Ork (?–2004), American band manager and record producer
- Terry Orndorff (born 1951), American retired professional wrestler
- Terry Orr (born 1961), American former NFL player
- Terry O'Shea (born 1966), American former NFL- and WLAF player
- Terry O'Sullivan (1915–2006), American actor
- Terry O'Sullivan (1936–1997), New Zealand rugby union player
- Terry Owen (born 1949), English former footballer
- Terry Owens, several people
- Terry Paice (born 1953), Canadian wrestler
- Terry Paine (born 1939), English former professional footballer
- Terry Palmer, several people
- Terry Pannowitz (born 1942), Australian former rugby league player
- Terry Park (born 1957), English footballer
- Terry Parker (born 1949), Australian former rugby league footballer
- Terry Parmenter (born 1947), English former professional footballer
- Terry Parry (1921–1982), British firefighter and trade unionist
- Terry Parsons (1935–1999), Welsh snooker player
- Terry Pashley (born 1956), English former professional footballer
- Terry Patchett (1940–1996), British politician
- Terry Pathmanathan (born 1956), Singaporean former international footballer
- Terry Peach (1950–2022), American farmer and politician
- Terry Peake (born 1980), American composer, record producer, multi-instrumentalist, and company owner
- Terry Pearce, several people
- Terry Pearson, several people
- Terry Peck (1938–2006), British member of the FIDF
- Terry Peder Rasmussen (1943–2010), American convicted murderer and suspected serial killer
- Terry Pegula (born 1951), American billionaire businessman and petroleum engineer
- Terry Peirce (1930–1984), Australian VFL player
- Terry Pendleton (born 1960), American former MLB player
- Terry Perdue (1940–1998), Welsh weightlifter
- Terry Perkins, several people
- Terry Petris (1961–2010), American racing driver
- Terry Pettit (born 1946), American retired volleyball coach
- Terry Pettus (1904–1984), American newspaper reporter and activist
- Terry Phelan (born 1967), English football coach and former professional player
- Terry Philippe (born 1957), Australian former VFL player
- Terry Phillips, American journalist, author, and media consultant
- Terry Pierce (born 1981), American former NFL player
- Terry Pilkadaris (born 1973), Australian professional golfer
- Terry Pindell, American travel writer, and former teacher and mayoral candidate
- Terry Pinkard (born 1947), American philosopher and professor
- Terry Pitt (1937–1986), British political researcher and adviser
- Terry Plumeri (1944–2016), American musician, classical composer, orchestra conductor, double bassist, lecturer, teacher, producer, and film score composer
- Terry Pluto (born 1955), American sportswriter, newspaper columnist, and author
- Terry Poole, several people
- Terry Porter, several people
- Terry Pratchett (1948–2015), English author, humorist, and satirist
- Terry Preston, stage name of Ferlin Husky (1925–2011), American country music singer
- Terry Price, several people
- Terry Prindiville (born 1942), Australian former cricketer
- Terry Prue (born 1948), Western Australian retired Test cricket umpire
- Terry Puhl (born 1956), Canadian former MLB player and coach
- Terry Pyles, American sculptor
- Terry R. Ferrell (born 1962), American retired Army lieutenant general
- Terry R. Gilleland Jr. (born 1977), American politician
- Terry R. LaValley (born 1956), American Roman Catholic prelate
- Terry R. McGuire, American professor of genetics
- Terry R. Means (born 1948), American senior district judge
- Terry R. Parke (born 1944), American military personnel
- Terry R. Payne, British computer scientist and artificial intelligence researcher
- Terry R. Spence (born 1941), American politician
- Terry Racionzer (born 1943), Scottish businessman and former cricketer
- Terry Ramsaye (1885–1954), American journalist, film producer, and film historian
- Terry Ramsden (born 1952), English investor and gambler
- Terry Ramshaw (c. 1943–2017), English professional rugby league footballer
- Terry Rance, English past member of heavy metal band Iron Maiden
- Terry Rand (1934–2014), American basketball player
- Terry Randall (born 1951), Australian former rugby league footballer
- Terry Randolph (born 1955), American former NFL player
- Terry Ratcliffe (1930–1999), English boxer
- Terry Ratzmann (?–2005), American perpetrator of the 2005 Living Church of God shooting
- Terry Rawlings (1933–2019), English film- and sound editor
- Terry Ray, several people
- Terry Reardon (1919–1993), Canadian NHL player and coach
- Terry Redlin (1937–2016), American illustrator
- Terry Redman (born 1963), Australian politician
- Terry Ree (?–2024), American comedian
- Terry Reese (born 1967), American former track and field hurdler
- Terry Regan, several people
- Terry Reid (born 1949), English rock vocalist, songwriter, and guitarist
- Terry Reid (1934–2017), Australian international rugby union player
- Terry Reilly (born 1947), Australian archer
- Terry Rennaker (born 1958), American former NFL player
- Terry Reynolds (1948–2007), Australian professional rugby league footballer
- Terry Rhoads (1951–2013), American television actor
- Terry Rice (born 1954), American politician and furniture- and appliance store owner
- Terry Richards (1932–2014), British actor and stuntman
- Terry Richardson (born 1965), American fashion- and portrait photographer
- Terry Richardson (ice hockey) (born 1953), Canadian former NHL player
- Terry Richardson (rugby league), English former professional rugby league footballer
- Terry Riley (born 1935), American composer and musician
- Terry Riley (broadcaster) (1944–2019), English deaf rights activist and broadcaster
- Terry Riordan (born 1973), American former MLL player
- Terry Robards (1939–2024), American wine critic
- Terry Robb (born 1956), Canadian fingerstyle guitarist, composer, arranger, and record producer
- Terry Robbins (1947–1970), American student activist
- Terry Robbins (footballer) (born 1965), English former professional footballer
- Terry Roberts, several people
- Terry Robinson, several people
- Terry Robiskie (born 1954), American former NFL coach and player
- Terry Rocavert (born 1955), Australian former professional tennis player
- Terry Rodgers (born 1947), American artist
- Terry Rodgers (footballer) (1943–2023), Australian VFL player
- Terry Rogers (Australian politician) (born 1958), Australian former politician
- Terry Rogers (Georgia politician), American politician
- Terry Rollock (born 1969), Barbadian former cricketer
- Terry Ronald, English author, songwriter, music producer, and singer
- Terry Rooney, several people
- Terry Rosen (1939–1999), American jazz guitarist, concert promoter, and radio DJ
- Terry Rosenberg (born 1954), American artist
- Terry Rossio (born 1960), American screenwriter and film producer
- Terry Rossiter (born 1944), Zimbabwean diver
- Terry Rossland (1952–1990), American man who committed suicide
- Terry Rowe (born 1964), English retired NASL- and CISL player
- Terry Roy (born 1968), American politician
- Terry Rozier (born 1994), American NBA player
- Terry Ruane (1946–2024), English actor and theatre director
- Terry Rudolph (born 1973), British professor of quantum physics
- Terry Rumbel (born 1951), Australian former sports shooter
- Terry Rumble (born 1942), Australian former politician
- Terry Rupp (born 1966), American former baseball coach
- Terry Ruskowski (born 1954), Canadian former NHL- and WHA player and coach
- Terry Rusling (1931–1974), Canadian electronic music composer
- Terry Ryan, several people
- Terry Rymer (born 1967), English former professional motorcycle road racer turned car- and truck driver
- Terry Sabo (born 1966), American former politician
- Terry Sackor (born 1993), Liberian footballer
- Terry Saldaña (1958–2023), Filipino PBA player
- Terry Sale (born 1951), New Zealand gymnast
- Terry Samuels (born 1970), American former NFL- and AFL player
- Terry Sanchez Wallace, birth name of Tee Grizzley (born 1994), American rapper
- Terry Sanders (born 1931), American filmmaker
- Terry Sanderson, several people
- Terry Sanford (1917–1998), American lawyer and politician
- Terry Sargeant (born 1946), Canadian former politician and administrator
- Terry Saul (1921–1976), Choctaw/Chickasaw illustrator, painter, muralist, commercial artist, and educator
- Terry Savarise, American MLB executive
- Terry Sawchuk (1929–1970), Canadian NHL player
- Terry Scales, several people
- Terry Scanlon, several people
- Terry Schalk, American physicist and professor emeritus
- Terry Schappert, American Army veteran and martial artist
- Terry Scheetz (born 1941), American former politician
- Terry Schmidt (born 1952), American dentist and former NFL player
- Terry Schofield (born 1948), American former basketball player and coach
- Terry Schoonhoven (1945–2001), American muralist, lithographer, and painter
- Terry Schoonover (1951–1984), American stock car racing driver
- Terry Schreiber (born 1937), American theater director, acting teacher, and studio founder
- Terry Schroeder (born 1958), American former water polo player
- Terry Schrunk (1913–1975), American politician
- Terry Scott, several people
- Terry Scully (1932–2001), British theatre and television actor
- Terry Scurfield, Australian former professional rugby league footballer
- Terry Segarty (born 1946), Irish-born Canadian mechanic, businessman, and former political figure
- Terry Sejnowski (born 1947), American neuroscientist, professor, and computer scientist
- Terry Selders, American former manager of roots rock band The Badlees
- Terry Semel (born 1943), American businessman
- Terry Serepisos (born 1963), Greek-born New Zealand businessman
- Terry Serio, Australian actor, director, musician, and singer-songwriter
- Terry Serpico, American film- and television actor
- Terry Setch (born 1936), British painter
- Terry Shanahan (born 1951), English former professional footballer
- Terry Shand (1904–1977), American pianist, vocalist, bandleader, and songwriter
- Terry Shand (record producer), English founder of Eagle Rock Entertainment
- Terry Shannon, several people
- Terry Shaw, several people
- Terry Shea (born 1946), American football coach and former player
- Terry Sheahan (born 1947), Australian judge and former politician
- Terry Sheehan (born 1970), Canadian politician
- Terry Shell (1922–1978), American district judge
- Terry Shelton, American politician
- Terry Shepherd (?–2012), British Grand Prix motorcycle road racer
- Terry Shercliffe, American retired ice hockey player and head coach
- Terry Shintani (born 1951), American physician, nutritionist, and author
- Terry Shumpert (born 1966), American former MLB player
- Terry Silverlight, American jazz-, pop-, rock-, and R&B drummer, composer, producer, arranger, and author
- Terry Sims (born c. 1971), American college football coach
- Terry Simpson (born 1943), Canadian former EHL player and former NHL head coach
- Terry Simpson (footballer) (born 1938), English retired professional footballer
- Terry Skiverton (born 1975), English former footballer
- Terry Skrypek (born 1948), American retired ice hockey player and coach
- Terry Slater, several people
- Terry Slesser, English blues rock singer
- Terry Small (1927–1983), British international motorcycle speedway rider
- Terry Smiljanich (born 1947), American retired lawyer
- Terry Smith, several people
- Terry Snoddy (1899–?), American college football player
- Terry Snow (1943–2024), Australian businessman, accountant, entrepreneur, and philanthropist
- Terry Southern (1924–1995), American novelist, essayist, screenwriter, and university lecturer
- Terry Spahr (born 1966), American businessman, filmmaker, environmental activist, and politician
- Terry Speed (born 1943), Australian statistician
- Terry Spencer (1931–2020), English cricketer
- Terry Spencer (RAF officer) (1918–2009), English Army- and Air Force personnel and photojournalist
- Terry Spicer (born 1965), American politician
- Terry Spinks (1938–2012), English boxer
- Terry Springthorpe (1923–2006), English professional footballer
- Terry Stacey (born 1962), English cinematographer
- Terry Stacey (footballer) (born 1936), English former professional footballer
- Terry Stafford (1941–1996), American singer and songwriter
- Terry Stanley (born 1951), English former professional footballer
- Terry Stannard (1949–2019), English drummer
- Terry Stapleton (1933–1991), Australian writer, playwright, and actor
- Terry Starr, Canadian Tsimshian Nation artist
- Terry Statham (born 1940), English former professional footballer
- Terry St Clair, English folk musician, guitarist, and composer
- Terry St. Louis (born 1969), Trinidadian former footballer
- Terry Steinbach (born 1962), American former MLB player and coach
- Terry Steiner (born 1970), American wrestler and wrestling coach
- Terry Stembridge, American former NBA-, NFL-, and MLB broadcaster
- Terry Stephens (born 1959), South Australian politician
- Terry Stephens (footballer) (born 1935), Welsh former footballer
- Terry Stepien (born 1955), Canadian computer scientist
- Terry Stickels (born 1948), American author and puzzle designer
- Terry Stieve (born 1954), American former NFL player
- Terry Stoddart (1931–2014), English footballer
- Terry Stoepel (1945–2016), American NFL player
- Terry Stone (born 1971), English actor, film producer, and author
- Terry Stotts (born 1957), American former CBA player and current NBA coach
- Terry Stratton (born 1938), Canadian former politician
- Terry Stretton (1953–2018), English cricketer
- Terry Stringer (born 1946), English-born New Zealand sculptor
- Terry Stroud, American cast member on game show Master Blasters
- Terry Sturm (1941–2009), New Zealand editor and professor of English literature
- Terry Sweeney (born 1950), American actor, writer, and comedian
- Terry Sweeney (hang glider) (born 1947), American inventor and hang glider pioneer
- Terry Sue-Patt (1964–2015), English actor and artist
- Terry Sullivan, several people
- Terry Sumsion (1947–2011), Canadian country singer
- Terry Swanson (born 1944), American former NFL player
- Terry Swartzberg (born 1953), American public affairs campaigner and journalist
- Terry Swinscoe (born 1934), English former professional footballer
- Terry Sykes (born 1956), American former PBA player
- Terry Sylvester (born 1947), English musician and songwriter; past member of The Escorts (British band), the Swinging Blue Jeans, and the Hollies
- Terry Tamminen (born 1952), American author, lecturer, and strategist on energy and the environment
- Terry Tarpey (born 1994), French-American professional basketball player
- Terry Tata (born 1940), American former MLB umpire
- Terry Tate (Australian footballer) (born 1943), Australian former VFL player
- Terry Tate (singer), American singer
- Terry Tausch (1959–2020), American NFL player
- Terry Tautolo (born 1954), American former NFL player
- Terry Taylor, several people
- Terry Teachout (1956–2022), American author, critic, biographer, playwright, stage director, and librettist
- Terry Teagle (born 1960), American NBA- and CBA player
- Terry Teene (1942–2012), American musician, vocalist, songwriter, and entertainer
- Terry Temple (born 1961), English professional darts player
- Terry Tenette (born 1968), American professional cyclist
- Terry Teruo Kawamura (1949–1969), American Army soldier
- Terry Thomas, several people
- Terry Thompson, several people
- Terry Thripp (born 1963), Australian former VFL/AFL player
- Terry Tiffee (born 1979), American former MLB player
- Terry Tobacco (born 1936), Canadian former Olympic athlete
- Terry Todd (1938–2018), American powerlifter, and Olympic weightlifter
- Terry Toh (born 1974), Singapore chess International Master
- Terry Tolkin (1959–2022), American music executive and music journalist
- Terry Tornek (born 1945), American politician
- Terry Tranter, American former politician
- Terry Tremaine (born 1948), Canadian politician and white nationalist
- Terry Trotter (born 1940), American jazz pianist and piano teacher
- Terry Troxell (c. 1948–2009), American hydroplane driver
- Terry Truax (1945–2015), American college basketball player and coach
- Terry Trueman (born 1947), American author of young adult fiction
- Terry Tufts (born 1954), Canadian singer-songwriter
- Terry Tumey, American former football player and coach
- Terry Turner, several people
- Terry Turtle, a ring name of Gillberg (wrestler) (born 1959), American retired professional wrestler
- Terry Twell (1947–2013), English professional footballer
- Terry Twigger (born 1949), British businessman and accountant
- Terry Tyler (born 1956), American former LBA- and NBA player
- Terry Unrein (born 1962), American former NFL player
- Terry Urban (born 1977), American artist, DJ, and producer
- Terry Uttley (1951–2021), English bassist
- Terry Uyarak, Canadian Inuk singer-songwriter
- Terry Van Akkeren (born 1954), American engineering technician, die and tool maker, and politician
- Terry Van Horne (1946–2012), American politician
- Terry Vance (born 1953), American former professional motorcycle drag racer, racing team owner, and manufacturer of motorcycle parts
- Terry Vaughan (born 1938), Welsh former professional footballer
- Terry Vaughn (born 1971), Canadian former CFL player
- Terry Vaughn (referee) (1973–2023), American soccer referee
- Terry Venables (1943–2023), English footballer and manager
- Terry Vermeire, American politician
- Terry Virgo (born 1940), English leader in the British New Church Movement
- Terry Virtue (born 1970), Canadian former NHL player
- Terry W. Virts (born 1967), American retired NASA astronaut
- Terry W. Ward (1885–1929), American attorney
- Terry Wade (born 1960), American bodysurfer
- Terry Waite (born 1939), English human rights activist, author, and hostage negotiator
- Terry Waites (born 1933), Australian VFL player
- Terry Waldo (born 1944), American pianist, composer, and historian of early jazz, blues, and stride music
- Terry Waldron (born 1951), Western Australian politician
- Terry Walker, several people
- Terry Wall (born 1936), British mathematician and emeritus professor
- Terry Wallace (born 1958), Australian former VFL/AFL player and coach
- Terry Wallace (geophysicist) (born 1956), American geophysicist
- Terry Wallis (1964–2022), American survivor of a 19-year coma after an accident
- Terry Walsh, several people
- Terry Wanzek (born 1957), American politician
- Terry Wapi (born 1996), Papua New Guinean international rugby league footballer
- Terry Wapram, English past member of heavy metal band Iron Maiden
- Terry Ward (1939–1963), English footballer
- Terry Wardle (born 1944), British writer; former soldier, teacher, journalist, and businessman
- Terry Watada (born 1951), Canadian writer
- Terry Waters (1943–2020), Australian VFL player
- Terry Waters (British Army officer) (1929–1951), British soldier
- Terry Watt (born 1946), Irish judoka
- Terry Webster (1930–2016), English professional footballer
- Terry Weeks (born 1963), American R&B- and soul singer; member of vocal group The Temptations
- Terry Welch (1939–1988), American computer scientist
- Terry Wellesley (born 1948), Canadian retired footballer
- Terry Wells (born 1963), American former MLB pitcher
- Terry Wells (American football) (born 1951), American former NFL player
- Terry Wentz (1947–2010), American state park manager
- Terry Westbrook (born 1939), South African professional golfer
- Terry Westley (born 1959), English association football coach and manager
- Terry Wey (born 1985), Swiss-born American classical countertenor
- Terry Wharton (born 1942), English former professional footballer
- Terry Wheatley (born 1960), Canadian former field hockey player
- Terry Wheeler (born 1955), Australian former AFL player
- Terry White (born 1936), Australian pharmacist, businessman, and former politician
- Terry White (academic) (born 1943), Canadian academic
- Terry White (sprint canoeist) (born 1955), American sprint canoer
- Terry Whitehead (born 1957), British sprinter
- Terry Whitfield (born 1953), American former MLB player
- Terry Whitmore (1947–2007), American soldier, deserter, and actor
- Terry Whitthread (born 1964), English former professional snooker player
- Terry Wickey (born 1954), Australian former rugby league footballer
- Terry Wight (born 1956), Australian former VFL player
- Terry Wilcox (born c. 1940), American professional golfer
- Terry Wilder, American professor of New Testament and Greek
- Terry Wiles (born 1962), English-born New Zealand disabled writer
- Terry Wilkins, Australian-born Canadian musician, composer, and producer
- Terry Wilkins (footballer) (born 1953), Australian former VFL player
- Terry Willers (1935–2011), Irish cartoonist and comics artist
- Terry Willesee (born 1945), Australian retired journalist and television- and radio presenter
- Terry Williams, several people
- Terry Wilshusen (1949–2000), American MLB pitcher
- Terry Wilson, several people
- Terry Windell (1956–2018), American film- and television director
- Terry Winograd (born 1946), American computer scientist
- Terry Winsor, British film director
- Terry Winter, several people
- Terry Winters (born 1949), American painter, draughtsman, and printmaker
- Terry Wire (1941–2014), British philanthropist
- Terry Witherspoon (born 1977), American former NFL player
- Terry Wogan (1938–2016), Irish-British radio- and television broadcaster and writer
- Terry Wollman (born 1956), American jazz/pop musician, music director, guitarist, producer, and composer
- Terry Wong, Canadian former helicopter pilot
- Terry Woodberry (born 1963), English-American former indoor soccer player
- Terry Wooden (born 1967), American former NFL player
- Terry Woodgate (1919–1985), English footballer
- Terry Woods (born 1947), Irish folk musician, songwriter/singer, and multi-instrumentalist
- Terry Wright, several people
- Terry Wyatt (born 1957), British professor of physics and astronomy
- Terry Wynn (born 1946), English former politician and sailor
- Terry Xu, Taiwanese editor of blogging platform The Online Citizen
- Terry Yake (born 1968), Canadian former WHA-, NHL-, and DEL player
- Terry Yates (1950–2007), American biologist and academic
- Terry Yegbe (born 2001), Ghanaian professional footballer
- Terry Yorath (1950–2026), Welsh football player and manager
- Terry Young, several people
- Terry Yung, Canadian politician
- Terry Yurkiewicz (1943–2002), Canadian ice hockey player
- Terry Zahn (1946–2000), American television reporter and anchorman
- Terry Zwigoff (born 1949), American film director

== Female ==
- Terry a. O'Neal (born 1973), American writer
- Terry Alderete (1945–2013), American businesswoman
- Terry Babcock-Lumish (born 1976), American professor, entrepreneur, and policymaker
- Terry Barton, American perpetrator of the Hayman Fire
- Terry Baum (born 1946), American feminist playwright
- Terry Bellamy, American former mayor
- Terry Benzel (born 1956), American computer scientist
- Terry Bergeson (born 1942), American educator
- Terry Berkowitz, American video artist
- Terry Berlier (born 1972), American artist and sculptor
- Terry Beyer (born 1951), American politician
- Terry Braunstein (artist) (born 1942), American photomontage artist
- Terry Burnham (1949–2013), American actress
- Terry Carlisle (born 1954), American sports shooter
- Terry Castle (born 1953), American literary scholar
- Terry Cavaretta (born 1953), American aerialist
- Terry Crawford, several people
- Terry Cummings (politician), American politician
- Terry Dale, Canadian singer; host of music variety TV series Terry and Me
- Terry Devon (1922–2013), English jazz singer
- Terry Dexter (born 1978), American contemporary R&B singer and actress
- Terry Dintenfass (1920–2004), American art dealer
- Terry Donahue (baseball) (1925–2019), Canadian utility player in women's baseball
- Terry Ehret (born 1955), American poet
- Terry Ellis (born 1963), American singer
- Terry Engesha (born 1998), Kenyan professional footballer
- Terry Finn (born 1955), American actress
- Terry Fulmer, American gerontologist, professor, and dean
- Terry Gaasterland (born 1963), American politician, scientist, and professor of biology
- Terry Gabreski (born 1952), American retired USAF senior officer
- Terry Garrity (born 1934), American author
- Terry Gerratana (born 1949), American politician
- Terry Gillen, American candidate in the 2015 Philadelphia mayoral election
- Terry Goulet (born 1934), Canadian historian and author
- Terry Gregory (born 1956), American country music singer-songwriter
- Terry Griggs, Canadian author
- Terry Gross (born 1951), American journalist, talk radio host, and broadcast news analyst
- Terry Haass (1923–2016), Czechoslovak-born French artist
- Terry Hayes (politician) (born 1958), American politician
- Terry Hershey (1923–2017), American conservationist and environmentalist
- Terry Holladay (born 1955), American former professional tennis player
- Terry Hu (born 1953), Taiwanese actress, writer, and translator
- Terry Huntingdon (born 1940), American television- and film actress and beauty pageant titleholder
- Terry Irwin, American graphic designer, academic, and professor
- Terry Jernigan (born 1951/1952), American neuropsychologist
- Terry Jo Duperrault, formerly missing person who disappeared at sea
- Terry-Jo Myers (born 1962), American LPGA player
- Terry Karl (born 1947), American professor of Latin American studies and political science
- Terry Keane (1939–2008), Irish social columnist and fashion journalist
- Terry Keenan (1961–2014), American economic/business columnist
- Terry Keith, American geologist
- Terry Kovel (born 1928), American author
- Terry Kucera, American astrophysicist
- Terry Lathan, American political activist, strategist, and former teacher
- Terry Leibel, Canadian retired journalist and former equestrian
- Terry London Rinehart, American airline pilot
- Terry-Lynn Paynter (born 1969), Bermudian former javelin thrower and cricketer
- Terry MacTavish (born 1950), New Zealand actress and teacher
- Terry Marks, American Stuckist artist
- Terry Markwell (born 1953), American former actress
- Terry McCahill (born 1970), New Zealand former association footballer
- Terry McGregor (born 1977), Australian former cricketer
- Terry McMillan (born 1951), American novelist
- Terry Meeuwsen (born 1949), American television personality, author, and singer
- Terry Meza (born 1949), American politician and attorney
- Terry Milligan, American murder victim
- Terry Mulligan, American novelist
- Terry Mutchler, American attorney and writer
- Terry Neese (born 1947), American businesswoman and politician
- Terry Nihen, Playboy Playmate of the Month in December 1983
- Terry O'Flaherty, Irish mayor; daughter of politician Bridie O'Flaherty
- Terry O'Malley Seidler (born 1933), American former MLB owner and executive
- Terry Oroszi (born 1966), American author and professor
- Terry Orr-Weaver, American molecular biologist
- Terry Phelps (born 1966), American former professional tennis player
- Terry Pheto (born 1981), South African actress
- Terry Place-Brandel (born 1957), German volleyball player
- Terry Plank (born 1963), American geochemist, volcanologist, and professor of earth science
- Terry Poindexter, American taekwondo practitioner
- Terry Pollard (1931–2009), American jazz pianist and vibraphonist
- Terry Radigan, American country music singer
- Terry Rakolta (born 1944), American former anti-obscenity activist
- Terry Ramadhani Kiunge, Kenyan businesswoman, human resource professional, and corporate executive
- Terry Reintke (born 1987), German politician
- Terry Ross, American film director
- Terry Rukavina (1931–2010), American AAGPBL player
- Terry Saunders (?–2012), American actress and singer
- Terry Sendgraff (1933–2019), American modern dancer and choreographer
- Terry Shahab (born 1984), Indonesian singer
- Terry Sibbing (born 1963), Dutch former field hockey player
- Terry Sims (?–1984), American murder victim
- Terry Spear, American author
- Terry Timmons (1927–1970), American R&B singer
- Terry Tucker, American-English past member of psychedelic folk music trio Sunforest (band)
- Terry Tweed (born 1943), Canadian actress, playwright, and theatre director
- Terry Underwood (born 1944), Australian author
- Terry Van Duyn (born 1951), American former politician
- Terry Van Ginderen (1931–2018), Belgian Flemish-speaking television presenter and businesswoman
- Terry Wahls (born 1955), American physician and paleo diet advocate
- Terry Waxman (born 1956), American politician
- Terry Wolf, American politician
- Terry Wolverton (born 1954), American novelist, memoirist, poet, and editor
- Terry Yoshinaga, American politician and lawyer

== Fictional characters ==
- "Terrible" Terry Tate, in the 2000/2003 US TV commercial series Terry Tate: Office Linebacker, played by Lester Speight
- Terry, in the 1930 US film serial Terry of the Times, played by Reed Howes
- Terry, in the 1985 UK children's drama film Terry on the Fence, played by Jack McNicholl
- Terry, in the 1989 video game Terry's Big Adventure
- Terry Bates, several characters
- Terry Beaumont, in the US supernatural teen drama mystery-thriller TV series Ravenswood, played by Sophina Brown
- Terry Bellefleur, in the US TV drama series True Blood, played by Todd Lowe
- Terry Berg, in the Green Lantern comic book series published by DC Comics
- Terry Bogard, in the Fatal Fury and The King of Fighters fighting video games, voiced by Satoshi Hashimoto, Takashi Kondō, and Mark Hildreth (actor)
- Terry Boot, in the Harry Potter novel series, by J. K. Rowling
- Terry Brock, in the US TV soap opera General Hospital, played by Robyn Bernard
- Terry Cant, in the UK TV soap opera EastEnders, played by Brian Conley
- Terry Carnation, in the horror podcast Radio Rental, played by Rainn Wilson
- Terry Cartwright, in the UK coming-of-age TV teen sitcom The Inbetweeners, played by David Schaal (actor)
- Terry Colby, in the US drama thriller TV series Mr. Robot, played by Bruce Altman
- Terry Collier, in the UK sitcom The Likely Lads and its 1976 film, played by James Bolam
- Terry Crowley (The Shield), in the US crime drama TV series The Shield, played by Reed Diamond
- Terry Deegan, in the Irish TV soap opera Fair City, played by Julie Hale
- Terry Duckworth, in the UK TV soap opera Coronation Street, played by Nigel Pivaro
- Terry Fitzgerald, in the comic book series Spawn, played by D. B. Sweeney in the 1997 US superhero film
- Terry Fox, in the 1983 Canadian-American biographical film The Terry Fox Story, played by Eric Fryer (actor)
- Terry Fox, in the 2005 Canadian English-language TV film Terry, played by Shawn Ashmore
- Terry Fuckwitt, in the UK adult comic strip Viz
- Terry Gene Kase, in the US Batman comic book series published by DC Comics
- Terry Gibson, in the UK TV soap opera Brookside, played by Greg Wood (actor)
- Terry Gionoffrio, in the 1968 US psychological horror film Rosemary's Baby, played by Victoria Vetri
- Terry Griffy, in the Japanese The Prince of Tennis manga series, voiced by Maiko Itō
- Terry Harrison, in the Australian TV soap opera Prisoner, played by Brian Hannan
- Terry Hartford, in the US TV soap opera Falcon Crest, played by Laura Johnson
- Terry Hay, in the UK soap opera Hollyoaks, played by Conor Ryan and Stuart Wolfenden
- Terry Howes, in the UK TV soap opera EastEnders, played by Neal Swettenham
- Terry Husk, in the 2024 Canadian action thriller film The Order, played by Jude Law
- Terry Inglis, in the Australian TV soap opera Neighbours, played by Maxine Klibingaitis
- Terry Ives, in the US TV series Stranger Things, played by Aimee Mullins
- Terry Jeffords, in the US police procedural sitcom TV series Brooklyn Nine-Nine, played by Terry Crews
- Terry Kearney, in the Australian TV soap opera Neighbours, played by Peter Moon (comedian)
- Terry the Kid, in the manga and anime series Ultimate Muscle, voiced by Masaya Onosaka (Japanese) and Marc Thompson (US)
- Terry Kimple, in the US adult animated sitcom The Cleveland Show, voiced by Jason Sudeikis
- Terry Knowles, in the UK police procedural TV series The Bill, played by Alex Avery
- Terry Lake, in the US crime drama TV series Numbers, played by Sabrina Lloyd
- Terry Lee, in the action-adventure comic strip Terry and the Pirates, played by John Baer in the US adventure series of the same name
- Terry Maitland, in the 2018 US horror novel The Outsider
- Terry Markazian, in the US post-apocalyptic comedy drama TV series Daybreak, played by Chester Rushing
- Terry Maybeck, in the US series of children's novels Kingdom Keepers
- Terry McCaleb, in the 1998 mystery thriller novel Blood Work
- Terry McGinnis, the secret identity of DC Comics superhero Batman Beyond
- Terry Muldoon, in the US police drama TV series Public Morals, played by Edward Burns
- Terry Raymond, in the UK TV soap opera EastEnders, played by Gavin Richards
- Terry Rich, in the UK TV soap opera EastEnders, played by Gary Whelan
- Terry Sanders Jr., in the OVA anime series Mobile Suit Gundam: The 08th MS Team, voiced by Tesshō Genda (Japanese) and Steve Kramer (actor) (English)
- Terry Sawchuk, in the 2019 Canadian biographical sports film Goalie (film), played by Mark O'Brien (actor)
- Terry Silver, in The Karate Kid and Cobra Kai franchises, played by Thomas Ian Griffith
- Terry Sloane, DC Comics character
- Terry Spraggan, in the UK TV soap opera EastEnders, played by Terry Alderton
- Terry Sullivan, in the UK TV soap opera Brookside, played by Brian Regan
- Terry Teo, in the New Zealand book Terry and the Gunrunners, played by Adrian Bell in the 1985 children's television series of the same name
- Terry Williams, in the UK soap opera Hollyoaks, played by Ian Puleston-Davies
- Terry Woods (Emmerdale), in the UK TV soap opera Emmerdale, played by Billy Hartman

== Military ==
- "Terry Taliban", British Army slang for Taliban fighters during the Afghanistan War of 2001 to 2021

== See also ==
- Teri (given name)
- Tery
- Terri
- Terrie
- Terryglass
- Terryglass Castle
- Terryville (disambiguation)
- Therry
