= Terry Burgess =

Terry Burgess may refer to:

- Terry Burgess (footballer) (1934–2005), Australian VFL player
- Terry Burgess (businessman), South Australian mining businessman
