= Terry Ramadhani Kiunge =

Kenyan businesswoman and corporate executive

- Born: 1980 (age 45–46); Nyeri, Kenya
- Citizenship: Kenyan
- Education: Loretto High School; Kenyatta University; University of Liverpool
- Occupations: Businesswoman, human resource professional & corporate executive
- Years active: 2003–present
- Title: Deputy Ambassador of Kenya, New Delhi India, Chief executive officer at Kenya Medical Supplies Authority
- Spouse: Francis Ramadhani

Terry Ramadhani Kiunge, commonly referred to as Terry Ramadhani, is a Kenyan businesswoman, human resource professional and corporate executive. In May 2022, she was appointed as the chief executive officer (CEO) at Kenya Medical Supplies Authority (KEMSA). She previously worked as the director of human resources at Aga Khan University, based in Nairobi, Kenya. She also previously served as a board member on the KEMSA board of directors.

== Background and education ==
Ramadhani was born in Kenya c. 1980. She attended high school at Loretto High School, in Limuru, Kenya. She holds a Bachelor of Education degree from Kenyatta University, in Nairobi. Her Master of Business Administration degree was awarded by the University of Liverpool, in the United Kingdom. She graduated with a Certificate in Adaptive Leadership from the Harvard Kennedy School. In addition, she is a certified project management professional and a member of the Chartered Institute of Personnel and Development.

== Career ==
Ramadhanihas over two decades of business experience. She worked for a period of time in the executive office of the president of Kenya, in the President's Delivery Unit. While there, she monitored and oversaw the "implementation of the national government's Health projects".

One of her assignments at the medical supplies agency is to oversee the streamlining, rationalization and downsizing of the staff numbers at the authority. She is the first substantive CEO at KEMSA since Jonah Manjari was suspended in 2021, following procurement and other financial scandals at the agency during and after the COVID-19 pandemic.
