= Terryville =

Terryville may refer to:

- Terryville, Connecticut
- Terryville, Kentucky
- Terryville, New York
- Terryville, Texas
