= Therry =

Therry is a surname.

== List of people with the surname ==
- John Joseph Therry (1790–1864) was an Irish Roman Catholic priest in Sydney, Australia.
- Robert Therry (born 1947), French politician
- Roger Therry (1800–1874), Irish-Australian jurist

== See also ==
- Terry
