= Terry O'Neill =

Terry O'Neill may refer to:

- Terry O'Neill (feminist) (born c. 1953), American attorney, professor and activist for social justice, president of NOW
- Terry O'Neill (footballer) (born 1956), Australian rules footballer
- Terry O'Neill (martial artist) (born 1948), British martial artist and actor
- Terry O'Neill (photographer) (1938–2019), British photographer

== See also ==
- Terence O'Neill (1914–1990), Prime Minister of Northern Ireland
- Terry A. O'Neal (born 1973), American writer
