= Terry Winter =

Terry Winter may refer to:

- Terry Winter (televangelist) (1942–1998), Canadian televangelist
- Terry Winter (singer) (1941–1998), Brazilian singer-songwriter
- Terry Winter Owens (1941–2007), American composer and music educator
- Terence Winter (born 1960), American television- and film writer and producer

== See also ==
- Terry Winters (born 1949), American painter, draughtsman, and printmaker
