= Terry Pearce =

Terry Pearce may refer to:

- Trevor Mark "Terry" Pearce (1905–1986), New Zealand Test cricket umpire
- Terry Pearce (fl. 1992), futsal coach for Australia at the 1992 Paralympic Games for Persons with Mental Handicap
- Terry Pearce (fl. 2015), candidate in the 2015 Bracknell Forest Borough Council election, England
- Terry Pearce (fl. 2016), Australian competitor in the M60 2000 metres steeplechase at the 2016 World Masters Athletics Championships
- Terry Pearce (fl. 1970s), telescope maker affiliated with the Hampstead Scientific Society

== See also ==
- Teresa Pearce (born 1955), British politician
- Terry Peirce (1930–1984), Australian rules footballer
- Terry Pierce (born 1981), American football linebacker
