= Terry Owens =

Terry Owens may refer to:

- Terry Owens (American football) (1944–2012), American football offensive lineman
- Terry Winter Owens (1941–2007), American composer and music educator
