= Terrence King =

Terrence King may refer to:

- Terrence King, character in Necessary Roughness, see List of Necessary Roughness characters
- Terrence King, character in Person of Interest, see List of Person of Interest characters

== See also ==
- Terry King (disambiguation)
