= Terry French =

Terry French may refer to:

- Terry French (politician)
- Terry French (chef)
