= Terry Lee =

Terry Lee may refer to:

- Terry Lee (cricketer) (born 1940), Australian former cricketer and oenologist
- Terry Lee (footballer) (1952–1996), English professional footballer
- Terry Lee (baseball) (born 1962), American former baseball player
- Terry Lee Dill, American artist and sculptor
- Terry Lee Glaze (born 1964), American rock singer and musician
- Terry Lee Loewen, American perpetrator of the 2013 Wichita bombing attempt
- Terry Lee Miall, English past member of rock band Adam and the Ants
- Terry Lee Williams (born 1950), American retired university administrator, ecclesiastical bishop, and politician

== See also ==
- Terry Lees (born 1952), English former footballer
- Terry Lee Wells Nevada Discovery Museum, American science center and museum
