= Terry Rooney =

Terry Rooney may refer to:

- Terry Rooney (politician) (born 1950), British politician
- Terry Rooney (baseball coach) (born 1973), American baseball coach
