= Terry Butler (disambiguation) =

Terry Butler (born 1967), American death metal guitarist.

Terry Butler may also refer to:

- Terry Butler (American football) (born 1982), American football player
- Terry Butler (rugby league) (1958–2016), English rugby league footballer
- Terry Butler (soccer), Australian soccer player
- Geezer Butler (Terence Michael Joseph Butler, born 1949), British heavy metal bassist for Black Sabbath
