= Terry Scott (disambiguation) =

Terry Scott (1927–1994) was an English actor and comedian.

Terry Scott may also refer to:

- Terry Scott (sprinter) (born 1964), American sprinter
- Terry Scott (priest) (born 1956), Anglican minister
- Terry Scott Taylor (born 1950), American songwriter, record producer, writer, and founding member of the bands Daniel Amos and The Swirling Eddies
- Terry D. Scott, United States Navy sailor
- Terry Scott (basketball), college teammate and brother of NBA player Alvin Scott

== See also ==
- Terri Scott, principal of Northern Regional College, Northern Ireland
- Terrence Scott (born 1986), Canadian football wide receiver
