= Terry Dobson =

Terry Dobson may refer to:

- Terry Dobson (aikidoka) (1937–1992), American aikido pioneer, aikido teacher, and writer
- Terry Dobson (singer) (born 1952), British musician; founding member of the pop band Black Lace
