= Terry Farrell =

Terry Farrell may refer to:

- Terry Farrell (actress) (born 1963), American actress and former fashion model
- Sir Terry Farrell (architect) (1938–2025), British architect and urban designer
- Terry Farrell (politician) (born 1960), Canadian politician

== See also ==
- Terence Farrell (1798–1876), Irish sculptor
- Terry R. Ferrell (born 1962), American retired army lieutenant general
- Perry Farrell (born 1959), American singer, songwriter, and musician
