= Terry Gray =

Terry Gray may refer to:

- Terry Gray (footballer) (born 1954), English former footballer
- Terry Gray (ice hockey) (1938–2020), Canadian ice hockey player
- Terence Gray (1895–1986), Cambridge theatre producer and Taoist writer
