= Terry Johnston =

Terry Johnston may refer to:

- Terry C. Johnston (1947–2001), American writer
- Terry D. Johnston (born 1947), American politician from Minnesota

== See also ==
- Terry Johnson (disambiguation)
