= Terry Davey =

Australian rules footballer (born 1950)

Personal information
- Full name: Terry Davey
- Born: 23 July 1950 (age 76)
- Original team: Edithvale-Aspendale
- Height: 183 cm (6 ft 0 in)
- Weight: 85.5 kg (188 lb)

Playing career^{1}
Years	Club	Games (Goals)
1970	Melbourne	1 (0)
- ^{1} Playing statistics correct to the end of 1970.

Terry Davey (born 23 July 1950) is a former Australian rules footballer who played with Melbourne in the Victorian Football League (VFL).
