= Terry Alexander =

Terry Alexander may refer to:

- Terry Alexander (baseball) (born 1955), American baseball coach
- Terry Alexander (footballer) (1944–2013), Australian rules footballer for Collingwood
- Terence Alexander (1923–2009), English actor in Bergerac
- Terry Alexander (actor), American actor
- Terry Alexander (politician) (born 1955), member of the South Carolina House of Representatives
