= Terry McCarthy =

Terry McCarthy may refer to:

- Terry McCarthy (journalist), American journalist, writer, and CEO
- Terry McCarthy (politician), (born 1940), politician from the Australian Northern Territory
- Terry McCarthy (racing driver) (born 1964), racing driver from the United States
