= Terryville, Texas =

- Unincorporated community
- Location within Texas Location within the United States
- Coordinates: 29°11′24″N 97°04′16″W
- Country: United States
- State: Texas
- List of counties in Texas: DeWitt County
- Elevation: 240 ft (73 m)
- Time zone: UTC-6 (Central (CST))
  - Summer (DST): UTC-5 (CDT)

Terryville, Texas is a populated place at the intersection of Farm to Market Road 682 and Farm to Market Road 1447 in eastern DeWitt County, Texas. It was named after early settlers James Terry and John Terry, who opened a store there in 1852. James D. Terry served as DeWitt County judge from 1883 to 1891.

During the American Civil War, the community raised a cavalry company for the Confederate States Army.

A post office was established in 1869, the first school was built in 1870, and a Methodist church was established at a site now associated with the Old Terryville Cemetery.

In 1886, Terryville was relocated to a site three miles southeast of its original site, a mile from the Lavaca County line. The Old Terry Cemetery remains at the first townsite.

The town declined after 1900, and its post office was closed in December 1907, and its school in 1952. In 2000, Terryville's population was recorded as 40 residents.
