= Terry Regan =

Terry Regan is the name of:

- Terry Regan (footballer) (1926–2020), English footballer
- Terry Regan (rugby league) (born 1958), Australian former rugby league player
