= Terry and Me =

- Genre: Variety
- Presented by: Terry Dale; Alan Millar
- Country of origin: Canada
- Original language: English
- No. of seasons: 1

Production
- Producer: Frank Goodship
- Production location: Vancouver
- Running time: 30 minutes

Original release
- Network: CBC Television
- Release: 30 June – 29 September 1956

Terry and Me is a Canadian music variety television program that aired on CBC Television in 1956.

== Premise ==
The jazz music program was hosted by singer Terry Dale and her announcer husband Alan Millar. Dale was supported by Dave Pepper's eight-member band.

== Scheduling ==
Half-hour episodes were broadcast Saturdays 7:00 p.m. (Eastern) from 30 June to 29 September 1956.
