= Terry Porter (disambiguation) =

Terry Porter (born 1963) is an American college basketball coach and former player.

Terry Porter may also refer to:

- Terry Porter (pole vaulter) (born 1951), American Olympic pole vaulter
- Terry Porter (cross-country skier) (born 1953), American Olympic cross-country skier
- Terry Porter (sound engineer) (born 1954), American sound engineer
