= Terry Perkins =

Terry Perkins or Terence Perkins may refer to:

- Terry Perkins (died 2018), a perpetrator of the 2015 Hatton Garden safe deposit burglary
- Terry Perkins, winner of the 1974 TAA Formula Ford Driver to Europe Series
- Craig Douglas (born Terence Perkins, 1941), an English pop singer

== Fictional characters ==
- Terry Perkins, in the UK police procedural TV series The Bill, played by Bruce Byron
