= Terry Hart (disambiguation) =

Terry Hart is an astronaut.

Terry Hart may also refer to:

- Terry Hart (ice hockey), in the 1968–69 MJHL season
- Terry Hart, a fictional character in The Leech Woman
