= Terry Swartzberg =

American business journalist and public relations consultant

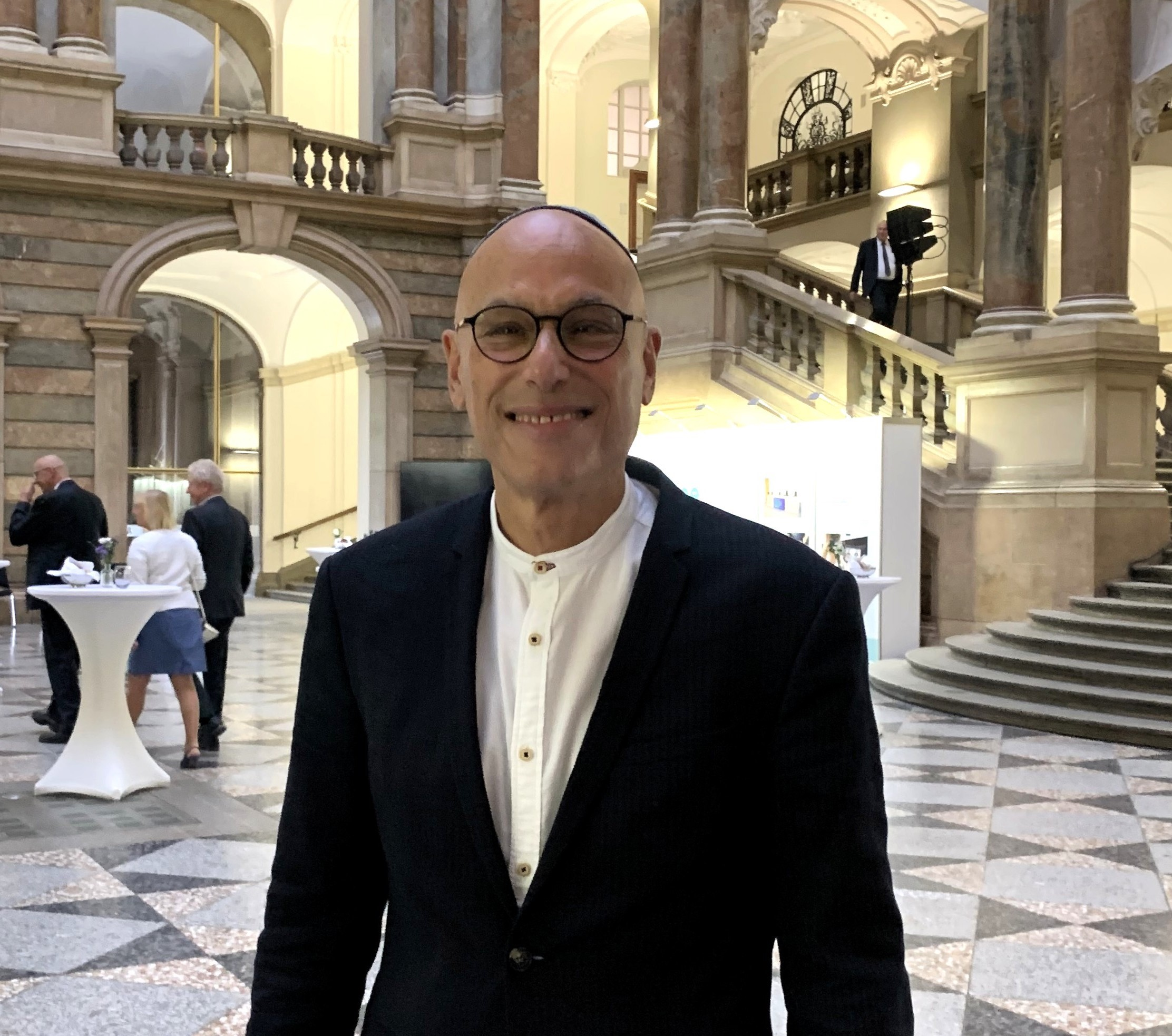
- Born: July 22, 1953 (age 72); Norwalk, Connecticut
- Occupations: Public Affairs Campaigner, Journalist
- Website: www.swartzberg.com

Terry Swartzberg (born July 22, 1953 in Norwalk, Connecticut) is an American public affairs campaigner and journalist. He is based in Munich, Germany and contributed for 25 years to the International Herald Tribune and other international publications. He is especially known for his work for the holocaust memorial project Stolpersteine and for his "reality check" - since 2012 he has been wearing a kippah in public.

== Life ==
Swartzberg grew up in New York City prior to moving with his family to Bihar, India, where his father, a cultural anthropologist, researched village life on a long-term basis. While in India, he attended a Jesuit boarding school. After studying at Brandeis University and in Paris for a semester in 1973, he transferred to the University of Wisconsin–Madison, where he earned a B.A. in 1976 in Asian Urban Studies. In 1976, he became an investigative journalist in Hong Kong. In 1980, he arrived in Berlin, where he launched his long-term relationship with the International Herald Tribune. In 1985, he moved to Munich, where he has lived since.

Since 1999, Swartzberg has been managing director of Swartzberg GmbH. This PA agency stages campaigns and provides content for a range of corporations and public sector institutions(including the United Nations and the European Union). The agency's clients include the Municipality of Munich and the Government of the State of Bavaria.

Swartzberg's pro bono portfolio of activities comprise his work for Munich's Reformed Jewish congregation Beth Shalom. He headed the project striving to build a synagogue according to plans compiled by Daniel Libeskind. He now handled public relations for the project. He was voted in 2011 chairperson of Munich's chapter of the Stolpersteine movement. Since then, he has led the campaign to lift Munich's ban on these sidewalk-level plaques, which commemorate victims of the Nazis. Munich is one of the very few cities in Europe to prohibit this form of commemoration.

Swartzberg's play Tzaddhik is based upon the Torah's principle of each generation's having 36 righteous. It examines humanity's self-inciting urge to commit violence. The play's tour in 2012 included performances in Augsburg, Stuttgart, Nuremberg, Munich and Hamburg. In the same year, Swartzberg and Jim Booras published the satirical self-help manual How to enjoy bad relationships.

On December 1, 2012, Swartzberg embarked upon his experiment of wearing a kippah outside of his home and of the Jewish community. His objectives are to counter antisemitism and to ascertain how Germany's society really feels about Jews. Disproving predictions to the contrary, all of his experiences have been positive. His "civil courage" led to one of his kippot being selected for inclusion in the collection of the Museum of the History of the Federal Republic of Germany in Bonn.
