= Terry Baker (disambiguation) =

Terry Baker (born 1941) is an American football quarterback.

Terry Baker may also refer to:

- Terry Baker (Canadian football) (born 1962), Canadian football player
- Terry Baker (footballer) (born 1965), English association footballer
- Terry Baker (politician) (born 1955), American politician
- Terry Baker, fictional character on Australian soap opera Neighbours
