= Terry Walker =

Terry Walker may refer to:

- Terry Walker (1913–1979), American actress, a/k/a Alice Dahl
- Terry Walker (footballer) (1921–1987), English inside forward
- Terence "Terry" Walker (born 1935), English Labour politician
