= Terry Slater =

Terry Slater may refer to:

- Terry Slater (geographer), English geographer
- Terry Slater (ice hockey) (1937–1991), Canadian ice hockey player and coach
