= Terry Shaw =

Terry Shaw may refer to:

- Terry Shaw (sportsman) (1937–2026), New Zealand cricketer and rugby union player
- Terry Shaw (rugby union) (born 1962), Welsh rugby union player
- Terrance Shaw (born 1973), American football cornerback
