= Terry Cutler =

Canadian cybersecurity specialist

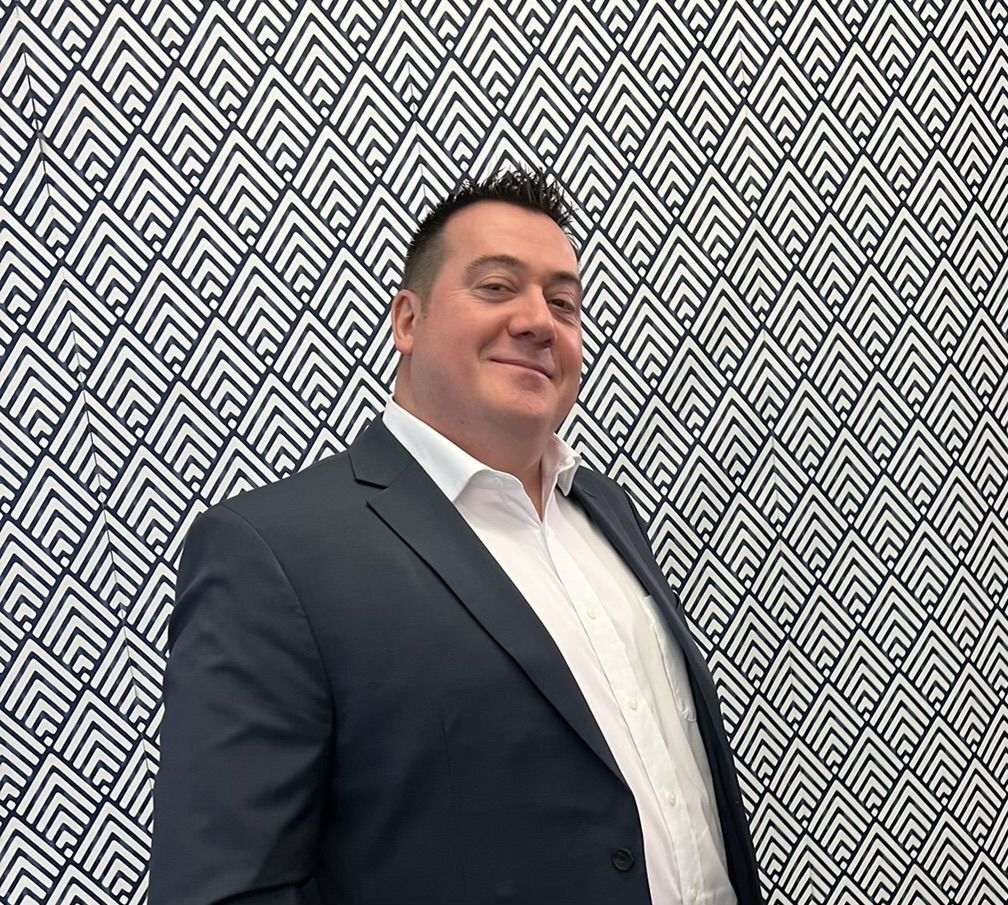
- Terry Cutler, pictured in 2026
- Occupation: Cybersecurity specialist
- Years active: 2005-present
- Website: terrycutler.com internetsafetyuniversity.com cyologylabs.com

Terry Cutler is a Canadian cybersecurity professional and teacher, often described as an "ethical hacker" for his work with cyber security. Cutler is the founder and CEO of Cyology Labs. He is also the creator of "Internet Safety University". Cyology Labs's focal is cyber security and data safety. Prior to founding Cyology Labs in 2015, Cutler founded Digital Locksmiths, Inc. Working on data security of cloud and mobile solutions. Cutler is an often cited source on Cyber security and has been featured on various televisions shows across Canada. He describes himself as a "cyologist", a trademarked term of his own invention for a person who works in cyber security.

== Cyber security work ==
From 2005 on Terry Cutler has worked in cyber security, starting out working with companies such as Novell Canada. As part of his work he became a Certified Ethical Hacker, leaning the methods of how hackers work and putting that knowledge to work to prevent illegal access to data or systems. Over the years his expertise in cyber security has led to him being featured on news shows across Canada when talking about online safety, identity theft, hacking and the rise of cyber bullying in the latter part of the 2000s and the 2010s. He would also become a member of both High Technology Crime Investigation Association (HTCIA), and the Center for Internet Security (CIS). Over the years Cutler has been a regular contributor for Securityweek.com and IT World Canada’s Cybersecurity Today Podcast.

In 2011 Cutler left Novell Canada and founded Digital Locksmiths, Inc., a Montreal-based company that focuses on data security and defense, especially in cloud and mobile solutions, and also served as its chief technology officer. In 2013 the company introduced a product known as S.P.E.C., (Security, Privacy, Electronic, Concierge) designed to help keep data safe. Cutler was asked to use his expertise to assist author Robert Beggs as a technical reviewer for his book "Mastering Kali Linux for Advanced Penetration Testing", later calling it "a must have for your IT security library". He would go on to create "Internet Safety University" e-learning courses. The courses are designed to teach individuals how to keep their data safe and how to avoid unintentional breaches of personal data when online. The course also addresses subjects such as sexting and cyberbullying, advising parents on how to identify it and how to deal with it if it happens to their children. Cutler later described this initiative as "giving back to the community".

In 2015 Cutler left Digital Locksmiths, Inc. to found Cyology Labs in Montreal, Quebec. Cyology Labs focuses on cyber security and security testing, with Cutler serving as company's chief executive officer. On his website he describes himself and his co-workers as "the white hats" as they fight crime, liking them to forensic experts as depicted on television shows such as CSI: Crime Scene Investigation. and 24. In addition to his work with Cyology Labs he also served as the vice-president of cyber security for SIRCO, a company that specializes in investigation and protection services as well as cybercrime and industrial and corporate espionage.

In April 2016 Cutler was appointed to the national council of the Canadian Cybersecurity Alliance (CCA) as one of twelve people responsible for coordinating the CCA efforts with over 80 different groups who work with the CCA on the subject of cyber-security. Cutler was appointed the communications lead in the hope it would create more cooperation between various cyber security groups as he remarked "We all complement each other, but nobody's talking to each other," and went on to state that because of the CCA initiative "you’ll have some of the brightest minds across Canada collaborating together."

In 2022, Cutler and Cyology Labs introduced Fraudster, a free mobile application that provides fraud alerts and cybersecurity information. The app was designed to raise public awareness of online scams and digital security issues.

=== Cyologist ===
In May 2016 Terry Cutler created the term "cyologist" to describe someone who works in the field of cyber security and was granted a trademark for the term in Canada. The trademark definition listed the term, among other activities, as "consulting services in the field of testing and assessing networked devices for cyber security vulnerabilities and risks" as well as "educational services, namely conducting courses, seminars, and training in the field of internet security and internet safety and responsible use of the internet, computers and internet enabled devices;".

In a 2013 article Cutler described various aspects of the work at Digital Locksmiths, and later at Cyology Labs, which in this instance was trying to gain access to a company's system and obtain sensitive data as part of the company's analysis. The work includes trying to gain entry through the firewalls from the outside through various means such as keystroke logging or denial-of-service attacks. In addition to computer hacking Cutler would use other tricks to get inside access, describing a strategy where he would leave a USB key in a bathroom and wait for someone in the company to plug it in. The example cited was used to illustrate other ways hackers try to gain access to sensitive data, highlighting often ignored aspects of data security.

== Awards And Honors ==
In 2017, Cutler was named Cybersecurity Educator of the Year by Canadian Security Magazine. He was listed by IFSEC Global among the Top 20 Most Influential People in Cybersecurity in 2018. 2019, and 2020, and again in 2023 as one of the Top 20 Most Influential Security Professionals.

In 2025, he was recognized by CISO Platform as one of the Top 100 CISOs (Global). Cutler has also featured as a national cybersecurity commentator on Canadian outlets such as CBC News, CTV News, Global News, IT World Canada, and The Globe and Mail.

== Personal life ==
Outside of his work Cutler is a long-time practitioner of up-close magic, performing tricks and illusions for his family and friends. He is also a practitioner of the martial arts form aikido.
