= Terry Robinson =

Terry Robinson may refer to:

- Terry Earl Robinson, American biopsychologist and neuroscientist
- Terry Robinson (football chairman), English football chairman and director
- Terry Robinson (footballer) (born 1929), English retired footballer
- Terence Robinson (born 1948), English wrestler

== Fictional characters ==
- Terry Robinson (Neighbours), in the Australian TV soap opera Neighbours, played by Maxine Klibingaitis
