= Terry L. Bellamy =

Public servant

Director of Public Works and Transportation
- In office December 2018 – September 2021

Personal details
- Born: Charlotte, North Carolina, U.S.
- Spouse: Marcia Purvis Bellamy
- Children: 3
- Education: North Carolina Agricultural and Technical State University, Iowa State University
- Profession: Government executive

Terry L. Bellamy served as the director of public works and transportation for Prince George's County, Maryland from December 2018 until September 2021. Prior to his current position, he served as director of transportation for the City of Durham, North Carolina and assistant director for Transportation Planning for the City of San Antonio.

== City of Durham ==
From 2016 to 2018, Bellamy introduced Vision Zero to the City of Durham. Vision Zero is an approach that recognizes no traffic fatalities or serious injuries are acceptable. Dock less bike share was introduced to Durham to include development of citywide policies on operations and maintaining both bike and electric scooters.

== City of San Antonio ==
Since joining the San Antonio Department of Transportation and Capital Improvements, Bellamy has provided leadership on the city's 2040 Multimodal Transportation Plan "SA Tomorrow". In this role, he aims to improve transportation in and around the city by accounting for the time it takes to get from one point to another.

Bellamy serves on the San Antonio Mobility Coalition "SAMCo" Executive Committee, and VIA Metropolitan Transit Advisory Committee, and is Vice Chair of the Alamo Area Metropolitan Planning Organization's Technical Advisory Committee.

== District Department of Transportation ==
Bellamy was named acting director of the District of Columbia Department of Transportation in May 2010 by Mayor Vincent Gray, and was confirmed as Director in August 2010 by the Council of the District of Columbia. He had been serving as the Interim Director since January 2010. During the administration of Mayor Adrian Fenty, Bellamy served as deputy director of Operations (May 2009 - December 2009) under Gabe Klein and as associate director for Transportation Operations Administration (March 2008 - May 2009) under Emeka Moneme.
