= Terry Henry =

Terence or Terry Henry may refer to:

- Terry Henry (curler) in 1986 Labatt Brier
- Terence Henry, actor in Scene of the Crime (1996 film)
- Terry Henry (DOJ), see Gouled Hassan Dourad

== See also ==
- Thierry Henry, French footballer
