= Terry McDonald =

Terry McDonald or Terence McDonald may refer to:

- Terry McDonald (footballer) (born 1939), English football player
- Terry McDonald (ice hockey) (born 1955), Canadian ice hockey player
- Mac McDonald (born Terence McDonald 1949), American actor who plays Captain Hollister in Red Dwarf

== See also ==
- Teri MacDonald (born 1963), Canadian racing driver
