= Terry Moran (disambiguation) =

Terry Moran may refer to:

- Terry Moran (born 1959), American journalist
- Terry Moran (Australian civil servant), (born 1947), former Secretary of the Department of the Prime Minister and Cabinet
- Terry Moran (British civil servant) (born 1960), British civil servant and public administrator

== See also ==
- Teri Moren (born 1969), the current head coach of the Indiana University women's basketball team
- Terry Morgan (born 1948), British engineer
