= Terry Scanlon (disambiguation) =

Terry Scanlon (1913–1996) was an Australian comedian and pantomime artist.

Terry Scanlon may also refer to:

- Terry Scanlon, coach in Victorian Amateur Football Association
- Terry Scanlon, character in The Green Death
- Terry Scanlon, musician on Flex Your Head
