= Terry Turner =

Terry Turner may refer to:

- Terry Turner (baseball) (1881–1960), American baseball infielder
- Bonnie and Terry Turner (born 1947; Terry), American husband-and-wife team of screenwriters and producers
- Terry Turner (sport shooter), British sports shooter
- Terence Turner (anthropologist) (1935–2015), American anthropologist

== Fictional characters ==
- Terence Turner, in the UK TV soap opera Emmerdale, played by Stephen Marchant and Nick Brimble
