= Terry Sullivan =

Terry Sullivan may refer to:

- Terry Sullivan (athlete) (1935–2019), Zimbabwean Olympic athlete
- Terry Sullivan (Australian politician) (born 1949), former Australian politician
- Teresa A. Sullivan (born 1949), sociologist and former president of the University of Virginia
- Terry Sullivan (drummer) (1938–2026), drummer in the British band Renaissance
- Terry Sullivan (bowls) (born 1935), Welsh bowler
- Terry Sullivan (political consultant), American political consultant
- Terry Sullivan (Brookside), a fictional character in the British soap opera Brookside

== See also ==
- Terence M. O'Sullivan (born 1955), American labor leader
- Terence O'Sullivan (politician) (1924–1997), Irish politician
- Terence Patrick O'Sullivan (1913–1970), British civil engineer
- Terry O'Sullivan (1915–2006), American actor
