= Terry O'Donnell =

Terry O'Donnell may refer to:

- Terry O'Donnell (footballer), English footballer and manager
- Terry O'Donnell (politician) (born 1963), American politician in the Oklahoma House of Representatives

== See also ==
- Terence O'Donnell (1924–2001), American writer
- Terrence O'Donnell (born 1946), associate justice of the Supreme Court of Ohio
