= Terry Moore =

Terry Moore may refer to:

- Terry Moore (actress) (born 1929), American film actress
- Terry Moore (Australian footballer) (born 1951), Australian rules footballer
- Terry Moore (baseball) (1912–1995), American Major League Baseball player
- Terry Moore (broadcaster) (1936–2018), Canadian broadcaster, actor and television personality
- Terry Moore (cartoonist) (born 1954), American comic book writer and artist
- Terry Moore (musician), New Zealand musician
- Terry Moore (politician) (born 1952), American politician from Montana
- Terry Moore (soccer) (born 1958), retired Canadian soccer player
- Terry A. Moore (born 1965), Alabama jurist
- Terry Moore (American football) (born 2004), American football safety
- Terry Moore (rugby union), Irish international rugby union player

== See also ==
- Terry Moor (born 1952), American former tennis player
- Terence Moore, American sportswriter
- Terence Moore (American football) (born 1987), American former football linebacker
