= Terry Ray =

Terry Ray may refer to:

- Terry Ray (gridiron football) (born 1969), retired American and Canadian football defensive back and linebacker
- Terry Ray (actor) (born 1961), American actor, screenwriter, and producer
- Terry Ray (boxer) (born 1963), American former professional boxer who competed from 1986 to 2001
- Terry Ray (1915–2003), American film actress, better known as Ellen Drew
