= Terry Pearson =

Terry Pearson may refer to:

- Terry Pearson (baseball) (born 1971), Major League Baseball pitcher
- Terry Pearson (immunologist) (born 1946), Canadian biochemist, immunologist, educator and biotechnology entrepreneur
