= Terry Amburgey =

American engineer

- Spouse: North Carolina State University
- Engineering career
- Discipline: Aeronautical engineering
- Institutions: Mississippi State University

Terry Amburgey is an American engineer, currently a William L. Giles Professor at Mississippi State University and an Elected Fellow of The International Academy of Wood Science.
