= Terry Morrison =

Terry Morrison is the name of:

- Terry Morrison (politician), state legislator from Maine
- Terry Morrison (academic), Canadian academic
- Terry Morrison (rugby union) (1951–2021), New Zealand rugby player
