= Terry McBride =

Terry McBride may refer to:

- Terry McBride (CEO) (born 1960), Canadian CEO of Nettwerk Music Group
- Terry McBride (musician) (born 1958), American country songwriter and singer
