= Terry Ball =

Terry Ball may refer to:

- Terry B. Ball (born 1955), dean of religious education at Brigham Young University
- Terry Ball (ice hockey) (born 1944), Canadian hockey player
- Terry Major-Ball (1932–2007), English columnist, banker, and media personality
