= Terry Thompson =

Terry Thompson may refer to:

- Terry Thompson (politician), member of the Missouri House of Representatives
- Terry Thompson (Oregon politician), member of the Oregon House of Representatives in the 70th Oregon Legislative Assembly
- Terry J. Thompson (born 1971), American jockey
- Terry Thompson, exotic animal owner responsible for the Zanesville animal escape
- Terri Thompson, American business journalist
