= Terry McGovern =

Terry McGovern may refer to:

- Terry McGovern (boxer) (1880–1918), American boxer who held the world bantamweight and featherweight titles
- Terry McGovern (actor) (born 1942), American film actor, television broadcaster, radio personality, voice-over specialist, and acting instructor
- Terry M. McGovern, American educator and activist
- Terry McGovern (rugby league), Australian rugby league player
- Teresa McGovern (died 1994), daughter of U.S. political figure George McGovern
