= Terry Fitzgerald =

Terry Fitzgerald may refer to:

- Terry Fitzgerald (comics), a character of the Spawn comic book series published by Image Comics
- Terry Fitzgerald (producer) (born 1968), producer of the Spawn comics series
- Terry Fitzgerald (footballer) (born 1952), Australian rules footballer for Hawthorn
- Terry Fitzgerald (surfer), featured in Morning of the Earth surfing movie

== See also ==
- Maureen Fitzgerald Terry, Maine politician
