= Terence Young =

Terence or Terry Young may refer to:

- Terence Young (director) (1915–1994), British film director
- Terence Young (politician) (born 1952), Canadian Conservative Party politician
- Terence Young (writer) (born 1953), Canadian writer
- Terry Young (American politician) (born 1948), former mayor of Tulsa, Oklahoma
- Terry Young (Australian politician) (born 1968), Liberal MP for Longman
- Terry Young (table tennis) (born 1978), table tennis player from England

== See also ==
- Young (surname)
