= Terry Jackson =

Terry Jackson may refer to:

- Terry Jackson (cornerback) (born 1955), American former football cornerback
- Terry Jackson (running back) (born 1976), American former football running back
- Terri Jackson, executive director of the Women's National Basketball Players Association
