= Terry Board =

Terry Board may refer to:

- Terry Board (footballer, born 1945) (1945–2019), Australian rules footballer for Carlton from 1965 to 1968
- Terry Board (footballer, born 1968), Australian rules footballer for Fitzroy from 1988 to 1991
