= Terry McGee (footballer) =

Australian rules footballer (1945–2020)

Personal information
- Full name: Terence McGee
- Born: 18 March 1945
- Died: 31 October 2020 (aged 75)
- Original team: Albert Park
- Height: 180 cm (5 ft 11 in)
- Weight: 78 kg (172 lb)

Playing career^{1}
| Years | Club | Games (Goals) |
| 1962–63 | South Melbourne | 16 (2) |
- ^{1} Playing statistics correct to the end of 1963.

Terry McGee (18 March 1945 – 31 October 2020) was an Australian rules footballer who played with South Melbourne in the Victorian Football League (VFL).
