= Terry Kent =

Terry Kent may refer to:

- Terry Kent (canoeist) (born 1962), American sprint canoeist
- Terry Kent (footballer) (born 1939), English former footballer
