= Terry Cavanagh =

Terry Cavanagh may refer to:

- Terry Cavanagh (politician) (1926–2017), Canadian politician
- Terry Cavanagh (developer) (born 1984), Irish video game designer

== See also ==
- Terry Kavanagh, American comic book editor and writer
