= Terry French (chef) =

American chef

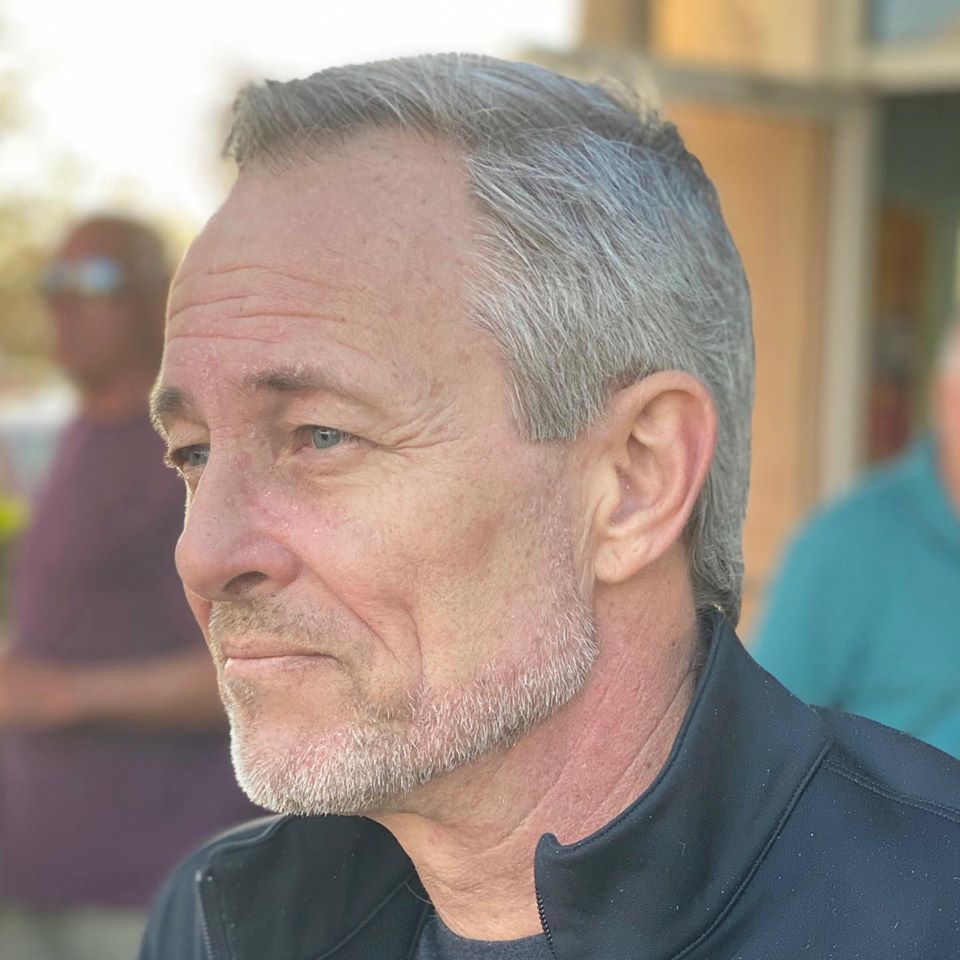
- French in 2020
- Born: Evansville, Indiana, United States
- Education: Scottsdale Culinary Institute
- Culinary career
- Previous restaurants
- Emma's Rotisserie, Somers Point, New Jersey; Rebel Catering, Egg Harbor Township, New Jersey

Terry French is an American chef, winner of Season 2 of the Food Network's Extreme Chef, and founder of the charity Chefs for Life.

== Early life and education ==
French was born in Evansville, Indiana. He attended Castle High School, and grew up foraging, hunting, fishing, and cooking with his family. Prior to attending culinary school, he served in the U.S. Navy, completing two world tours. French spent nine years as a tournament fisherman, nine years as first mate on a sport-fishing boat, and is a United States Coast Guard licensed captain.

French received his culinary degree from Scottsdale Culinary Institute in Scottsdale, Arizona, after which he did several apprenticeships in European, Continental, and Asian cuisine.

== Career ==
French has served as corporate chef and executive chef at several restaurants, including Emma's Rotisserie in Somers Point and Rebel Catering in Egg Harbor, both in New Jersey.

In 2012, he was invited to participate in the Food Network's Extreme Chef program, which takes competitors out of the kitchen and into some of the most extreme locations in the world. French was named champion of Extreme Chef.

French is also the founder and managing director of Chefs for Life, a charity organization that works to feed the hungry around the world, educate them about cooking and healthy eating, promote the appreciation of food and nature, and provide resources to combat hunger. He also works to support the charity Share Our Strength, which runs the campaign No Kid Hungry in the United States.

In 2015, French hosted Chef's Plate, a traveling culinary competition in St. Louis, Missouri. Also in 2015, he was a featured chef at the World Food Championships.

In 2015, 2016, and 2017, French was invited as one of the nation's top celebrity chefs to share his culinary know-how on the World Culinary Showcase stage.
