= Terry C W Wong =

Hong Kong jockey

Terry C W Wong (born 30 October 1984) was a champion apprentice in 2006/07. He rode seven winners in 2009/10 for a career total of 89, but could add only one more in 2010/2011, a season in which he had limited opportunities.

== Performance ==
Seasons	Total Rides	No. of Wins	No. of 2nds	No. of 3rds	No. of 4ths	Stakes won
2010/2011	195	1	5	11	5	HK$2,463,150
