= Terry Bates =

Terry Bates may refer to:

- Terry Bates (American Dad!), in the US animated sitcom American Dad!, voiced by Mike Barker (producer)
- Terry Bates (EastEnders), in the UK TV soap opera EastEnders, played by Nicholas Ball (actor)
