= Terry Casey =

Terry Casey may refer to:

- Terry Casey (Royal Navy sailor), Warrant Officer of the Naval Service
- Terry Casey (trade unionist) (1920–1987), British trade union leader
- Terry Casey (ice hockey) (1943–1967), American ice hockey player
- Terry Casey (rugby union) (born 1938), Australian former rugby union player
