= Terry King (disambiguation) =

Terry King is an American poker player.

Terry King may also refer to:

- Terry Lee King, 2001 murder victim in Florida, USA
- Terry King, former member of American vocal group The Drifters

== See also ==
- Terrence King (disambiguation)
