= Terry Tate (Australian footballer) =

Australian rules footballer

Personal information
- Born: 4 April 1943
- Original team: Coragulac
- Height: 173 cm (5 ft 8 in)
- Weight: 76 kg (168 lb)

Playing career^{1}
Years	Club	Games (Goals)
1961	Geelong	2 (0)
1964–65	South Melbourne	9 (8)
Total		11 (8)
- ^{1} Playing statistics correct to the end of 1965.

Terry Tate (born 4 April 1943) is a former Australian rules footballer who played with Geelong and South Melbourne in the Victorian Football League (VFL).
