= Terry Moloney =

Terry Moloney may refer to:

- Terry Moloney (filmmaker) (born 1969), American writer, producer, director and editor
- Terry Moloney (hurler) (1939–2008), retired Irish hurler
