= Terry Taylor (disambiguation) =

Terry Taylor (born 1955) is an American retired professional wrestler.

Terry Taylor may also refer to:

- Terry Taylor (American football) (born 1961), former professional American football player
- Terry Taylor (baseball) (born 1964), Major League Baseball pitcher for the Seattle Mariners in 1988
- Terry Taylor (basketball) (born 1999), American basketball player
- Terry Taylor (musician) (born 1948), British rock musician
- Terry Scott Taylor (born 1950), American songwriter
- Terry Taylor (footballer) (born 2001), Scottish-born Welsh footballer
- Terry R. Taylor (1952–2023), American sports editor

== See also ==
- Terrance Taylor (American football) (born 1986), American football defensive tackle
