= Terry L. McMillan =

American football player and coach

Playing career
- 1965–1968: Southern Miss
- Position: Quarterback

Coaching career (HC unless noted)
- 1969–1971: Biloxi HS (MS) (assistant)
- 1972–1990: Mississippi College (assistant)
- 1991–1999: Mississippi College

Head coaching record
- Overall: 45–42–5 (college); 24–7 (high school)
- Tournaments: 1–1 (NCAA D-II playoffs)

Accomplishments and honors

Championships
- 1 ASC (1997)

Awards
- ASC Coach of the Year (1997)

Terry L. McMillan is an American former football player and coach. He served as the head football coach at Mississippi College from 1991 to 1999, compiling a record of 45–42–5. McMillan played college football at the University of Southern Mississippi, where he lettered four times as a quarterback.

== Head coaching record ==
=== College ===
Year	Team	Overall	Conference	Standing	Bowl/playoffs
Mississippi College Choctaws (Gulf South Conference) (1991–1995)
1991	Mississippi College	7–4–1	4–1–1	T–2nd	L NCAA Division III Quarterfinal
1992	Mississippi College	4–5–1	2–3–1	4th	
1993	Mississippi College	6–3–1	3–3–1	5th	
1994	Mississippi College	4–5–1	2–5	6th	
1995	Mississippi College	2–7–1	2–7–1	9th	
Mississippi College Choctaws (NCAA Division II independent) (1996)
1996	Mississippi College	4–6			
Mississippi College Choctaws (American Southwest Conference) (1997–1999)
1997	Mississippi College	8–2	4–1	1st	
1998	Mississippi College	4–5	2–5	T–5th	
1999	Mississippi College	6–4	3–4	T–4th	
Mississippi College:		45–42–5	22–29–4		
Total:		45–42–5			
National championship Conference title Conference division title or championship game berth
