= Terry Cahill =

Terry Cahill may refer to:

- Terry Cahill (footballer, born 1955), Australian footballer for Collingwood
- Terry Cahill (footballer, born 1958), Australian footballer for Essendon
