= Terry Sanderson =

Terry Sanderson is the name of:

- Terry Sanderson (lacrosse) (1952–2014), Canadian lacrosse coach and general manager
- Terry Sanderson (writer) (1946–2022), British secularist and gay rights activist
