= Kenya Medical Supplies Agency =

Kenya Medical Supplies Authority
- Type: Public
- Industry: Logistics
- Founded: 2000
- Headquarters: Nairobi, Kenya
- Key people: Amb. Solomon Karanja; Chairperson; Dr. John Munyu; Chief Executive Officer
- Products: Drugs
- Website: www.kemsa.co.ke

The Kenya Medical Supplies Agency (KEMSA) is a specialized Government medical logistics provider for Ministries of Medical Services/Public Health-supported health facilities and programmes in Kenya.

== Background ==
KEMSA was established as a state corporation under Cap 446, through the Kenya Medical Supplies Agency Order 2000 (Legal Notice No.17 of 11 February 2000). It plays the role of procuring, storing and distributing health commodities for the public sector.

The strengthening of KEMSA has been identified as a key project of Kenya's Vision 2030

== Role in health care ==
- Providing a secure source of drugs and other medical supplies for public health institutions
- Developing and operating a viable commercial service for the procurement and sale of drugs and other medical supplies
- Advising the Health Management Boards and the general public on matters related to the procurement, cost effectiveness and rational use of drugs and other medical supplies.

== See also ==
- Healthcare in Kenya
- Social Health Authority
