= Terry Fisher =

Terry Fisher may refer to:

- William W. Fisher, American legal scholar
- Terry Louise Fisher (1946–2025), American screenwriter and producer
- Terry Fisher (soccer) (born 1949), American soccer coach
- Terry Fisher (racing driver) (born 1962), American race car driver
