= Terry Walsh =

Terry Walsh may refer to:

- Terry Walsh (actor), British actor and stuntman
- Terry Walsh (field hockey), Australian field hockey coach and player
- Terry Walsh (footballer), Australian rules footballer
- Terry Walsh (Love Island), English carpenter
