= Terence Donovan =

Terence Donovan may refer to:

- Terence Donovan, Baron Donovan (1898–1971), British Labour Party Member of Parliament, 1945–1950, Law Lord, 1964–1971
- Terence Donovan (actor) (1935–2026), English-Australian actor, and father of actor/singer Jason Donovan
- Terence Donovan (photographer) (1936–1996), English photographer and film director

Terry Donovan may refer to:

- Terry Donovan (footballer) (born 1958), Irish footballer
- Terry Donovan (businessman), co-founder of Rockstar Games
- Terry Donovan (archer) (born 1944), Australian Olympic archer
