= Terry Burgess (footballer) =

Australian rules footballer

Personal information
- Full name: Terry Burgess
- Born: 20 July 1934
- Died: 28 August 2005 (aged 71)
- Original team: City South Launceston
- Height: 171 cm (5 ft 7 in)
- Weight: 70 kg (154 lb)

Playing career^{1}
Years	Club	Games (Goals)
1959	St Kilda	5 (1)
- ^{1} Playing statistics correct to the end of 1959.

Terry Burgess (20 July 1934 – 28 August 2005) was an Australian rules footballer who played with St Kilda in the Victorian Football League (VFL).
