= Terry Childs =

Terry Childs may refer to:

- Terry Childs (network administrator), American former network administrator
- Terry Childs (serial killer) (1955–2023), American serial killer
