= Terry Hogan =

Terry Hogan may refer to:

- Hulk Hogan (1953–2025), American professional wrestler
- Terence Hogan, Terry "Lucky Tel" Hogan (1931–1995), English professional criminal
