= Terry Lewis =

Terry or Terence Lewis may refer to:

- Terry Lewis (police officer) (1928–2023), Queensland police commissioner who was convicted and jailed for corruption
- Terry Lewis (politician) (1935–2026), British politician
- Terry Lewis (judge), Florida judge who oversaw the 2000 US presidential election recount
- Terry Lewis (footballer) (1937–1975), Australian rules footballer
- Terry Lewis (American football) (born 1962), American football player
- Terence Lewis (choreographer) (born 1975), Indian dancer and choreographer
- Terry Lewis, member of American R&B and pop songwriting team Jimmy Jam and Terry Lewis
- Terry Lewis, guitarist with British soul band Mamas Gun
