= Terry Shannon =

Terry Shannon may refer to:

- Terry Shannon (politician) (born 1962), Irish politician and Lord Mayor of Cork.
- Terry Shannon (IT) (1952-2005), American IT consultant and journalist.

== See also ==
- Terrence Shannon Jr. (born 2000), American basketball player
