= Terry Crawford =

Terry Crawford may refer to:

- Terrayne Crawford (born 1945), American retired actress
- Terri Crawford, Canadian rock singer and children's entertainer
- Terri Crawford Hansen (born 1953), Native American environmental journalist
- Terry Hull Crawford, American women's track coach
