= Terry Dolan =

Terry Dolan may refer to:

- Terry Dolan (footballer) (born 1950), English former footballer and current manager
- Terry Dolan (activist) (1950–1986), American Republican Party political operative
- Terence Dolan (1943–2019), Irish lexicographer and radio personality
- Terry Dolan (musician), American musician
- Terry Dolan, founder and owner of Dolan Bikes
