= Terry Crowley (disambiguation) =

Terry Crowley may refer to:

- Terry Crowley (born 1947), American former MLB player and coach
- Terry Crowley (linguist) (1953–2005), English linguist

== Fictional characters ==
- Terry Crowley (The Shield), in the US crime drama TV series The Shield, played by Reed Diamond
