= Terry O'Brien =

Terry O'Brien can refer to:

- Terry O'Brien (footballer) (1918–2011), Australian rules footballer
- Terry O'Brien (luger) (born 1943), American Olympic luger
