= Terry Copley =

Terry Copley may refer to:

- Terence Copley (1946–2011), British academic and author
- Teri Copley (born 1961), American actress and model
