= Terry Matthews (disambiguation) =

Terry Matthews (born 1943) is a Welsh-Canadian business magnate.

Terry Matthews may also refer to:

- Terry Matthews (footballer) (1936–2026), English footballer
- Terry Matthews (rugby league), Australian rugby league player

== See also ==
- Terry Mathews (1964–2012), American baseball player
