= Terry Bruce =

Terry Bruce may refer to:

- Terry Bruce (politician) (born 1975), Republican member of the Kansas Senate
- Terry L. Bruce (1944–2026), American politician, lawyer and educator from Illinois
