= Terry Norris =

Terry Norris may refer to:

- Terry Norris (boxer) (born 1967), American boxer
- Terry Norris (actor) (1930–2023), Australian actor and politician
- Terry Norris (American politician), member of the Vermont House of Representatives
