= Terry Jeffrey =

Terry Jeffrey could refer to:

- Terence P. Jeffrey, American journalist and commentator
- Terry Mike Jeffrey, American singer, songwriter, multi-instrumentalist, musical director, arranger, and actor
