= Terry Scales =

Terry Scales may refer to:

- Terry Scales (painter) (born 1933), English painter and writer
- Terry Scales (footballer) (born 1951), English footballer and manager
