= Terry Black (Canadian football) =

Canadian football player

Profile
- Position: Halfback

Personal information
- Born: 1947 (age 78–79); Barrie, Ontario, Canada
- Listed height: 6 ft 1 in (1.85 m)
- Listed weight: 205 lb (93 kg)

Career history
- 1969: Ottawa Rough Riders

Awards and highlights
- Grey Cup champion (1969)

Terry Black (born 1947) is a Canadian former footballer who played for the Ottawa Rough Riders. He won the Grey Cup with them in 1969. He previously played junior football with the Ottawa Sooners who played in the 1968 Little Grey Cup in Edmonton, Alberta.
