= Terry Wright =

Terrance or Terry Wright is the name of:

- Terry Wright (defensive back) (born 1964), American player of gridiron football
- Terry Wright (rugby union) (born 1963), New Zealand rugby union player
- Terry Wright (wide receiver) (born 1997), American football wide receiver
- T. M. Wright (1947–2015), writer of horror fiction, speculative fiction, and poetry
