= Terry Lee Dill =

American sculptor

Terry Lee Dill is an American artist and sculptor, specializing in large unique sculptures.

His work has appeared in the Arkansas Arts Center Foundation Collection, the City of Birmingham Permanent Sculptures, the Sally Hawkins Gallery in SoHo, the Cadman Plaza in Brooklyn, the Macomb Center for the Performing Arts, Upstairs at the Market Gallery, the Detroit Receiving Hospital, Wards Island in New York City and the Nassau County Museum.

== Biography ==
Terry was born in Hutchinson, Kansas, received a BFA from Drake University, an MA and MFA in sculpture from the University of Iowa. He later worked in New York City and then Detroit. While in Detroit, Terry earned an MA in Architecture from Cranbrook Academy of Art. Terry has also exhibited with Marina DeBris.
