= Terry A. O'Neal =

American writer

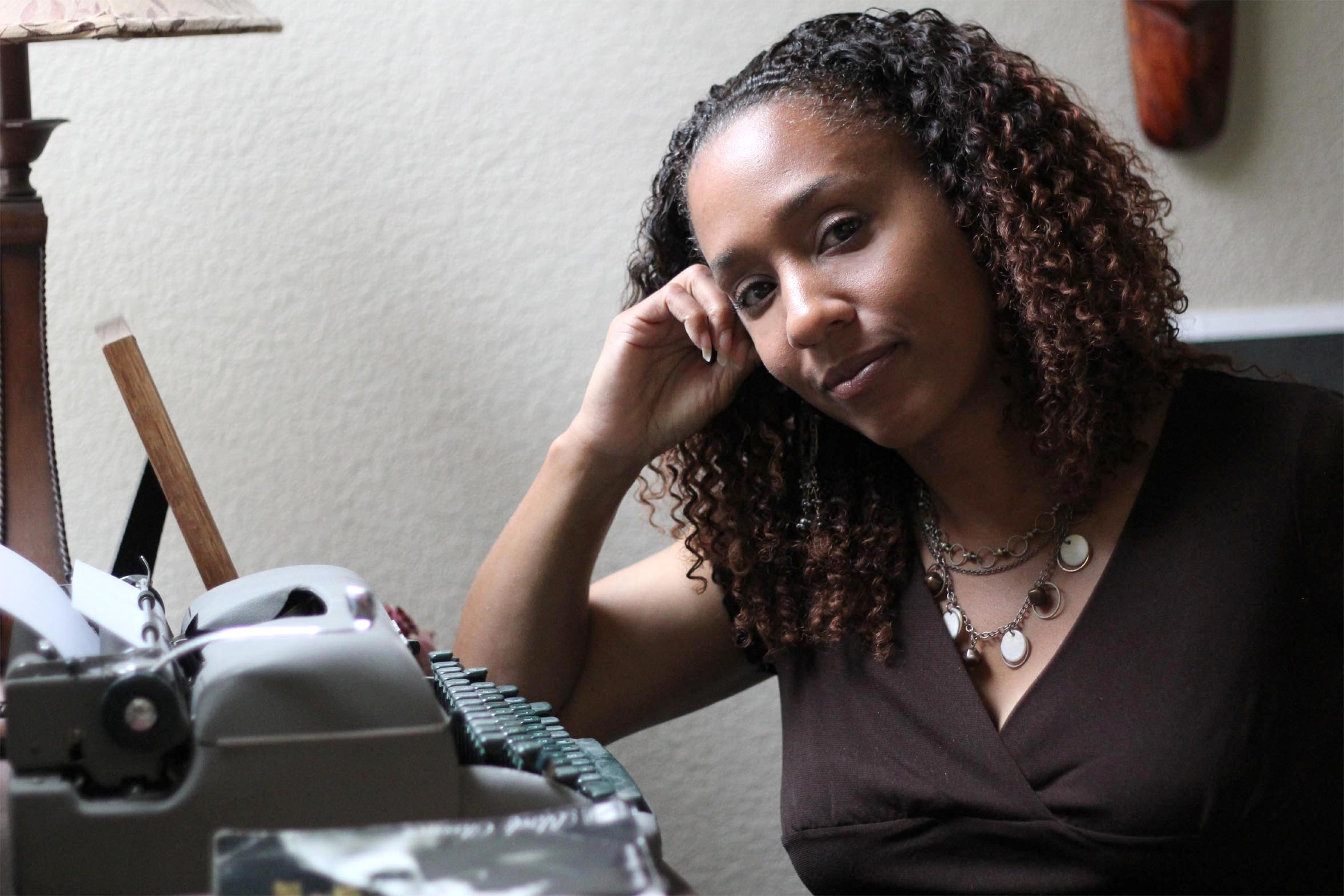
O'Neal in 2013

Terry Anne O'Neal (née Williams; born June 15, 1973) is an American writer and poet. O'Neal was named one of the 21st century's great Black women writers in a book entitled Literary Divas: The Top 100+ Most Admired African-American Women Writers in Literature (2006). Her name is sometimes stylized as Terry a O'Neal.

== Biography ==
O'Neal was born Terry Anne Williams in French Camp, California, and raised on the south side of Stockton, California, where she was exposed to arts, literature, and culture by her mother, Barbara Ann Tillman-Williams. As a child, she met Maya Angelou at the art gallery where her mother worked, an experience that she later said inspired her pursuit of writing.

In 1991, she graduated from Franklin High School in Stockton. The summer following her graduation, O'Neal married at 18-years-old, and went on to attend California State University, Sacramento in the fall of 1991.

Poetry had always been her first love in literature, largely inspired by her mother and her best-loved poets of the Harlem Renaissance: Langston Hughes, Carolyn M. Rodgers, and Gwendolyn Brooks, to name a few. While raising a family, attending grad school, O'Neal decided to turn to writing; and in 2000, she published her first book of poetry, Motion Sickness.

Shortly after her first book, O'Neal released her second collection of poetry The Poet Speaks In Black (2001) and the children's picture book Ev'ry Little Soul (2002).

One year later, she published Sweet Lavender (2003), a coming-of-age story of a young girl forced to grow up too fast after her father walked out of her life at a young age. The novel, that was inspired by the works of Langston Hughes and her passion for father-daughter stories, was later adapted into a feature screenplay.

In 2005, O'Neal founded Lend Your Hand, Educating the World's Children, a non-profit organization geared towards providing resources and schools supplies needed to help students achieve academic success. Through the non-profit, she developed and implemented The Black History Bee, a program designed to teach youth Black history through a trivia competition.

Apart from her own writings, O'Neal has toured secondary schools across the country to encourage young people. She edited and published the collection Make Some Noise! A Youth Poetry Anthology, a collection that featured poetry by youth aged 12 to 18 years.

Make Some Noise IV! A Baton Rouge Youth Poetry Anthology (2017) was dedicated to Louisiana youth. Through poetry, prose and short stories, they wrote about surviving the Louisiana great flood and police shootings of 2016.

O'Neal has worked with youth across the United States and abroad to foster literacy, storytelling, and creative expression through poetry. The poetry series is published through her independent publishing company, LeBleu Publications, formerly known as Motion Publishing (established in 1999). Make Some Noise VII: Lift Every Voice (2025), the latest volume, is by young writers from Hampton Roads, Virginia.

Beyond her literary and educational work, O'Neal has also been involved in historic preservation efforts. In 2026, she established the Chloe African American Preservation Association (CAACPA), a nonprofit organization that is dedicated to documenting and preserving the Chloe Historic Cemetery in Calcasieu Parish, Louisiana. Through the organization, volunteers and descendants are continuously working to restore the histories of those buried there, which date back to slavery.

== Filmmaking ==
With the support of television writer, Stacee Comage, and O'Neal's script editor, J. Kenneth Rotcop, O'Neal adapted Sweet Lavender into a full-length feature screenplay. The following year, O'Neal launched the independent film studio, Motion Productions, bearing the same name as her book publishing company.

In 2009, O'Neal came across the case of missing person Maurice Laron Jefferson, also known as "Red", who disappeared after leaving his grandparents' home on his way to basketball practice in Fort Lauderdale, Florida, in 1983. O'Neal felt compelled to write to his mother, Bettye Bridges, to say that her son's picture "called out to me for some sort of peace and understanding". O'Neal worked on a documentary about him, Hope of Finding a Son: The Maurice "Red" Jefferson Story.

In 2012, she returned to her screenplay Sweet Lavender, finally moving into production under the title Along the Dirt Road. The film, set in Breaux Bridge, LA, was to be shot in towns within Calcasieu Parish where her mother grew up. Alpharetta teen actress and singer, Camryn Levert, who was 15 at the time, was cast as lead character, Rae Lynne, in the film. Production was halted in the summer of 2014.

== Poetry ==
Although O'Neal is best known for her young adult fiction novel, she is also a poet as a result of interest in Harlem Renaissance poets while young. American historian and state librarian of California, Dr. Kevin Starr, dommented: "Her poems are reflective of African American culture and at the same time underscore our universal humanity."

O'Neal credits her mother, also a poet, who introduced her to poetry in her early childhood. A 2022 article in Inside Sacramento Magazine noted:

"I credit my mother for everything," says O'Neal, raised in Stockton by her mother, Barbara Ann Tillman-Williams, a native of Louisiana who moved to California in the 1970s but reared O'Neal and her three siblings as if they were still in the south. "My mother was a seamstress, a chef, a poet, she could draw—she was an all-encompassing creative person, so how could I not be? She was always encouraging, always inspiring me to be a better me. The great I am is because of her."

After her divorce, O'Neal released a book of poetry titled The Sparrow's Plight: Woes of a 21st Century Black Poet (2014). In the book, the author speaks of her run-ins with life being a Black, liberated woman in a White America, racial injustice, and the tragedies unfolding around the world. In the foreword by author and literary critic, Rudolph Lewis, he pointed out:

Neither Gil Scott-Heron nor Richard Wright could have written as poetically with such depth and beauty as Terry a O'Neal does with regard to two recent issues, namely, the tragedies of Fukishima and African child soldiers. I can imagine some poet might have been quite graphic when it comes to the inhumane wreckage caused by the tsunami and earthquake in northern Japan and the meltdown of six nuclear reactors. But in the nine line poem "disaster zone," O'Neal captures the horror in words of wondrous awe.

== Personal life ==
Terry A. O'Neal was born Terry Anne Williams to mother, Barbara Ann Tillman, from Calcasieu Parish, Louisiana, and Henry L. Williams of Tyler, TX.

By 1992, aged 18, O'Neal was an undergraduate student, a wife and mother. For 28 years, O'Neal lived in Elk Grove, California, with her now ex-husband, Michael O'Neal, and their three children. The couple divorced in 2018.

She relocated to Hampton, Virginia in 2021, and remarried the following year to former news journalist, filmmaker, and screenwriter, Kurt David Hogan. The griot couple were united by a shared passion for the arts.

When the economy reopened following the Covid-19 pandemic, the husband-and-wife duo resumed their creative endeavors, working as story producers and script writers on season two of the docuseries Home Sweet Home Hampton Roads, where Hogan also served as director and producer. The show aired Sunday mornings on WVEC (channel 13), an affiliate of ABC in Hampton Roads, Virginia.

== Works ==
- Motion Sickness (2000) ISBN 9780967944609
- The Poet Speaks in Black (2001) ISBN 9780967944647
- Ev'ry Little Soul (2002) ISBN 9780967944661
- Sweet Lavender (2003) ISBN 9780967944678
- Good Mornin' Glory (2006) ISBN 9780976849223
- The Sparrow's Plight: Woes of a 21st Century Black Poet (2014) ISBN 9780976849247
- He: a collection of original poetry (2017) ISBN 9780967944623
- Sepia Modernism: Poetry Without Resolution (2026) ISBN 9780976849216
