= Terry Peirce =

Personal information
- Full name: Terence Sydney Peirce
- Born: 7 September 1930; Latrobe, Tasmania
- Died: 31 March 1984 (aged 53); Devonport, Tasmania
- Original team: Latrobe
- Height: 175 cm (5 ft 9 in)
- Weight: 76 kg (168 lb)

Playing career^{1}
Years	Club	Games (Goals)
1951–52	Melbourne	3 (0)
- ^{1} Playing statistics correct to the end of 1952.

Terence Sydney Peirce (7 September 1930 – 31 March 1984) was an Australian rules footballer who played with Melbourne in the Victorian Football League (VFL).
