= Terry Winter Owens =

American composer and educator (1941-2007)

Terry Winter Owens (1941 – 31 July 2007) was an American composer and music educator.

== Biography ==
Terry Winter Owens was born in New York City, and began composing at age ten. She took music lessons as a child and won a scholarship to study with Lisa Szylagi Grad. Later she studied composition with Ralph Shapey and Mark Brunswick and earned a B.A. in music from The City College of New York. She continued her studies at New York University.

Owens performed as a violinist, pianist and harpsichordist with orchestras and chamber ensembles, serving as musical director for the Staten Island Baroque Ensemble. She was employed as pianist for the Richmond Opera Collection and played first violin in La Puma Opera Company Orchestra. She also worked as a free-lance music editor and pioneered in the use of music editing software. Owens taught music and composition privately, and also at the Neighborhood Music School of New York, and the Music Institute of Staten Island.

Owens collaborated with filmmaker Douglas Morse on the film The Lost Children of Coney Island through a grant from The American Composers Forum. She also composed the film score for The Clearing which was selected from over 300 entries for the 1994 New York Expo. Owens' music has been performed in New York City, Dubai, Turkey, Spain, Portugal, the Netherlands and Tokyo.

== Awards ==
- Yamaha Artist
- Nominated for the Van Cliburn Commission 2005
- First Prize in the Miriam Gideon Competition for chamber work
- Finalist in the Whitney Museum Two Piano Festival

== Works ==
Selected works include:

- Ancient Fire for two pianos
- Cellestial Music: Book I: The Facts of Light for cello and narrator
- Messages for Raoul Wallenberg
- Rendezvous with Hyakutake
- Supernova
- Pianophoria #3
- Lay Your Shadow on the Sundials
