= Terry (surname) =

Terry is a surname which comes from the medieval Norman given name Thierry, cognate of the English Derek. Notable people with the surname include:

- Adam Terry (born 1982), American football player
- Alberto Terry (1929–2006), Peruvian footballer
- Alfred Terry (1827–1890), American Civil War Union general
- Alice Terry (1899–1987), American film actress and director
- Arthur Terry (1927–2004), English philologist, critic, and translator
- Ben Terry (1852–1910), Test cricket umpire
- Benjamin Franklin Terry (1821–1861), organizer of the American Civil War unit Terry's Texas Rangers
- Bill Terry (disambiguation), several people
- Charles L. Terry, Jr. (1900–1970), American judge and politician, Governor of Delaware
- Charles Sanford Terry (historian) (1864–1936), English historian and musicologist
- Charles Sanford Terry (translator) (1926–1982), American translator of Japanese literature
- Chris Terry, several people
- Clark Terry (1920–2015), jazz fluegelhorn/trumpet player and music educator
- Dalen Terry (born 2002), American basketball player
- Daniel Terry (c. 1780–1829), English actor and playwright
- David Smith Terry (1823–1889), American politician and jurist, chief justice of the Supreme Court of California
- Dennis Terry (born 1954), American radio disc jockey and former phone phreak
- Desean Terry, American actor, acting coach and theatre director
- Edward Terry (author) (1590–1660), cleric and author of A Voyage to East-India (1655)
- Edward O'Connor Terry (1844–1912), 19th-century English actor and theatre owner
- Edward Richard "Ted" Terry (1904–1967), Tasmanian professional sprinter and Australian rules footballer
- Eli Terry (1772–1852), American inventor and clockmaker
- Elizabeth Terry (born c. 1943), American chef
- Dame Ellen Terry (1847–1928), English actress
- Fred Terry (1863–1933), English actor and theatre manager
- Georgena Terry, American bicycle designer and businesswoman
- Georgina Terry (born 1990), British actress
- Harry Terry (born 1887, date of death unknown), English stage and film actor
- Helen Terry (born 1956), backing vocals singer with British pop group Culture Club
- Henry Dwight Terry (1812–1869), United States Army Brigadier general during the American Civil War
- Henry John Terry (1869–1952), cricketer who played for the French team in the 1900 Olympics
- J. E. Harold Terry (1885–1939), English playwright
- Jack Terry (1930–2022), Polish-American author
- James Terry (basketball) (born 1960), American-Israeli basketball player
- James L. Terry (born 1957), US Army Lieutenant General
- Jason Terry (born 1977), American basketball player
- Jermaine Terry II (born 2003), American football player
- Jo Ann Terry (born 1938), American hurdler
- John B. Terry (1796–1874), American pioneer, soldier, and territorial legislator
- John Terry (born 1980), English football player
- Joseph Terry (1828–1898), partner in Terry's chocolate makers (1767–2006)
- Keith Terry (born 1951), American percussionist, rhythm dancer, and educator
- Kelly Terry (born 1992), Canadian former women's ice hockey player
- Lilian Terry (1930–2023), Italian jazz singer
- Luther Leonidas Terry (1911–1985), U.S. Surgeon General (1961–65)
- Matt Terry (born 1993), English singer, winner of UK X Factor (2016)
- Maureen Terry, American business owner and politician
- Michael Terry (disambiguation), several people
- Michelle Terry (born 1979), English actress and writer
- Mike Terry (disambiguation), several people
- Nigel Terry (1945–2015), English actor
- Olufemi Terry, Sierra Leonean writer
- P. S. Terry (1876–1936), American politician, Missouri senator
- Parnell Terry, American politician, Maine state legislator
- Pat Terry (1933–2007), English footballer
- Paul Terry (cricketer) (born 1959), English cricketer
- Paul Terry (footballer) (born 1979), English footballer and brother of John
- Paul Terry (cartoonist) (1887–1971), U.S. cartoonist and animator, and creator of Terrytoons
- Peter Terry (1926–2017), British air marshal
- Ralph Terry (1936–2022), American major league baseball pitcher
- Randall Terry (born 1959), American politician and activist
- Richard Terry (musicologist) (1864–1938), English organist, choir director and musicologist
- Rob Terry (born 1980), American professional wrestler
- Rodney Terry (born 1968), American basketball coach
- Ruth Marie Terry (1936–1974), American murder victim
- Ruth Terry (1920–2016), American actress
- Samuel Terry (c. 1776–1838), Australian landowner, merchant and philanthropist
- Sean Terry (born 1991), English cricketer
- Sheila Terry (disambiguation), several people
- Simon Terry (1974–2021), British archer
- Siobhan Terry (born 2000), New Zealand para-cyclist
- Sue Mi Terry, American writer and commentator
- Tamorrion Terry (born 1998), American football player
- Tarahrick Terry, American criminal
- Todd Terry (born 1967), American DJ, record producer and remixer
- Tomás Terry (died 1886), Cuban slave trader and businessman
- Troy Terry (born 1997), American ice hockey player
- Tyrell Terry (born 2000), American basketball player
- T. T. Terry (1865–1941), American politician; mayor of Huntsville, Alabama
- Victor Terry (1942–1960), English murderer
- Wallace Terry (1938–2003), American journalist and oral historian
- Wallace Terry (baseball) (1850–1908), American baseball player
- Walter Terry (1909–1977), American politician
- William Terry (congressman) (1824–1888), American general
- William R. Terry (1827–1897), American general

== See also ==
- Terry (given name)
- Terry (disambiguation)
