= Terry (disambiguation) =

Terry is a common given name. It is also a surname: see Terry (surname).

Terry may also refer to:

== Places in the United States ==
- Terry Township, Finney County, Kansas
- Terry, Louisiana, an unincorporated community
- Terry, Mississippi, a town
- Terry, Pemiscot County, Missouri
- Terry, Montana, a town
- Fort Terry, Plum Island, New York, a former coastal fortification
- Terry Peak, South Dakota, a mountain and ski area
- Terry, South Dakota, an unincorporated community
- Terry County, Texas
- Terry, West Virginia, an unincorporated community

== Arts and entertainment ==
- Terry (book), a pictorial biography on Canadian activist Terry Fox
- Terry (film), a biographical film on Canadian activist Terry Fox
- "Terry" (Twinkle song), 1964
- "Terry" (Kirsty MacColl song)
- Terry (dog), the dog who played Toto in The Wizard of Oz
- Terryana Fatiah, an Indonesian singer whose stage name is Terry
- Takeshi Terauchi, a Japanese guitarist going by the stage name Terry

== Other uses ==
- Terry v. Ohio, a United States Supreme Court decision regarding search and seizure
- USS Terry, two United States Navy destroyers
- Terry's, chocolate manufacturers of York, England (1767–2005)
- Terry Collection, a collection of human skeletons held by the Department of Anthropology of the National Museum of Natural History, Washington, D.C.
- The Terry College of Business, part of the University of Georgia
- Terry cloth or terry towelling, absorbent cloth used to make towels and bathrobes
- Tropical Storm Terry, tropical cyclones named Terry

== See also ==
- Justice Terry (disambiguation)
- Teri (disambiguation)
- Terri
- Terrie
- Tery
- Terry-Thomas (1911–1990), English comedian and actor
