= Teri (disambiguation) =

Teri is a given name.

Teri may also refer to:

- Teri, Khyber Pakhtunkhwa, a village and Union Council in Karak District, Pakistan
- Teri, Leh, a village in India
- Teries, people from Hawick, Scotland
- The Energy and Resources Institute (TERI), an Indian research institute
- TERI University, India
- Teri (geology), a coastal dune complex in southeastern India

== See also ==
- Terri
- Terry (disambiguation)
- Teresa (disambiguation)
