= Irere (collection) =

2003 fashion collection by Alexander McQueen

The oyster dress, a beige chiffon gown whose skirt resembles an oyster shell, as displayed during the exhibition Alexander McQueen: Savage Beauty (2011)

Irere is the twenty-first collection by British fashion designer Alexander McQueen, released for the Spring/Summer 2003 season of his eponymous fashion house. Irere was inspired by imagery from the Age of Discovery and from the people and animals of the Amazon rainforest. Its title is claimed to mean 'transformation' in an unspecified Indigenous Amazonian language. The collection comprised three distinct concepts presented as a narrative sequence: shipwrecked pirates, menacing conquistadors, and tropical birds. McQueen described the collection as an effort to present a more mature point of view and surprise viewers with bold colours.

The collection's runway show was staged on 5 October 2002 during Paris Fashion Week. The models walked around a bare white stage with a large screen for a backdrop. A film by John Maybury accompanied the show, depicting the phases of the collection's narrative. Fifty-six looks were presented. The most significant were the "shipwreck dress", worn by a model in the Maybury film, and the "oyster dress", a technically complex gown with a skirt made from hundreds of individual circles of organza, resembling an oyster shell. A skull-printed scarf presented in Irere became a trend and then a brand signature.

Response to the collection was positive, especially towards the oyster dress, which critics regarded as evidence of McQueen's evolving skills as a designer. Although some reviewers criticised the show's narrative, most felt that the colourful dresses of the third act were a strong finale. Many in the industry named Irere as one of their favourites for the season. Ensembles from Irere appeared in several magazine spreads following the show. Various museums hold items from the collection, some of which have appeared in exhibitions like the retrospective Alexander McQueen: Savage Beauty.

== Background ==
British designer Alexander McQueen was known in the fashion industry for his imaginative, sometimes controversial designs, and fashion shows which were theatrical to the point of verging on performance art. Over the course of his career, which lasted from 1992 until his death in 2010, he explored a broad range of ideas and themes, particularly sexuality, death, violence, romanticism, and historicism. In 2000, McQueen sold 51 per cent of his company to Italian fashion house Gucci but retained creative control. Although he worked in ready-to-wear – clothing produced for retail sale – his showpiece designs featured a degree of craftsmanship that verged on haute couture.

McQueen's personal fixations had a strong influence on his designs, especially his love of the natural world, which he referenced visually and by incorporating natural materials. McQueen felt an affinity for water and the ocean: he enjoyed swimming and diving and, later in life, owned a house by the sea. This love was reflected in his career from its earliest stages. The runway shows for early collections such as Bellmer La Poupée (Spring/Summer 1997) and Untitled (Spring/Summer 1998) included water features, and the advertising campaign for Supercalifragilisticexpialidocious (Autumn/Winter 2002) depicted a model suspended in a water-filled vessel. A love of film influenced many of his collections.

McQueen's career roughly paralleled that of fellow British designer John Galliano, who preceded him in the industry by about a decade. The men had each graduated from Central Saint Martins art school in London: Galliano in 1984 and McQueen in 1992. Both had started their careers as independent designers before being hired by famous French fashion houses in the mid-1990s; McQueen had replaced Galliano at Givenchy when Galliano went to Dior. (Note: From October 1996 to October 2001, McQueen was simultaneously head designer at Givenchy and at his own label.) Their designs and shows were similarly creative and theatrical. During the period in which their careers overlapped, fashion journalists compared and contrasted their work and career choices, and they have sometimes been referred to as rivals. McQueen, who had a competitive streak, resented being compared to Galliano and often sought to emulate or outdo Galliano's ideas in his own work.

== Concept and creative process ==
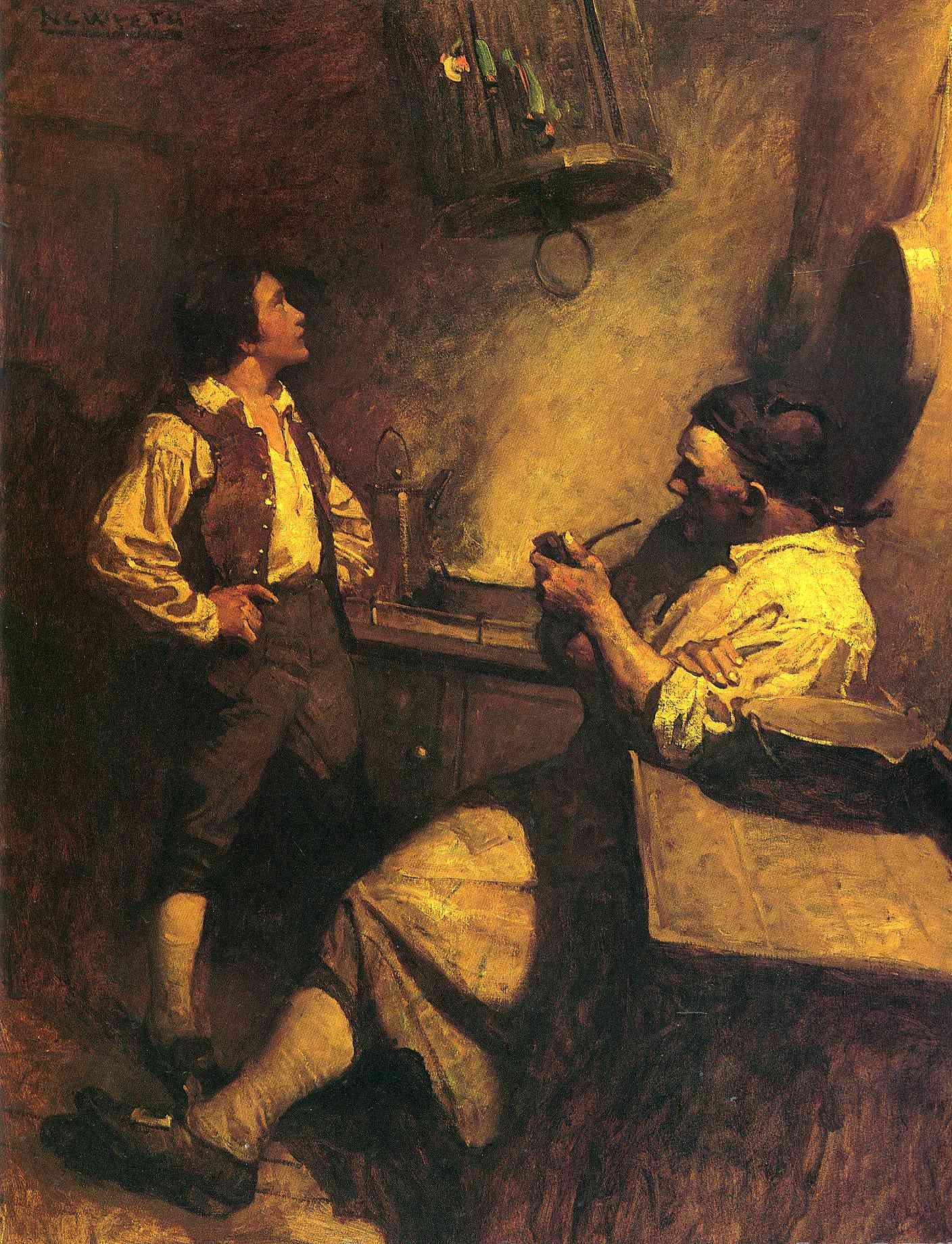
Pirate characters from Treasure Island (1911 ed.), painted by N. C. Wyeth

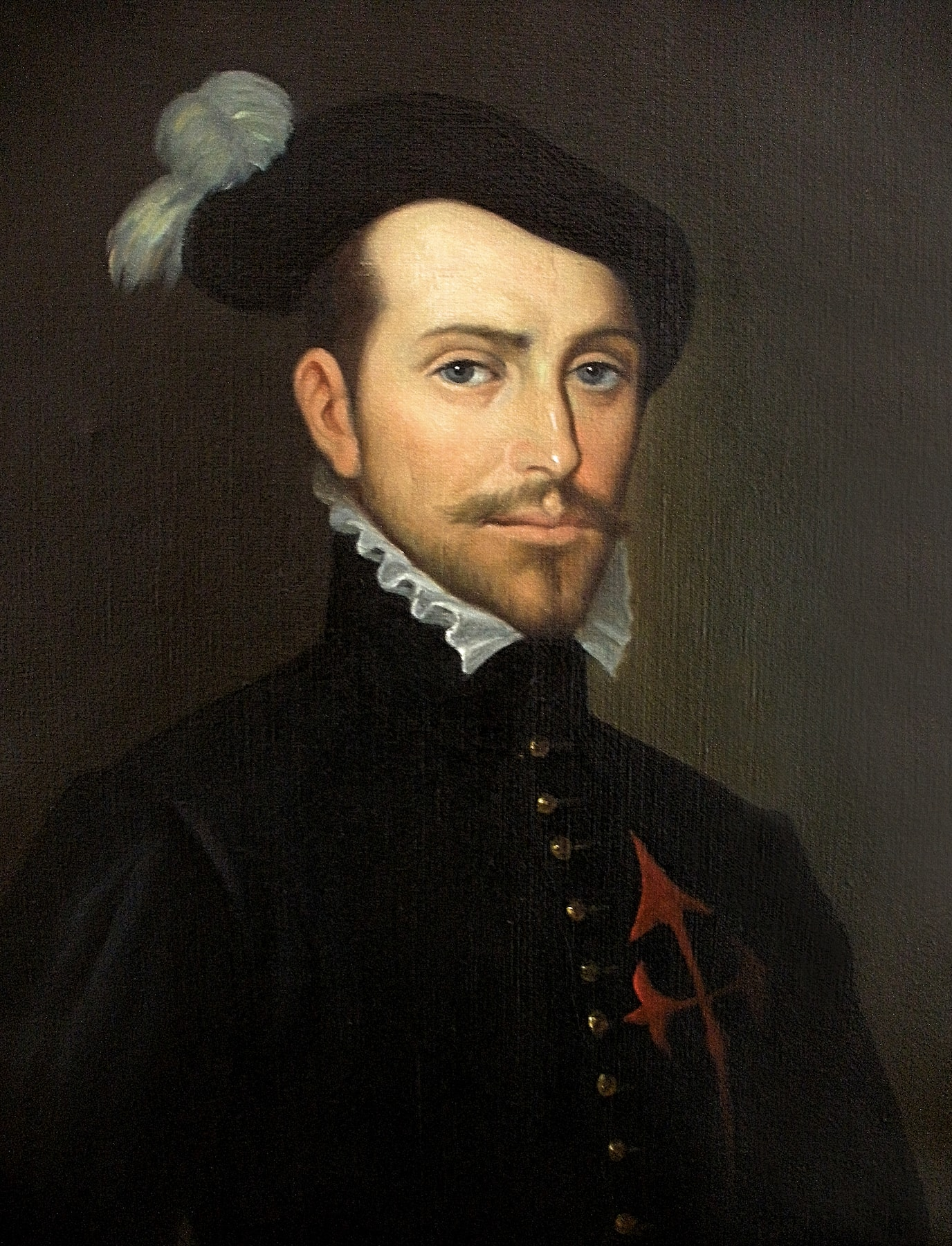
17th century portrait of conquistador Hernán Cortés (1485–1547)

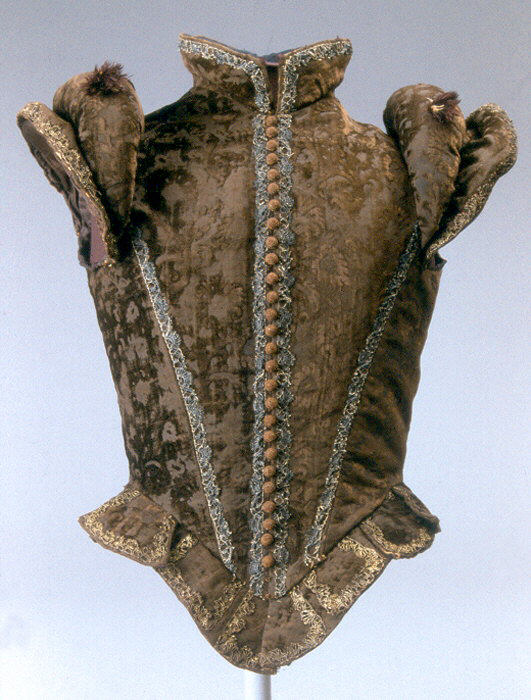
Jerkin of silk and metallic thread, made 1570–1580

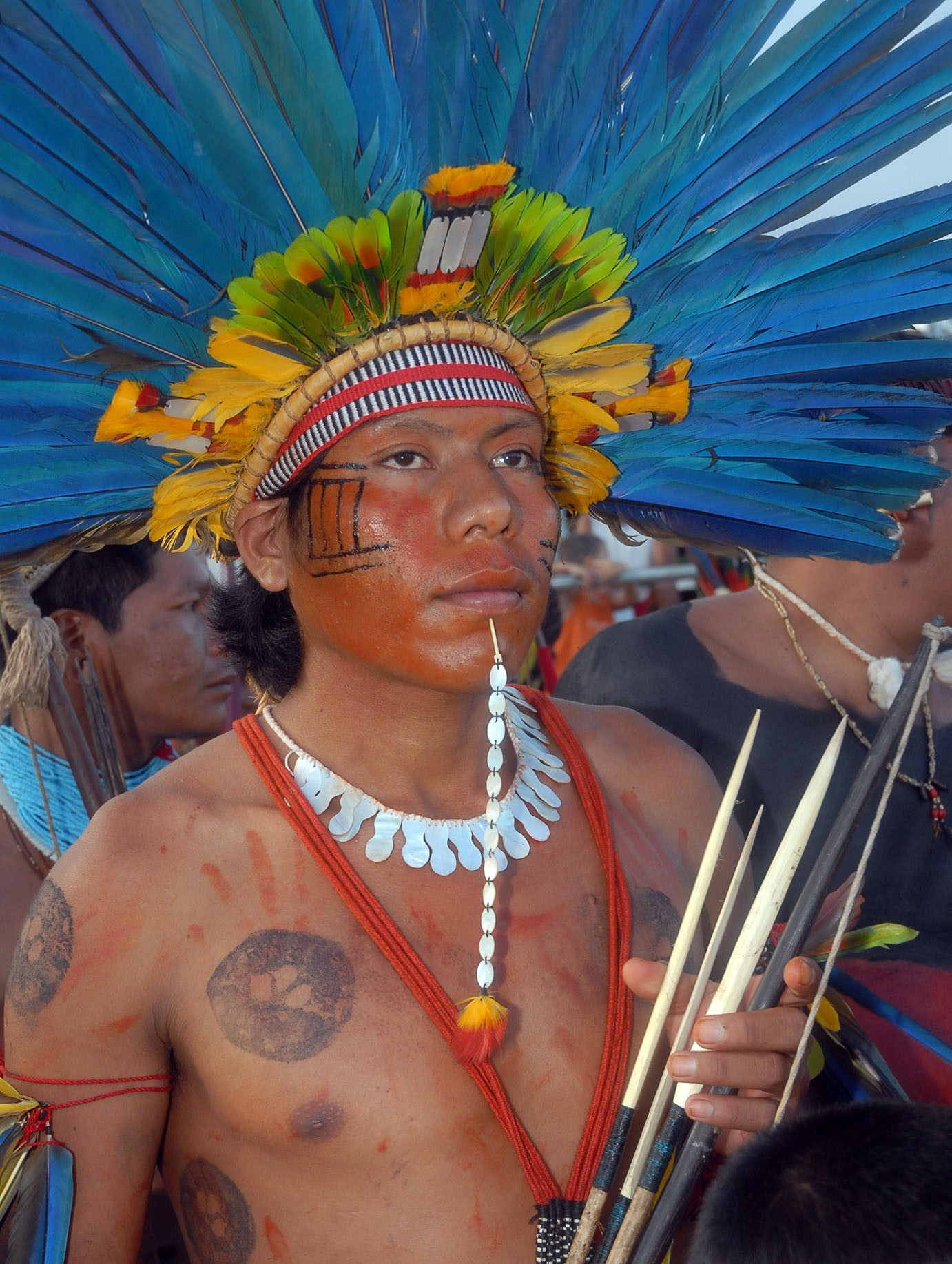
Modern Bororo youth wearing a traditional feathered headdress

Irere (Spring/Summer 2003) was the twenty-first collection McQueen designed for his eponymous fashion house. The collection comprised three distinct concepts presented as a narrative sequence. McQueen had used a three-act structure in previous shows, permitting exploration of multiple variations on a theme. For Irere, McQueen designed the final phase first, then worked backwards through the middle and first phases.

The first two phases were inspired by the explorers, pirates, and conquistadors of the Age of Discovery. The final phase drew on the culture and garb of the Indigenous peoples of the Amazon and the colourful plumage of tropical birds like macaws. In depicting the conflict which occurred when European explorers encountered the Amazon, it was significantly influenced by The Mission, a 1986 period film by Roland Joffé, in which a Spanish Jesuit tries to protect a Paraguayan indigenous tribe from conquest and slavery. Curator Andrew Bolton suggested that the phases represented the timeline of the colonization of South America. The word "irere" is usually claimed to mean "transformation" in an unspecified Indigenous Amazonian language, although Judith Watt claims that it is an Amerindian word referring to the white-faced whistling duck.

As was typical for McQueen, the collection had a strong historicist tendency, with elements of Elizabethan and Victorian fashion incorporated throughout. Some reviewers noted possible influence from the William Shakespeare plays Twelfth Night and The Tempest, both of which concern the survivors of shipwrecks. McQueen described the collection as an effort to show a more mature and romantic side. He sought to surprise viewers with bold colours, which he had previously avoided. He told Women's Wear Daily: "With all the terrorist incidents and talk of war, I was trying to be more politically correct for the times."

The first phase of the collection suggested the garb of shipwrecked pirates or buccaneers. The outfits featured ruffled tops, leather layered over chiffon, and Elizabethan fashion elements including corsets and jerkins. There were also loose trousers in linen. Lace and chiffon elements were distressed to accentuate the shipwrecked look. Finally, many outfits were finished with knee-high brown leather pirate boots.

The second phase included outfits with similar silhouettes and materials to the first phase except rendered entirely in black. Many items featured snakeskin or precise laser cut-outs. Watt interpreted this section as referring to the Spanish and Portuguese conquistadors who invaded South America in the 15th and 16th centuries. Some reviewers found these items reminiscent of Christian clerical garments, while Joelle Diderich of The Courier-Mail found a resemblance to the costumes of 18th century highwaymen and modern outlaw bikers.

The final section featured jumpsuits and long chiffon dresses in bright colours echoing the plumage of tropical birds, with some outfits featuring actual feathers. Other dresses featured feather prints commissioned from designer Jonathan Saunders. McQueen said that one print, which took five months to develop, used twenty-six colours; the dress it was used for retailed for US$15,000. Kristin Knox wrote that Look 56, which combined a historical-style ruffed jacket with a modern tie-dye skirt, contrasted the masculine jacket with the feminine skirt in a way which "updates and de-contextualizes McQueen's penchant for historical tailoring". Several outfits featured shoes with transparent block heels which had butterflies inside.

== Runway show ==
=== Staging and design ===
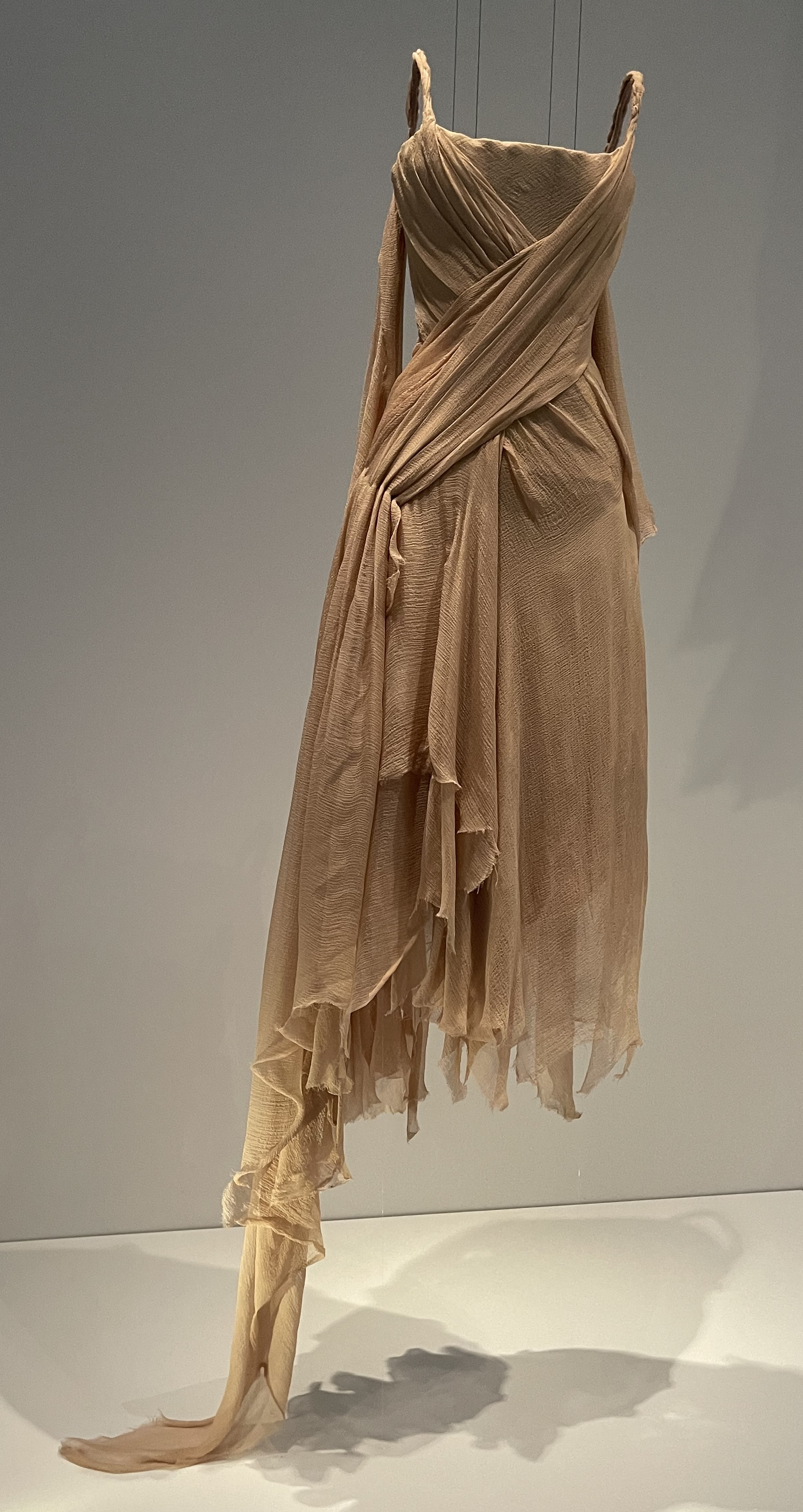
The shipwreck dress as presented at the exhibition Lee Alexander McQueen: Mind, Mythos, Muse (2023 staging)

The runway show for Irere was staged on 5 October 2002 during Paris Fashion Week, at the Grande halle de la Villette. The invite was a flipbook which depicted the face of a model transitioning gradually into that of an Indigenous Amazonian boy. Attendance was unusually high for a fashion show – there were 2,500 guests – and the seating extended up into the rafters to accommodate them all. The models walked around a bare white square said to be the size of a basketball court, with a 15 by 6 m (50 by 20 ft) screen for a backdrop. As usual for McQueen, headwear for the show was provided by milliner Philip Treacy and jewellery by Shaun Leane. Val Garland styled makeup and Guido Palau was responsible for hair. Joseph Bennett returned to handle set design.

The show's soundtrack comprised what author Katharine Gleason described as "wailing and tribal music" in the first phase. In the second, tracks included covers of "Son of a Preacher Man" and "The Jean Genie". Sound design for the third phase included percussion music and bird calls.

=== Show ===
A short film by John Maybury played during the show, depicting the phases of the collection's narrative. A young woman wearing what became known as the "shipwreck dress" swims to a tropical shore after a shipwreck. In the jungle, she evades pursuers dressed in black with glowing green eyes – conquistadors, or perhaps malevolent sprites. The final segment is presented in colourful thermal imaging: transformed by nature, the girl escapes to live among the area's indigenous people. According to Maybury, McQueen was on-set during filming, "acting as co-director and art director". Curator Susanna Brown connected the first portion of Maybury's film to underwater photographs taken by Toni Frissell in the late 1940s. She argued that Frissell's photos and Maybury's film were visually framed to make it unclear whether the women were sinking or rising.

A total of fifty-six looks were presented during the runway show. The first portion of the show comprised twenty outfits. Models were styled with smeared makeup and wet hair in accordance with the shipwreck concept. Look 14 was a frock coat with a koi fish design based on a tattoo McQueen had. The oyster dress appeared during this phase, as did the shipwreck dress worn in the opening film, as Looks 18 and 20, respectively. The second phase comprised eighteen outfits. Models had beehive hairstyles with black eye makeup reminiscent of domino masks. Look 28 featured oversized earrings made from porcupine quills, which, unusually, sat on the rim of the ear, with the quills fanned out around it. The most significant ensemble from this section was Look 32, which featured Karen Elson in a nude bodysuit covered in black glass beads in stylised designs, paired with a silver disc held in the mouth that effectively bisected her face. The third section comprised eighteen outfits. Looks 44 and 53 featured large feathered headpieces inspired by Indigenous featherwork. Look 49 was another iteration of the oyster dress, with a red bodice and the ruffled skirt in rainbow. At the end of the show, the models appeared en masse for a final turn, along with McQueen, who wore a white suit for his bow.

=== Significant ensembles ===
He wanted this idea of it—was almost like she drowned—and the top part of the dress is all fine boning and tulle, and the chiffon is all frayed and disheveled on the top. The skirt is made out of hundreds and hundreds of circles of organza. Then, with a pen, what Lee did was he drew organic lines. And then all these circles were cut, joined together, and then applied in these lines along the skirt. So you created this organic, oyster-like effect.

— Sarah Burton

The most significant design from Irere is the oyster dress, a reinterpretation of a 1987 design by John Galliano called the "shellfish dress", which McQueen had long admired and sought to emulate. McQueen's design is a one-shouldered dress in bias-cut beige silk chiffon with a boned upper body and a full-length skirt. Hundreds of individual circles of organza were sewn to a bias-cut base dress in dense layers, resembling an oyster shell or a mille-feuille pastry. The original beige gown appeared in the Irere runway show as Look 18, worn by Leticia Birkheuer. The version with the skirt in rainbow appeared as Look 49, worn by Michelle Alves. The oyster dress is considered an iconic McQueen design, surpassing even the famed Galliano dress. McQueen returned to the concept several times throughout his career.

Look 20, the shipwreck dress, appeared in the Maybury film and was worn by Adina Fohlin in the show's pirate phase. Fashion scholar Harold Koda regarded the shipwreck dress as a reference to the himation, a wrapped garment from ancient Greece. He argued that the styling, with the fabric draped across the torso and the shredded skirt, makes the wearer appear to be in a state of "victorious emergence from a battle at sea", resembling the goddess Nike. Critic Herbert Muschamp viewed the shipwreck dress during a museum exhibition and wrote that its tattered state suggested that McQueen was making an analogy between urban life and rough weather. It reminded him of the death of dancer Isadora Duncan, who died when her long scarf became tangled in her car's wheels, breaking her neck. A New York Times review of the same exhibition found it was one of the more memorable dresses presented, managing to "convey the sense of sexual devastation that animated so much of Greek literature".

Author Kristin Knox suggested that Look 32, the beaded bodysuit, represented a reference to humanity's effect on the rainforest. For Katharine Gleason, the look transformed the model into several striking personas: "an ancient colonizer, a dark and mysterious bird, an alien visiting Earth from a distant galaxy". Bolton likened the pattern to the geometric designs that appear in the traditional art and tattooing of the Karajá people of Brazil.

== Reception ==
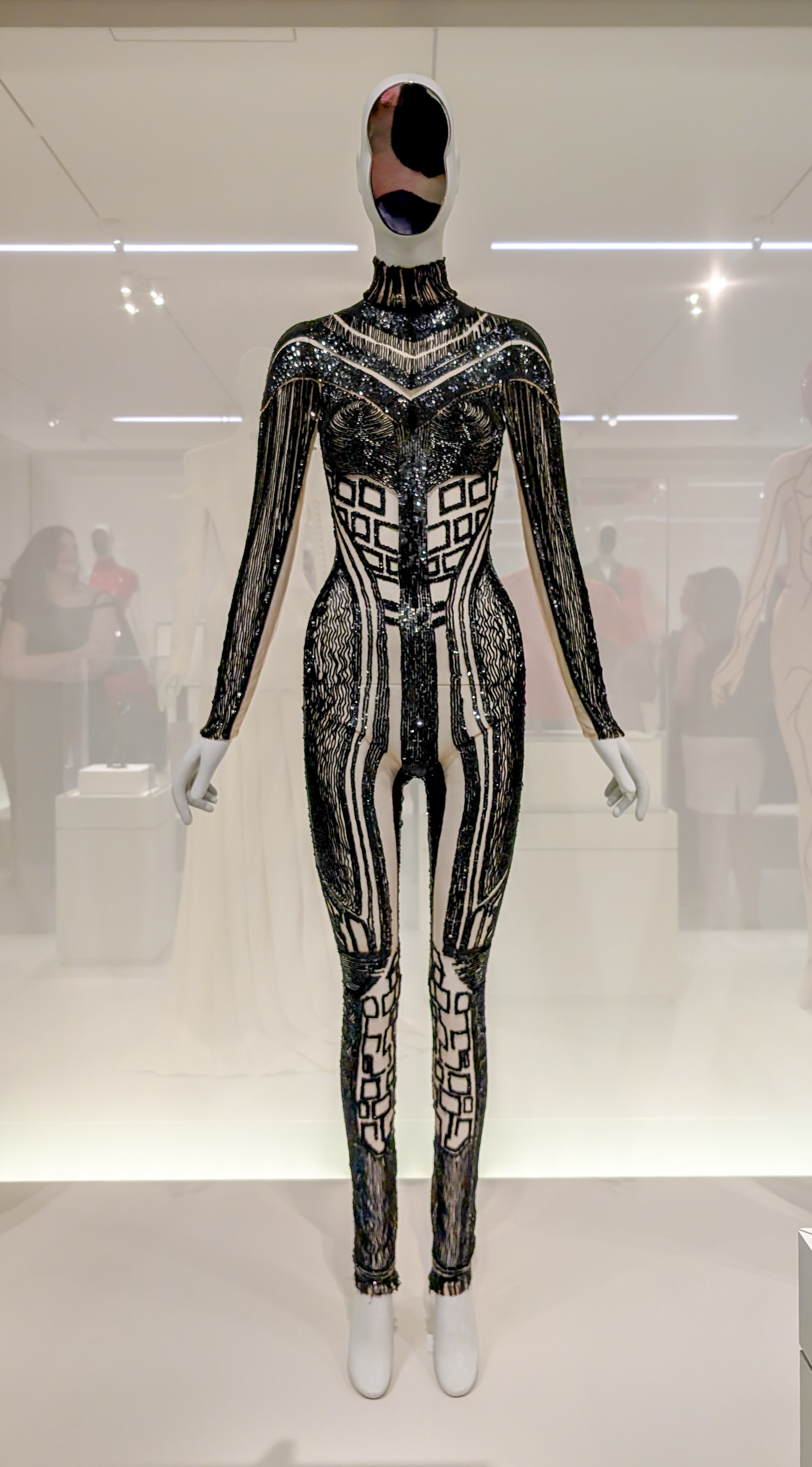
Bodysuit from Irere at Costume Art exhibition (2026)

Contemporary reception for Irere was positive, with many in the industry calling it one of the best collections for that season. Women's Wear Daily (WWD) called it the "hands-down favorite" for Spring/Summer 2003 and later named it one of their top dozen of the season. Buyers for major department stores including Neiman Marcus, Bloomingdale's, Bergdorf Goodman, and Hankyu all listed it as a favourite. The New York Times quoted fashion stylist Anne Christensen as saying "Alexander McQueen is the season's best designer because his clothes are beautiful and his silhouette original."

Reviewers generally agreed that the collection displayed McQueen's growing maturity as a designer, although some felt that this came at the expense of his famously theatrical runway presentations. Melissa Hoyer of Sydney's Sunday Telegraph felt that McQueen had "grown up and toned himself down" under Gucci and felt that many designs "seemed actually wearable". Sarah Mower, writing for Vogue, bemoaned the absence of McQueen's "famously macabre show tactics". Regardless of their feelings about the runway show, most critics were pleased with the actual clothing. The staff writer at WWD said the collection showed "a mind-boggling degree of creativity and work". Miles Socha, editor of WWD, wrote that "McQueen had Paris at his feet" with Irere.

Critics were somewhat divided about the collection's narrative. In The Daily Telegraph, Hilary Alexander called Irere a "voyage no less extraordinary" than that of the explorers who inspired it. Mower called it an "odd journey" with a "largely redundant" middle phase. The staff writer at WWD called the phases "seemingly unrelated" but wondered if the shipwreck and survival theme was a metaphor for McQueen's rocky journey through the fashion industry. They found that the size of the runway and the crowd made it difficult to appreciate the intricate details of the garments.

Many reviewers found the final phase the best of the three. Mower praised this phase for its brightly coloured dresses and jumpsuits, calling them "major showstoppers". Socha called this phase a "Technicolor blockbuster". For The Independent, Susannah Frankel wrote that in comparison to the "vivid" finale, a "bird of paradise would here be reduced to shrinking violet." Diderich wrote that "there was no mistaking McQueen's talent", calling out the rainbow oyster dress as a highlight. Hilary Alexander called the same dress "breathtaking". Cartner-Morley called the first two phases glorious but "familiar McQueen territory", finding the "joyous riot" of the third phase to be the best of the three. Stephen Todd of The Australian felt the finale displayed McQueen's "unique point of view" as a young outsider with macabre sensibilities.

The collection is viewed positively in retrospect. Chloe Fox of Vogue called it a "sartorial fable in which McQueen melded history, exoticism and nature". Maybury recalled that "each piece was sensational couture piece even though it was meant to be ready-to-wear". In The Little Book of Alexander McQueen, Karen Homer wrote that it was unusual for McQueen to follow trends, but it made the collection "all the more wearable for it".

== Analysis ==
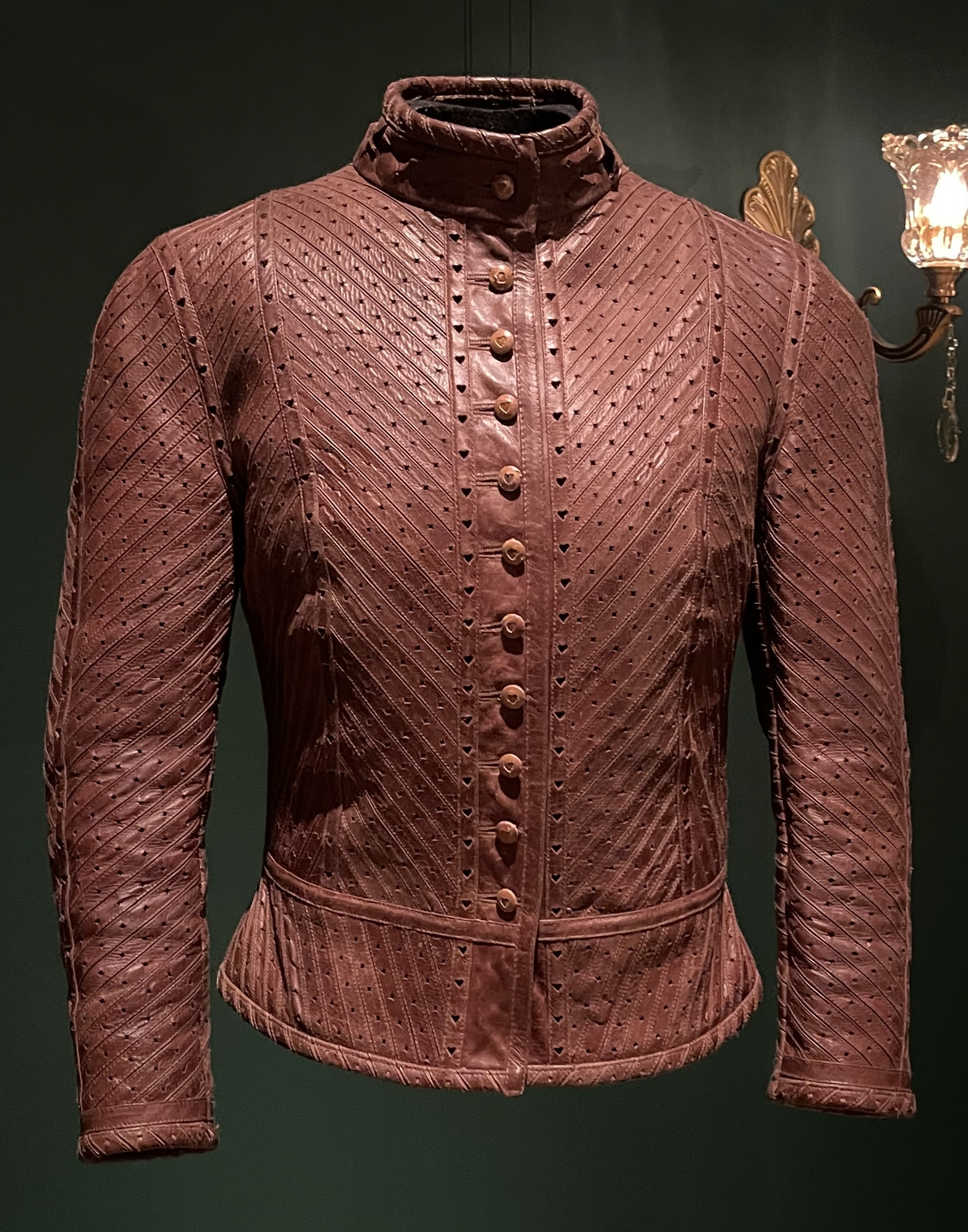
Leather jacket from the retail collection of Irere, at Mind, Mythos, Muse

Bright, tropical colours were a trend for the Spring/Summer 2003 season as a whole. Reviewer Stephen Todd noted this was a change from the muted tones of the previous few seasons, which he felt had represented a post-9/11 malaise. Judith Watt argued that other designers using bright colours that season were not "relying on ideas deep in their psyches", unlike McQueen, who she felt had "explore[d] an intimate side of his life" to create a very personal collection.

Fashion historian Alistair O'Neill cited Irere as an example of McQueen's interest in designing collections which demonstrated transformation in a narrative over time, like a film. Both Andrew Wilson and Watt summarised the theme as one of finding redemption through nature. In Watt's interpretation, the conquistadors of the second phase were "absorbed by the jungle" and transformed into the rainbow-wearing women of the final phase. Cathy Horyn of The New York Times wrote that "McQueen's brilliant stroke was to connect the past and present through the triumph of nature". According to one critic, the porcupine earrings may have been a hint at human–animal hybridisation, a theme McQueen touched on in several other collections including La Dame Bleue (Spring/Summer 2008) and The Horn of Plenty (Autumn/Winter 2009).

Researcher Lisa Skogh noted that McQueen often incorporated concepts and objects which might have appeared in a cabinet of curiosities – collections of natural and historical objects that were the precursor to modern museums. She described two examples in Irere. Shark teeth, used in the collection to decorate bracelets, were historically believed to be snake tongues which could detect poison. The feathers of tropical birds, which feature heavily in Irere both literally and as fabric prints, were popularly displayed in cabinets of curiosity.

== Legacy ==
=== Other media ===
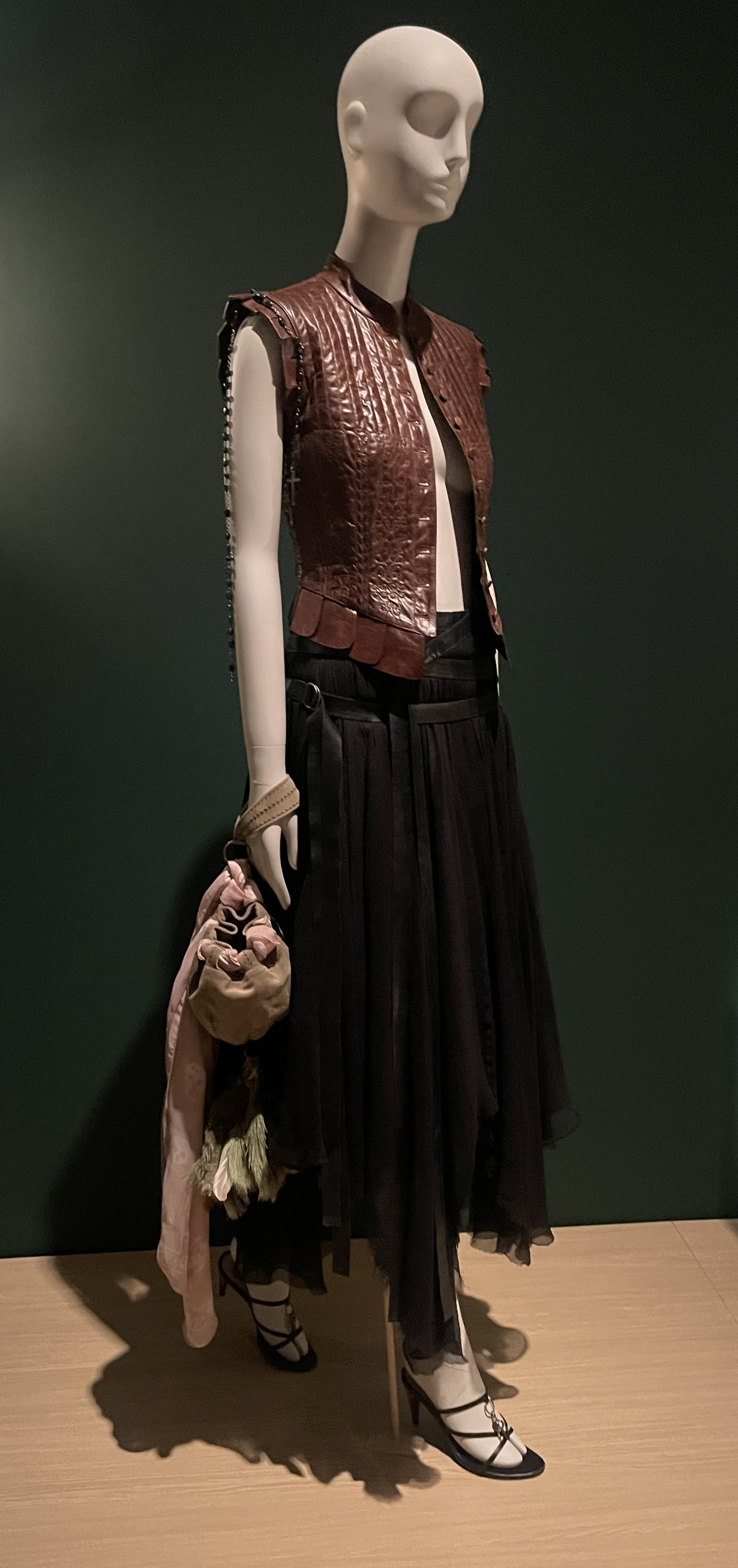
Ensemble from Irere presented at Mind, Mythos, Muse

The clothing from Irere made its way to several magazine spreads and covers. One of the colourful dresses from Irere appeared in Vogue, photographed by Regan Cameron; another appeared in Harper's Bazaar. Natalia Vodianova wore the original oyster dress for two photo shoots: Vogue in January 2003, photographed by Craig McDean, and Harper's Bazaar in March 2003, photographed by Peter Lindbergh. The rainbow oyster dress appeared on the cover of Vogue Italia for their Spring/Summer 2003 issue. Joy Bryant wore it for a photoshoot for InStyle magazine in March 2003, calling it the "Rainbow Cancan" dress.

American poet Terri Witek published a poem inspired by the shipwreck dress in the winter 2005 edition of The Hudson Review, republished as part of her 2008 collection The Shipwreck Dress.

=== Ownership and celebrity wear ===
Various items from Irere, especially the showpiece dresses, are owned by museums and celebrities. Only two copies of the beige oyster dress are known to exist. The Metropolitan Museum of Art (the Met) in New York City owns one, acquired in 2003. (Note: The catalogue produced for the original 2011 staging of Alexander McQueen: Savage Beauty says that all garments were lent by the Alexander McQueen archive unless otherwise noted. The oyster dress is not so noted, although The Met has owned their copy since 2003.) The Met also owns a copy of the shipwreck dress, acquired in 2014, and a pair of leather boots from Irere, acquired in 2008. The Los Angeles County Museum of Art (LACMA) owns several pieces from the collection, including a copy of the shipwreck dress and a variation of Look 24 from the show's middle phase. The National Gallery of Victoria (NGV) in Australia owns a black dress from the retail collection.

Media personality Kim Kardashian owns the other known oyster dress, purchased from Los Angeles vintage boutique Lily et Cie. She wore it to a 2020 Academy Awards afterparty hosted by Vanity Fair. Fashion theorist Naomi Braithwaite argued that by acquiring archival fashion items such as the oyster dress, Kardashian was attempting to integrate the cultural history of those objects into her own celebrity narrative, thereby increasing her own cultural significance by association.

Debra Messing wore the runway sample of the oyster dress to an awards show in 2002. Amal Clooney wore one of the red macaw printed dresses to the 2022 premiere of Ticket To Paradise; Emily Chan from Vogue deemed it one of her best archival fashion looks. Actress Maddie Ziegler wore a copy of the shipwreck dress for the red carpet of the 30th Screen Actors Guild Awards in February 2024, sourced from vintage fashion archive Shrimpton Couture. For the second act of her 2026 Eternal Sunshine Tour, Ariana Grande wore a custom pink Alexander McQueen fringed dress based on the shipwreck dress. Carlacia Grant wore a peach copy of the shipwreck dress to an event for her show Outer Banks in August 2026.

=== Exhibitions ===
The oyster and shipwreck dresses appeared in the Met's 2003 exhibition Goddess: The Classical Mode, and, with other clothing from Irere, in both stagings of the retrospective exhibition Alexander McQueen: Savage Beauty. Other items from Irere featured in Savage Beauty include a feathered headdress by Philip Treacy, jewellery by Shaun Leane, and a clip from Maybury's film. A selection of previously unpublished pencil sketches of designs for Irere were presented in Alexander McQueen, a book of essays published to accompany the second staging of Savage Beauty.

The LACMA's Irere items appeared in the 2022 exhibition Lee Alexander McQueen: Mind, Mythos, Muse, in which the shipwreck dress was displayed as an example of the kind of flowing, draped design McQueen had learned at Givenchy. Other items were displayed as examples of the collection's historicist bent: a leather top recalling a 16th-century doublet, a leather jacket resembling the slashed sleeves of the same period, and a denim ensemble with extensive lacing.

A rainbow-print dress owned by the The Museum at FIT appeared in their 2017 exhibition Force of Nature. A bodysuit from Irere, lent by McQueen's friend Daphne Guinness, appeared in the Met's 2026 exhibition Costume Art, where it was placed with a Karajá figurine.

=== Influence on later collections ===
Several elements from Irere reappeared in McQueen's later collections. The skull-print scarf worn in several ensembles, including Looks 11 and 17, was a best-seller that became a brand signature. Judith Watt identified the final four looks from In Memory of Elizabeth Howe, Salem, 1692 (Fall/Winter 2007), all featuring elaborate black patterning on nude backgrounds, as drawing on Look 32 from Irere. The feathered prints by Saunders reappeared in McQueen's Spring/Summer 2008 collection, La Dame Bleue. Kristin Knox considered Irere an early exploration of the impact of man on the natural world, a theme McQueen returned to in his final collections, including Natural Dis-tinction Un-natural Selection (Spring/Summer 2009). He revisited this theme in combination with a focus on a marine environment in his final fully-realised collection, Plato's Atlantis (Spring/Summer 2010), which envisioned a world in which humanity had returned to the ocean and evolved into an underwater form.

McQueen returned to the oyster dress concept several times. Actress Liv Tyler wore a variation of the oyster gown to the Paris premiere of The Lord of the Rings: The Two Towers in December 2002. Her version had a corset bodice and a pink skirt made from 250 metres (273 yd) of silk organza. He designed a wedding dress based on the oyster dress for the August 2004 wedding of his then-assistant Sarah Burton. Watt and Thomas both described several dresses from The Widows of Culloden (Autumn/Winter 2006) as evolutions of the oyster dress, including the dress worn in the illusion of Kate Moss that served as show's finale.

== Bibliography ==
- Bolton, Andrew (2011). Alexander McQueen: Savage Beauty. New York City: Metropolitan Museum of Art. ISBN 978-1-58839-412-5. OCLC 687693871.
- Bolton, Andrew (2026). Costume Art. New York City: Metropolitan Museum of Art. ISBN 978-1-58839-812-3. OCLC 1584588647.
- Breward, Christopher (2003). Fashion. Oxford History of Art. Oxford: Oxford University Press. ISBN 978-0-19-158773-3. OCLC 51315397.
- Esguerra, Clarissa M.; Hansen, Michaela (2022). Lee Alexander McQueen: Mind, Mythos, Muse. New York City: Delmonico Books. ISBN 978-1-63681-018-8. OCLC 1289986708.
- Fairer, Robert; Wilcox, Claire (2016). Alexander McQueen: Unseen. New Haven, Connecticut: Yale University Press. ISBN 978-0-300-22267-8. OCLC 946216643.
- Fox, Chloe (2012). Vogue On: Alexander McQueen. Vogue on Designers. London: Quadrille Publishing. ISBN 978-1849491136. OCLC 828766756.
- Gleason, Katherine (2012). Alexander McQueen: Evolution. New York City: Race Point Publishing. ISBN 978-1-61058-837-9. OCLC 783147416.
- Homer, Karen (2023). Little Book of Alexander McQueen: The Story of the Iconic Brand. London: Welbeck Publishing Group. ISBN 978-1-80279-270-6.
- Knox, Kristin (2010). Alexander McQueen: Genius of a Generation. London: A&C Black. ISBN 978-1-4081-3223-4. OCLC 794296806.
- Koda, Harold (2003). Goddess: The Classical Mode. New York City: Metropolitan Museum of Art. ISBN 978-1-58839-047-9.
- Mora, Juliana Luna; Berry, Jess (2 September 2022). "Creative Direction Succession in Luxury Fashion: The Illusion of Immortality at Chanel and Alexander McQueen". Luxury. 9 (2–3): 117–140. doi:10.1080/20511817.2022.2194039. ISSN 2051-1817.
- Muschamp, Herbert (2009). "From Olympus, Divine Dresses". Hearts of the City: The Selected Writings of Herbert Muschamp. New York City: Alfred A. Knopf. pp. 728–732. ISBN 978-0-375-40406-1.
- Thomas, Dana (2015). Gods and Kings: The Rise and Fall of Alexander McQueen and John Galliano. New York City: Penguin Publishing. ISBN 978-1-101-61795-3. OCLC 951153602.
- Watt, Judith (2012). Alexander McQueen: The Life and the Legacy. New York City: Harper Design. ISBN 978-1-84796-085-6. OCLC 892706946.
- Wilcox, Claire, ed. (2015). Alexander McQueen. New York City: Abrams Books. ISBN 978-1-4197-1723-9. OCLC 891618596.
  - Bethune, Kate. "Encyclopedia of Collections". In Wilcox (2015), pp. 303–326.
  - Brown, Susanna. "Nightmares and Dreams". In Wilcox (2015), pp. 285–300.
  - Lodwick, Keith. "Coup de Théâtre". In Wilcox (2015), pp. 247–251.
  - O'Neill, Alistair. "The Shining and Chic". In Wilcox (2015), pp. 261–280.
  - Skogh, Lisa. "Museum of the Mind". In Wilcox (2015), pp. 178–184.
  - Thomas, Abraham. "Drawing a Line". In Wilcox (2015), pp. 60–67.
  - Wilcox, Claire. "Plato's Atlantis: Anatomy of a Collection". In Wilcox (2015), pp. 83–103.
- Wilson, Andrew (2015). Alexander McQueen: Blood Beneath the Skin. New York City: Simon and Schuster. ISBN 978-1-4767-7674-3. OCLC 1310585849.
- Witek, Terri (2008). The Shipwreck Dress. Alexandria, Virginia: Orchises Press. ISBN 978-1-932535-17-4. OCLC 145379001.
