= Terrie =

Terrie is a given name. Notable people with this name include the following:

- Terrie Hall (1960–2013), American anti-smoking and anti-tobacco advocate
- Terrie Huntington, American politician
- Terrie Miller (born 1978), American-born Norwegian swimmer
- Terrie Moffitt (born 1955), German-born American clinical psychologist
- Terrie Pickerill, American political strategist
- Terrie Suit (born 1964), French-born American politician
- Terrie Sultan (born 1952), American art historian and museum director
- Terrie John Trosper (1969–1991), Satanic panic victim
- Terrie Waddell, Australian actress
- Terrie Williams (born 1954), American writer
- Terrie Williams (scientist), American marine biologist and ecophysiologist
- Terrie Wood, American politician

== See also ==
- Terie Norelli
- Terre
- Teri
- Tery
- Terri
- Terry
- Terria (disambiguation)
- Terrier (disambiguation)
- Terrine (disambiguation)
