= La Dame Bleue =

2008 fashion collection by Alexander McQueen

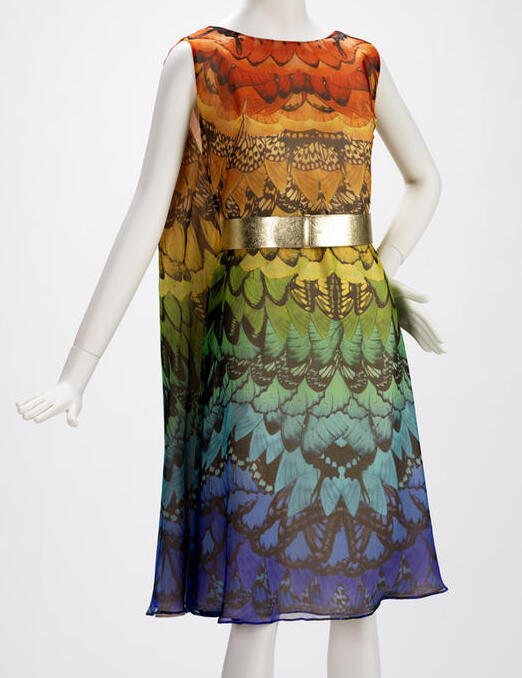
Chiffon dress with butterfly print from La Dame Bleue

La Dame Bleue is the thirty-first collection by British fashion designer Alexander McQueen, released for the Spring/Summer 2008 season of his eponymous fashion house. The collection was developed as a memorial for McQueen's mentor and muse, Isabella Blow, following her suicide in May 2007. It was created in collaboration with hatmaker Philip Treacy, another of Blow's protégés; he and McQueen had a long-standing working relationship. La Dame Bleue was inspired by Blow's exuberant personal style and ability to reinvent herself through fashion.

McQueen revisited many of his personal signatures for the collection, particularly tailored suits with exaggerated silhouettes, which Blow had worn to emphasise her hourglass figure. Draped gowns contrasted the tailored designs, drawing on McQueen's time at Givenchy. Designs in soft colours suggested delicacy, while more theatrical looks in black and neon colours showcased bold assertiveness. The collection incorporated nature, sexuality, and Japanese clothing, which McQueen had explored in many previous seasons. Hats played a large role in tribute to Blow's love of elaborate avant-garde headwear, and extreme platform heels featured in many looks.

The runway show was staged on 5 October 2007 at the Palais Omnisports de Paris-Bercy in Paris. The invitations depicted Blow ascending to heaven and the venue was perfumed with her signature scent. The show's backdrop was a giant pair of wings built out of LED lights, which flashed various colours throughout. Theatrics were otherwise kept to a minimum. Fifty-five looks were presented. (Note: For convenience, when referring to individual looks, this article uses the numbering from the Vogue retrospective of the collection. Their overview counts 54 looks, but the photo for Look 27 shows two models with matching ensembles who walked together. Look numbers mentioned in this article have not been adjusted.)

La Dame Bleue was well-received by critics, who appreciated the emphasis on the designs over the showmanship. Academic analysis has considered the symbolism of the nature motifs and the winged backdrop. The show's extreme heels have been credited as a possible influence on a trend for "statement" shoes. Items from the collection are owned by several museums and have appeared in various exhibits including Alexander McQueen: Savage Beauty.

== Background ==
British fashion designer Alexander McQueen was known for his imaginative, sometimes controversial designs, and dramatic fashion shows. Over the course of his career, which lasted from 1992 until his death in 2010, he explored a broad range of ideas and themes, particularly sexuality, death, violence, romanticism, and historicism. He learned tailoring as an apprentice on Savile Row, and dressmaking as head designer at French fashion house Givenchy. (Note: From October 1996 to October 2001, McQueen was simultaneously head designer at Givenchy and at his own label.) Although he worked in ready-to-wear – clothing produced for retail sale – his showpiece designs featured a degree of craftsmanship that verged on haute couture.

I learned a lot from her death [...] I learned a lot about myself. [I learned] that life is worth living. Because I'm just fighting against it, fighting against the establishment. She loved fashion, and I love fashion, and I was just in denial.

— McQueen, reflecting on the death of Isabella Blow, interviewed in W, June 2008

McQueen's 1992 graduation collection, Jack the Ripper Stalks His Victims, was bought in its entirety by magazine editor Isabella Blow, who became his mentor and his muse. Blow used her industry connections to promote his early career, introduced him to collaborators, and supported his creative vision. Their relationship deteriorated after McQueen was hired at Givenchy in 1996 and did not secure an expected position for Blow, as he had for other associates. Things remained turbulent between them, and they were estranged when Blow – who had long suffered from physical and mental health issues – committed suicide in May 2007. McQueen has sometimes been accused of exacerbating her depression by failing to support her financially and emotionally. Despite their differences, McQueen was devastated by her death.

Early in their respective careers, Blow had introduced McQueen to milliner Philip Treacy, another of her protégés. Their relationship was somewhat difficult at first, as they vied for Blow's attention. They first worked together on McQueen's The Hunger (Spring/Summer 1996). For Bellmer La Poupée (Spring/Summer 1997), McQueen hired a replacement hatmaker who Treacy did not get along with, specifically to irritate him. In spite of their early issues, they became close collaborators and worked together for the remainder of McQueen's career.

== Concept and collection ==
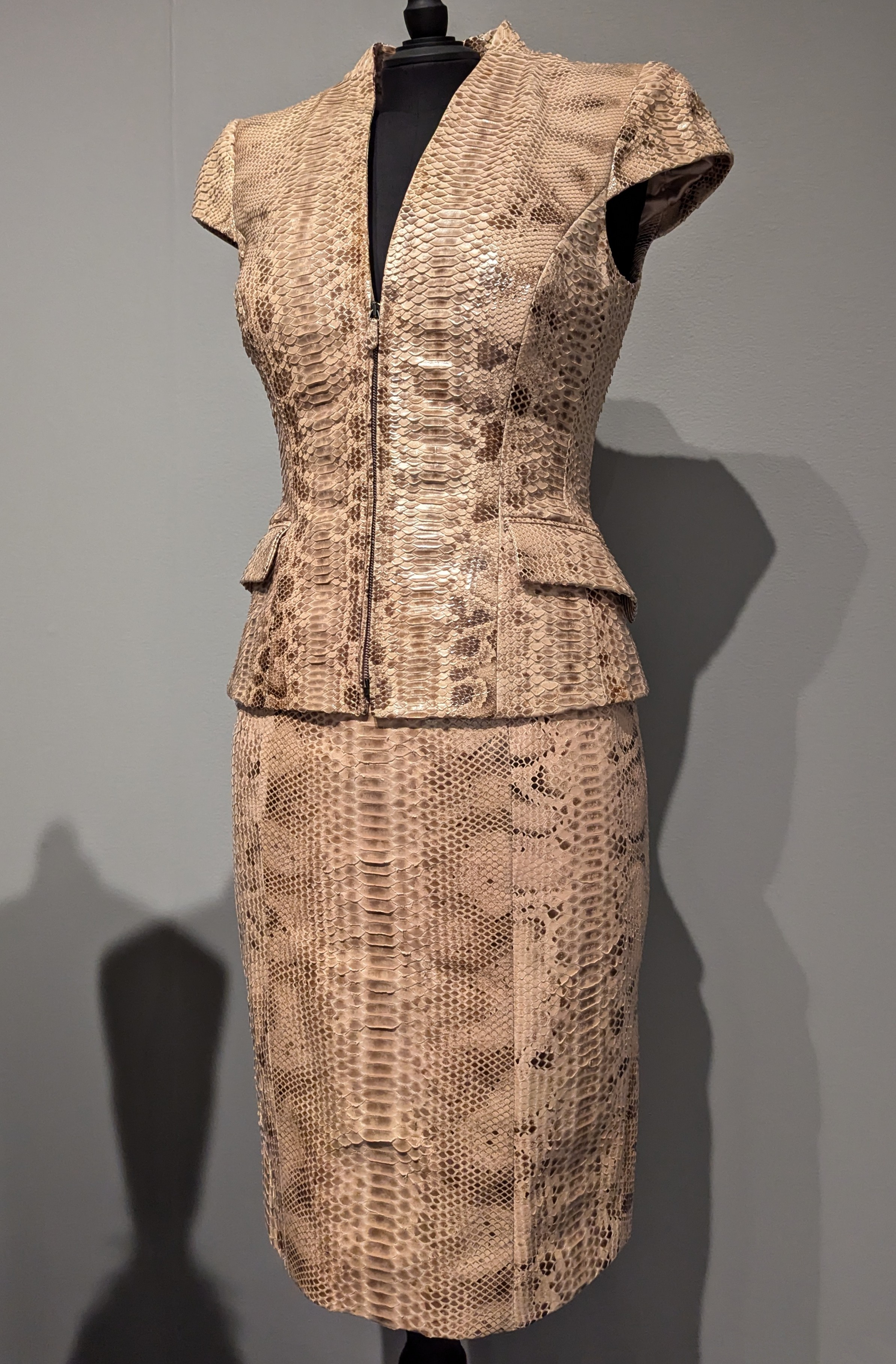
Tailored snakeskin dress as presented at Lee Alexander McQueen & Ann Ray – Rendez-Vous

La Dame Bleue is the thirty-first collection McQueen released for the Spring/Summer 2008 season of his eponymous fashion house. Following Blow's suicide, McQueen visited a psychic medium, hoping to communicate with her spirit in the afterlife. The psychic told him that she wanted to be remembered in death as La Dame Bleue – French for "the Blue Lady". (Note: The name may also have been a reference to a legend about a ghost of the same name said to have been encountered by Louis XV on a hunting trip.) The collection, titled accordingly, was developed in collaboration with Philip Treacy as a memorial for Blow, themed around her exuberant personal style and ability to reinvent herself through fashion. The show notes described the inspiration as "extreme glamour". La Dame Bleue presents two contrasting visions of femininity: designs in chiffon and soft colours suggested a graceful, delicate woman, while more theatrical looks in black and neon colours showcased bold assertiveness.

McQueen returned to many of his personal signatures for the collection, particularly tailored suits and body-conscious dresses. Blow preferred to wear tailored ensembles to emphasise her hourglass figure. Early items in the collection were tailored office-appropriate ensembles in traditional menswear fabric like Prince of Wales check and tartan mohair. The silhouette was altered with exaggerated shoulders and hips, and waists were cinched tight with belts. There was also a suite of tailored dresses and suits in snakeskin, with angular shoulders and plunging necklines. One of these was a bright pink version of a design McQueen had created for Givenchy, which Blow owned.

McQueen contrasted the tightly tailored designs with a number of draped gowns, drawing on his time in the haute couture workshop of Givenchy. There were floaty chiffon dresses in soft colours and glamorous evening dresses. A sequined black dress subtly depicted Blow's face in translucent beads. Several gowns had wings for collars, including a full-length one in black with gold wings on the shoulders.

The designs drew on Blow's love of nature and birds, which McQueen and Treacy shared. Colourful prints in feathered and butterfly patterns recurred throughout, evoking exotic birds of paradise; these were commissioned from designer Jonathan Saunders. Many garments incorporated actual feathers or even whole bird parts. Bird wings formed the collar of some dresses, referencing McQueen and Blow's mutual love of falconry. Avian motifs appeared in less overt ways as well. Overlapping round silver paillettes covered one dress, similar to the way feathers overlap on a bird's body. A padded leather jacket was formed from shapes resembling wings; these were actually reworked trainer moulds, a reference to McQueen's shoe design collaboration with the athletics brand Puma.

There were a number of references to Japanese clothing in the collection; McQueen was fascinated with Japanese culture and frequently incorporated Japanese elements into his designs. Flowing gowns in neon colours with kimono sleeves referenced McQueen's Japanese-influenced Autumn/Winter 1997 collection for Givenchy. Look 39 in particular fuses Eastern and Western styles. It features floor-length sleeves inspired by the long sleeves of the furisode-style kimono traditionally worn by young women, combined with a Western plunging neckline and ombre dye. Belts inspired by the Japanese obi sash featured on some of the tailored ensembles, while grid-like belts in various colours of patent leather drew on Japanese fashion of the 1970s. Some dresses had trapezoidal shapes with pointed, protruding hips; these may have been a reference to the unusual silhouettes pursued by Japanese designers that Blow favoured, such as Junya Watanabe.

Sexuality, which played a major role in McQueen's work, was emphasised in La Dame Bleue through BDSM elements. Throughout his career, he had used oversized leather belts to cinch the waist; here they appeared on looks ranging from elegant gowns to sadomasochistic bodysuits. In one look, the grid-patterned belt was taken to an extreme and made into an entire dress. The kimono in Look 39 featured a sculpted leather belt resembling a butterfly. Another dress referenced a Yves Saint Laurent draped toga dress from Spring/Summer 1990 that famously left a breast exposed, although in McQueen's version the breast was partially covered in sheer black lace. Some items touched on the idea of armour as clothing; the use of metallic pailettes suggested the look of scale mail made glamorous.

La Dame Bleue contained many references to ideas from previous collections. The many rainbow dresses were a clear call-back to the many tropical bird prints of Irere (Spring/Summer 2003), which had also been created by Saunders. The use of full bird parts was a possible reference to Voss (Spring/Summer 2001), which featured a dress with taxidermy hawks. The trapezoidal dresses were possibly inspired by the shape of the tricorne hat from the "highwayman" outfit in Supercalifragilisticexpialidocious (Autumn/Winter 2002). Crystal-embellished lace stockings returned from Deliverance (Spring/Summer 2004), while the exaggerated hips and georgette gowns in dusty colours drew on the silhouette and colour palette of Sarabande (Spring/Summer 2007).

=== Accessories ===
Blow loved elaborate avant-garde hats, especially those which covered the face; in tribute to her taste, Treacy created a large number of headpieces in a variety of styles for the runway show. Silver wire hairnets adorned with Swarovski crystal dragonflies were paired with tweed suits. A flock of red butterflies made from hand-painted turkey feathers surrounded one model's entire face. A pair of twin black and pink dresses had matching fencing masks. One style was coiled like a snail shell, while another was elaborately rendered in tin.

Frequent McQueen collaborator Shaun Leane provided a large metal framework he called the "Grille Collar" for one look. It consisted of fifteen thin aluminium bars set parallel to each other, which appear to sprout from the model's waist and bend to create a horizontal visor across her face. The grille is attached to a waist harness concealed beneath the garment. Leane had "challenged himself to explore the negative space around the model" rather than creating a piece that rested on the body. The grid creates an armoured appearance, like many of the other items in the collection.

The collection also featured extremely high double-heeled platform shoes inspired by the Japanese geta and Venetian chopine.

== Runway show ==
=== Production details ===
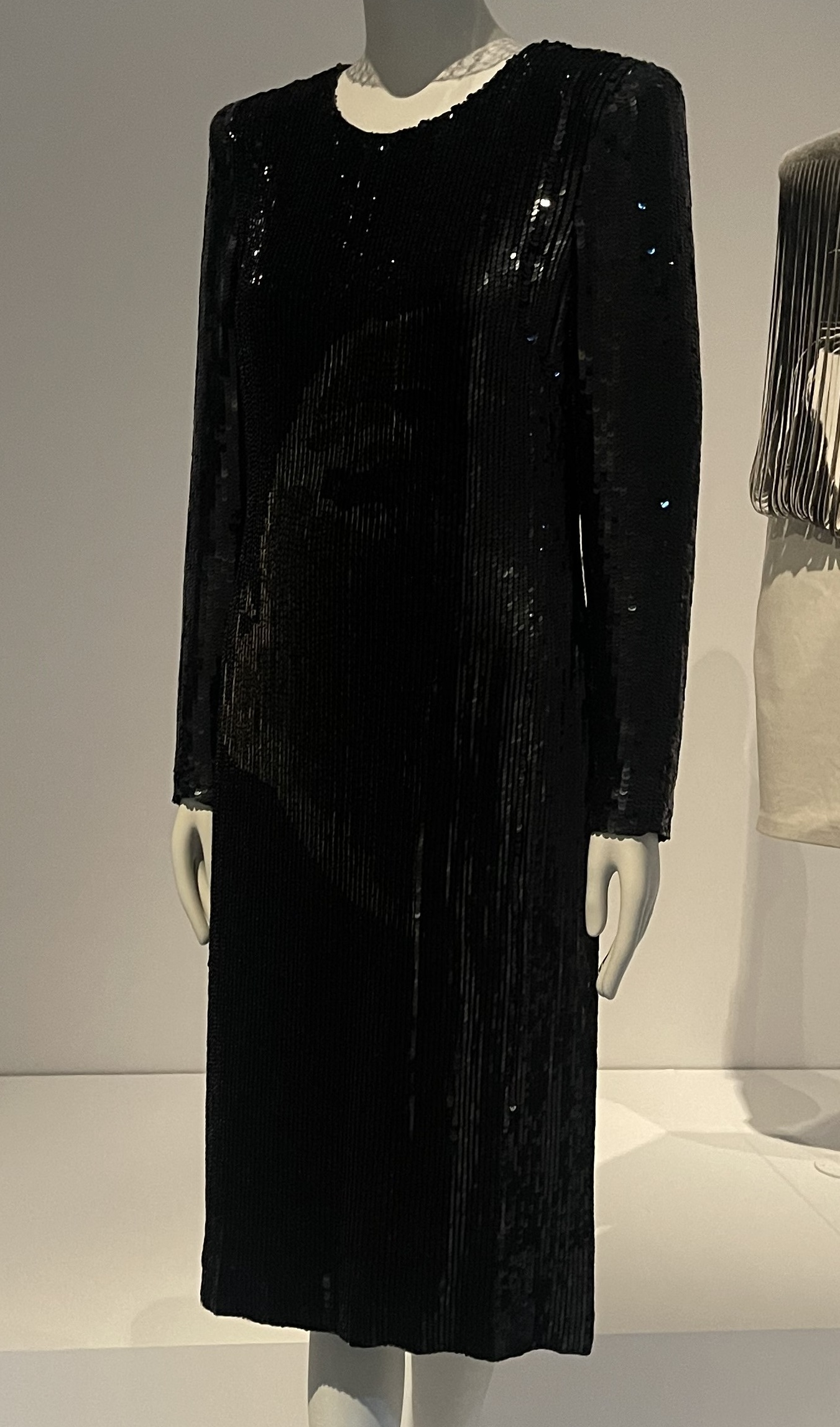
Look 25 with Blow's face in beads at Lee Alexander McQueen: Mind, Mythos, Muse at the Musée national des beaux-arts du Québec

The runway show was staged on 5 October 2007 at the Palais Omnisports de Paris-Bercy in Paris. The invitations were posters showing Blow, dressed in a McQueen dress and a Treacy hat, ascending to heaven in a chariot drawn by a pair of white horses representing the two men. McQueen's friend Richard Gray provided the art, from McQueen's detailed vision. The venue was perfumed with Blow's preferred scent, Fracas, by Robert Piguet, and each audience member was gifted a bottle.

Tabitha Simmons took care of overall styling, Paul Hanlon handled hair, and Peter Philips styled make-up. Gainsbury & Whiting oversaw production. Joseph Bennett returned for set design. Warren Du Preez and Nick Thornton Jones built the winged backdrop and Simon Kenny was responsible for installation and takedown.

The show's backdrop was a giant pair of wings built out of 400 LED lights in tubes, mounted on steel frames. The lights shifted through white, blue, purple, pink, and red during the show. The floor and background were black, and the floor was glossy enough to reflect the lights. McQueen was inspired by a metal sculpture mounted on a building, which he had spotted in Islington, as well as imagery of angels and birds. He told du Preez that he wanted to make "a bird of light that towered over the industry that killed Isabella [Blow]".

Make-up was natural, limited to a light application of lip gloss. Some models were styled with feathers in various colours on their faces. Hairstyles featured rolled-under fringe like those seen in the film The Women (1939).

=== Catwalk presentation ===
The show began with the stage lights down and only the backdrop sculpture lit. The lights on the sculpture began to pulse, accompanied by the sound of wings, suggesting a bird taking to the air. There was an avian screech and a disco beat began to play as the first model entered the catwalk. Models walked from beneath the wings to the end of the catwalk and straight back.

Fifty-five looks were presented. The show opened with a series of tailored ensembles inspired by McQueen's Savile Row origins. Alice Gibb wore the opening ensemble, a tailored grey day dress paired with a dragonfly headdress. An eclectic series of designs followed, first in light daytime colours and shifting to bolder, darker shades at Look 20. Looks 43 to 46 were gowns in rainbow prints. Raquel Zimmerman closed the show in a full-length gown covered in feathers and dramatic feathered headdress. The room darkened and the backdrop wings turned red as she exited the stage.

The lights came back out and the models came out for their final turn to the sound of "Play Me" (1972) by Neil Diamond. The lyrics, including phrases like "You are the sun, I am the moon," may have been a reference to McQueen and Blow's relationship. McQueen and Treacy came out to take their bows hand in hand, McQueen wearing a Mickey Mouse sweatshirt and kilt in McQueen family tartan.

== Reception ==
La Dame Bleue was well-received by critics and the audience. The low-key presentation attracted praise for allowing McQueen's designs to take the forefront. The twin dresses from Look 27 with shoulder pads were best-sellers and popular on red carpet.

Sarah Mower of Vogue made a point of judging the collection for the clothing, regardless of the emotional inspiration behind it, and felt it was a success. In her view, McQueen had successfully drawn on both his Savile Row tailoring and his couture experience at Givenchy to "show his capabilities in cut, drape, and feathered flourish". She thought the "romantic fairy-goddess chiffons" were on-trend for the season, although she disliked the waist-cinching belts, calling them "a hangover from winter".

Susannah Frankel at The Independent was pleased with the collection, calling it "a sight for sore eyes" in comparison to the other collections presented that season, which she found overly demure.

Writing in retrospect, Judith Watt regarded it as "one of his most beautiful collections".

Isabella's husband, Detmar Blow, was bitter towards McQueen following her suicide, feeling that McQueen had mistreated her. Some time after the show, he told McQueen, "Beautiful tribute. Pity she can't wear the clothes."

== Analysis ==
Anna Jackson of the V&A wrote that the inclusion of dragonflies was related to the collection's Japanese influences. In medieval Japanese culture, dragonflies were associated with "patriotism and valour", and by the twentieth century, they were used on clothing as symbols of summer. Curator Kate Bethune suggested the butterfly motifs were also a Japanese element, writing that they are "revered in Japan as the personification of the soul".

In her biography of Blow, Lauren Crowe suggested the wing sculpture was a reference to the Greek myth of Icarus, who died after he flew too close to the sun; she wrote that "the reference...was not lost on many." In contrast, Watt saw the backdrop as phoenix wings, implying a sense of rebirth or renewal. Textile curators Clarissa M. Esguerra and Michaela Hansen suggested that the beaded depiction of Blow's face on Look 25, visible only from specific angles, produced "an effect not unlike the experience of memory".

Alex Fury compared McQueen's theatrical fashion shows to the court masques of the Tudor and Jacobean eras of England. Masques were entertainments that involved music, pageantry, and elaborate set design; having been created to mark particular occasions, they were rarely re-staged. Fury compared the brief existence of a fashion show to the short lifespan of a butterfly, quoting Simon Kenny, who built the set for La Dame Bleue, to make his point: at the end of the show, the elaborate backdrop, which had taken a "week to build", would be "taken down, carted to London and sent to a scrapheap".

The staff reviewer at the Agence France-Presse thought the name might have been a reference to a legend about a ghost of the same name said to have been encountered by Louis XV on a hunting trip. They saw the concealed faces of some models as a possible additional reference to the king, who once asked one of his mistresses to cover her face.

== Legacy ==
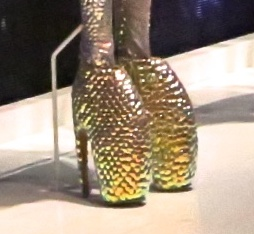
Side view of an armadillo shoe, covered in iridescent paillettes made to look like scales, from the final outfit of Plato's Atlantis

Following La Dame Bleue, McQueen travelled to India for a month with Shaun Leane, during which he processed his grief by learning about Buddhist spiritual teachings and culture. He incorporated his experiences in India into his Autumn/Winter 2008 collection, The Girl Who Lived in the Tree.

The extreme heels in La Dame Bleue have been credited as a possible influence on a trend for "statement" shoes that persisted over the next few fashion seasons. McQueen revisited extreme platforms with houndstooth boots for The Horn of Plenty (Autumn/Winter 2009). His following collection, Plato's Atlantis (Spring/Summer 2010), featured another extreme platform shoe, the armadillo shoe. These runway-only designs are almost 12 inches (30 cm) from top to sole, with a 9-inch (23 cm) spike heel. Several models declined to walk in Plato's Atlantis because of their concerns that the heels were too high to be safe, although in the end none fell.

In 2017, Leane auctioned a number of pieces he had created for the house at Sotheby's in New York. It was estimated that the "Grille Collar" framework would sell for $30,000–$50,000, but it failed to sell.

Annabelle Neilson, a model and friend of McQueen's, died in 2018; in 2020, her collection of McQueen designs was auctioned. Five looks from La Dame Bleue were sold, including the long pink kimono from Look 39. Another of McQueen's friends, Alice Smith, auctioned a collection of McQueen memorabilia in 2020; an invitation from La Dame Bleue sold for $334.

=== Museum ownership and exhibitions ===
A copy of Look 25, the dress with Blow's face, has been on loan to the Metropolitan Museum of Art (the Met) in New York City since 2019 from the collection of Sandy Schreier. The Los Angeles County Museum of Art (LACMA) owns a copy of the same item. The National Gallery of Victoria owns a copy of the pink and purple kimono gown with black leather belt and sandals. The Fashion Institute of Design & Merchandising Museum in Los Angeles owns a copy of a blazer with red ruffle trim at the collar.

Four items from La Dame Bleue appeared in Alexander McQueen: Savage Beauty, a retrospective exhibition of McQueen's designs: the dragonfly headpiece from Look 1, the butterfly headdress from Look 6, the tin headdress from Look 20, and a pair of wooden chopines from an unknown look. Several items from the collection were included in Isabella Blow: Fashion Galore!, a 2013 retrospective of Blow's fashion held at Somerset House in London. The Met's copy of Look 25, the sequined black dress with Blow's face, appeared in In Pursuit of Fashion: The Sandy Schreier Collection (2019). The copy owned by LACMA appeared in the museum's 2022 exhibition Lee Alexander McQueen: Mind, Mythos, Muse.

== Bibliography ==
- Bolton, Andrew (2011). Alexander McQueen: Savage Beauty. New York City: Metropolitan Museum of Art. ISBN 978-1-58839-412-5. OCLC 687693871.
  - Frankel, Susannah. Introduction. In Bolton (2011), pp. 17–27.
- Callahan, Maureen (2014). Champagne Supernovas: Kate Moss, Marc Jacobs, Alexander McQueen, and the '90s Renegades Who Remade Fashion. New York City: Touchstone Books. ISBN 978-1-4516-4053-3.
- Crowe, Lauren Goldstein (2010). Isabella Blow: A Life in Fashion. New York City: Thomas Dunne Books. ISBN 978-1-4299-8538-3.
- Esguerra, Clarissa M.; Hansen, Michaela (2022). Lee Alexander McQueen: Mind, Mythos, Muse. New York City: Delmonico Books. ISBN 978-1-63681-018-8. OCLC 1289986708.
- Fairer, Robert; Wilcox, Claire (2016). Alexander McQueen: Unseen. New Haven, Connecticut: Yale University Press. ISBN 978-0-300-22267-8. OCLC 946216643.
- Fox, Chloe (2012). Vogue On: Alexander McQueen. Vogue on Designers. London: Quadrille Publishing. ISBN 978-1849491136. OCLC 828766756.
- Gleason, Katherine (2012). Alexander McQueen: Evolution. New York City: Race Point Publishing. ISBN 978-1-61058-837-9. OCLC 783147416.
- Homer, Karen (2023). Little Book of Alexander McQueen: The Story of the Iconic Brand. London: Welbeck Publishing Group. ISBN 978-1-80279-270-6.
- Knox, Kristin (2010). Alexander McQueen: Genius of a Generation. London: A&C Black. ISBN 978-1-4081-3223-4. OCLC 794296806.
- Mora, Juliana Luna; Berry, Jess (2 September 2022). "Creative Direction Succession in Luxury Fashion: The Illusion of Immortality at Chanel and Alexander McQueen". Luxury. 9 (2–3): 117–140. doi:10.1080/20511817.2022.2194039. ISSN 2051-1817.
- Thomas, Dana (2015). Gods and Kings: The Rise and Fall of Alexander McQueen and John Galliano. New York City: Penguin Publishing. ISBN 978-1-101-61795-3. OCLC 951153602.
- Watt, Judith (2012). Alexander McQueen: The Life and the Legacy. New York City: Harper Design. ISBN 978-1-84796-085-6. OCLC 892706946.
- Wilcox, Claire, ed. (2015). Alexander McQueen. New York City: Abrams Books. ISBN 978-1-4197-1723-9. OCLC 891618596.
  - Bethune, Kate. "Encyclopedia of Collections". In Wilcox (2015), pp. 303–326.
  - Cullen, Oriole. "Crowning Glory". In Wilcox (2015), pp. 210–219.
  - Fury, Alex. "Show, and Tell". In Wilcox (2015), pp. 220–233.
  - Jackson, Anna. "Refashioning Japan". In Wilcox (2015), pp. 116–121.
  - Persson, Helen. "Walking Out". In Wilcox (2015), pp. 110–115.
- Wilson, Andrew (2015). Alexander McQueen: Blood Beneath the Skin. New York City: Simon and Schuster. ISBN 978-1-4767-7674-3. OCLC 1310585849.
