= Senator Terry =

Senator Terry may refer to:

- P. S. Terry (1876–1936), Missouri State Senate
- Rex Terry (1888–1964), South Dakota State Senate
- Walter Terry (1909–1977), Wisconsin State Senate
- William L. Terry (1850–1917), Arkansas State Senate
