= Terri =

- Pronunciation: /ˈtɛri/
- Gender: Female

Other names
- Alternative spelling: Terry
- Derived: diminutive of Teresa

Terri is an alternative spelling of Terry. It is a feminine given name and is also a diminutive for Teresa.

Notable people with the name include:

- Terri Allard (born 1962), American country/folk singer/songwriter
- Terri S. Armstrong, American scientist
- Terri Attwood (born 1959), English professor
- Terri Austin (born 1955), American educator and politician
- Terri Bennett, Irish cricketer
- Terri Bjerre (born 1966), American musician
- Terri Blackstock (born 1957), American Christian fiction writer
- Terri Bonoff, American politician
- Terri Brisbin, American historical romance author
- Terri Brosius, American musician and voice actor
- Terri Brown, American athlete
- Terri Bryant, American politician
- Terri Butler, Australian politician
- Terri Lyne Carrington, jazz drummer, composer, and record producer
- Terri Carver, American politician
- Terri Cater, Australian sprinter and middle-distance runner
- Terri Clark, Canadian country music artist
- Terri Collins, American politician
- Terri Conley, American social psychologist
- Terri Conn, American actress
- Terri Crawford, Canadian musician
- Terri Cruz (1927-2017), American community organizer
- Terri Dendy, American track and field athlete
- Terri Dial (1949–2012), American banker
- Terri Lynn Doss, American model and actress
- Terri Doty, American voice actress, voice director, and ADR writer
- Terri Dunning, British swimmer
- Terri Dwyer, English actress
- Terri-Rae Elmer, radio news announcer
- Terri Farley, American writer
- Terri Fields, American book writer and teacher
- Terri H. Finkel, American pediatric rheumatologist and immunologist
- Terri Garber, American actress
- Terri Gibbs, American country music artist
- Terri Grodzicker, American molecular geneticist and virologist
- Terri Hall (1953–2007), American erotic actress
- Terri Hardin, Muppet puppeteer, actress and stand-up comedian
- Terri Hanauer, Canadian-American actress
- Terri Crawford Hansen, American journalist
- Terri Harper, British professional boxer
- Terri Hawkes, Canadian actress
- Terri Hemmert, American radio personality and musicologist
- Terri Hendrix, contemporary folk singer-songwriter from Texas
- Terri L. Hill, American politician
- Terri Hoffman (1938–2015), American writer
- Terri Hogue, American hydrologist
- Terri Hollowell, American singer
- Terri Hoyos, American actress
- Terri Irwin, Australian, American-born naturalist, author, and owner of Australia Zoo at Beerwah, Queensland, Australia
- Terri Ivens, American actress
- Terri Janke, Wuthathi/Meriam Indigenous lawyer
- Terri Jentz, American writer
- Terri Jorgenson, American politician
- Terri Kimball, American model and Playmate of the Month
- Terri Kwan, Taiwanese actress, model, singer and author
- Texas Terri (formerly Terri Laird), punk rock singer and songwriter from Texas
- Terri Lynn Land, Michigan Secretary of State
- Terri Leigh, Canadian television anchor
- Terri McCormick, Wisconsin State Representative
- Terri Meyette, Yaqui poet
- Terri Edda Miller, American screenwriter, producer, and director
- Terri Minsky, American television writer and producer
- Terri Mitchell, American women's basketball coach
- Terri Moss, American boxer
- Terri Nunn, American singer and actress
- Terri O'Connell, motorsports racing champion
- Terri Paddock, American writer and arts journalist
- Terri Poch, American bodybuilder and former professional wrestler
- Terri Priest (1928–2014), American artist
- Terri Proud, American politician
- Terri Psiakis, Australian comedian and a presenter on radio and television
- Terri Quaye, English musician
- Terri Rachals, American nurse accused of murder
- Terri Rogers (1937–1999), English ventriloquist and magician
- Terri Roth, vice president of conservation and science at the Cincinnati Zoo and Botanical Garden
- Terri Runnels, American professional wrestling manager, television host and occasional wrestler
- Terri Russell, Australian cricket player
- Terri Schiavo (1963–2005), diagnosed as being in a persistent vegetative state (PVS) for several years
- Terri Schneider, American endurance athlete, motivational speaker, author, coach, and consultant
- Terri Scott, education executive
- Terri Sewell, American politician
- Terri Seymour, British television presenter
- Terri Sharp (1948–2015), American songwriter
- Terri Stoneburner, American lawyer and judge
- Terri Swearingen, American nurse
- Terri Funk Sypolt, American politician
- Terri Tatchell, Canadian screenwriter
- Terri Te Tau, New Zealand contemporary artist and writer
- Terri Willingham Thomas, American judge
- Terri Thompson, American business journalist
- Terri Treas, American actress, writer and director
- Terri Utley, beauty queen and motivational speaker
- Terri Vaughan, American insurance academic, regulator, and advisor
- Terri Violet, American politician
- Terri J. Vaughn, American film and television actress
- Terri Walker, English R&B and soul singer-songwriter
- Terri Lynn Weaver, American politician
- Terri Welles, American actress and adult model
- Terri White, American actress and singer
- Terri White (journalist), British journalist, editor and author
- Terri L. White, mental health executive
- Terri Williams-Flournoy, American women's basketball coach
- Terri Windling, American editor, artist, essayist, and the author of books for both children and adults
- Terri Witek, American poet
- Terri Young, American pediatric ophthalmologist
- Terri Zemaitis, American volleyball player

== Fictional characters ==
- Terri Alden, Three's Company
- Terri Johnstone, River City
- Terri McGreggor, Degrassi: The Next Generation
- Terri Schuester, Glee
- Terri Stivers, Homicide: Life on the Street
- Terri Webber, General Hospital
- Sherri and Terri, The Simpsons

== People with the last name Terri ==
- Salli Terri, a singer, arranger, recording artist, and songwriter

== Tropical cyclones ==
- Cyclone Terri (2001)

== See also ==
- Teri (given name)
- Tery
- Terrie
- Terry
