= Shellfish dress =

Shellfish dress may refer to:

- Shellfish dress, a dress from Blanche DuBois (Spring/Summer 1988) by John Galliano
- Oyster dress, a dress from Irere (Spring/Summer 2003) by Alexander McQueen
- Razor clam dress, a dress from Voss (Spring/Summer 2001) by Alexander McQueen
