= Pickerill =

Pickerill is an English surname.

Notable people with this surname include:

- Cecily Pickerill (1903-1988), New Zealand surgeon
- Clive Pickerill (born 1956), English rugby player
- Henry Percy Pickerill (1879–1956), New Zealand surgeon
- Jenny Pickerill (born 1973), British environmental geographer
- Terrie Pickerill, American political strategist
- William Pickerill, also spelled William Pikerell, English academic
- Andy Pickerill - Taxi Driver

== See also ==
- Pickerill Gas Field (sv) (ceb)
