= Terria =

Terria may refer to:

- Terria, WWII airfield in Libya No. 462 Squadron RAAF
- Terria, hamlet in Ferentillo
- Terria (consortium) Australian telecoms
- Terria (Devin Townsend album)

== See also ==
- Terraria
- Terrie, a given name
