= Michael Terry =

Michael Terry may refer to:

- Michael Terry (explorer) (1899–1981), Australian explorer, surveyor, prospector, and writer
- Michael Grant Terry (born 1984), American actor
- Michael Terry (serial killer) (born 1960), American serial killer
- Michael Terry (athlete) (born 1973), Antigua and Barbuda former middle-distance runner

== See also ==
- Michael Tarry (?–2013), Canadian singer
