= Tery =

Tery or Téry is a surname. Notable people with this surname include:

- Moshe Tery, Israeli politician
- Simone Téry (1897–1967), French journalist
- Ödön Téry (1890–1981), Hungarian gymnast

== See also ==
- Teri
- Terri
- Terrie
- Terry
