= Phoebe Putney Memorial Hospital =

Hospital in Georgia, United States

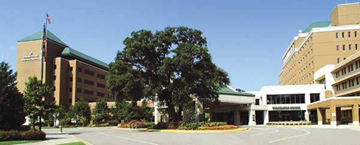

Geography
- Location: 417 W. Third Ave., Albany, Georgia (U.S. state), United States
- Coordinates: 31.591007°N 84.158241°W

Organization
- Care system: Not-for-profit
- Type: Teaching

Services
- Beds: 691

History
- Founded: 1911

Links
- Website: www.phoebehealth.com
- Lists: Hospitals in Georgia (U.S. state)

Phoebe Putney Memorial Hospital is a hospital in Albany, Georgia.

== History ==
The hospital was created using a donation of $25,000 from Judge Francis Flagg Putney. At his request, the hospital was named after his mother, Phoebe. The hospital opened on August 1, 1911.

In 1986, the hospital was at the center of a criminal case after a GBI investigation following an unusually high percentage of cardiac arrests. Nurse Terri Rachals was indicted on twenty counts of aggravated assault, and convicted on one count as "guilty but mentally ill" of aggravated assault with intent to murder. Potassium chloride was injected into a bag of frozen plasma which was then introduced to a patient's body.

In 2010, the facility bought out the area's only other hospital, Palmyra Medical Center, for $195 million. PMC was owned by Hospital Corporation of America, the country's largest hospital operator. The acquisition ended a lawsuit over Palmyra's provision of obstetric services.

Because of the merger, the hospital agreed to a settlement with the Federal Trade Commission in 2013 that for the next 10 years, PPMH and the Hospital Authority of Albany-Dougherty County, without first notifying the FTC, would not acquire another medical facility within Dougherty, Lee, Baker, Terrell, Worth, and Mitchell Counties. PPMH and the hospital authority also agreed for the next five years to not file an objection to a Certificate of Need granted to a general acute care hospital within the six county region.

On June 7, 2018, the hospital announced its president and CEO Joel Wernick would be retiring in May 2019 after 30 years in that position.

== Governance and Organizational Structure ==
Phoebe Putney Memorial Hospital is operated by Phoebe Putney Health System, a nonprofit healthcare organization that manages multiple hospitals and clinics across southwest Georgia. The hospital facilities are owned by the Hospital Authority of Albany–Dougherty County, a public authority, and leased to the nonprofit operator under a long-term agreement. This governance structure allows the hospital to access tax-exempt financing and other public benefits while day-to-day operations are conducted by the nonprofit system.

The governance arrangement has been the subject of public scrutiny regarding the extent of independent oversight exercised by the hospital authority.

== Expansion and Market Consolidation ==
In 2010, Phoebe Putney Health System acquired Palmyra Medical Center, eliminating hospital competition in Albany. The acquisition was challenged by the Federal Trade Commission and resulted in a U.S. Supreme Court decision, FTC v. Phoebe Putney Health System, Inc. (2013), which held that the transaction was not automatically immune from federal antitrust law under the state-action doctrine.

Despite the ruling, Phoebe retained its dominant position as the primary hospital system serving Albany and surrounding counties in southwest Georgia.

== Quality Ratings and Clinical Outcomes ==
Following its expansion, Phoebe Putney Memorial Hospital received low ratings on several national hospital quality measures. In 2012, the hospital received an “F” grade from the Leapfrog Group, reflecting concerns related to patient safety and staffing.

The hospital later received a one-star rating from the Centers for Medicare & Medicaid Services, placing it among the lowest-rated hospitals in Georgia at the time.

== Financial Performance and Debt ==
The acquisition of Palmyra Medical Center was financed largely through borrowing, resulting in substantial long-term debt for the hospital system. ProPublica reported that financial pressures following the acquisition coincided with staffing reductions and increased reliance on contract labor.

During this period, executive compensation at Phoebe Putney Health System exceeded that of leaders at several nationally ranked nonprofit hospital systems, drawing attention to nonprofit governance practices.

== Oversight and Consultant Review ==
In 2021, the Hospital Authority of Albany–Dougherty County commissioned an independent consultant review to assess Phoebe’s quality of care, costs, charity care, and financial performance relative to peer institutions. The consultants found that Phoebe ranked below national averages on multiple quality metrics, charged higher prices than peers, and devoted a smaller share of revenue to charity care.

The hospital authority declined to publicly release the report at the time, citing concerns about potential reputational harm to the hospital.

== Community Impact and Public Controversies ==
Phoebe Putney Memorial Hospital is the largest employer in Albany and plays a central role in the local economy. Journalists have reported that this economic influence has contributed to reluctance among local officials and residents to publicly criticize the hospital.

Public disputes have arisen over hospital-related development projects, including the demolition of a historic school building for hospital expansion, which was approved by the Albany City Commission following an appeal.

== Litigation ==
In 2023, the widow of a former Phoebe board member filed a medical negligence lawsuit against Phoebe Putney Health System and associated medical providers, alleging failures in care. The lawsuit was cited by ProPublica as part of broader reporting on accountability and patient safety concerns at the hospital.

== Captive Insurance and Offshore Accounts ==
Phoebe Putney Health System established a wholly owned captive insurance company in the Cayman Islands, originally known as Grove Pointe Indemnity and later Phoebe Putney Indemnity, Ltd., to provide malpractice and other liability coverage for the system. The captive operates under Cayman Islands insurance law and is consolidated into the health system’s financial statements."Phoebe Putney Indemnity, Ltd. Audited Financial Statements" (PDF).

In the mid-2000s, medical staff at Phoebe publicly called for an independent forensic audit of the captive insurer, citing concerns about transparency and offshore holdings."Phoebe Docs Call for Independent Audit". WALB. 2005.

Reporting summarized from travel records obtained by The Atlanta Journal-Constitution described executives and board members associated with the captive taking trips involving private aircraft and luxury accommodations for insurer meetings, prompting criticism from consumer advocates about nonprofit spending practices. Phoebe officials defended the arrangements as appropriate management of the insurance subsidiary."Nonprofit Funded Lavish Travel With Insurance Spin-Off". Consumer Watchdog (Summarizing AJC Reporting).

== Internal Criticism ==
ProPublica reported that in the early 2000s, internal critics circulated a document referred to as the “Phoebe Factoids,” raising concerns about executive compensation, billing, and governance. The episode contributed to heightened scrutiny of the system and its leadership."Sick in a Hospital Town, Part Two: The Making of a Monopoly". ProPublica. 2023.

== Media Coverage ==
A 2009 documentary titled Do No Harm examined allegations by Dr. John Bagnato and Charles Rehberg regarding Phoebe Putney’s treatment of uninsured patients and related financial practices. The film was screened publicly in Albany and covered by local media."Film Critical of Phoebe Shown in Albany". WALB. 2009.
