= Oyster dress =

2003 dress by Alexander McQueen

The oyster dress as displayed during the exhibition Alexander McQueen: Savage Beauty (2011)

The oyster dress is a high fashion gown created by British fashion designer Alexander McQueen for his Spring/Summer 2003 collection Irere. McQueen's design is a one-shouldered dress in bias-cut beige silk chiffon with a boned upper body and a full-length skirt consisting of hundreds of individual circles of organza sewn in dense layers to the base fabric, resembling the outside of an oyster shell. According to McQueen, the gown took a month's work for three people, who cut and assembled all the pieces individually. In addition to the original beige dress, a version with a red bodice and the ruffled skirt in rainbow colours was also created. The beige and red versions appeared in the Irere runway show, and were photographed for magazines to promote the collection.

The dress originated as a reinterpretation of the "shellfish dress" designed by John Galliano in 1987, which McQueen had long admired and sought to emulate. Contemporary critical response to McQueen's oyster dress was positive. It has become known as the most significant design from Irere, and is considered an iconic piece of McQueen's work, surpassing the famed Galliano original. Only two copies are known to exist, one held by the Metropolitan Museum of Art (the Met) in New York City and one by media personality Kim Kardashian. The Met's copy has appeared in several exhibitions, particularly the retrospective Alexander McQueen: Savage Beauty. McQueen returned to the oyster dress concept several times over his career, most prominently in his Autumn/Winter 2006 collection The Widows of Culloden.

== Background ==
Shellfish dress by John Galliano, 1987

British designer Alexander McQueen was known in the fashion industry for his imaginative, sometimes controversial designs. Although he worked in ready-to-wear – clothing produced for retail sale – his showpiece designs featured a degree of craftsmanship that verged on haute couture. Before launching his own label, McQueen apprenticed as a tailor on Savile Row, and he became known for a focus on tailored designs. From 1996 to 2001, he was head designer at French luxury design house Givenchy, where he learned le flou, or draping, the dressmaking side of haute couture.

McQueen's career roughly paralleled that of fellow British designer John Galliano, who entered the industry about a decade before him. The men had each graduated from Central Saint Martins art school in London: Galliano in 1984, and McQueen in 1992. Both had started their careers as independent designers before being hired by famous French fashion houses in the mid-1990s; McQueen had replaced Galliano at Givenchy when Galliano went to Dior. Their designs and shows were similarly creative and theatrical. During the period in which their careers overlapped, fashion journalists compared and contrasted their work and career choices, and they have sometimes been referred to as rivals. McQueen, who had a competitive streak, resented being compared to Galliano and often sought to emulate or outdo Galliano's ideas in his own work.

For his Spring/Summer 2003 collection, Irere, McQueen took inspiration from the Age of Discovery and the Amazon rainforest. He presented three sequential phases of ensembles: shipwrecked pirates, black-clad conquistadors, and colourful dresses inspired by tropical birds. McQueen described the collection as an effort to present a more mature point of view and surprise viewers with bold colours. Contemporary reception for Irere was positive, with many in the industry calling it one of the best collections for that season.

== Development and runway show ==
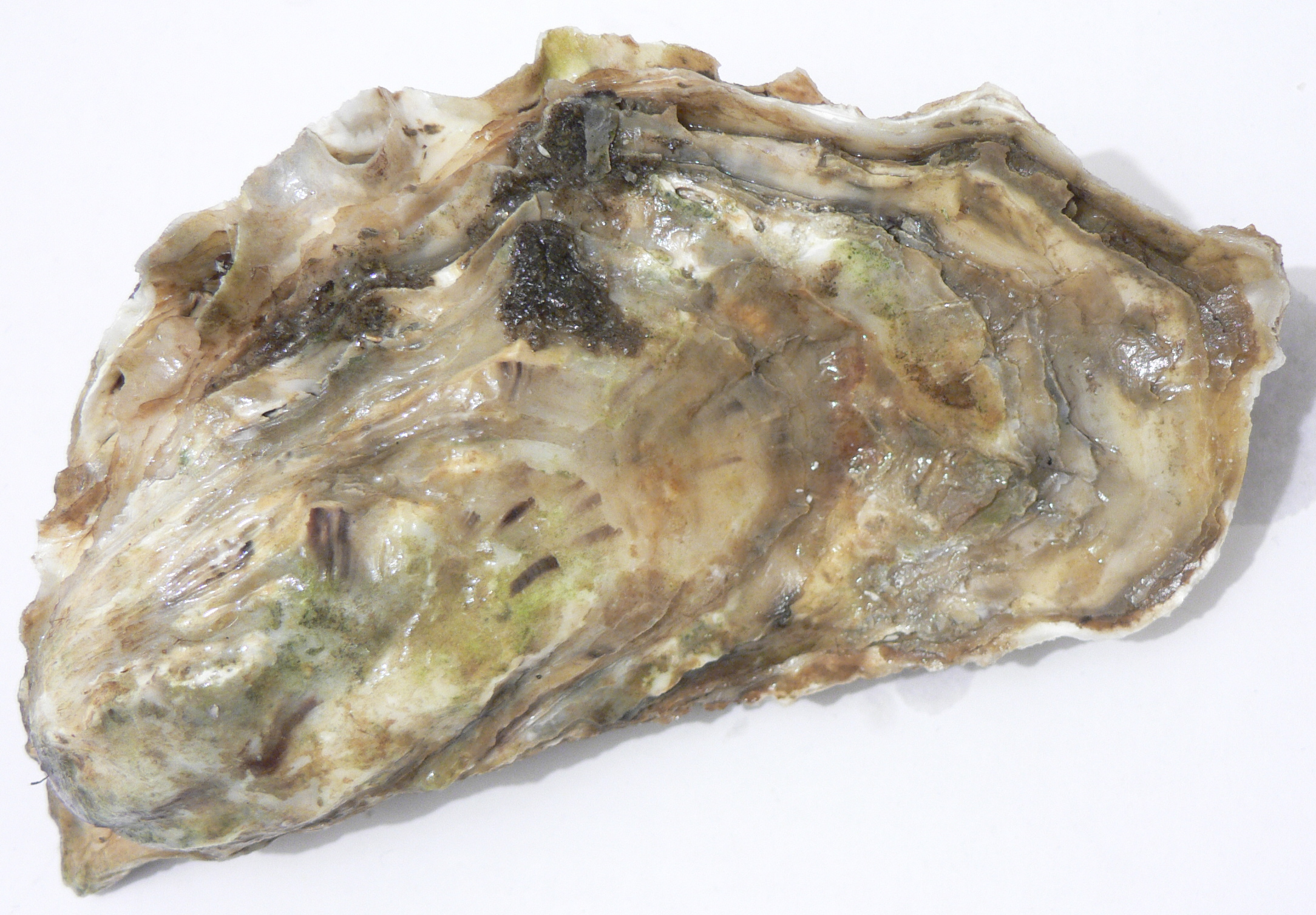
Shell of a Pacific oyster

The "oyster dress" is a reinterpretation of a 1987 design by John Galliano called the "shellfish dress". Galliano's shellfish dress was named for its layers of "pearl grey" organza ruffles that resembled stacked clamshells, a technically complex design that was executed by costumier Karen Crichton. McQueen had long admired and sought to emulate the complicated construction of the original. According to his friend Sebastian Pons, McQueen owned numerous "copies and photographs" of Galliano's dress and would study them intently, trying to work out how it was constructed.

McQueen's design is a one-shouldered dress in bias-cut beige silk chiffon with a boned upper body and a full-length skirt. Hundreds of individual circles of organza were sewn to the base fabric in dense layers, resembling an oyster shell or a mille-feuille pastry. An estimated 180–260 metres (200–285 yd) of fabric was required. According to McQueen, the gown took a month's work for three people to cut and assemble all the pieces. The cost was reportedly £45,000. In addition to the original beige dress, a version with a red bodice and the ruffled skirt in rainbow colours was also created.

The original beige gown appeared in the first, pirate-themed phase of the Irere runway show as Look 18, worn by Letícia Birkheuer. The version with the rainbow skirt appeared in the final phase as Look 49, worn on the runway by Michelle Alves. Both versions appeared in magazines to promote the collection. Natalia Vodianova wore the oyster dress for two photo shoots: Vogue in January 2003, photographed by Craig McDean, and Harper's Bazaar in March 2003, photographed by Peter Lindbergh. Socialite Daphne Guinness, a longtime friend of McQueen's, wore it for a 2003 photo shoot. The rainbow oyster dress appeared on the cover of Vogue Italia for their Spring/Summer 2003 issue. Joy Bryant wore it for a photo shoot for InStyle magazine in March 2003, calling it the "Rainbow Cancan" dress. Debra Messing wore the runway sample to an awards show in 2002.

== Legacy ==
The oyster dress is considered an iconic McQueen design; according to Pons and journalist Dana Thomas, it surpassed the famed Galliano original. In a contemporary review, Jess Cartner-Morley wrote that the dress exemplified the show's maritime theme, with chiffon layers that were "as soft and close as ripples on sand". Curator Kate Bethune wrote that it portrayed a sense of "[f]ragile femininity". Thomas called it "far more beautiful and elegant than the original" shellfish dress. Fashion curator Andrew Bolton labelled it "arguably the most important dress of the 21st century", and evidence that McQueen had expanded his skillset from his early focus on tailored designs and had mastered draping. Philosopher Gwenda-lin Grewal compared the destroyed look of the dress to the clothing of 19th-century dandies and 20th-century punks, both of which adopted torn clothing for aesthetic reasons. Author Ana Finel Honigman found that the lightness of the frills contrasted with the deconstructed appearance to create a "tension between gravity and transcendence".

McQueen returned to the oyster dress concept several times. Actress Liv Tyler wore a variation of the oyster gown to the Paris premiere of The Lord of the Rings: The Two Towers in December 2002. Her version had a corset bodice and a pink skirt made from 250 metres (273 yd) of silk organza. McQueen designed a wedding dress based on the oyster dress for the August 2004 wedding of his assistant Sarah Burton. Authors Judith Watt and Dana Thomas both described several dresses from The Widows of Culloden (Autumn/Winter 2006) as evolutions of the oyster dress, including the dress worn in the illusion of Kate Moss that served as the show's finale.

Sarah Burton, who replaced McQueen as the creative director for the Alexander McQueen brand, used the oyster dress technique for a look from the Pre-Spring/Summer 2021 collection. Her version was in pink, with a transition to black on the neckline and the bottom of the skirt. The organza fabric was recycled from stock, and the cutting was done by one of the seamstresses who worked on the original.

=== Extant copies ===
He wanted this idea of it—was almost like she drowned—and the top part of the dress is all fine boning and tulle, and the chiffon is all frayed and dishevelled on the top. The skirt is made out of hundreds and hundreds of circles of organza. Then, with a pen, what Lee did was he drew organic lines. And then all these circles were cut, joined together, and then applied in these lines along the skirt. So you created this organic, oyster-like effect.

— Sarah Burton

Following the show, McQueen estimated that 20 orders had been placed for copies of the oyster dress. However, only two copies of the beige original are known to exist. The Metropolitan Museum of Art (the Met) in New York City acquired the original runway sample in 2003, and it has appeared in the exhibitions Goddess: The Classical Mode (2003) and Blog Mode: Addressing Fashion (2008). The Met's oyster dress appeared with other clothing from Irere in both stagings of the retrospective exhibition Alexander McQueen: Savage Beauty. (Note: The catalogue produced for the original 2011 staging of Alexander McQueen: Savage Beauty says that all garments were lent by the Alexander McQueen archive unless otherwise noted. The oyster dress is not so noted, although The Met has owned its copy since 2003.)

Media personality Kim Kardashian owns the other known oyster dress, purchased from Los Angeles vintage boutique Lily et Cie. Its original owner was Texas socialite Angie Barrett, who purchased it from Neiman Marcus and wore it to the Cannes Film Festival and Beaux-Arts Ball in 2003. In 2020, Kardashian wore the oyster dress to an Oscars afterparty hosted by Vanity Fair. She had to travel to the event lying down in her car, because she feared the dress would "rip or pop or something" if she sat up. Critics have noted Kardashian's use of the oyster dress as part of a trend for celebrities choosing to wear archival items as red carpet wear. In 2022, Rachel Tashjian called this use of vintage fashion "basically the ultimate fashion flex right now". Fashion theorist Naomi Braithwaite argued that in acquiring archival fashion items, such as the oyster dress, Kardashian was attempting to integrate the cultural history of those objects into her own celebrity narrative, thereby increasing her own cultural significance by association. Thom Waite, writing for Dazed, criticised Kardashian in 2024 for playing a "risky game" by wearing fashion artifacts like the oyster dress for events; repeated wear increases the chance of damage to fragile older garments. (Note: Kardashian has been criticised for wearing a nude rhinestone dress originally worn by Marilyn Monroe to the 2022 Met Gala, damaging the 60-year-old garment.)

== See also ==
- List of individual dresses

== Bibliography ==
- Bolton, Andrew (2011). Alexander McQueen: Savage Beauty. New York City: Metropolitan Museum of Art. ISBN 978-1-58839-412-5. OCLC 687693871.
- Breward, Christopher (2003). Fashion. Oxford History of Art. Oxford: Oxford University Press. ISBN 978-0-19-158773-3.
- Fairer, Robert; Wilcox, Claire (2016). Alexander McQueen: Unseen. New Haven, Connecticut: Yale University Press. ISBN 978-0-300-22267-8. OCLC 946216643.
- Fox, Chloe (2012). Vogue On: Alexander McQueen. Vogue on Designers. London: Quadrille Publishing. ISBN 978-1849491136. OCLC 828766756.
- Gleason, Katherine (2012). Alexander McQueen: Evolution. New York City: Race Point Publishing. ISBN 978-1-61058-837-9. OCLC 783147416.
- Grewal, Gwenda-lin (2022). Fashion | Sense: On Philosophy and Fashion. London: Bloomsbury Academic. ISBN 978-1-350-20148-4.
- Honigman, Ana Finel (2021). What Alexander McQueen Can Teach You About Fashion. London: Frances Lincoln. ISBN 978-0-7112-5906-5.
- Thomas, Dana (2015). Gods and Kings: The Rise and Fall of Alexander McQueen and John Galliano. New York City: Penguin Publishing. ISBN 978-1-101-61795-3. OCLC 951153602.
- Watt, Judith (2012). Alexander McQueen: The Life and the Legacy. New York City: Harper Design. ISBN 978-1-84796-085-6. OCLC 892706946.
- Wilcox, Claire, ed. (2015). Alexander McQueen. New York City: Abrams Books. ISBN 978-1-4197-1723-9. OCLC 891618596.
  - Bethune, Kate. "Encyclopedia of Collections". In Wilcox (2015), pp. 303–326.
  - Lodwick, Keith. "Coup de Théâtre". In Wilcox (2015), pp. 247–251.
- Wilson, Andrew (2015). Alexander McQueen: Blood Beneath the Skin. New York City: Simon and Schuster. ISBN 978-1-4767-7674-3. OCLC 1310585849.
- Young, Caroline; Martin, Ann (2017). Tartan + Tweed. London: Frances Lincoln Limited. ISBN 978-0-7112-3822-0. OCLC 947020251.
