= Genes & Development =

- Discipline: Molecular biology, developmental biology, genetics, cell biology
- Language: English
- Edited by: Andrew Dillin

Publication details
- History: 1987–present
- Publisher: Cold Spring Harbor Laboratory Press in association with The Genetics Society (United States)
- Frequency: Biweekly
- Open access: Delayed, after 6 months
- Impact factor: 7.4 (2025)

Standard abbreviations
- ISO 4: Genes Dev.

Indexing
- CODEN: GEDEEP
- ISSN: 0890-9369 (print); 1549-5477 (web)
- LCCN: 91642058
- OCLC no.: 301163874

Links
- Journal homepage; Online access; Online archive

Genes & Development is a peer-reviewed scientific journal covering molecular biology, molecular genetics, cell biology, and development. It was established in 1987 and is published twice monthly by Cold Spring Harbor Laboratory Press in association with The Genetics Society.

According to the Journal Citation Reports, the journal has a 2025 impact factor of 7,4, ranking it 14th out of 181 journals in the category "Cell Biology", third out of 40 journals in the category "Developmental Biology", and 7th out of 158 journals in the category "Genetics & Heredity". Over 1999–2004, the journal was ranked fifth in the "Molecular Biology and Genetics" category according to ScienceWatch, with an average of 47 citations per paper. All issues are available online via the journal website as PDFs, with a text version additionally available from August 1997. Content over 6 months old is freely available.

Since 2025, the current editor-in-chief is Andrew Dillin (University of California, Berkeley), succeeding Terri Grodzicker (Cold Spring Harbor Laboratory), who had served in this role since 1989.
