= Terri Rachals =

American former nurse and suspected serial killer (born 1966)

- Born: Terri Eden Maples Rachals; 1966 (age 59–60); Georgia, U.S.
- Status: Released
- Conviction: Aggravated assault
- Penalty: 17 years imprisonment

Details
- Victims: 0–9+
- Span of crimes: August – December 1985
- Country: U.S.
- State: Georgia
- Date apprehended: March 13, 1986

Terri Eden Maples Rachals is a former nurse from Georgia who was accused of killing people at Phoebe Putney Memorial Hospital in Albany, Georgia, with potassium chloride, a heart-stopping drug. While suspected of killing at least nine of her patients, she was charged with only six murders, three of which she acknowledged possibly committing while in a "fugue state" in a recanted confession that she made to the Georgia Bureau of Investigation.

In 1986, Rachals was guilty on one of twenty aggravated assault charges. She was acquitted of murder. Rachals was sentenced to 17 years in prison and three years of probation. She served her entire sentence, and was released from prison in April 2003.
