= Michael Terry (serial killer) =

American serial killer

- Born: Michael Devern Terry; 1960 (age 65–66); Tallassee, Alabama, U.S.
- Other name: Michael James Potts
- Conviction: Murder x6
- Penalty: Life imprisonment x6

Details
- Victims: 6
- Span of crimes: December 6, 1985 – October 21, 1986
- Country: United States
- State: Georgia
- Date apprehended: November 28, 1986

Michael Devern Terry (born 1960) is an American serial killer active between 1985 and 1986, who killed six gay men in Atlanta, Georgia following sexual encounters. Whilst he claimed they were done in self-defense, Terry was nevertheless convicted and given three life imprisonment terms, which he is still serving.

== Early life ==
Michael Terry was born in 1960, in Tallassee, Alabama. Little is known about his personal life, but after dropping out of the 10th-grade, Terry evidently began committing small crimes, amassing convictions for burglary, robbery, simple battery, aggravated assault and carrying an unlicensed firearm. In 1983, he moved to Atlanta, first staying at a rooming house near Morris Brown College, before asking Gus Jones, a co-worker at the tire company where he was employed, to help him find another location. Jones agreed, finding another rooming house on 664 Kennesaw Avenue, where Terry moved to. While residing there, his neighbors and acquaintances described him as a strange loner who did not mix and carried a gun at all times, even in his own home. Approximately a year before his murder spree, Terry was laid off from work, but found another job at a tire recapping shop in Lithonia.

== Murders ==
As victims, Terry would choose young, black "street hustlers" who frequented the area of the Georgia Baptist Hospital and Martin Luther King Jr. Drive. He would not approach the victims himself, instead leaning on walls or sitting until a suitable target offered their services to him. If the man was to his liking, the pair would go to an isolated area to have sex, right after which Terry would either stab or shoot the victim to death. In five out of the six cases, they were found to be nude from the waist down. In total, he killed six men:

- Richard Williams (24): found in a vacant building behind a house at 867 Mayson Turner Road on December 6, 1985. He had been shot in the back of the head and stabbed twice.
- Curtis Lee Brown (21): found in an isolated part of Dean Rusk Park at 433 Peeples Street on December 14, 1985. He had been shot twice, with one of those shots being in the back of the head.
- Alvin George (31): found in an alleyway near Terry's house on Kennesaw Avenue on March 20, 1986. He had been stabbed multiple times in the neck.
- Jason B. McColley (18): found in the same alleyway as George, on April 6, 1986. Also like the previous victim, he had been stabbed multiple times in the neck.
- George Willingham (30): found in a field near a freeway leading to Stone Mountain on September 13, 1986. He had been shot thrice in the back of the head and had been stabbed twice, and was the only victim to have been mutilated to a degree.
- Daryl O. Williams (20): found in an abandoned apartment building on 849 Harwell Street, not far from the Richard Williams (no relation) crime scene, on October 20, 1986. He had a single gunshot wound to the back of the head.

== Investigation and arrest ==
Initially, all of the cases were considered unrelated and given to different investigators. After some time, however, Detectives Sheila Cumberworth and Marcellus Head noticed a pattern in several cold cases that had occurred in the city, and presented their theory that a serial killer was operating in the area to Lt. Horace Walker, the commander of the local police unit. Walker accepted their suggestions, ordering his team to re-examine the crime scenes and interview potential witnesses, all of whom described seeing an overweight, stocky black male known only as "Mike" as the last man they saw with each respective victim. After further investigation, they came across the name Michael Terry, who turned out to live very closely to the locations where George and McColley's bodies were found. On November 26, 1986, he was arrested without incident at his job in Lithonia by detectives, who charged him with the six murders.

== Trials and imprisonment ==
Shortly after his arrest, Terry admitted to having sex and killing all six victims, but claimed that he had done so in self-defense following arguments over payment. Nevertheless, he was brought to a trial on murder charges, with a jury composed of three men and nine women. At his trial, Terry revoked his previous statement and confession, claiming that he had confessed because the police officers would not believe him either way. Regardless, he was found guilty and convicted in the murders of Richard Williams and Curtis Brown, receiving two consecutive life terms for each.

The following year, Terry was brought to trial for the murder of George Willingham. Despite the efforts of the prosecutors to seek the death penalty, citing the aggravating circumstances in this murder, Justice John Langford imposed a third life term on Terry. In order to avoid further trials, Terry later pled guilty to the remaining murders, for which he was given three additional consecutive life terms. He was then imprisoned, remaining incarcerated as of October 2021.

== See also ==
- List of serial killers in the United States
