= Sheila Terry =

Sheila Terry may refer to:

- Sheila Terry (politician) (born 1950), Irish Fine Gael (formerly Progressive Democrats) politician
- Sheila Terry (actress) (1910–1957), American film actress
