= Justice Terry =

Justice Terry may refer to:

- Charles L. Terry Jr. (1900–1970), associate justice of the Delaware Supreme Court
- David S. Terry (1823–1889), chief justice of the Supreme Court of California
