= Mike Terry =

Mike Terry may refer to:

- Mike Terry (recording engineer)
- Mike Terry (saxophonist)
