= Terry, Pemiscot County, Missouri =

Extinct town in the US state of Missouri

Coordinates: 36°16′36″N 89°45′38″W

Terry is an extinct town in Pemiscot County, in the U.S. state of Missouri. The GNIS classifies it as a populated place.

The community's name is a corruption of the surname of Bill Terrett, an early settler.
