= Sandy Schreier =

American fashion historian

- Born: Sandy Miller; Detroit, Michigan, US
- Education: University of Michigan
- Occupations: Fashion historian and collector
- Known for: World's largest private collector of couture clothing
- Spouse: Sherwin Schreier (died 2014)
- Children: 4

Sandy Schreier is an American fashion historian and collector of couture clothing, with over 15,000 items. She has been called "the world's largest private collector of couture clothing". Her interest in fashion began as a child when she went with her father, a furrier, to the Russeks department store where he worked. She has lent items from her collection to museums around the world but does not reveal where her collection is stored in order not to upset her insurers.

== Early life ==
Schreier was born and raised in Detroit, Michigan, the eldest of three daughters of Edward and Molly Miller. Her father, Edward Miller, was a furrier who worked for Russeks department store. In the 1930s, Russeks relocated him to Detroit when they opened a new store there. Her interest in fashion began as a child going along with her father to Russeks on Saturdays.

She attended the University of Michigan.

== Fashion collector and historian ==
In 2012, Schreier owned about 15,000 items of couture clothing, including "gowns, bags and shoes, muffs, lingerie and even designer sketches". She never wears any of them, but will lend items to museums or show them to designers.

Schreier has lent clothes to exhibitions at museums including the Louvre, the Victoria and Albert Museum, the Hermitage Museum, the Metropolitan Museum of Art, and the Art Institute of Chicago.

Her collection includes three Valentino outfits owned by Jacqueline Kennedy Onassis, the Yves Saint Laurent trouser suit worn by Claudia Cardinale in the 1964 film The Pink Panther and the silver-mesh Roberto Rojas mini worn by Twiggy in a 1967 Richard Avedon photo.

Richard Martin, curator of the Metropolitan Museum of Art's Costume Institute in New York City, has said, "It's the broadest and deepest of any private collection in the world ... it's like a small museum."

The precise location of the warehouse where she stores the clothes is not disclosed, as "her insurance company could get cranky".

In 2019, Schreier made a promised gift of a portion of her collection to the Metropolitan Museum of Art. The promised gifts were featured in The Costume Institute’s 2019 exhibit, In Pursuit of Fashion, The Sandy Schreier Collection. The catalog was written by Andrew Bolton ISBN 978-1-588-39696-9

== Publications ==
Schreier has written two books:

- Hollywood Dressed & Undressed: A Century of Cinema Style. Rizzoli International, New York, 1998. ISBN 9780847821105
- Hollywood Gets Married. Clarkson Potter Publishers, New York, 2002. ISBN 9780609808399

She has an autobiography in preparation which is provisionally titled Desperately Seeking Fashion.

== Personal life ==
She was married to Sherwin Schreier, a lawyer and her "high school sweetheart" who she had been with since she was 13, and they had four children. He died on November 22, 2014, aged 78, from cancer. She is Jewish, and lives in Southfield, Michigan.
