= Terri Grodzicker =

American molecular geneticist and virologist

- Education: Wellesley College, Columbia University
- Organization: Cold Spring Harbor Laboratory

Terri Grodzicker was an American molecular geneticist and virologist who was previously the Dean of Academic Affairs at Cold Spring Harbor Laboratory. Her research was in the field of human Adenoviridae. During her career at Cold Spring Harbor Laboratory she has edited more than a dozen books, and co-authored papers and books with other renown members of the laboratory such as Joseph Sambrook and Bruce Stillman. Grozicker served as the editor-in-chief of Genes & Development from 1989-2025.

== Education ==
Grodzicker received her B.A. in zoology in 1963 from Wellesley College. She then completed a Master of Science and a PhD in Biology from Columbia University. During her time at Columbia she was a President's Fellow.

== Research and career ==
Immediately after her PhD, Grodzicker received an NIH postdoctoral fellowship and joined Harvard's department of microbiology and molecular genetics, where she worked with Jon Beckwith, focusing on the lactose operon E. coli.
