= Terrine =

Terrine may refer to:

- Terrine (cookware), a vessel for cooking a forcemeat loaf
- Terrine (food), a forcemeat similar to pâté
