= Chris Terry =

Chris Terry may refer to:

- Chris Terry (American football) (born 1975), American football offensive tackle
- Chris Terry (ice hockey) (born 1989), Canadian professional ice hockey player
