= Teri =

Teri is a given name directly from Teresa. Notable people with the name include:

- Teri Ann Linn (born 1961), American actress and singer
- Teri Anulewicz (born 1976), American politician
- Teri Austin (born 1957), Canadian actress
- Teri Byrne (born 1972), American fitness competitor
- Teri Clemens, retired American volleyball coach
- Teri Copley (born 1961), American actress
- Teri DeSario (born 1951), American singer and songwriter
- Teri Garr (1944–2024), American actress
- Teri Greeves (born 1970), Native American beadwork artist
- Teri Harrison (born 1981), American model
- Teri Hatcher (born 1964), American actress
- Teri Holbrook, American mystery writer
- Teri Hope, (1938–2023), American model and actress
- Teri Lake (born 1972), Canadian curler
- Teri McKeever (born 1962), American college and Olympic swimming coach
- Teri McMinn (born 1951), American actress
- Teri Moïse (born 1970), American singer
- Teri Peterson, (born 1959), American former Playboy playmate
- Teri Polo (born 1969), American actress
- Teri Shields (1933–2012), American actress, film producer, socialite, and former model
- Teri Steer-Cantwell (born 1975), American shot putter
- Teri Sue Wood (born 1965), American comic artist
- Teri Takai, Assistant Secretary of Defense for Networks and Information Integration and the Chief Information Officer for the United States Department of Defense (2010-)
- Teri Thornton (1934–2000), American jazz singer
- Teri Tordai, Hungarian actress
- Teri Weigel (born 1962), American former Playboy playmate

== Fictional characters ==
- Teri Bauer, fictional character in the television series 24
- Teri Hillman, fictional character in the comic series Peter Parker
- Teri Joseph, fictional character in the television series Soul Food
- Terri Webber Arnett, fictional character in the television series General Hospital

== See also ==
- Terri
- Terry (disambiguation)
- Teri language alternative name for Sagalla language
