= P. S. Terry =

American politician

Member of the Missouri Senate from the 26th district
- In office 1927–1935

Personal details
- Born: August 1, 1876 Greene County, Missouri, US
- Died: June 11, 1936 (aged 59) Jefferson, Missouri, US
- Party: Republican
- Spouse: Lucy A. Noce
- Children: 1 son
- Occupation: politician, attorney

Philip Samson Terry (August 1, 1876 – June 11, 1936) was an American politician who served in the Missouri Senate between 1927 and 1935. He previously served as mayor of Festus, Missouri, from 1913 to 1917. Terry was educated in public school.
