= Terri Witek =

American poet

- Born: Therese Ann Damm Sandusky, Ohio, U.S.
- Occupation: Poet
- Education: Vanderbilt University (PhD)
- Spouse: Joseph Witek

Website
- terriwitek.com

Terri Witek (born Therese Ann Damm in Sandusky, Ohio, United States) is an American poet.

== Biography ==
Witek holds a Ph.D. from Vanderbilt University and, in addition to teaching Poetry in the Expanded Field in the graduate program, directs the undergraduate Sullivan Creative Writing Program at Stetson University in DeLand, Florida, where she holds the Art & Melissa Sullivan Chair in Creative Writing.

Her collections include The Rape Kit (2018–winner of the Slope Editions Prize), "Body Switch" (2016) "Exit Island" (2012), The Shipwreck Dress (2008), Carnal World (2006); Fools and Crows (2003); and Courting Couples (2000), a Center for Book Arts Prize winner, She is also the author of Robert Lowell and Life Studies: Revising the Self. She has published poems in many journals, including the American Poetry Review, Poetry, The New Republic, and Slate, and created both site-specific and ephemeral work for social media and performance.

Witek teaches poetry and poetics, especially at the place where these cross over into other media. Throughout her career she has worked with visual artists, and the reverberations between mediums is explored in much of her work. Her collaborations with Brazilian visual artist Cyriaco Lopes (cyriacolopes.com) include solo shows at Oi, Futuro (Flamengo) in Rio de Janeiro (2017), the Crisp Ellert Museum (2014), The Blue Gallery in Chania, Greece (2014), the Hand Art Center (2012), the Markland House Museum (2010), and the Faulconer Gallery (2010), and they also participated in group shows at the Chosunilbo Museum, Korea (2014), Art in Odd Places, New York City (2012), and Contemporary Flanerie: Reconfiguring Cities, Oakland University Gallery, Michigan (2009). Their performances have been seen at the Academia das Sciencias and Centro Nacional de Cultura, Lisbon, Portugal (2016, 2015, 2014), the Philadelphia Academy of Fine Arts (2016) The Salford Museum, Greater Manchester, England (2013), and Recession Art, NYC, (2012). Witek and Lopes team-teach Poetry in the Expanded Field in Stetson University's low residency MFA of the Americas and run "The Fernando Pessoa Game" at Disquiet International. New media artist Matt Roberts (mattroberts.com) and Witek have collaborated on interactive smart phone projects that have likewise been featured both nationally and internationally.

She is married to the comic book scholar Joseph Witek.

== Awards ==
- 2018, Slope Editions Prize
- 2000, Center for Book Arts Prize
- In 2000, she received the McInery Award for Teaching, and in 2008, she received the John Hague Teaching Award for outstanding teaching in the liberal arts and sciences.
