= Terrie Pickerill =

American political strategist

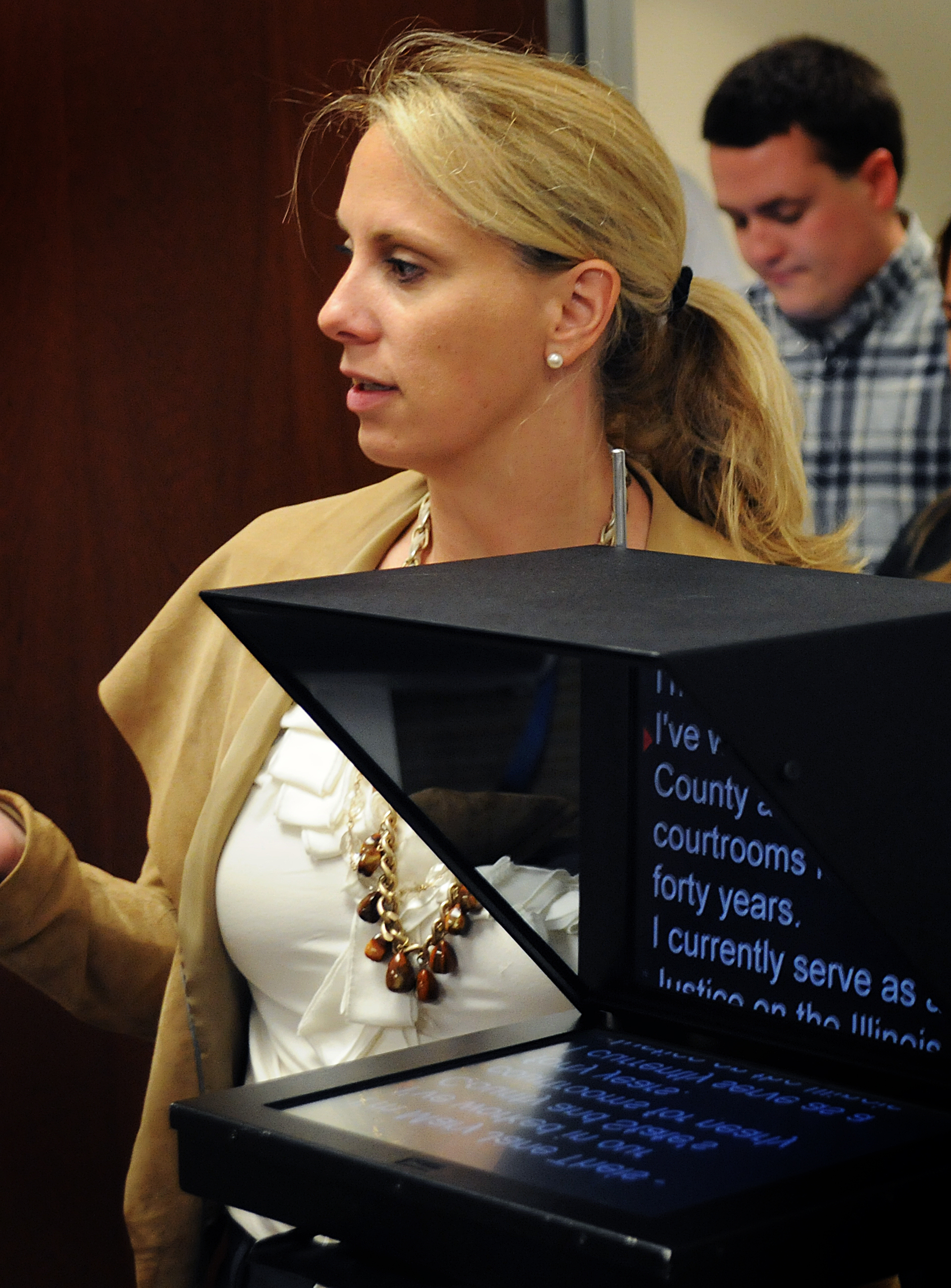
Terrie Pickerill, on set in 2011

Terrie Pickerill is a Democratic political strategist and co-founder and managing partner of SnyderPickerill Media Group, a Chicago-based media firm specializing in the production of political television advertising for state and national political campaigns and candidates.

== Career ==
Pickerill began her career as a coordinator for the Netsch for Governor campaign in 1994, where she recruited and managed volunteers and helped create and implement the statewide field program. She then worked for the Illinois Comptroller's office, where she created a comprehensive database for the state’s local governments and a paperless filing system.

Prior to founding SP Media Group in 2010 with fellow political consultant Ken Snyder, Pickerill was Senior Vice President at AKPD Message and Media (formerly Axelrod and Associates).

In 2001, Pickerill was chosen as a member of the inaugural class of the Illinois Women’s Institute for Leadership.

== Personal life ==
Pickerill resides in Illinois with her partner and two children.
