= Organza =

Fabric made from silk or synthetics

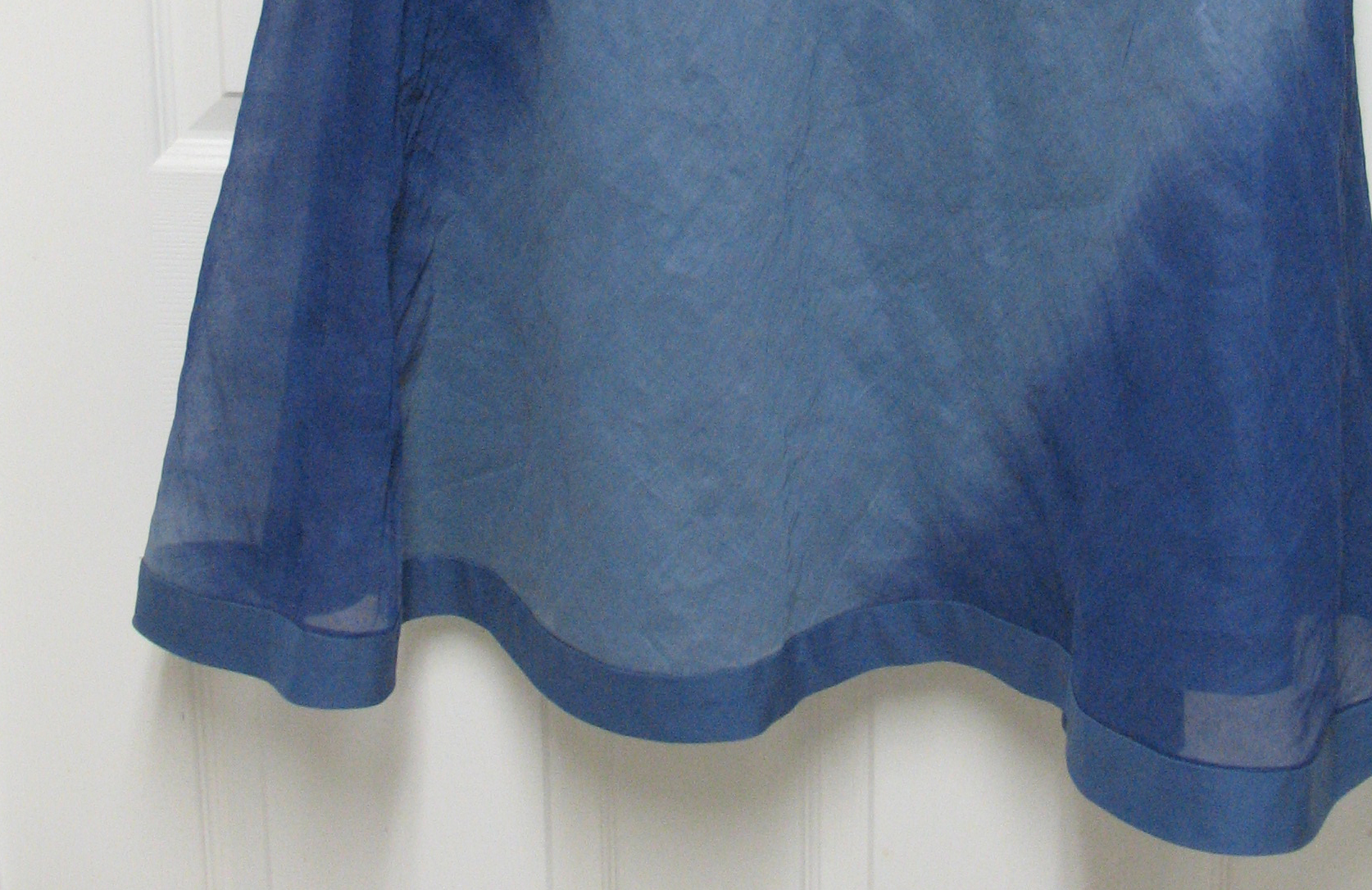
Skirt made from organza

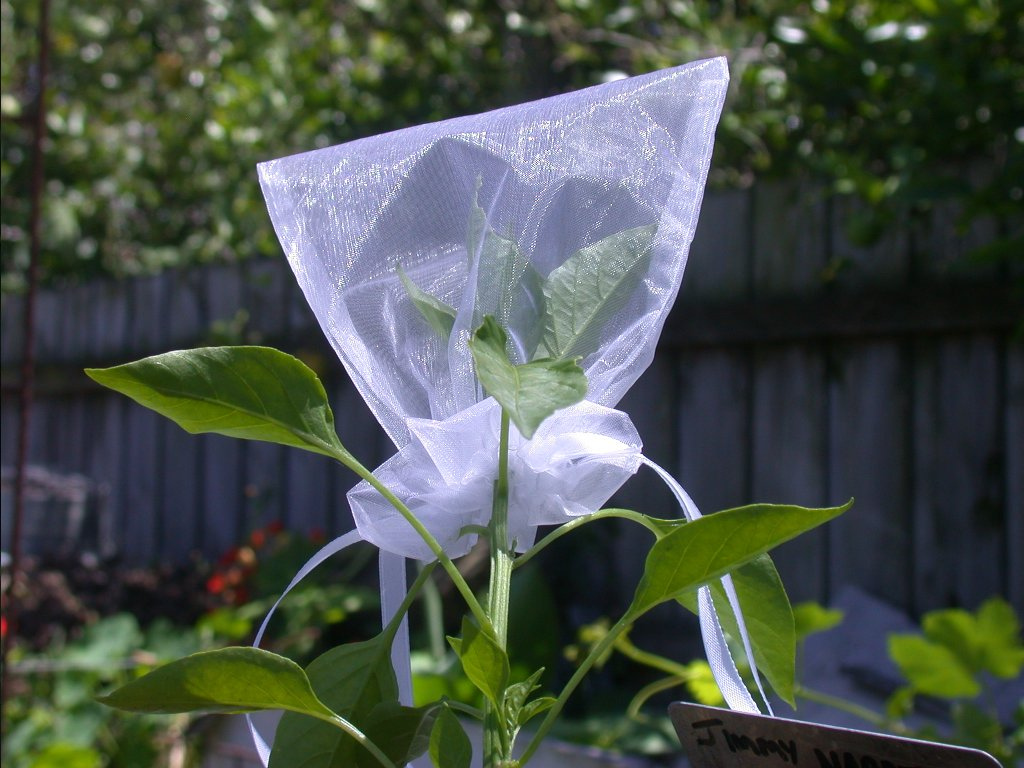
Organza bag protecting a plant.

Organza is a thin, plain weave, sheer fabric traditionally made from silk. Many modern organzas are woven with synthetic filament fibers such as polyester or nylon. Silk organza is woven by a number of mills along the Yangtze River and in the province of Zhejiang in China. A coarser silk organza is woven in the Bangalore area of India. Deluxe silk organzas are woven in France and Italy. Organza is distinguished by its crisp hand, stiffness relative to weight, and slippery surface texture.

The term may derive from French organsin, ultimately from the Central Asian city of Urgench, the midpoint of the Northern Silk Road.

== See also ==
- Gauze
- Organdy
- Tulle (netting), another type of sheer fabric
