= Terence (given name) =

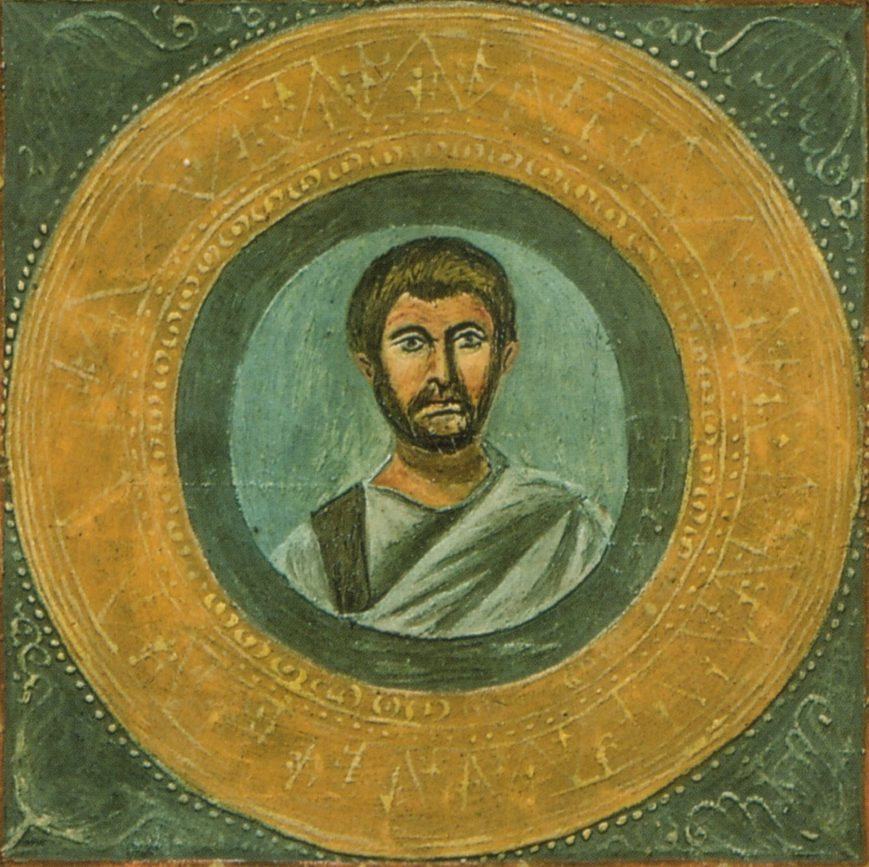
- Gender: Male
- Language: Latin

Other names
- Nickname: Terry
- Related names: Terentius, Terrance

Terence is a masculine given name, derived from the Latin name Terentius. The diminutive form is Terry. Spelling variants include Terrence, Terrance, Terance and (in Scotland) Torrance.

== Notable people with this name ==
- Terence (c. 195/185 – c. 159 BC), Latin playwright
- Saint Terence, several people
- Geezer Butler (born Terence Butler in 1949), British musician of Black Sabbath fame
- Terence Atmane (born 2002), French tennis player
- Terry Callier (1945–2012), American jazz and folk singer and guitarist
- Terence Chang, Hong Kong and American film producer
- Terence Crawford (born 1987), American boxer
- Terence Trent D'Arby (born 1962), American singer and songwriter
- Terry A. Davis (1969–2018), American programmer, developer of TempleOS
- Terence Davies (1945–2023), English film director and screenwriter
- Terrence Deyalsingh, Trinidad and Tobago politician
- Terence Dials (b. 1983), American basketball player
- Terry Fox (1958–1981), Canadian athlete, humanitarian, and cancer research activist
- Terence Garvin (b. 1991), American football player
- Terrence Giddy, known as Terry Giddy (1950–2023), Australian Paralympic athlete
- Torry Gillick (1915–1971), Scottish footballer
- Terence Hill, Italian actor
- Terrence Hodson (died 2004), Australian murder victim
- Terrence Howard, American actor and singer
- Terrence Hughes, American professional wrestler
- Terrence Jenkins, American actor, TV personality, and model
- Terence Kelly, many people
- Terry Labonte (born 1956), American race car driver
- Terence Lam (born 1991), Hong Kong composer, singer-songwriter, and record producer
- Terrence Magee, American football player
- Terrence Malick, American filmmaker
- Terence MacSwiney (1879–1920), Lord Mayor of Cork who died on hunger strike during the Irish War of Independence
- Terry McAuliffe, American politician and businessman
- Terence McKenna, American writer and philosopher
- Terence McKenna (film producer), Canadian film producer
- Terence Millin (1903–1980), Irish surgeon
- Terence Frederick Mitchell (1919–2007), British linguist
- Terence Morris (born 1979), NBA and Israel Basketball Premier League basketball player
- Terence Newman, American football player
- Terrence O'Connor, Canadian judge
- Terence O'Loghlin (1764–1843), Irish soldier of the British Army
- Terence O'Neill, Ulster Unionist politician, Prime Minister of Northern Ireland
- Terence Parkin, deaf South African swimmer and the most decorated Deaflympic athlete in history
- Terry Pratchett (1948–2015), English author
- Terence Ranger, (1929–2015) British historian of Africa
- Terence Rattigan (1911–1977), British dramatist
- Terrence Romeo (born 1992), Filipino basketball player
- Terence Sanders (1901–1985), British rower
- Terrence Shannon Jr. (born 2000), American basketball player
- Terence Siufay (born 1976), Macanese singer and actor
- Terence Smith (disambiguation), several people
- Terence Stamp (1938–2025), British actor
- Terence Steele (born 1997), American football player
- Terence Tao (born 1975), Australian mathematician, winner of a Fields Medal
- Terrence Trammell (born 1978), American track and field athlete
- Terence Tse, educator, speaker, advisor and commentator
- Terrence Watson (born 1987), American-Israeli basketball player
- T. H. White (1906–1964), English author
- Terrence Wilcutt, American astronaut
- Terence Winter, American television and film writer
- Terence Wilson, also known as Astro, former British singer and member of British band UB40
- Terence Yin (born 1975), Hong Kong film actor, singer, producer, and media relations specialist
- Terence Young (director), British film director
- Terence Young (politician) (born 1952), Canadian politician
- Terence Yung, American classical pianist

== Fictional characters ==
- Terence (EastEnders), a fictional dog
- Terence or Terrence (Terry) Granchester (or Grandchester), male character in Candy Candy (manga, anime and Final Story)
- Terence the Tractor in The Railway Series and Thomas and Friends
- Terence, the large red bird from the Angry Birds video game series
- Terence, a pixie dust sparrow-man from Disney Fairies
- Terence, a bath toy crocodile in Rubbadubbers
- Terence (Terry) Morris, a character in the X-Files TV series, episodes "Dreamland" and "Dreamland II"
- Terence Fletcher, the main antagonist of the 2014 film Whiplash
- Terrance "Terry" Silver, antagonist of The Karate Kid Part III and later Cobra Kai.
- Sir Terrance Henry Stoot, one half of Terrance and Phillip, a duo of characters in the animated TV series, South Park
- Terrence (Terry) McGinnis, the main character of Batman Beyond
- Terrence, Mac's older brother, in Foster's Home for Imaginary Friends
- Terrence "Terry" Jeffords, a sergeant in the 99th precinct in Brooklyn Nine Nine

== See also ==
- Terance, given name
- Terrance, given name
