= Antonio del Massaro =

Italian painter

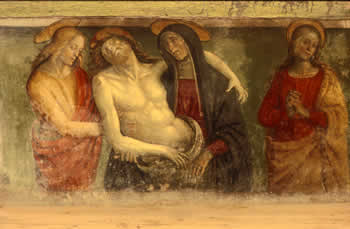
Il Pastura's Deposizione (Descent from the Cross), Canino, Viterbo, Church of San Francesco.

Antonio del Massaro da Viterbo, or Antonio da Viterbo, nicknamed il Pastura (c. 1450–1516) was an Italian painter.

== Life and career ==
The earliest mention of Il Pastura occurs in December 1478, when the artist participated in the establishment of the Foundation of Art and the University of San Luca dei Pittori, in Rome. Il Pastura may have lived in Rome for some time before this event, although the details of his career in Rome are uncertain. However, Il Pastura certainly participated in decorating some work by Pinturicchio in the rooms of the Borgia Apartment in the Vatican. In Viterbo, Il Pastura painted the Presepio con i Santi Giovanni Battista e Bartolomeo (Nativity Scene with Saints John the Baptist and Bartholomew now in the Museo Civico of Viterbo.

After that, he travelled to Orvieto, where it is documented that between 1497 and 1499 he completed the restoration of frescoes originally painted by Ugolino di Prete Ilario for the cathedral, work which had been started by Pinturicchio. For that Cathedral, Il Pastura worked on pieces that featured Biblical scenes such as the Annunciation, Visitation, Presentation to the Temple, and Flight into Egypt. He returned to Viterbo in 1504 and painted a piece called San Terenziano, San Rocco e San Sebastiano (Saint Terence, Saint Roch, and Saint Sebastian), which was probably influenced by the work of Luca Signorelli. It is conserved in the church of Santa Maria a Capranica.

After the death of Lorenzo da Viterbo, Il Pastura became the most important Viterbese painter of the time. He created frescoes in Viterbo such as Santi Giovanni Battista, Girolamo e Lorenzo (Saints John the Baptist, James, and Lawrence) for the baptistery of Santa Maria Nuova, which was possibly influenced by the work of Antoniazzo Romano and Perugino. He also decorated the aedicule for the courtyard of the Chigi Palace with a Madonna and Child. Other important works, executed between 1508 and 1509, include the decoration of the chancel of the cathedral of Tarquinia, which was commissioned by the Vitelleschi family.

== Critical reception ==
The Italian scholar Italo Faldi has observed the success with critics that Il Pastura's work has enjoyed. Even though Giorgio Vasari did not include Il Pastura's name in his Lives of the Most Excellent Painters, Sculptors, and Architects, Il Pastura's reputation benefited from a resurgence of interest in his work in the 19th century. One of the first monographs on an Italian painter was one written on Il Pastura, in 1901, by E. Steinmann.

== Works ==
- Italy
  - Madonna in trono con Bambino benedicente tra santi, Amelia, Italy
  - Deposizione, Cristo in pietà con gli strumenti della passione, Canino, church of San Francesco
  - San Rocco, San Terenziano e San Sebastiano, Capranica, church of Santa Maria
  - Madonna con Bambino in un paesaggio, Naples, private collection (1926)
  - Coppie di angeli reggenti lo stemma del Duomo, Orvieto, Cathedral of Orvieto
  - Presentazione al Tempio, Annunciazione, Visitazione, Orvieto, Cathedral of Orvieto (chancel)
  - Madonna con Bambino in trono, Orvieto, Museo dell'Opera del Duomo
  - San Sebastiano e donatore, Orvieto, Museo dell'Opera del Duomo
  - Affresco con Santi, Orvieto, church of Santissima Trinità
  - Madonna con Bambino in trono tra Santi, Rome, San Cosimato
  - Madonna col Bambino, Rome, Pinacoteca Capitolina
  - Sacra Famiglia con San Giovannino in adorazione del Bambino, Rome, collezione Rospigliosi
  - Madonna con Bambino tra Santi, Rome, private collection of Principe Massimo
  - Madonna con Bambino benedicente, Rome, private collection
  - Madonna del Latte in trono, Tarquinia, Museo Nazionale
  - Affreschi, Tarquinia, cathedral
  - Madonna con Bambino benedicente tra Santi, Terni, Pinacoteca comunale
  - Madonna con Bambino incoronata da angeli in una mandorla di cherubini, Tuscania (VT), chiesa di Santa Maria del Riposo
  - Madonna con Bambino benedicente in una mandorla di cherubini, Vercelli, Museo Borgogna (già Roma, collezione principe Orsini)
  - Affreschi, Viterbo, Museo civico (dalla chiesa di San Domenico)
  - Natività, adorazione dei pastori con Santi, Viterbo, Museo civico
  - Stendardo processionale, Viterbo, Museo civico (associated with church of San Clemente)
  - Madonna con Bambino in trono e angeli tra Santi, Viterbo, Museo civico (associated with church of Santa Maria del Paradiso)
  - Orazione nell'orto, Viterbo, Museo civico
  - Edicola affrescata, Viterbo, Palazzo Chigi (Cortile)
  - San Rocco e donatore, Viterbo, church of Sant'Angelo in Spatha
  - Affresco, Viterbo, church of Santa Maria Nuova
  - Affreschi votivi, Viterbo, church of Santa Maria della Peste
- France
  - Madonna del Latte tra Santi, Grenoble, Musée des beaux-arts
  - Madonna con Bambino benedicente in un paesaggio, Paris, Collection of Comte D'Hautpoul
- Liechtenstein
  - Madonna con Bambino, due angeli e San Giovannino, Vaduz, Galleria Liechtenstein
- Switzerland
  - Madonna con Bambino, Lugano, Bruno Scardeoni Collection (1975)
- United States
  - Morte di Cristo con Maria e San Giovanni, Atlanta, Georgia, High Museum of Art
  - Annunciazione, Boston, Museum of Fine Arts
  - Madonna in trono con Bambino benedicente in un paesaggio, Cambridge (Massachusetts), Fogg Art Museum of Harvard University
  - Madonna con Bambino in trono tra Santi, Philadelphia (Pennsylvania), Museum of Art, John G. Johnson Collection
  - Madonna con Bambino e due angeli, New York, Finch College
  - Madonna con Bambino ed i Santi Girolamo e Francesco, New York, Metropolitan Museum of Art
  - Madonna con Bambino in un paesaggio, Sarasota, Florida, Ringling Museum of Art
  - Madonna e due angeli in adorazione del Bambino, Worcester (Massachusetts), Art Museum
- Vatican City
  - Allegoria della Retorica, della Musica e della Astrologia, Appartamento Borgia (The Room of the Liberal Arts)
  - Resurrezione, Pentecoste, Assunzione della Vergine, Angeli reggenti lo stemma di Papa Alessandro VI, Appartamento Borgia (sala dei Misteri), as a collaborator with Pinturicchio

== Sources ==
- T. Verdon (editor), Gesù. Il corpo, il volto nell’arte, Cinisello Balsamo, 2010, p. 200
- A. M. Ghisalberti, Dizionario Bibliografico degli Italiani, Rome 2004, p. 583
- K. J. P. Lowe, Nuns' Chronicles and Convent Culture in Renaissance and Counter-Reformation Italy, Cambridge 2003, pp. 334–337
- A. Schivi, Le Collezioni del museo, in C. Lacchia and A. Schiavi (editors), Museo Borgogna. Storia e Collezioni, Cologno Monzese 2001, p. 32
- K. Lagemann, Spätgotische Malerei in Latium: Stilkritische Analyse und Katalog, Munster-Hamburg-London 2000, pp. 20–24
- M. Clayton, Raphael and His Circle: Drawings from Windsor Castle, London 1999, p. 40
- L. M. Galli Michero, Il Museo Borgogna a Vercelli. Guida alle Collezioni, Turin 1999, p. s.n.
- J. Turner, Dictionary of Art, New York 1996, p. 817
- F. Todini, La Pittura Umbra. Dal Duecento al primo Cinquecento, Milan 1989, vol. I, pp. 258–260, vol. II, pp. 537–541
- F. Zeri, editor, La Pittura in Italia. Il Quattrocento, Milan 1987, tomo II, pp. 728–729
- A. Zuccari, L'attività viterbese di Antonio del Massaro detto il Pastura, in Il Quattrocento a Viterbo, Viterbo, Museo Civico, catalogue of exhibition, Rome 1983, pp. 222–239
- L. Berandi, Il Civico Museo Borgogna Vercelli, Vercelli 1982, p. 102
- P. Mattiangeli, Annio da Viterbo, ispiratore dei cicli pittorici. Documenti e ricerche, Rome 1981
- A. Venturi, Storia dell'Arte Italiana, Milan 1975, p. 582
- I. Faldi, Pittori Viterbesi di cinque secoli, Rome 1970, pp. 38–45
- V. Viale, Civico Museo Francesco Borgogna Vercelli. I dipinti, Vercelli 1969, p. 67, n. 96
- V. Golzio, G. Zander, L'arte in Roma nel XV secolo, Bologna 1968, pp. 252, 265–266, 290, 303
- L. Mortari, Il Museo Diocesano di Orte, Viterbo 1967, pp. 21–23
- M. Pepe, "L'attività romana di Antonio da Viterbo", in Capitolium, November 1964, pp. 558–562
- I. Faldi, Museo Civico di Viterbo. Dipinti e sculture dal Medioevo al XVIII secolo, Viterbo 1955, pp- 15, 19–21
- I. Faldi, L. Mortari, La pittura viterbese dal XIV al XVI secolo, catalogue of exhibition, Viterbo 1954
- B. Berenson, Italian Pictures of the Renaissance, Oxford 1953, pp. 321–332
- L. Bohling, Zeitschrift für Kunstgeschichte, in Prinzipielles zum deutschen Parallelfaltenstil, VII, 1938, pp. 20–40
- M. Gabbrielli, Il Museo Civico di Viterbo, in Ministero dell'educazione nazionale. Direzione generale delle antichità e belle arti, Roma 1932, pp. 16–17,33
- V. Viale, Guida alle raccolte dei musei Leone e Borgogna di Vercelli, Vercelli 1934, p. 82
- U. Gnoli, Pittori e miniatori dell'Umbria, Spoleto 1923 (rist. an. 1980), pp. 35–36
- U. Gnoli, in Art in America, IX, 1920, p. 24
- C. Ricci, Antonio da Viterbo detto il Pastura e l'Appartamento Borgia, in Per l'inaugurazione del Museo Civico di Viterbo, Viterbo 1912, pp. 23–27
- C. Pinzi, Memorie sulla chiesa di Santa Maria della Verità, in Per l'inaugurazione del Museo Civico di Viterbo, Viterbo 1912, pp. 10–12
- C. Pinzi, I principali monumenti di Viterbo, Viterbo 1911, pp. 183–192
- E. Steinmann, Antonio da Viterbo, Munich 1901
- Catalogue des Objets d'Art et d'Ameublement garnissant le grand appartement au premier étage du Palais du prince Orsini Roma, catalogo d'asta (Roma, 12 – 23 marzo 1896), Rome 1896, p. 58, n. 421
- E. Muntz, Lea arts à la cour des papes, Paris 1889, p. 99, p. 190 nota
- E. Muntz, Lea arts à la cour des papes, Paris 1882, p. 99
- C. Pinzi, Gli ospizi medievali e l'ospedale grande di Viterbo, Viterbo 1893, pp. 129–130
- L. Fiumi, Il duomo di Orvieto, Rome 1866, pp. 299–305
