= Longhi (surname) =

Italian surname

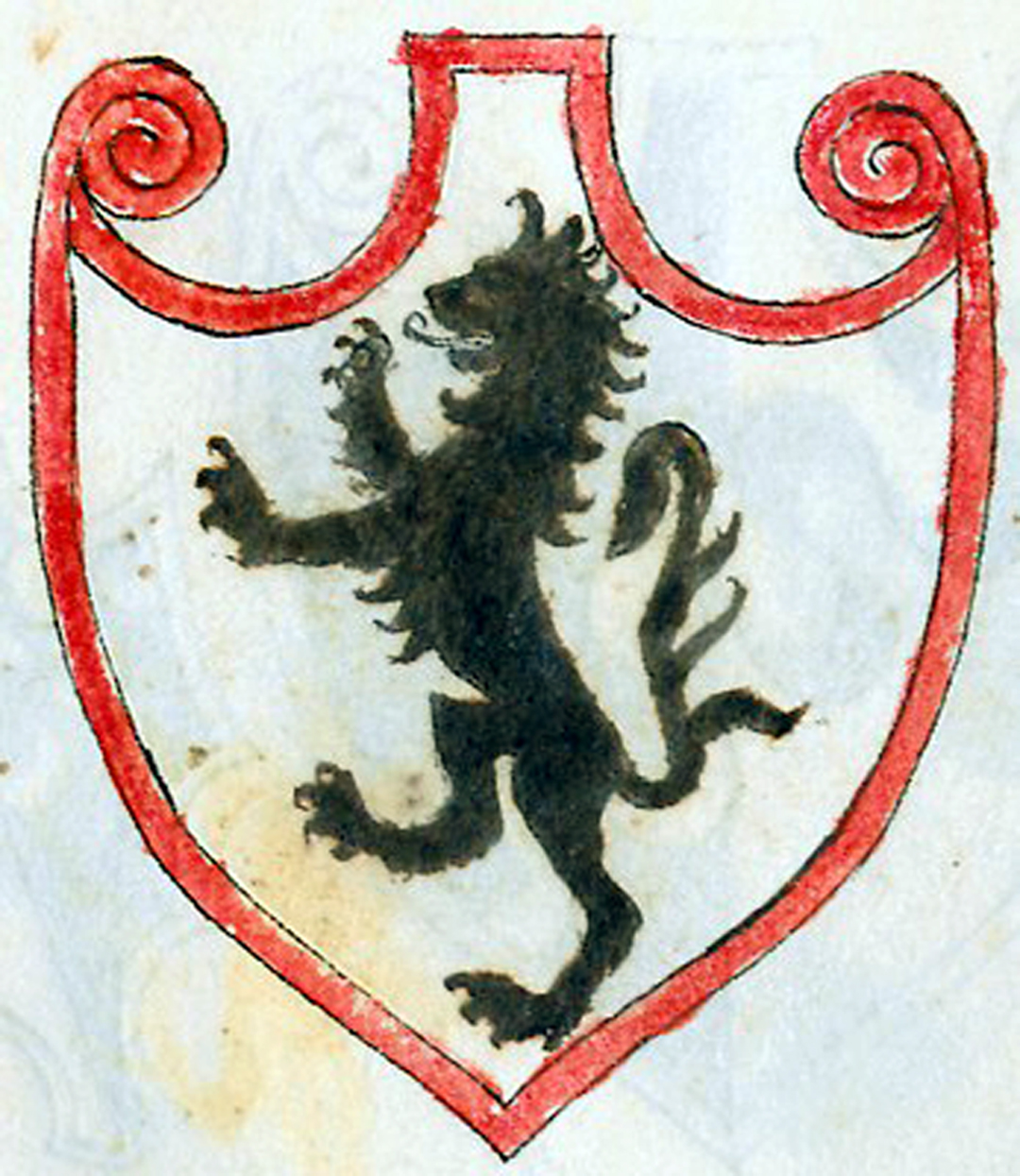
One of the oldest coats of arms associated with the surname, belonging to the counts Ugoni-Longhi: Black rampant lion on a silver field, which had prolific descent in the Italian armorial, being one of the emblems most constantly associated with the surname among noble groups. From the manuscript Famiglie venete con le loro armi, 17th century.

Longhi (Italian pronunciation: [ˈloŋɡi]) is an Italian surname of ancient origin, initially spelled as Longo ([ˈloŋɡo]), of which Longhi is plural. Some groups gained great power in the Middle Ages and into the modern era, holding dozens of titles of nobility and vast estates in north-central Italy. The surname appears in many dialectal variants, such as Longis, Longoni, Longa, Longhù, Longi, Longu and others. In addition to the Longus, the plural Longi is usually found in Latin texts. However, since in Italian longo means "long", "tall", "ancient" or "long", and is a word of common usage, it is likely that many of the numerous groups scattered throughout Italy had independent origins.

== Ancient Rome ==
The word appeared as a denominator of persons since Ancient Rome, arising in a branch of the Sempronia gens, the Long Semprons. Two of their representatives were consuls, the highest magistracy in the period of the Roman Republic, cited by Livy, Tacitus, and Polybius.

Another gens also used the Longo name in Rome, the Atilia gens, which had 19 consuls as well as patrician and plebeian branches. Athilius, one of the first three consular tribunes, elected in 444 B.C., Sulpitius and Duilio, who held the same office respectively in 390 and 339 B.C., are notable individuals. Mussidius Longo, proconsul, issued several coins soon after Julius Caesar's death. In the time of Mark Antony, Julius Longo issued coins. Lucilius, a senator, was a close friend of Tiberius (r. 14–37) and accompanied him in his exile. The Atilia gens flourished at least until the second century.

In the Middle Ages, the surname appears in various parts of Italy, however, without any assured connection between them.

== Venice ==
According to tradition, at the decay of the Roman Empire, Luca Longo, magister equitum, of obscure origin, in the year 560, began to connect the islands of Venice with bridges, erecting buildings and temples, but his tracks were subsequently lost, although it is claimed that he was the origin of some tribunes and then of a patrician lineage. There is no documentary proof, being likely an onomastic coincidence that the next people who appear, five centuries later, are effectively in the patriciate.

In Venice, they reappeared in 1053, when Ursa, widow of Petrus Longus, donated a vineyard to the Dominicans on the island of Chioggia. In the 12th century, Jacopo is mentioned as admiral, a position traditionally attributed to the patriciate, and Benedict, Dominic, and John appear signing state documents together with other patricians and the doge. In 1268, Gerard was the supreme commander of the armies of the city, and in 1272 he was part of the embassy sent to Bologna. They were excluded from the patriciate in 1297, being reinstated in 1380 in recognition of their contribution to the war against Genoa, and confirmed as nobles in the 19th century.

In the 16th century, the patricians Francesco and his son Antonio were on the Council of Ten; the son left an important account of the war against the Turks, and a grandson was a secret counselor. Several others became known as warriors, writers, clerks, politicians. Many were podestà in Venetian cities and territories, such as Taddeo, Francesco, Antonio, Claudio, Vincenzo, and Nicolò; podestàs of Vicenza, Verona, Brescia, Martinengo, the Imagna valley, the Seriana valley, and Asola. In Venice, of note is also Laura, a "virtuous lady" and wife of the powerful Bergamo nobleman Gian Girolamo Albani, an official in Venice and cardinal after he became a widower. She descended from Abbondio Longhi, lord of the Castle of Urgnano and secretary to Bartolomeo Colleoni, celebrated condottiero.

== Brescia ==
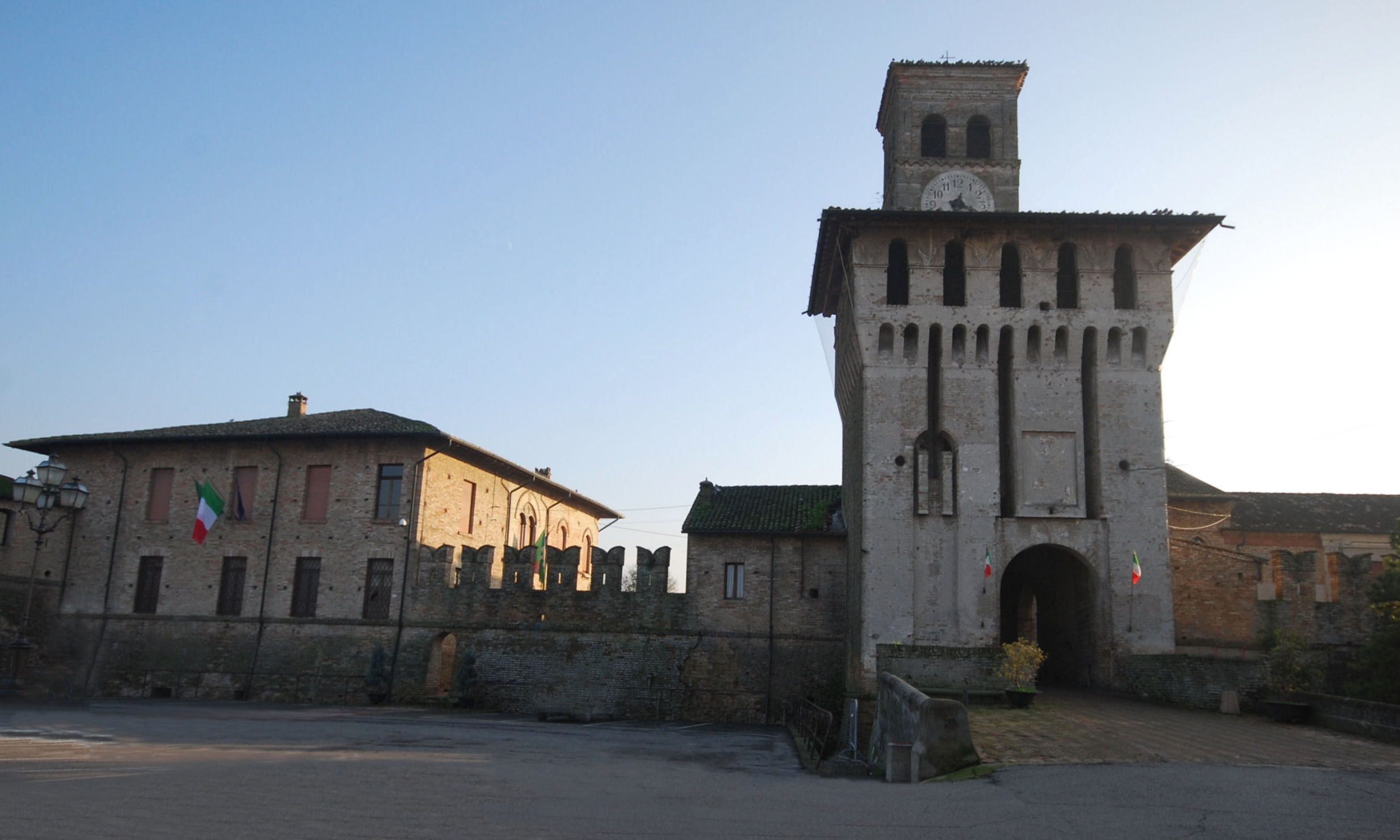
Redondesco Castle, of the counts of the same name

The most notable medieval group is that formed by the Ugoni-Longhi counts or Ugonidi. Tradition claims they descended from the Long Semprons of Ancient Rome, but there is no documentary proof.

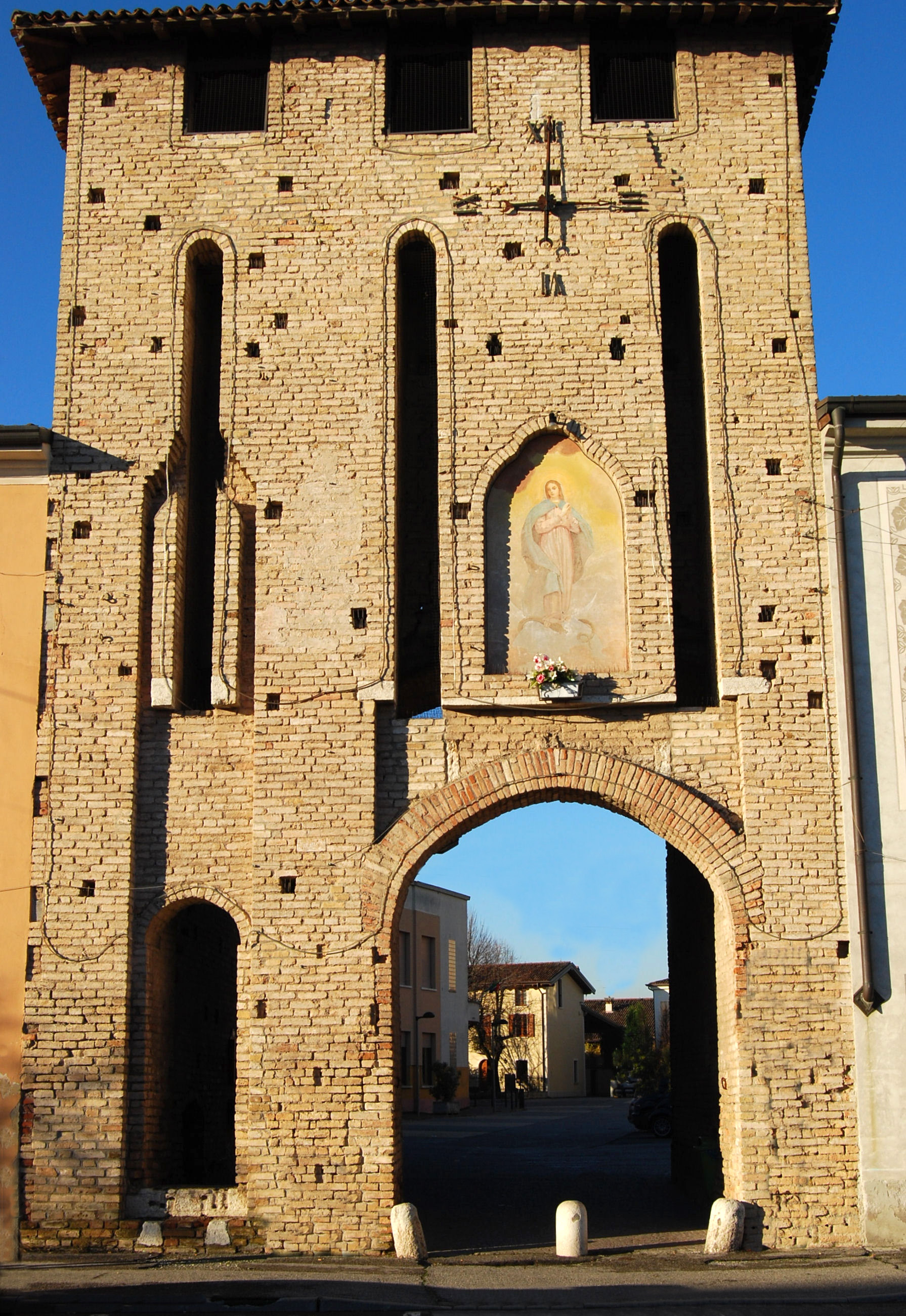
The surviving tower of Remedello Castle

According to Marchetti-Longhi, this is "an ancient feudal family of Lombard origin, scattered in Lombardy, Liguria, and Veneto, and then rooted also in Rome. [...] The origin of these counts is rather obscure and controversial, but they claimed to have been invested of the County of Brescia at the end of 974 by Otto II." Their most immediate roots probably lie in Ugo, who in 1085 inherited the County of Sabioneta from his father, Boson II, and pass his name onto his offspring. His wife was Matilde, daughter of the counts Arduini of Parma. The first record of the surname in this region, dated 1167, cites Narisio, Vizzolo, and Azzo Longhi as counts of Montichiari, Asola, and Mosio. The testimonies of Andrione of Redondesco, along with others in a court case of 1228, confirm the consanguinity of the Longhi with the Ugonids:

"You remember that more than 50 years ago the counts of Casa Ugonidi and those who are here [the counts Longhi of Montichiari, then under trial], and their fathers, and their predecessors, said and called themselves counts of Montichiari. [...] and that Montichiari was the head of the House."

However, the links of this connection are not cited: The documentation on the Ugonids, in general, is poor and unclear, and there are several hypotheses circulating about the origin and descent of this strain, very branched and associated with many other important Houses, which flourished with great power between the 10th and 12th centuries but almost always involved in disputes, wars and exchanges of territories. They incorporated several other count titles, such as Desenzano, Marcaria, Bizzolano, Redondesco, Casaloldo, San Martino Gusnago, Ceresino, and Belforte, among several other fiefs, which formed a vast latifundium. They founded a monastery and owned several castles, some of which still exist.

A rare case in the world of medieval nobility, the Longhi appear at a very early date already established with a surname that is not derived from a toponym. However, soon some branches, to differentiate themselves, returned to the ancient practice of adopting the name of the localities where they had fiefdoms, following the example of the Casalodi (or Casaloldi), possibly the most powerful of all these derivative branches.

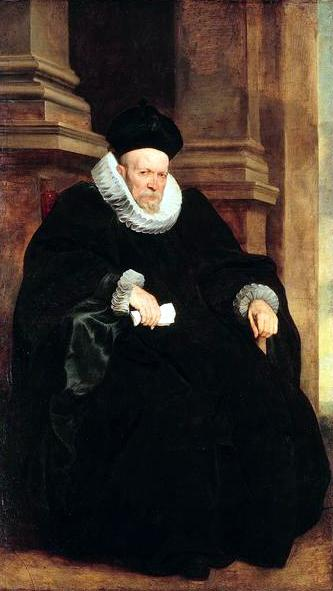
Alessandro Giustiniani Longo, doge of Genoa

The Ugonids, in the 13th century, facing the communes that were strengthening and fighting the power of the feudal lords, were deprived of numerous fiefs and castles and ended up banished from several cities, such as Brescia and Mantua, their main strongholds, and headquarters of some of the most important branches. They took refuge in the surrounding area and sought new alliances with the counts of Plasencia and Verona, the Palatine counts of Lomello, and the Obertenghi marquises. From there a dispersion began, "some retaining, others losing feudal titles and power, but always retaining their gentile name and the memory of their common origin in the fundamental identity of their family: The rampant lion", as Marchetti pointed out. Even before the decay, it had been a clan with a strong expansionist policy. They radiated westward as far as Bergamo, where the family gained power, especially after William of Longis, previously chancellor to the king of Naples, was appointed cardinal by Celestine V. The family's power was to be exercised by the king of Naples.

There some adopted the name Alessandri, founding a branch that produced several notables, and others reached the region of Genoa, where William was consul and became one of the ancestors of the Giustiniani. Later, Filippo, consul, gave rise to the Gialongo branch. In Genoa, the Longhi produced several personalities, advisors, ambassadors, and officials, including three dogi, the head of state: Giannandrea, Alessandro, and Luca Giustiniani Longo. Luca was also king of Corsica, a title associated with the Genoese doge. To the east, they went as far as Trento, Venice, and beyond, and to the south, they advanced as far as Parma, Bologna, Rome, Florence, and many other cities.

Marco Tulio was the brother of Cardinal William of Longis and custodian of Clement V, castellan of Fumone, and the origin of the marquises Longhi of Paolis, who survive to this day. One of his sons was a knight of the Order of the Golden Spur. In 1586, Giovanni Longhi, also an Ugonidi descendant, was admitted to the patriciate of Rome. There the Longhi flourished - and are likely to be all from the same branch - with a few individuals with no clear connection. The Longhi were admitted to the Order of Malta in 1587, and produced two beatified, Fillipo and Bartolo. They maintained kinship relations with numerous other less significant families of the Italian nobility, such as the Bellarmino, Malatesta, Caetani, Vitelleschi, Tebaldeschi, Bosone, Forteguerra, and Brancaccio.

== Other groups ==
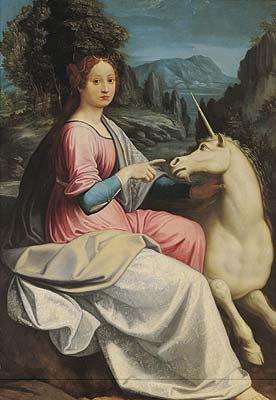
Alleged portrait of Giulia Farnese, by Luca Longhi, from a lineage of distinguished artists

Other groups appeared in Sicily, the kingdom of Naples, and the far south of Italy, but they are likely independent branches, although Lellis attributes to the Neapolitan branch (the main one) the same Roman origin derived from the Sempronios Longos, based on tradition. They produced notaries, judges, councilors, and other dignitaries, such as Filippo, knight of Malta in 1453, and Annamaria, founder of the Hospital of the Incurables in Naples.

Many other members were notable elsewhere, such as Pietro, podestà of Treviglio; Gerard was the supreme commander of the army of Rimini; William, first squire of the king of Savoy and secret chamberlain of Pius V; Bartholomew, adviser to Alfonso I of Aragon; Albert, master of Pope Innocent III and bishop of Anagni. They also emerged as renowned artists, literati, politicians, and other experts, and four Longhi stood out as architects in the Renaissance: Alessio, Martino Longhi the Elder, Onorio Longhi, and Martino Longhi the Younger.

== Modernity ==
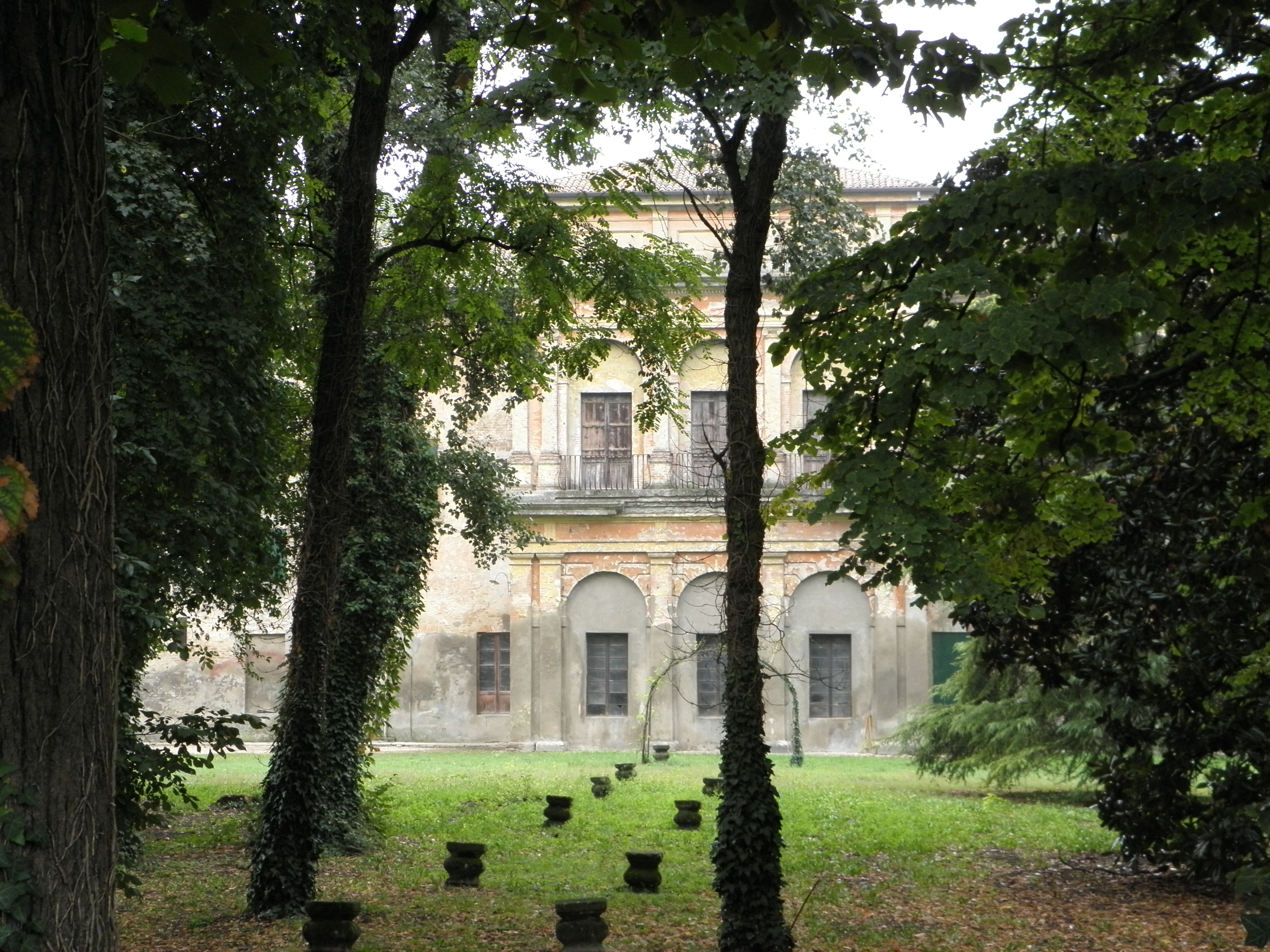
Villa Longhi in Crespino

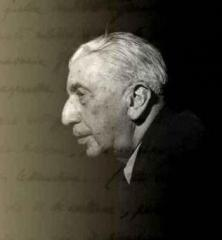
Roberto Longhi, art historian

In the 15th and 17th centuries, the Italian Longhi population was already numerous and the relations of consanguinity between the various groups, if they existed, are obscure, although some families, such as the aforementioned Ugonidi, have generated vast descendants. Many groups are still noble, recognized in Naples, Palermo, Vicenza, Seggio, Parma, Salerno, Rimini, Messina, Faenza, Trieste, Todi, Ravello, Como, Taormina, Milan, Mantua, Lecco, Cremona, Casale, Siena, Benevento, Turin, Trento, Nola, among other places. They received many fiefs, coats of arms and titles, among them those of hereditary knights; lords and marquises of Monforte; co-gentlemen of Ceresole; lords of Betta dal Toldo and Val di Rabbi; castellans (barons) of Castronuovo, Fiumetorto and Racalxacca; counts of Urgnano, Lomello and Torre Longhi; marquises of San Giuliano, Casentino and Vinchiaturo; barons and marquises of San Lorenzo del Vallo; besides producing bishops, archbishops, legates and pontifical governors and other prelates, ambassadors, officers, and communal syndics,

In the 18th century, records of Longhis without any indication of nobility began to multiply. Although many formerly noble branches ended up impoverished and thereby lost their original status, there are many others of popular origin, which took their name, for example, from the physical characteristics of their founders, who may have been unusually tall and thin men, or who reached very old age, two of the possible meanings of the word lungo. This form of surname adoption was frequent in Europe until recently.

Many Longhis emigrated to America during the 19th century, fleeing the great crisis that Italy was going through, between wars, famines, and devastation. In the 20th century, there were many other Longhi in evidence, such as Aleandro, senator; the Longhi marquises of Paolis de Fumone, who still live in one of Italy's most important medieval castles, partially museumized; Roberto Longhi, influential historian and art critic, grand officer of the Order of Merit of the Italian Republic and now the name of an important cultural foundation, and the De' Longhi branch, owner of the eponymous group, industrial magnates with 1.6 billion euros in revenue in 2013.

== See also ==
- Nobility of Italy
