= Cybo Chapel =

Chapel in the church of Santa Maria del Popolo, Rome

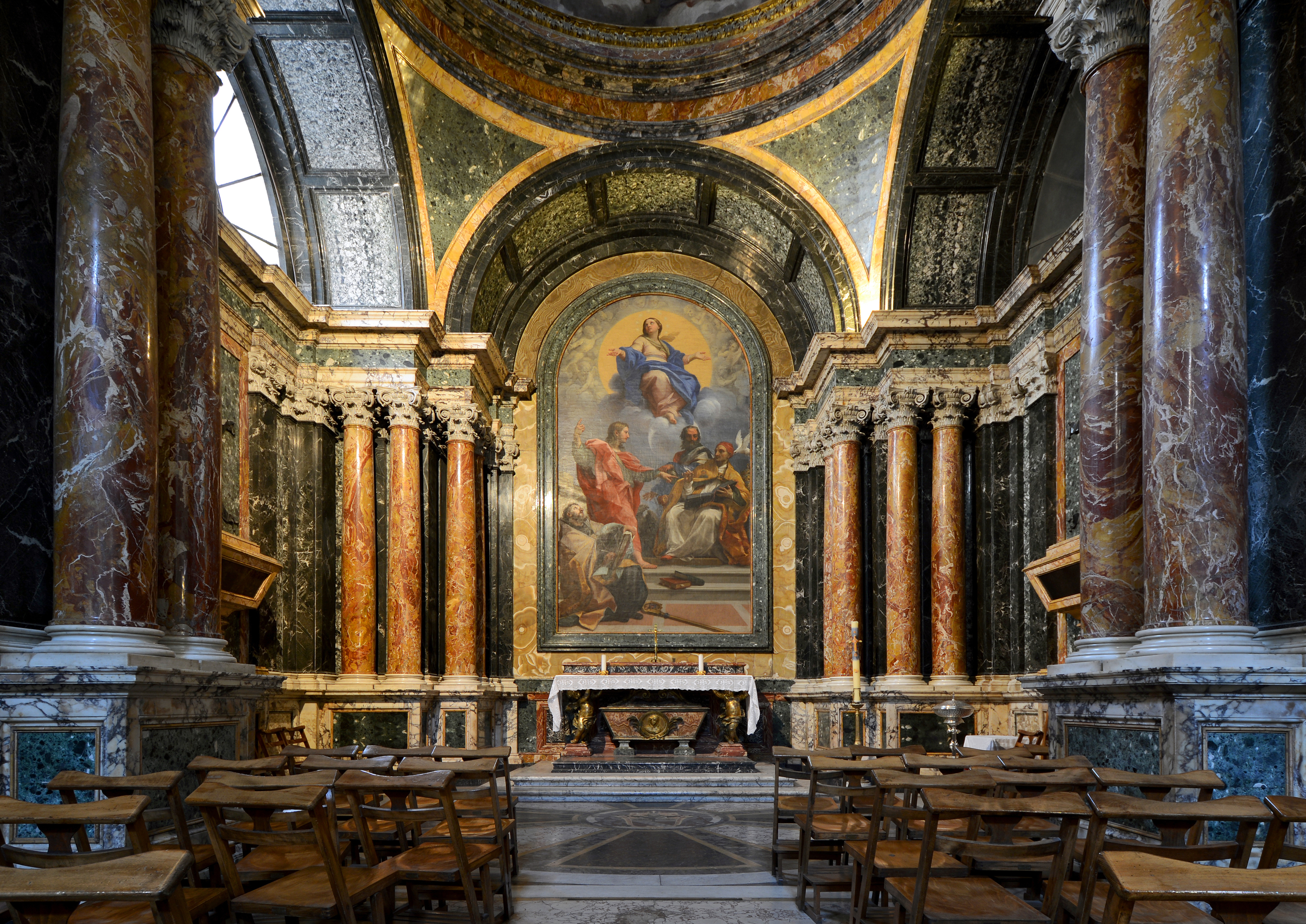
The chapel with the altarpiece of Carlo Maratta

The Cybo or Saint Lawrence Chapel (Italian: Cappella Cybo or Cappella di San Lorenzo) is the second side chapel in the right-hand aisle of the Basilica of Santa Maria del Popolo in Rome. For the beauty of its paintings, the preciousness of marble revetments covering its walls and the importance of the artists involved in its construction the chapel is regarded one of the most significant sacral monuments erected in Rome in the last quarter of the 17th century.

== History ==
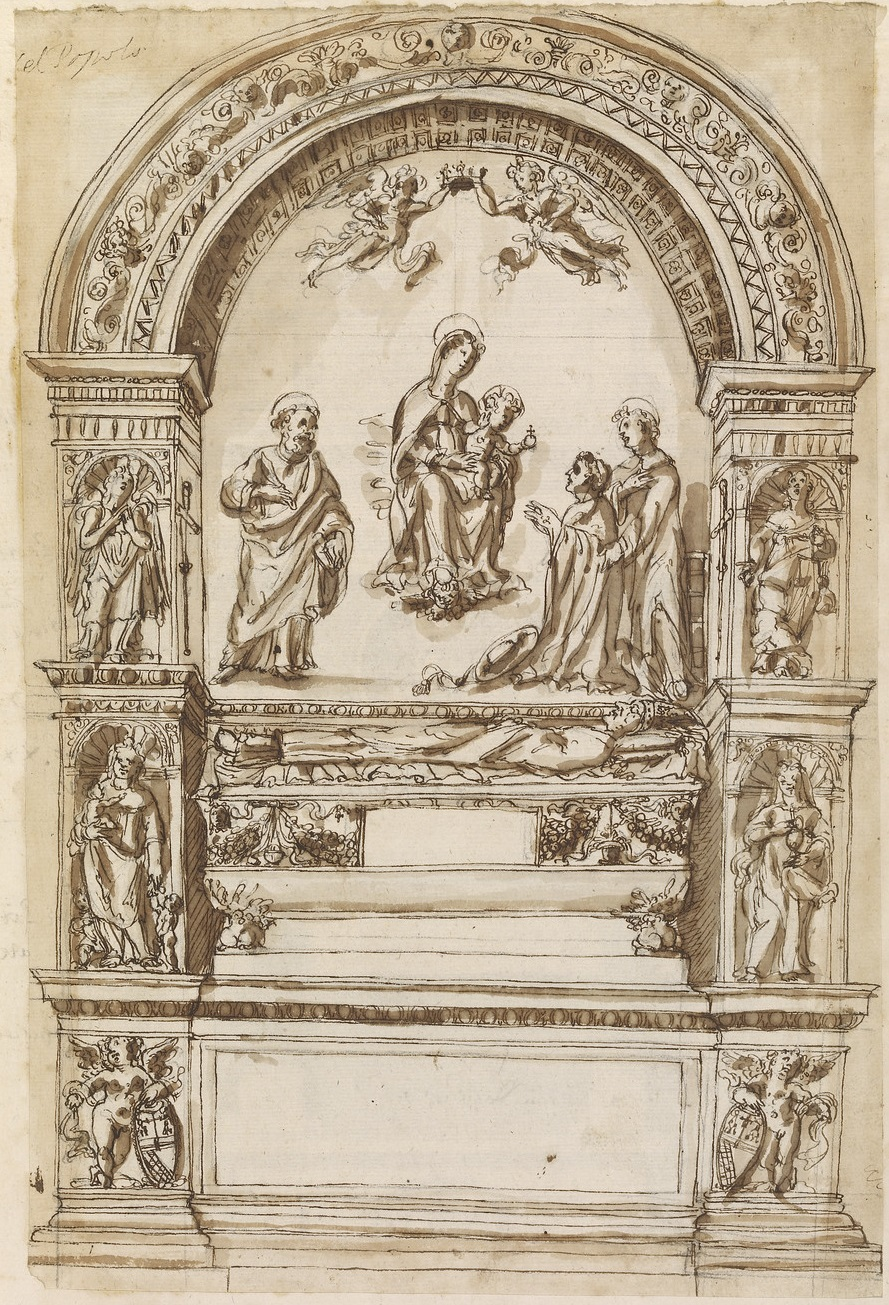
The original tomb of Lorenzo Cybo which was later dismantled (17th century drawing)

The previous chapel on this site was erected by Cardinal Lorenzo Cybo de Mari, nephew of Pope Innocent VIII, and dedicated to St Lawrence. Giorgio Vasari claimed that the patron was Cardinal Innocenzo Cybo but the dedication over the altar recorded the actual patron. Lorenzo Cybo de Mari was promoted to the cardinalate in 1489. The chapel was constructed during the time between his elevation and his death in 1503. Its architecture was identical to those of the left and right: the Chapel of the Nativity and the Basso Della Rovere Chapel. It was decorated with frescos by Pinturicchio and works by the school of Andrea Bregno which were lost during the later rebuilding. The old fresco of the Virgin and the Child by Pinturicchio was detached from the wall and sent by the cardinal to Massa in 1687. The fragment was re-used as the altarpiece of the Ducal Chapel of the Cathedral of Massa. The very fine funeral monument of Lorenzo Cybo de Mari was transferred to the church of San Cosimato where its fragments are still preserved. It is attributed to Andrea Bregno and Giovanni Cristoforo Romano and was made between 1503 and 1510.

The present chapel was built by Cardinal Alderano Cybo (1613–1700) to glorify the achievements of his family, the dukes of Massa and princes of Carrara. Construction works began in 1682 and ended five years later. The chapel was consecrated on 19 May 1687. The cardinal commissioned three painters, Pier Francesco Garoli, Luigi Garzi and Carlo Maratta to record his visit in the new chapel on a painting which is preserved in the Museo di Roma (Interior of the Cybo Chapel, 1687). The entrance arch was decorated by the ducal arms of the Cybo Malaspina dynasty made of polychrome marble.

== Description ==
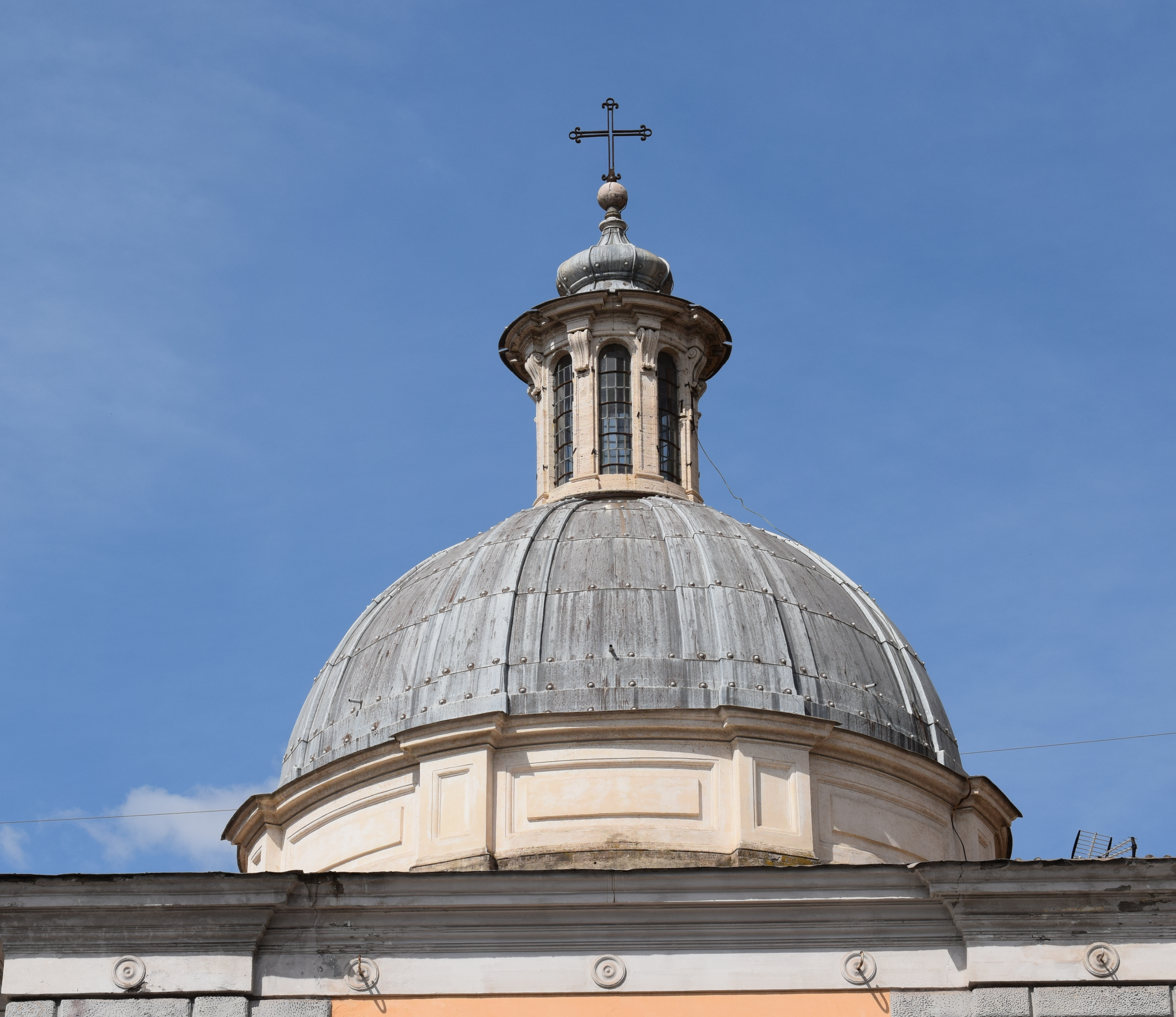
The dome of the chapel

The large chapel was constructed by Carlo Fontana in the form of a Greek cross set in a square. From the outside the chapel is almost totally hidden by view by the 19th-century extension of the Augustinian monastery except its dome which remains a prominent landmark on Piazza del Popolo. The lead-covered, octagonal dome rests on a low tambour, and it is topped with a fanciful Baroque stone lantern. This lantern has tall semicircular windows, a strongly projecting modillion cornice, and it is crowned with a small, onion shaped cupola, a ball and a cross. Before the Neo-Classical rebuilding of the monastery by Valadier the chapel had the appearance of a freestanding, central-plan, small church by the side of the basilica behind the wall of its enclosed garden. The main volume was a rectangular cube with cut off edges and two large semicircular windows on the side walls.

The barrel-vaulted vestibule is enclosed by a black marble balustrade. Inside the chapel the walls are covered by rich polychrome revetments in black marble and green verde antico. The eight columns flanking the pillars at the corners are yellow, red veined Sicilian jasper with white marble capitals. The colour scheme is rather dark creating a brooding atmosphere.

The huge altarpiece, painted with oil on the wall, is one of the most important works of Carlo Maratta, finished in 1686. It depicts the Disputation over the Immaculate Conception with the Four Doctors of the Church, St Augustine, John Chrysostom, John the Evangelist and Gregory the Great celebrating the purity of the Virgin. The composition is reminiscent of Raphael’s, and the details are rendered with an extreme precision and a particularly felicitous touch. The small alabaster fiorito coffin below the altar contains the relics of St Faustina of Rome. These were exhumed from the Catacomb of Callixtus in 1686 and given to Cardinal Alderano Cybo. They were laid to rest in the chapel on 5 May 1687.

The paintings of Daniel Seyter

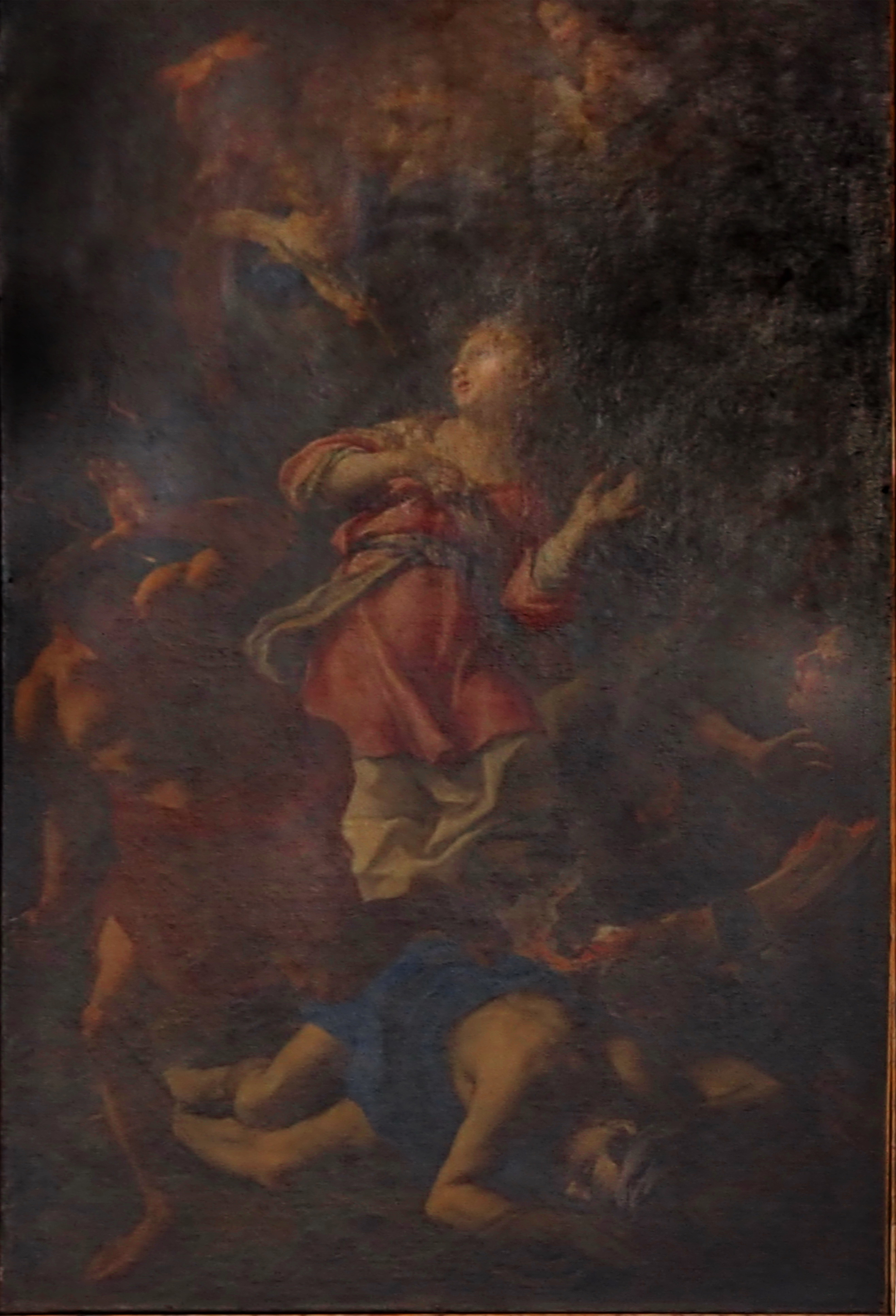

Martyrdom of St Catherine

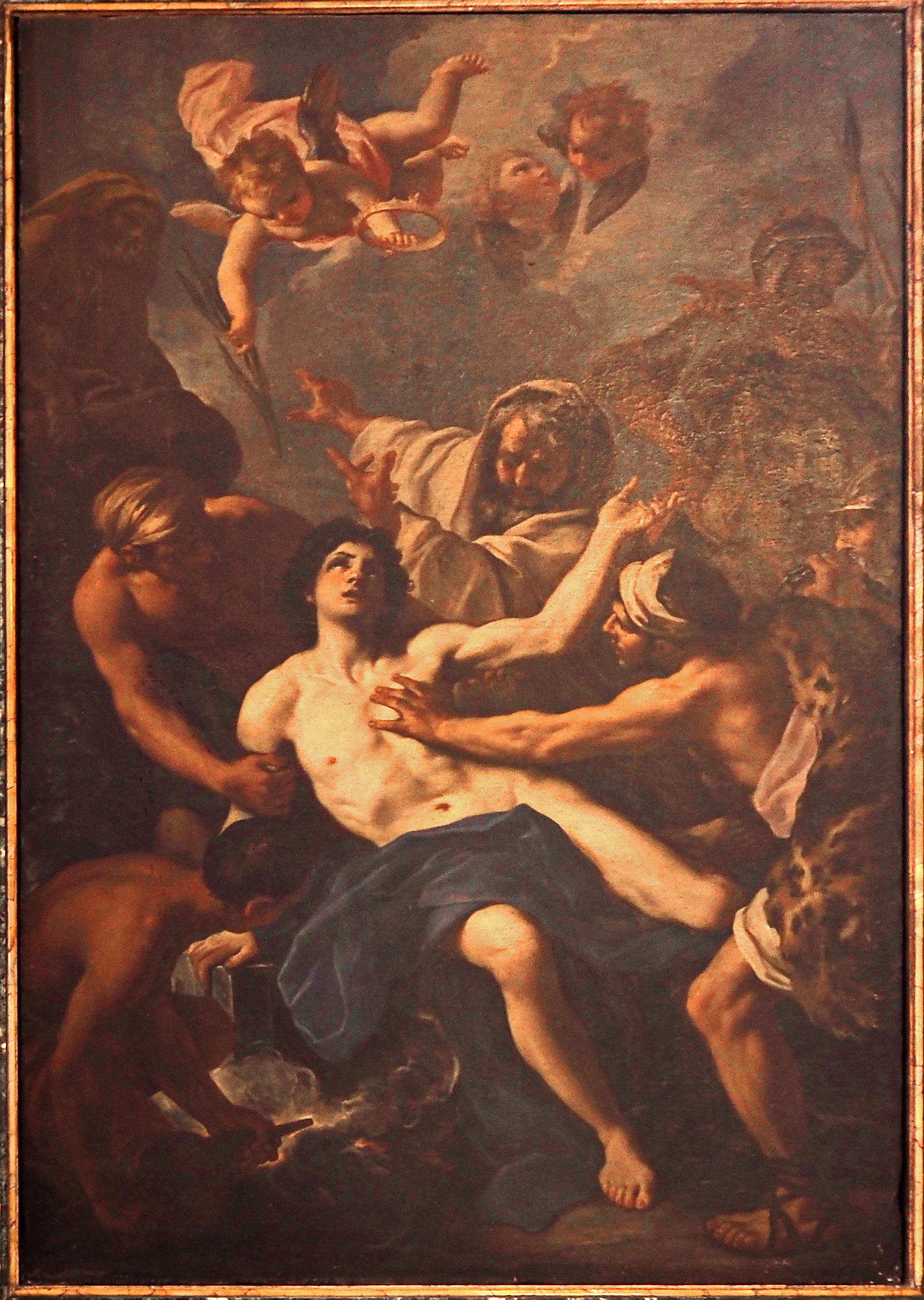

Martyrdom of St Lawrence

The swirling fresco of the dome was executed by Luigi Garzi in 1684 and depicts The eternal Father in glory among angels. On the side walls are the tombs of Cardinal Alderano and Lorenzo Cybo with marble busts sculpted by Francesco Cavallini. The two bronze putti holding up the main altar and the medallion with the relief portrait of Saint Faustina on the martyr's urn are also his works.

There are two paintings on the side walls of the vestibule by Daniel Seyter, the Martyrdom of St Catherine of Alexandria and the Martyrdom of St Lawrence. The first versions of these were painted by the Viennese artist between 1685 and 1686 using an unusual technique, oil on plaster. The paintings rapidly deteriorated and the best preserved fragments were sent to Massa by the cardinal to his nephew, Duke Carlo II Cybo-Malaspina in 1697. They were substituted with traditional oil paintings on canvas by the same Seiter between 1698 and 1700. The compositions remained similar.

The Cybo Chapel is the only one in the basilica where the decoration was extended on the corresponding section of the vault of the aisle. This surface is painted with a rich vegetal decoration of white acanthus scrolls on a yellow background. The keystone is decorated with the coat-of-arms of Pope Innocent VIII which is not very common in Rome.

== Gallery ==
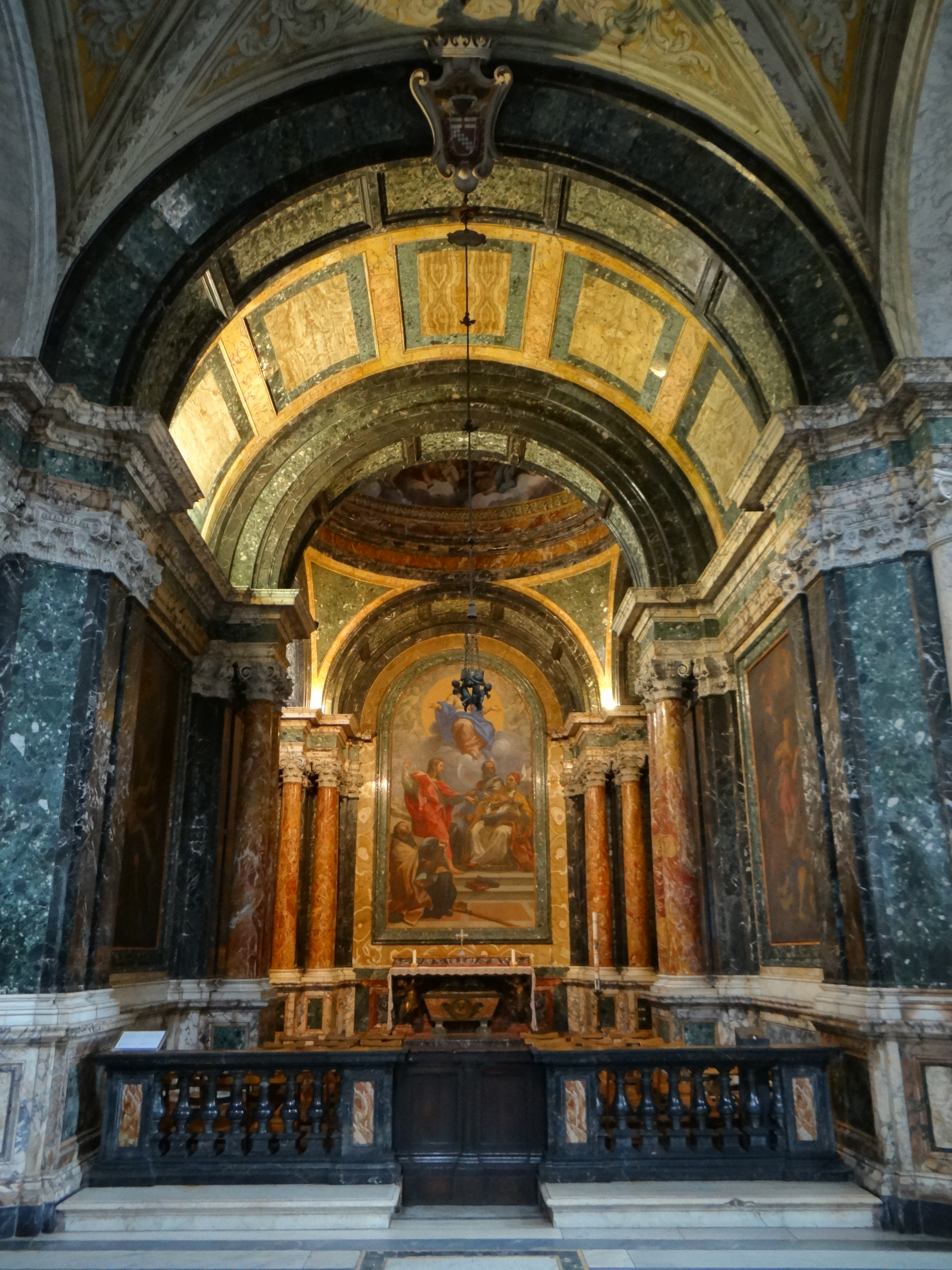
View of the chapel from the nave

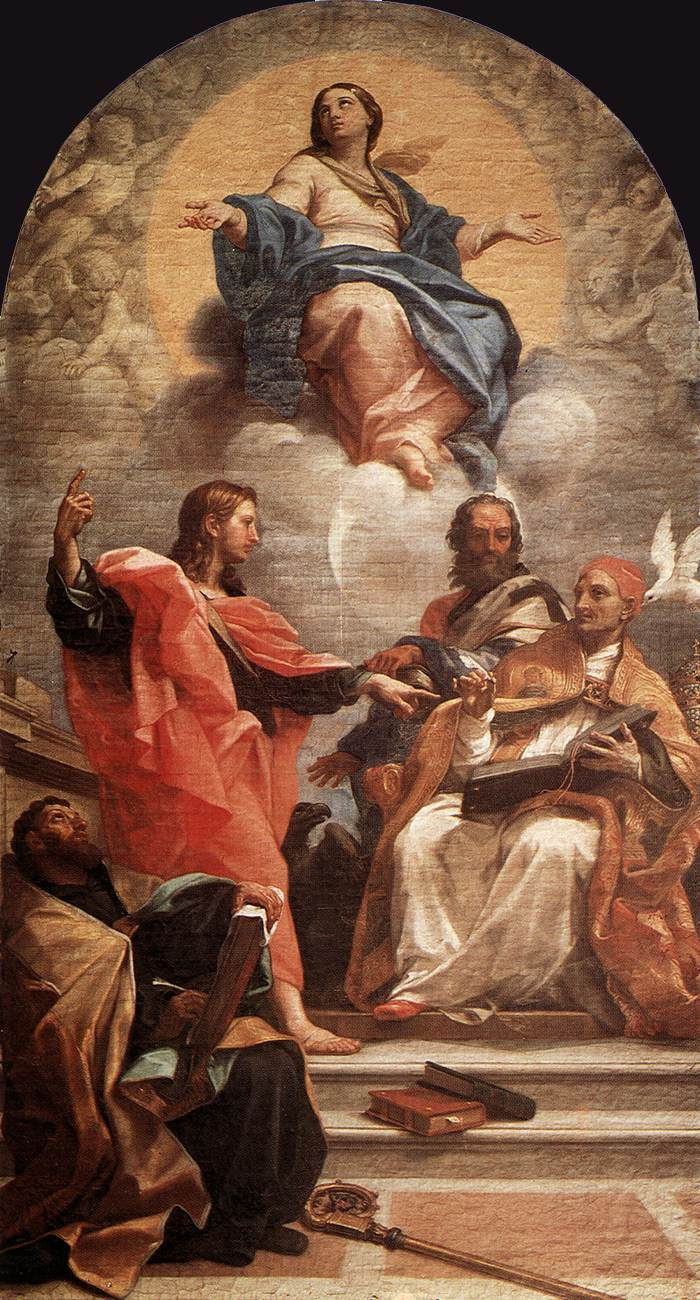
Carlo Maratta:Disputation over the Immaculate Conception

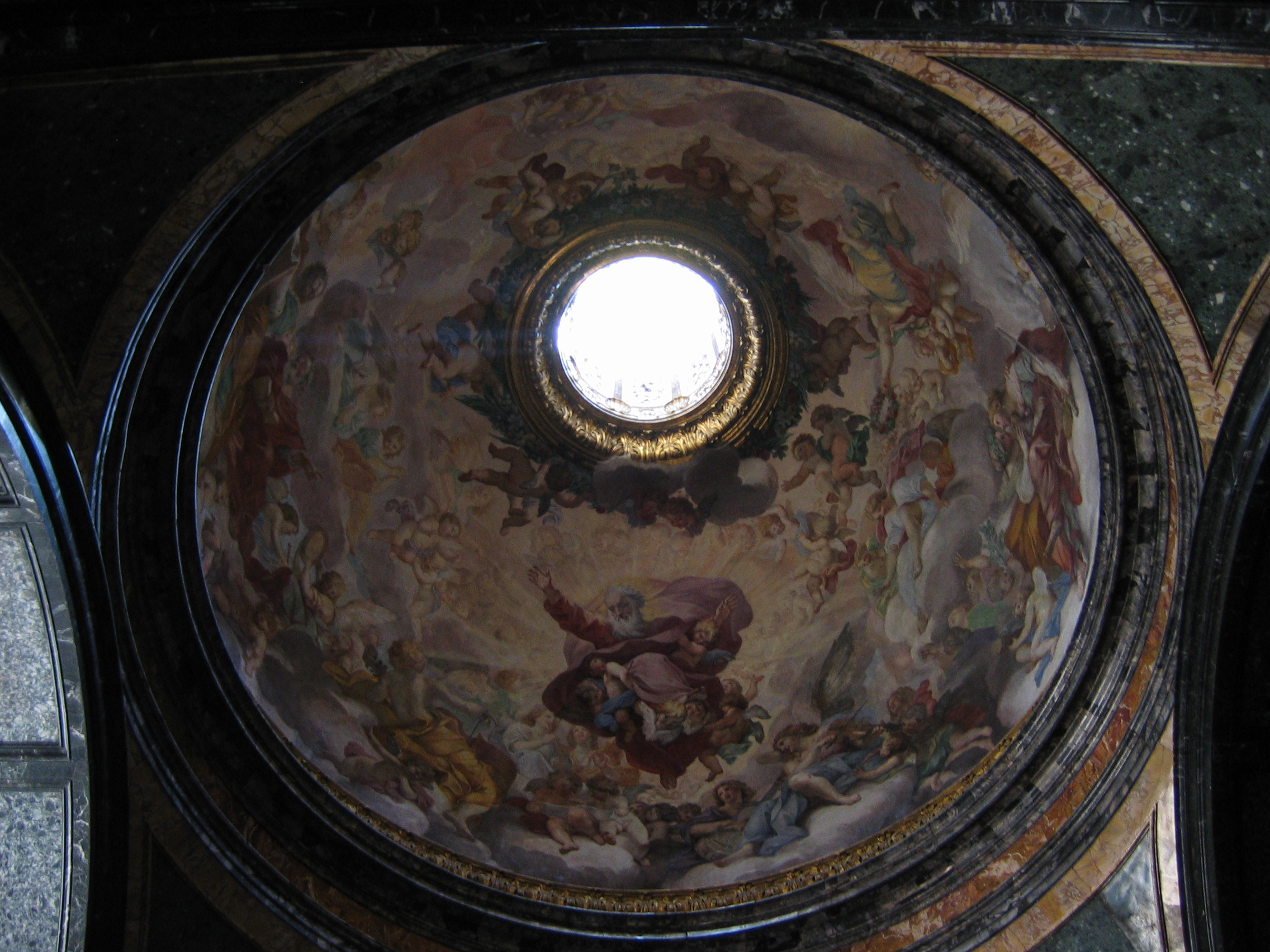
Dome fresco by Luigi Garzi: The eternal Father in glory among angels

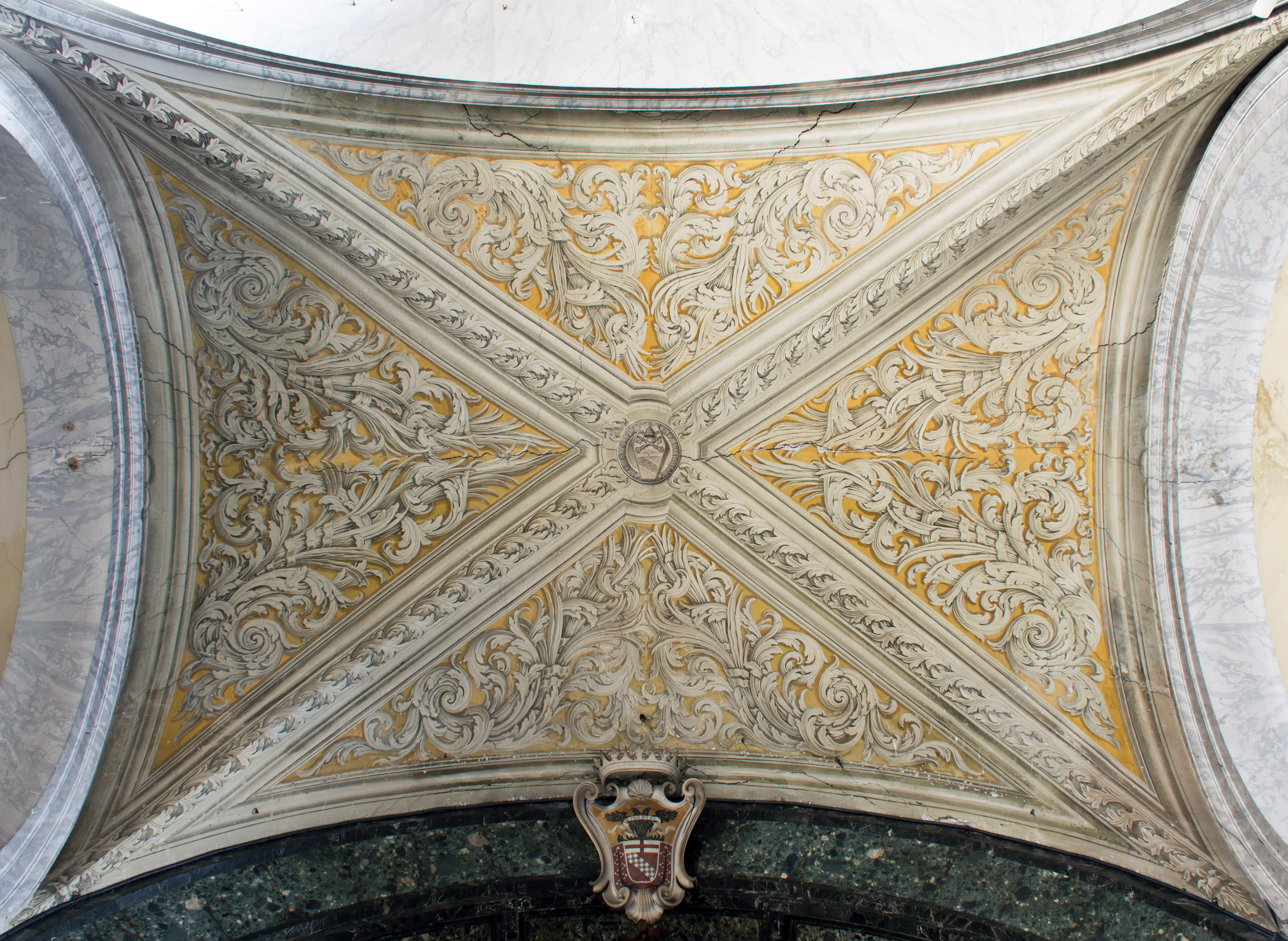
Painted decoration in the nave in front of the chapel.

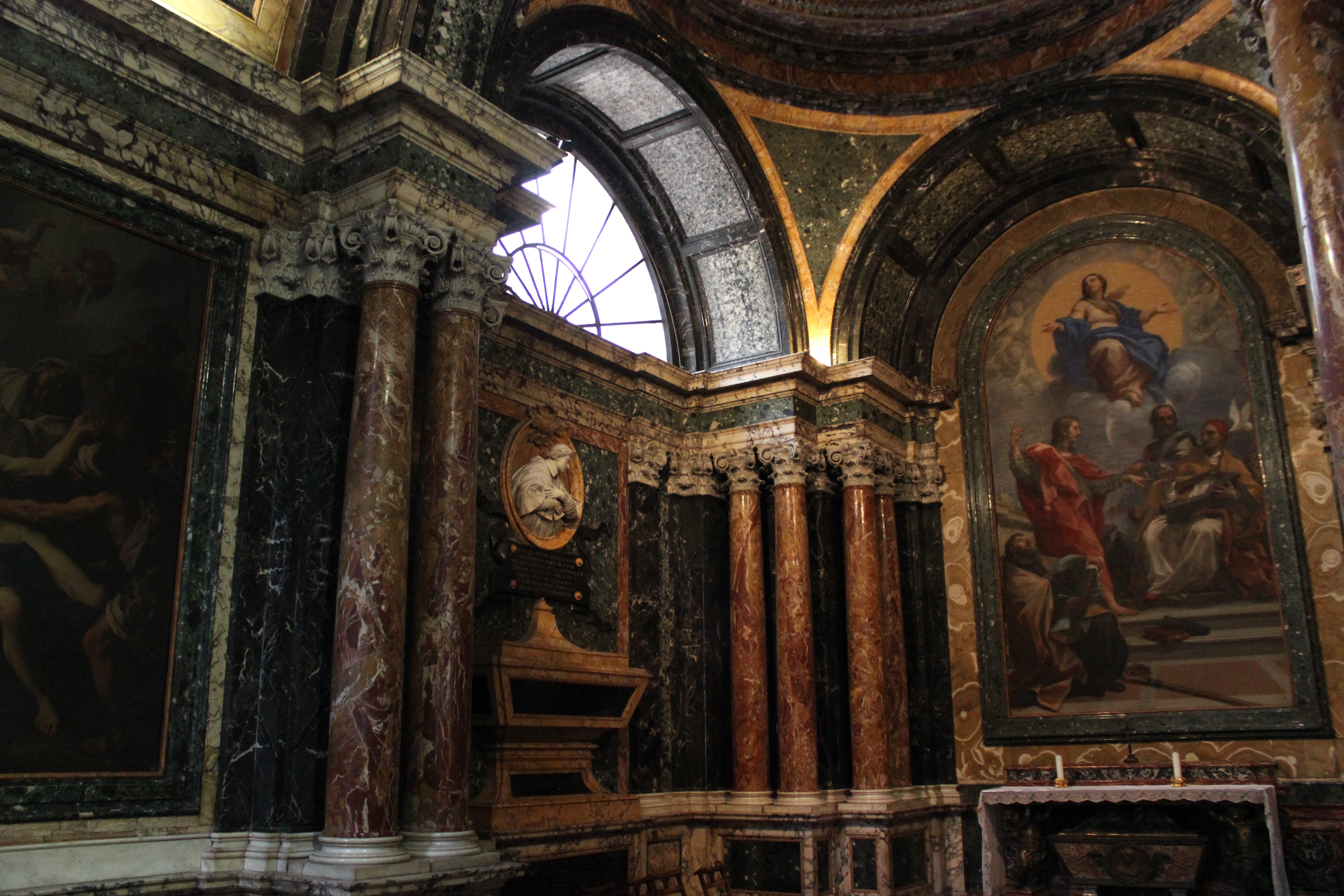
Side wall with the tomb of Lorenzo Cybo

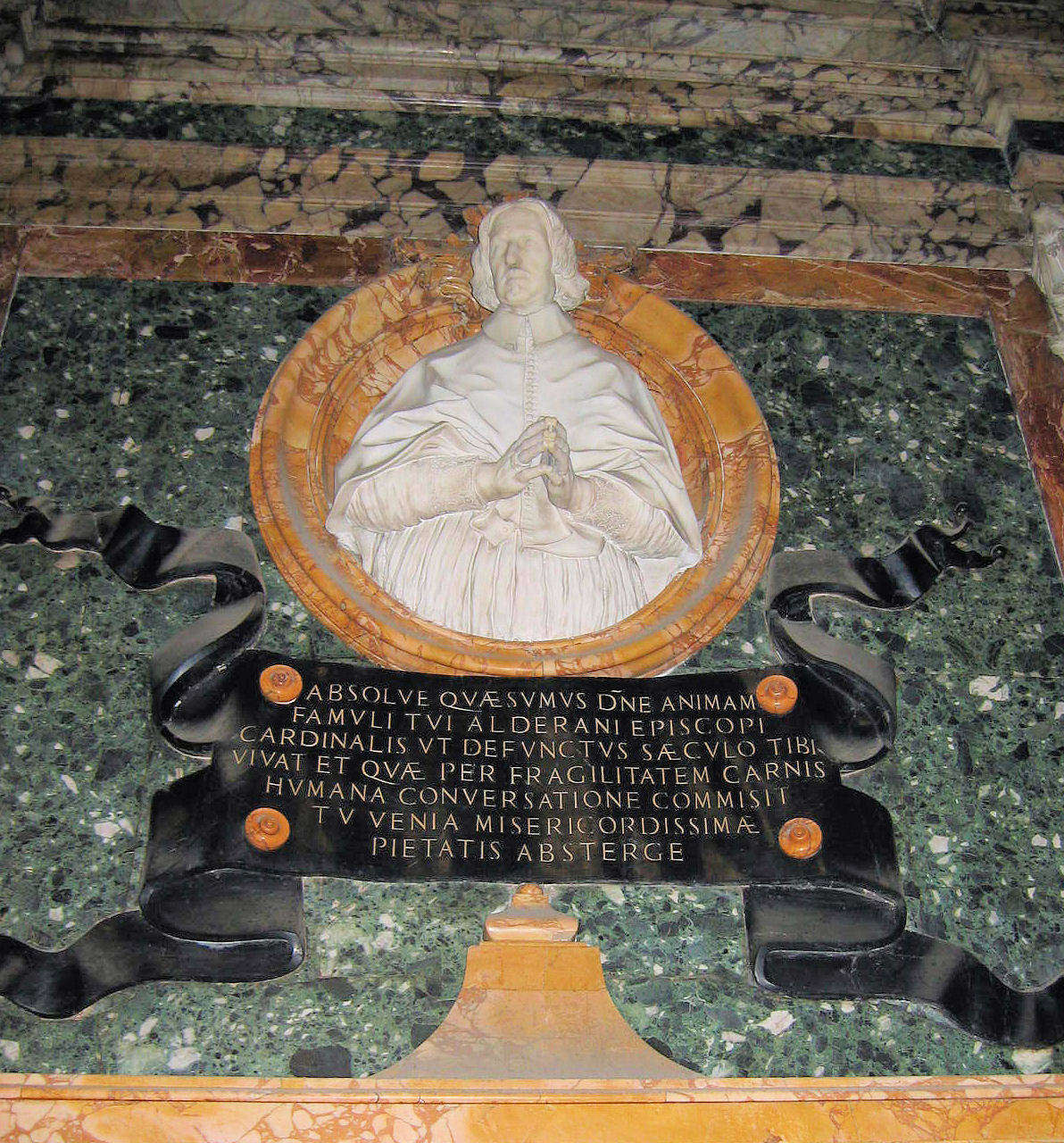
Tomb of Alderano Cybo by Francesco Cavallini

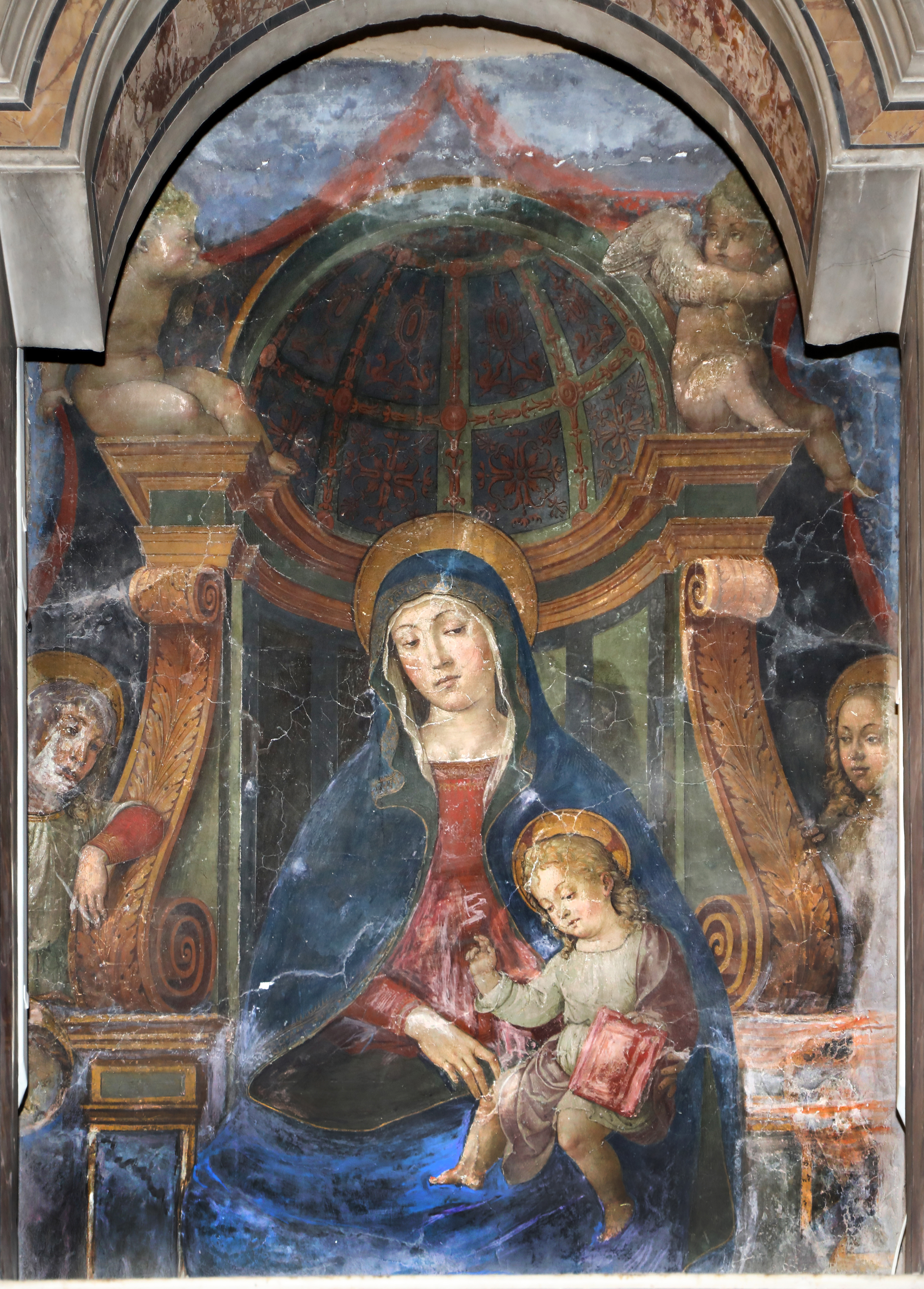
Fragment of the original fresco by Pinturicchio (now in the Cathedral of Massa)

== Bibliography ==
- Fabrizio Federici, Tre pittori per un dipinto: L’interno della Cappella Cybo del Museo di Roma, in: Bollettino dei Musei Comunali di Roma, n. s. XVI (2002), p. 49
- Fabrizio Federici, La diffusione della “prattica romana”: il cardinale Alderano Cybo e le chiese di Massa (1640–1700), in: Atti e Memorie della Deputazione di Storia Patria per le antiche Provincie Modenesi, s. XI - v. XXV, 2003, pp. 315–389.
- Lisa Passaglia Bauman, Piety and Public Consumption: Domenico, Girolamo and Julius II della Rovere at Santa Maria del Popolo; in: Patronage and Dynasty. The Rise of the Della Rovere in Renaissance Italy, Truman State University Press, 2007
