= Vitelleschi =

Vitelleschi is a surname related to the Vitelleschi noble family. Notable people with the surname include:

- Giovanni Vitelleschi (1396–1440), Italian cardinal and condottiere
- Mutio Vitelleschi (1563–1645), sixth Superior General of the Society of Jesus
- Sulpizia Vitelleschi (1635–1684), Italian heiress
