= Bellarmino =

Bellarmino is both a surname and a given name. Notable people with the name include:

- Robert Bellarmine (1542–1621), Saint and Cardinal of the Roman Catholic Church
- Bellarmino Bagatti (1905–1990), Roman Catholic archaeologist and ordained priest

== See also ==
- Bellarmine (disambiguation)
