= Terance =

Terance is a given name. Notable people with the name include:

- Terance James Bond (1946–2023), British painter
- Terance Mann (born 1996), American basketball player
- Terance Marin (born 1989), American baseball player
- Terance Mathis (born 1967), American basketball player
- Terance Reid (born 1957), South African cricketer

== See also ==
- Terence (given name)
- Terrance, given name
