= Terrance =

Terrance is an alternative spelling for the given name Terence, Notable People Include

== People ==
- Terrance Brennan, American chef and restaurateur
- Terrance Carroll (born 1969), American lawyer, minister, Speaker of the Colorado House of Representatives
- Terrance Cauthen (born 1976), American boxer
- Terrance Christopher, OMM, LVO, CD, retired Canadian Naval Officer, former Usher of the Black Rod for the Senate of Canada
- Terrance Copper (born 1982), American football wide receiver for the Kansas City Chiefs
- Terrance John Cox, also known as TJ Cox (born 1963), American engineer and politician
- Terrance Dean Black American Writer
- Terrance Dicks (1935–2019), English writer, best known for his work in TV and children's books
- Terrance Dotsy (born 1981), American football player
- Terrance T. Etnyre, United States Vice Admiral
- Terrance Freeman, American politician
- Terrance Dee Funk, generally known by his ring name Terry Funk (1944–2023), American professional wrestler
- Terrance Gainer (born 1947), the 38th and current Sergeant at Arms of the United States Senate
- Terrance Gore (born 1991), American baseball player
- Terrance Hayes (born 1971), prize-winning poet, born in Columbia, South Carolina
- Terrance Hobbs (born 1970), lead guitarist in the New York Death Metal band Suffocation
- Terrance Jamison, American football coach and former player
- Terrance Knighton (born 1986), American football defensive tackle for the Jacksonville Jaguars
- Terrance B. Lettsome (1935–2007), politician (main British Virgin Islands airport is named after him)
- Terrance Lindall (born 1944), American artist who was born in Minneapolis, Minnesota
- Terrance Odean, professor of banking and finance at the Haas School of Business, University of California, Berkeley
- Terrance Parks (born 1990), American football player
- Terrance Pennington (born 1983), American football guard and offensive tackle for the New York Giants
- Terrance Roberson (born 1976), American professional basketball player
- Terrance Shaw (born 1973), played as a cornerback in many teams
- Terrance Simien (born 1965), American zydeco musician, vocalist and songwriter
- Terrance Simmons (born 1976), former American football defensive tackle
- Terrance Taylor (American football) (born 1986), American football defensive tackle for the Indianapolis Colts
- Terrance Thomas (born 1980), American professional basketball player
- Terrance Zdunich, American actor, writer, composer, and storyboard artist

== Fictional characters ==
- Terrance "Terry" Hawthorne, a character in the 1985 American adventure comedy film Pee-wee's Big Adventure
- Terrance Henry Stoot, a character and part of in-universe comedic duo Terrance and Phillip from South Park

== See also ==
- Terance, given name
- Terence (given name)
