= Tarquinia Cathedral =

Cathedral in Tarquinia, Italy

Coordinates: 42.2544°N 11.7550°E

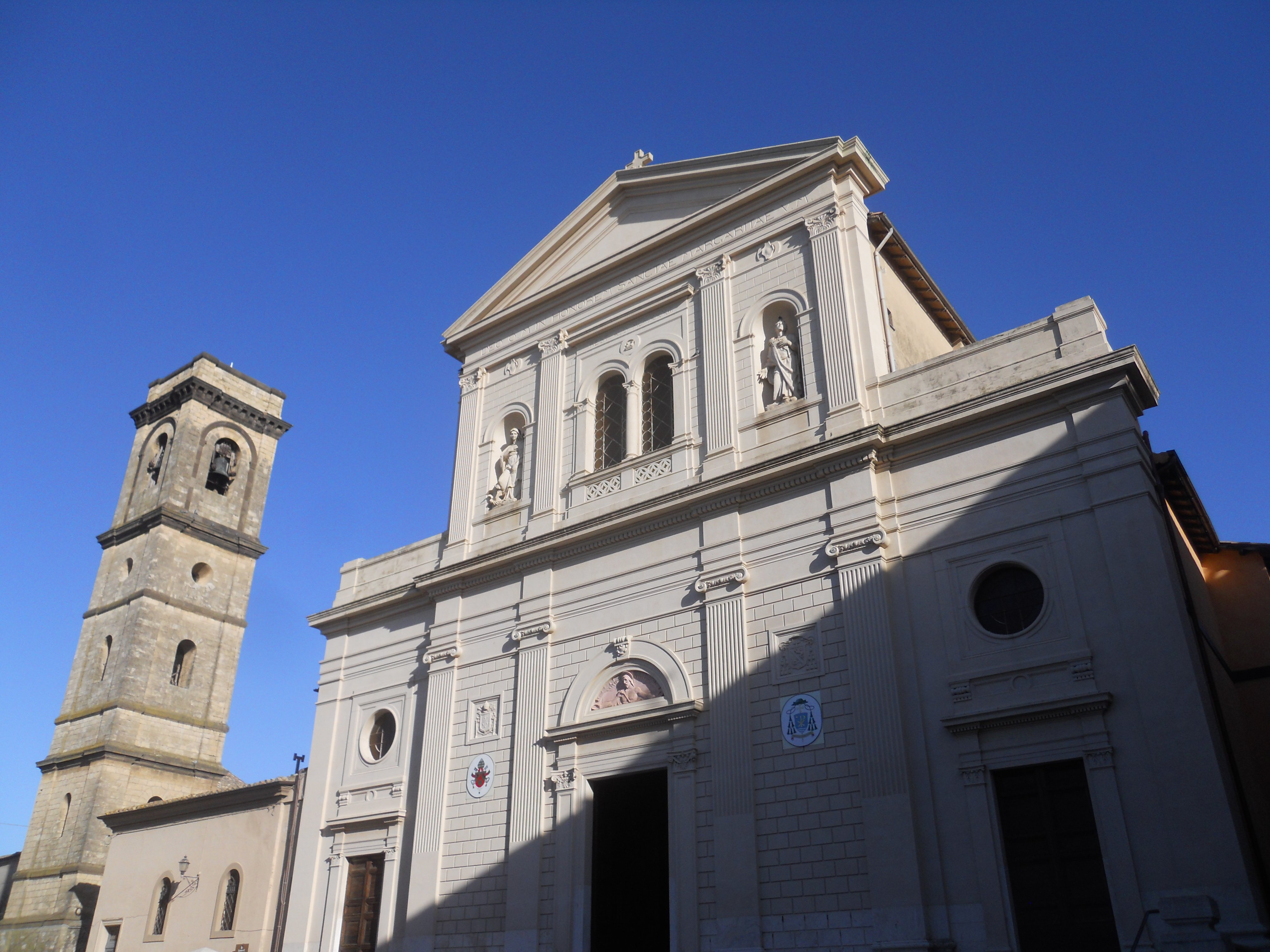
West front and campanile of the cathedral

Tarquinia Cathedral (Italian: Duomo di Tarquinia; Concattedrale dei Santi Margherita e Martino) is a Roman Catholic cathedral in Tarquinia, Lazio, Italy, dedicated to Saint Margaret and Saint Martin.

== History ==
Formerly the episcopal seat of the Diocese of Tarquinia, previously known as the Diocese of Corneto, since 1986 it has been a co-cathedral of the Diocese of Civitavecchia-Tarquinia.

== Art ==
The cathedral's Vitelleschi Chapel was decorated with a series of murals by Antonio del Massaro.
