= Diocese of Corneto =

Former Latin Catholic diocese in Italy

The Diocese of Corneto was a Latin Church diocese of the Catholic Church in Italy. Its episcopal see was Corneto, an old name for Tarquinia. It was absorbed by the Diocese of Civitavecchia-Tarquinia.

== See also ==
- Diocese of Montefiascone
- Diocese of Civitavecchia-Tarquinia
- Tarquinia Cathedral
- Catholic Church in Italy
