= Giovanni Vitelleschi =

Catholic cardinal (1396–1440)

His Eminence Giovanni Vitelleschi
- Archbishop of Florence
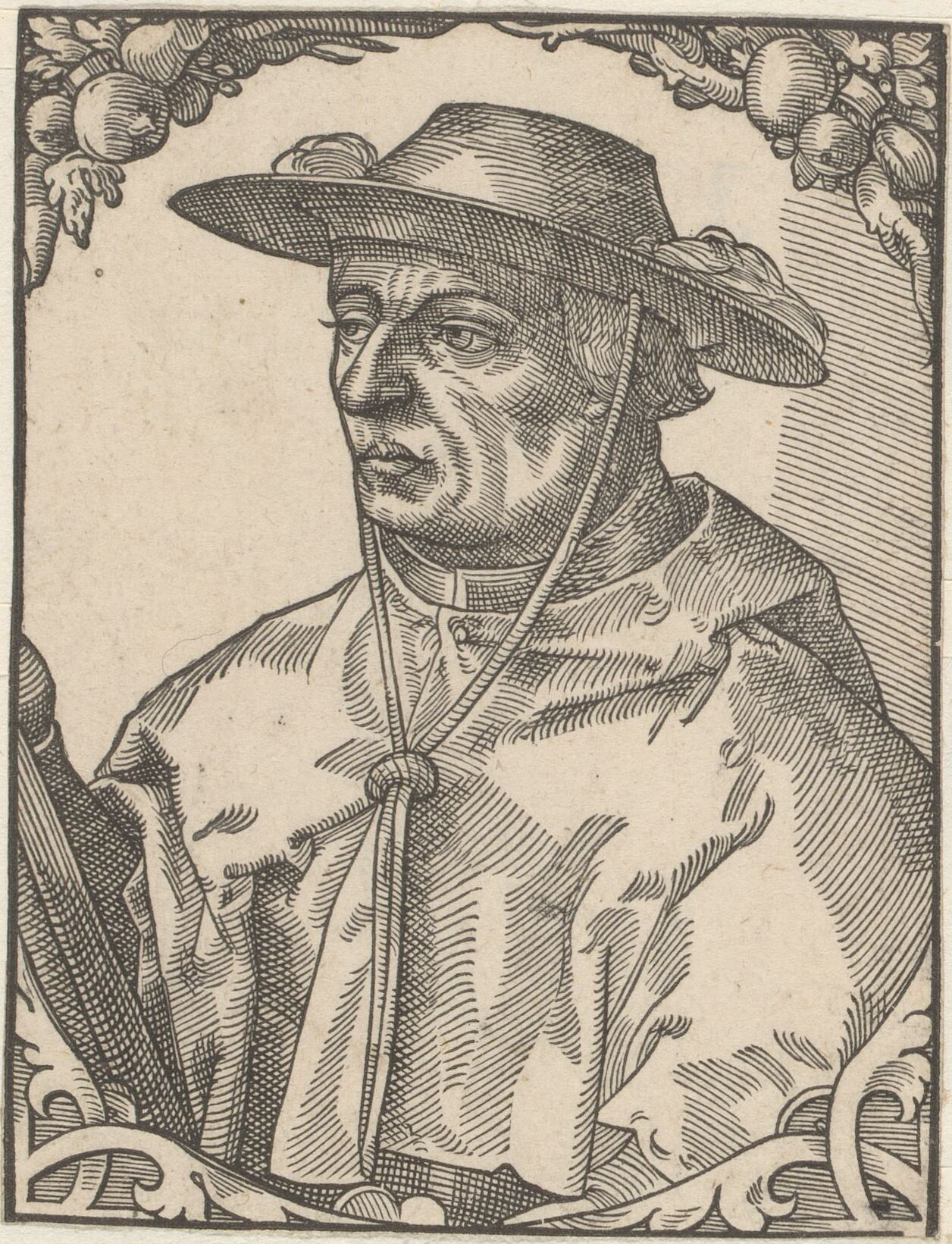
- Engraved portrait of Giovanni Vitelleschi by Tobias Stimmer
- Church: Catholic Church
- Archdiocese: Florence
- Appointed: 12 October 1435
- Term ended: 9 August 1437
- Predecessor: Amerigo Corsini
- Successor: Ludovico Trevisan
- Other posts: Cardinal-Priest of San Lorenzo in Lucina (1437–1440)

Orders
- Created cardinal: 9 August 1437 by Pope Eugene IV
- Rank: Cardinal-Priest

Personal details
- Born: Giovanni Maria Vitelleschi; 1396 Tarquinia, Italy
- Died: 2 April 1440 (aged 43–44) Rome, Papal States
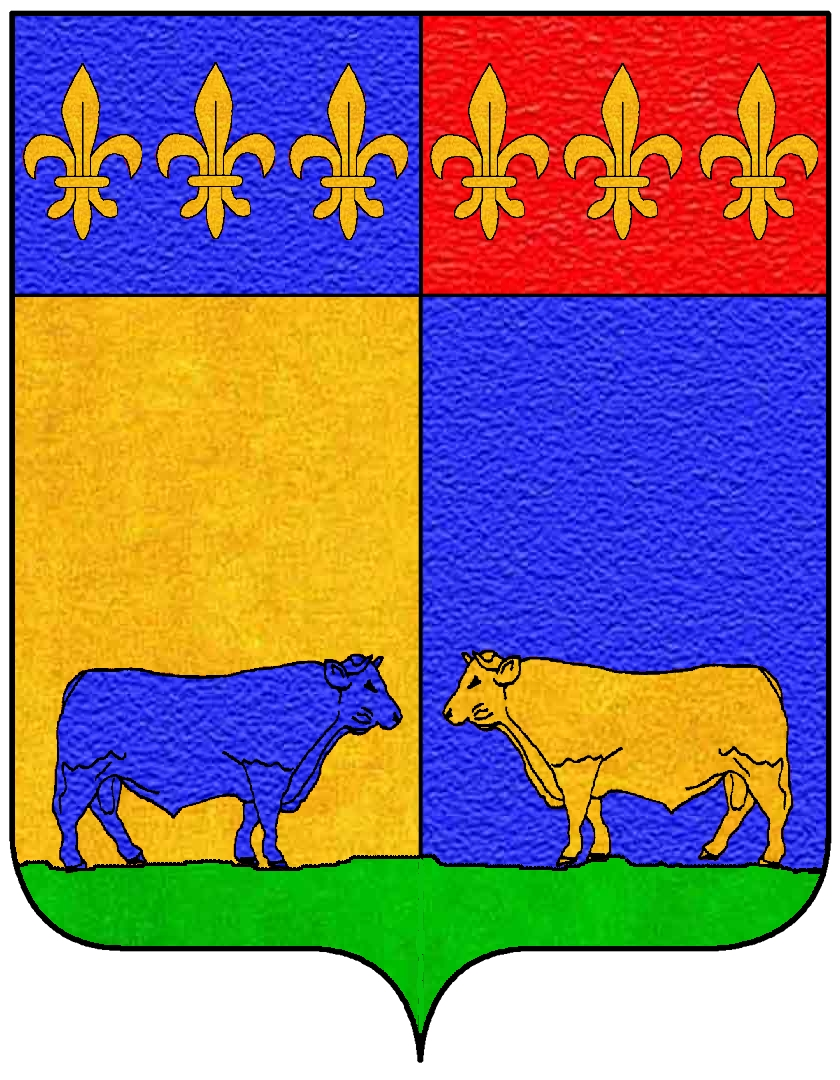
- Coat of arms

Giovanni Maria Vitelleschi (1396 – 2 April 1440) was an Italian cardinal and condottiere.

In 1434, Vitelleschi was the commander of the papal armies of Pope Eugene IV when the Colonna faction at Rome backed an insurrection that raised a temporary republic at Rome and exiled Eugene. Vitelleschi managed to recapture the city and had the Roman Senate declare him tertius pater patriae post Romulum ("the third Father of his Country since Romulus"). He remained powerful for a few years, but his intercepted correspondence indicated that he was conspiring against Eugene. Eugene had his former commander arrested and incarcerated in the Castel Sant'Angelo.

== Biography ==
Vitelleschi was born in Corneto (modern Tarquinia, then part of the Papal States), some kilometres north of Rome, as a member of the Vitelleschi noble family. He received a military education, which he refined as apostolic protonotary under Pope Martin V. The fighting bishop of Recanati from 1431, and afterwards made a cardinal, he was commander of the papal armies of Pope Eugene IV when the Colonna faction at Rome, infuriated by the reversal of their fortunes when Eugene succeeded Martin V (a member of the Colonna), backed an insurrection that raised a temporary republic at Rome and forced Eugene into exile at Florence in May 1434. The city was restored to obedience by Giovanni Vitelleschi in the following October, in a display of ferocious cruelty. Vitelleschi abrogated all Roman rights and had the Roman Senate declare him tertius pater patriae post Romulum ("the third Father of his Country since Romulus"). He commanded the papal troops against René of Anjou, who claimed the throne of Naples. In 1439 he was sent by the Pope to expel the rebel Corrado IV Trinci from Foligno, which he besieged and captured. The nobleman was beheaded and the city restored to Papal authority.

Vitelleschi had received his military training as a youth in the banda of Tartaglia and refined his education under the tutelage of Pope Martin V, who made him apostolic pronotary. His success at putting down the republicans at Rome earned him the purely honorary title Latin Patriarch of Alexandria and the more immediate one of archbishop of Florence. He was made a cardinal on 9 August 1437 and was called the "Cardinal of Florence" where, according to Machiavelli, he was regarded with deep distrust:

He was bold and cunning; and, having obtained great influence, was appointed to command all the forces of the church, and conduct all the enterprises of the pontiff, whether in Tuscany, Romagna, the kingdom of Naples, or in Rome. Hence he acquired so much power over the pontiff, and the papal troops, that the former was afraid of commanding him, and the latter obeyed no one else

Florence's spies kept a close watch over the mail and soon intercepted letters from the Patriarch to Niccolò Piccinino, who was currently ravaging Tuscany with his warband. The correspondence was in cypher and full of circumlocutions but was interpreted as dangerous to the Pope himself. Eugene IV determined to incarcerate the Patriarch. The manner in which he was caught at Castel Sant'Angelo in Rome by its castellan, Antonio Rido of Padua, is recounted by Machiavelli

The patriarch, having determined to go into Tuscany, prepared to leave Rome on the following day, and ordered the castellan to be upon the drawbridge of the fortress in the morning, for he wished to speak with him as he passed. Antonio perceived this to be the favourable moment, informed his people what they were to do, and awaited the arrival of the patriarch upon the bridge, which adjoined the building, and might for the purpose of security be raised or lowered as occasion required. The appointed time found him punctual; and Antonio, having drawn him, as if for the convenience of conversation, on to the bridge, gave a signal to his men, who immediately raised it, and in a moment the cardinal, from being a commander of armies, found himself a prisoner of the castellan. The patriarch's followers at first began to use threats, but being informed of the pope's directions they were appeased. The castellan comforting him with kind words, he replied, that "the great do not make each other prisoners to let them go again; and that those whom it is proper to take, it is not well to set free." He shortly afterwards died in prison.

Vitelleschi died in 1440 and was succeeded by Ludovico Trevisan. The Vitelleschi clan retained considerable weight in Central Italy. Vitelleschi's nephew, Bartolomeo Vitelleschi (died 13 December 1463), bishop of Corneto and Montefiascone, was made a cardinal on 6 April 1444. Giovanni Vitelleschi commissioned Filippo Lippi to paint the famous Madonna and Child Enthroned (now in Palazzo Barberini, Rome) for his palace in Tarquinia.
