= Sulpizia Vitelleschi =

Italian aristocrat

Sulpizia Vitelleschi (1635–1684) was an Italian heiress. She was one of the people implicated in the infamous Spana Prosecution.

== Life ==
She was born to the extremely rich nobleman Ippolito Vitelleschi (1584-1654) and Angela Vitelleschi in the Vitelleschi noble family. She was the heiress of her parents and the richest woman in Rome.

In 1647, she married Girolamo Mattei (1621-1656), brother of cardinal Orazio Mattei, who died during the Plague in Rome 22 August 1656. In December 1656, only four months after the death of her first spouse, she married her cousin Antonio II Tassi (1623-1672), Marchese di Paullo and captain of the royal guard of the viceroy of Naples.

On 31 January 1659, Giovanna De Grandis was arrested in Rome and imprisoned in the Papal prison at Tor di Nona, which was the beginning of the infamous Spana Prosecution, exposing Gironima Spana's network of poison dealers in Rome. Span herself was arrested in February. In April, Spana's maid Francesca Flore was interrogated, and implicated Sulpizia Vitelleschi in her testimony. Flore stated that Spana "once gave her liquid to a lady who lives on Via del Corso. I don’t know her first name, but I heard her tell Gironima she was the Lady Vitelleschi. I once heard the Lady Vitelleschi complain about her husband—that he was too arrogant and she couldn’t live with him." Flore stated that Spana sold the poison to Vitelleschi in the year 1657, after which Vitelleschi had become a widow.

The testimony of Francesca Flore appeared to confuse the dates, since in 1657, Sulpizia Vitelleschi had been married to her second spouse, who was still alive, since the year prior. Out of consideration of the social rank of Sulpizia Vitelleschi, the authorities refrained from considering the possibility that the dates may have been confused and from examining the death of her first spouse, and her name was not mentioned further in the investigation.
