= Vitelleschi (noble family) =

Vitelleschi is a noble Italian family from Foligno and Corneto. They are descended from the powerful family of Vitelli from Città di Castello, Umbria. The family established itself in Rome in the sixteenth century. In 1600, Virginia Vitelleschi married Girolamo Nobili di Rieti, giving rise to the family of Nobili-Vitelleschi.

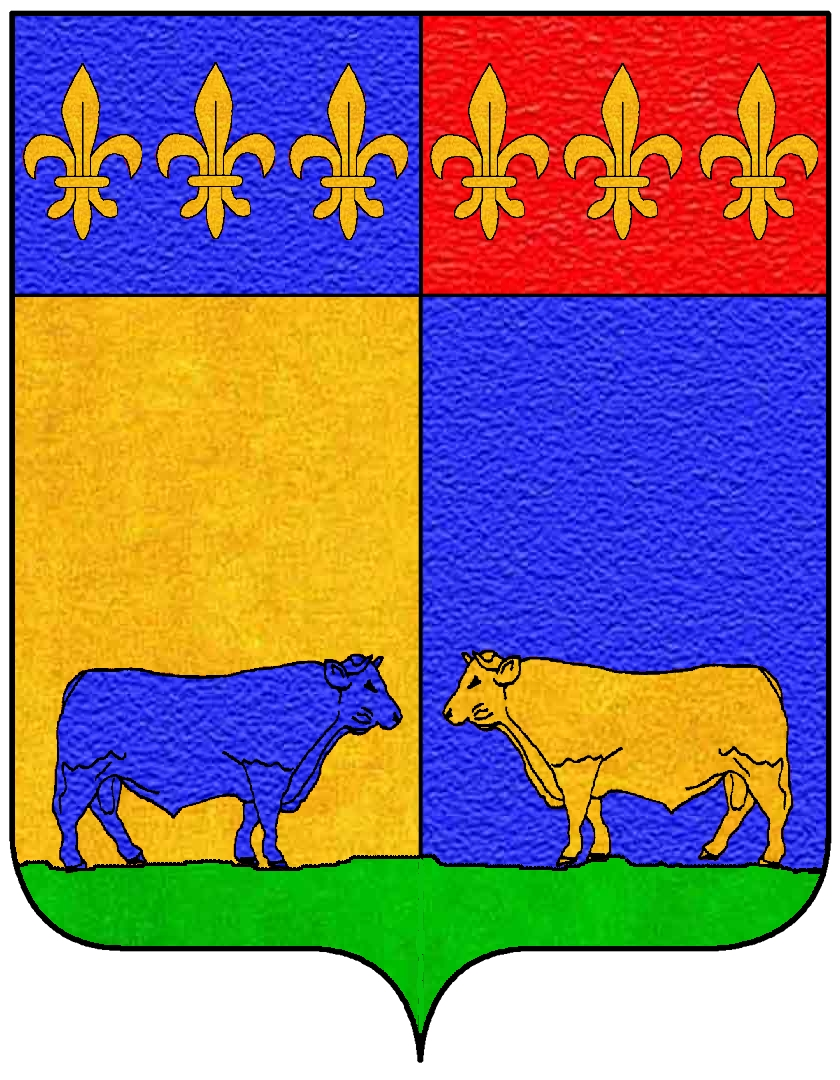
The Vitelleschi family crest

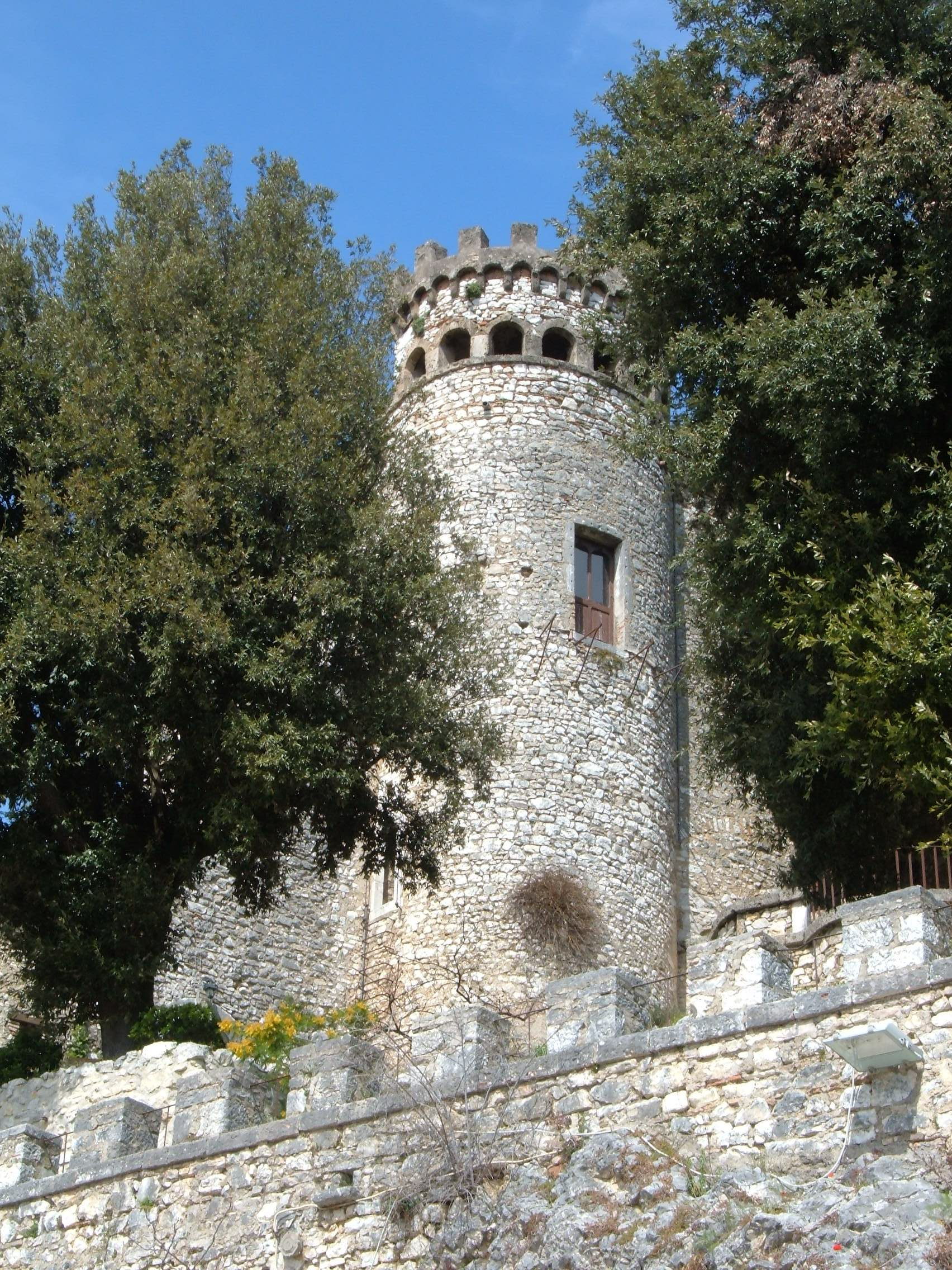
Nobili Vitelleschi castle in Labro, Lazio

== Notable members of the family ==
- Giovanni Maria Vitelleschi (1390–1440), cardinal and leader
- Bartolomeo Vitelleschi (1410–1463), bishop
- Muzio Vitelleschi (1563–1645), Superior General of the Society of Jesus from 1615 until his death
- Sulpizia Vitelleschi (1635–1684), Italian heiress
- Salvatore Nobili Vitelleschi (1818–1875), cardinal
- Francesco Vitelleschi Nobili (1829–1906), senator

== Family properties ==
- Palazzo Vitelleschi in Tarquinia
- Palazzo Nobili Vitelleschi in Labro
- Palazzo Verospi Vitelleschi in Roma

== Bibliography ==
- di Crollalanza, Giovan Battista (1886). Dizionario storico blasonico delle famiglie nobili o notabili italiane estinte e fiorenti (Vol.3 ed.). Bologna: A. Forni.
