= Mutio Vitelleschi =

Sixth Superior General of the Society of Jesus

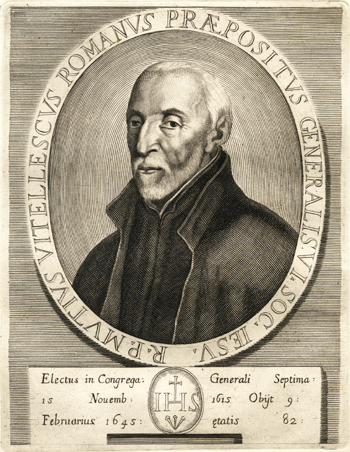
Very Rev. Mutio Vitelleschi, S.J.

Mutio Vitelleschi (2 December 1563 – 9 February 1645) was the sixth Superior General of the Society of Jesus and member of the Vitelleschi noble family. Although he was destined for a general ecclesiastical career, a growing desire to enter the Society of Jesus culminated in his taking private vows to enter the novitiate. His parents opposed this, possibly because of the promise not to seek ecclesiastical office or status that Jesuits make. However he was able to receive permission from Pope Gregory XIII, a strong supporter of the Jesuits, a concession to enter the novitiate against his family's will.

== Work ==
Vitelleschi taught logic in 1588–1589, natural philosophy in 1589–1590, and metaphysics in 1590–1591; later he was professor of theology, then prefect of studies and finally he was elected general of the Society of Jesus in 1615. His lectures on natural philosophy include Physics, De caelo, De generatione, and Meteorology.

== Early missions in the Society ==
After entering the novitiate on 15 August 1583, he taught in the Roman College, and then was appointed rector of the English College, Rome, enjoying two stints (1592–1594, and 1597–1598). He was also Provincial of the then Neapolitan Province, and later the Roman Province.

Apart from his fame as a good teacher and orator, the only historical details that we have from these times are a sermon that he delivered to Pope Gregory, on Good Friday in 1590, on the passion of Christ.

== Vitelleschi in fiction ==
He is portrayed positively as a minor figure in the fictional 1632 series, also known as the 1632-verse or Ring of Fire series, an alternate history book series, created, primarily co-written, and coordinated by historian Eric Flint.

== Sources ==
- Wallace, William A., Galileo's Early Notebooks: The Physical Questions (University of Notre Dame Press, 1977), pp. 18–19.

Catholic Church titles
Preceded by Claudio Acquaviva	Superior General of the Society of Jesus; 1615–1645	Succeeded by Vincenzo Carafa
