= San Cosimato =

- Chiesa di San Cosimato
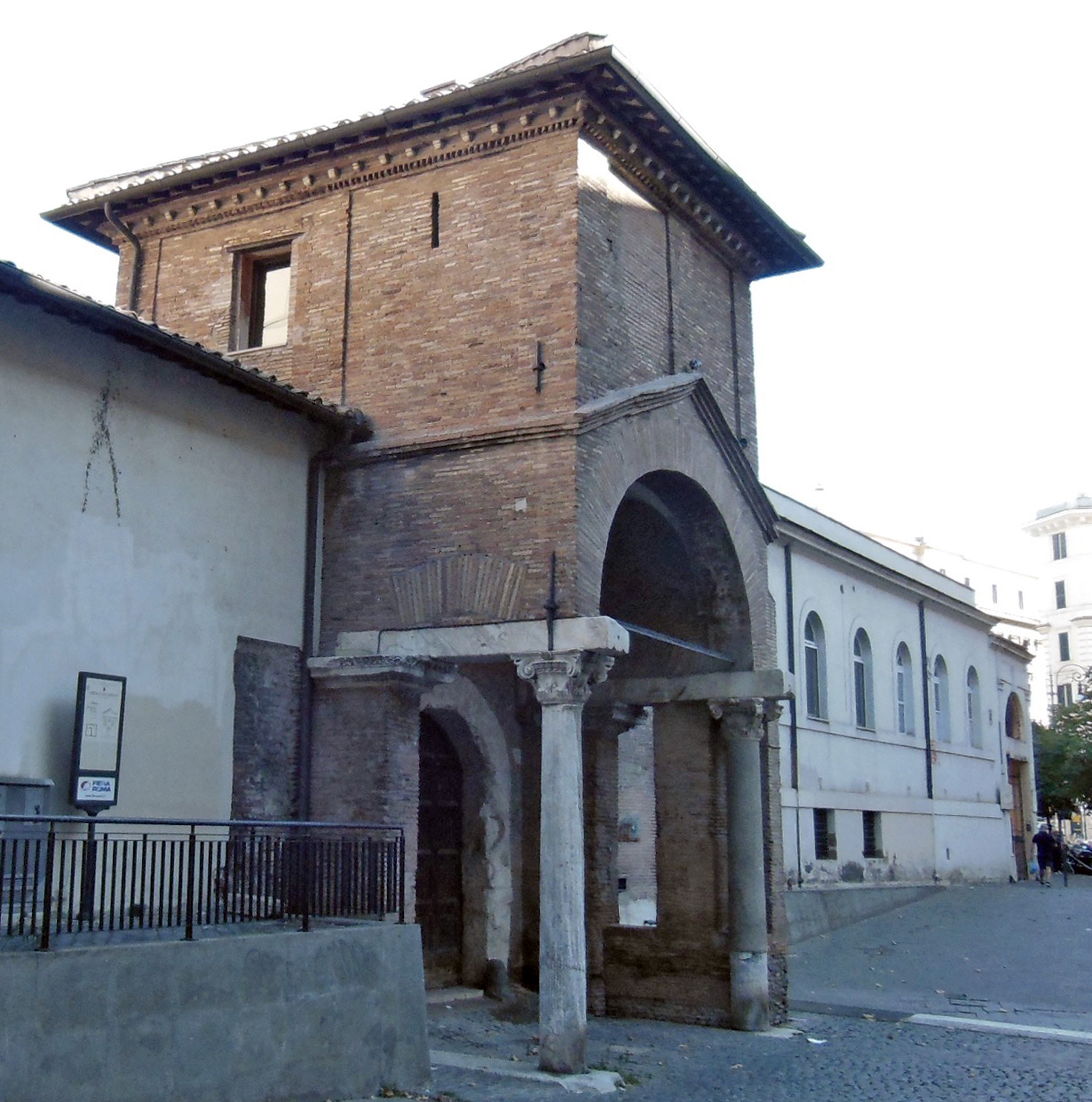
- Portico entrance
- Click on the map for a fullscreen view
- 41.886694°N 12.470306°E
- Location: Trastevere, Rome
- Country: Italy
- Denomination: Roman Catholic

Architecture
- Architectural type: Church
- Groundbreaking: 10th century

San Cosimato (Italian: Chiesa di San Cosimato) is a church located in Rome. It was originally built in the tenth century in Trastevere and now serves as the location for the Presidio Nuovo Regina Margherita, a local hospital. Originally, it was built as a Benedictine monastery dedicated to saints Cosmas and Damian, from whom it derives its name, and it carried the added designation of in mica aure (English: in the golden sand) due to the presence of fluvial sand of yellowish color.

The monastery was transferred from the jurisdiction of the Benedictine Order to that of the nuns known as the Recluses of Saint Damian (Italian: Recluse di san Damiano). From 1233, the church served as a hostel.

Pope Sixtus IV had the church and monastery rebuilt in 1475. After 1870, the convent was fully converted into a hospital. The façade of the former monastery looks upon a public square that is also called San Cosimato. The church has a small Romanesque campanile.

The presbytery contains a fresco called Madonna and Child between Saints Francis and Claire, attributed to Antonio del Massaro.
