= Pietro Francesco Garoli =

Italian painter

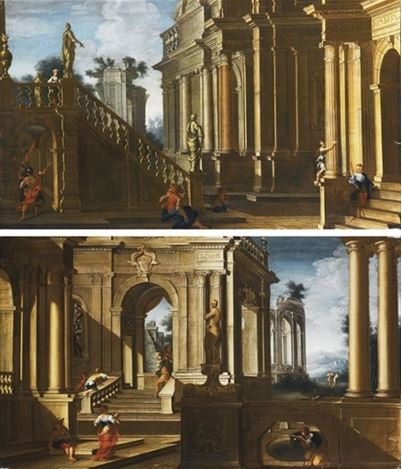
Architectural Perspectives with Figures

Pietro Francesco Garoli, also seen as Garola, Garolo and Carolli or Pier Francesco (1 June 1638, Turin (?) - 5 January 1716, Rome) was an Italian painter and architect; known primarily for vedute and capricci. Some documents give his place of birth as Giaveno (now part of Turin), although that may be where his family was from. The first biographical information about Garoli comes from 1730, fourteen years after his death, and the sources disagree on several details.

== Biography ==
In 1665, he received a large payment for restoring 99 paintings in the collection of the Duchy of Savoy. In 1713, as an architect, he was commissioned by Duke Victor Amadeus to create designs for the University of Turin, which were later executed by Filippo Juvarra.

Lione Pascoli, in his biographical essay, list several study trips Garoli made between 1665 and 1668, to Venice, Bologna and Florence, where he made studies of visual perspective. In particular, he studied the methods of quadratura employed by Girolamo Curti ("Dentone"), Giacomo Antonio Mannini and Angelo Michele Colonna. From 1668 to 1672, he is registered as living at several locations in Rome.

After 1679, he served three terms as a Master of Perspective at the Accademia di San Luca (1679–89, 1689–93 and 1698–1708). During this time, he donated some of his now best-known works to the Accademia; notably Rovine romane (Roman Ruins). Cardinal Fabrizio Spada, an honorary member of the Accademia, acquired his painting David che danza davanti all'arca (David Dancing in Front of the Ark). In 1680 and 1682, he was commissioned to paint views of the interiors of the Basilicas of St. Peter and St. Paul by the Duchess, Maria Giovanna Battista di Savoia-Nemours, which are now in the collection of the Galleria Sabauda.

From 1685 to 1692, he joined with Carlo Rainaldi in a complicated and laborious restoration project at the Chiesa del Santissimo Sudario dei Piemontesi. He is known to have participated in the annual exhibitions at San Salvatore in Lauro at least four times; in 1687, 1693, 1694 and 1698.

He also painted frescoes; notably those recently discovered at the Villa Carpegna, showing scenes from the family estates in Montefeltro. The scenes are painted between fake columns and arcades, in imitation of the style of Baldassarre Peruzzi.

In his will, he donated his instructional materials to Giuseppe Bartolomeo Chiari and the Accademia.
