= Bellarmine =

Bellarmine may refer to:

- Robert Bellarmine (1542–1621), a Cardinal and saint of the Catholic Church
- The schools named after him:
  - Bellarmine University, in Louisville, Kentucky
  - Bellarmine College Preparatory, in San Jose, California
  - Bellarmine Preparatory School, in Tacoma, Washington
  - Bellarmine-Jefferson High School, in Burbank, California
- The Bellarmine Knights, the athletic program of Bellarmine University
- A type of stoneware jug, as known as either a Bellarmine jug or a Bartmann jug
