= Terence Kelly =

Terence or Terry Kelly may refer to:

- Terence Kelly (actor) (born 1944), Canadian actor
- Khalid Kelly (Terence Kelly, 1967–2016), former leader of Al-Mujaharoun in Ireland
- Terry Kelly (chess player) (1930–2010), Irish chess master
- Terry Kelly (singer) (born 1955), Canadian country singer
- Terry Kelly (Irish footballer), Irish football player
- Terry Kelly (hurler) (1934–2019), Irish hurler
- Terry Kelly (English footballer) (1932–2007), English football player
- Terence Darrell Kelly, who was charged with offences relating to the disappearance of Cleo Smith
