= Saint Terence =

The Apostle of the 70

Saint Terence (Terentius, Terentianus) is any of several Christian figures:

- Terence (Terentianus) was, according to his legend, an officer in the Roman Army during the 1st century. He witnessed the death sentencing of Saints Peter and Paul. He became a convert, and was martyred himself, possibly also with his son. His feast day is 25 June.
- Terence was a 1st-century bishop of Iconium. He may have been the Tertius mentioned by Saint Paul the Apostle in Romans 16.22 (although the Wiki article has different feast days), He was martyred. His feast day is 21 June.
- Terentian (d. 118), Bishop of Todi and saint
- Terence, martyred at Carthage during the time of Decius, along with Africanus, Maximus, Pompeius, Zeno, Alexander, and Theodore. Theodosius I transferred their relics to Constantinople.
- Terence of Pesaro (d. ca. 251 AD), patron saint of Pesaro.
- Fidentius and Terence, martyrs c. 305
- Terence of Imola
- Bishop-Martyr Terence Albert O'Brien (1600–1651)

== See also ==
- Saint Terentianus
