= Donna Shaw =

American journalist

- Born: 1951 or 1952
- Other name: Donna Shaw-Bielski
- Education: Pennsylvania State University (B.A.); Biotechnology Fellowships at the University of Maryland's Knight Center for Specialized Journalism and at Virginia Commonwealth University; Columbia University (M.S.)
- Occupations: Journalist; Author; Journalism and Professional Writing department Chair, The College of New Jersey
- Awards: Knight-Bagehot Fellowship, 1998; Keystone Press Award, 2^{nd} place, 1996

Donna J. Shaw is an American journalist, author, and associate professor at The College of New Jersey, where she serves as coordinator of the Journalism and Professional Writing program. She has served on the editorial advisory committee of TCNJ Magazine and as an advisor to The Signal, the college newspaper. A former newspaper reporter and corporate communications manager, she specializes in writing about the impact of money and politics on medical research.

== Education ==
Donna Shaw received her bachelor's degrees in English and journalism from The Pennsylvania State University. She later earned Biotechnology Fellowships at the University of Maryland's Knight Center for Specialized Journalism and at Virginia Commonwealth University.

Shaw was one of nine people awarded a Knight-Bagehot Fellowship in 1998.

At Columbia University, Shaw earned her Master of Science in journalism, and a certificate in economics and business journalism with a concentration in healthcare economics.

== Career ==
=== Journalism ===
Shaw worked as a features journalist for the Philadelphia Bulletin from 1979 to 1982. She later worked for The Philadelphia Inquirer. In 2021, she joined the board for the Chestnut Hill Local.

==== AIDS coverage ====
During her time working for The Philadelphia Inquirer, Shaw learned that Armour Pharmaceutical Company, based in Philadelphia, paid eleven victims US$1,500,000 (equivalent to $3,343,124 in 2025) each in a 1993 confidential settlement that suppressed an internal company report from Dr. Alfred Prince informing them that the treatment employed to sterilize HIV-infected blood products failed.

In 2013, Shaw co-authored a study regarding journalistic coverage in four Sub-Saharan newspapers of HIV and AIDS in South Africa.

In 2017, Shaw co-authored Blood on Their Hands: How Greedy Companies, Inept Bureaucracy, and Bad Science Killed Thousands of Hemophiliacs with lawyer Eric Weinberg, which focused on the iatrogenesis caused by tainted blood provided to haemophilia patients during the AIDS epidemic. While the book was criticized for its pacing and "uneven and cumbersome" writing, it was also highly recommended for both academic and general readers.

=== Teaching ===
Shaw has served as an associate professor at The College of New Jersey, where she also held the position of Chair of the Journalism and Professional Writing department. One of the department's projects during her tenure was a collaboration with The Philadelphia Inquirer to implement computer-assisted reporting which led to a December 2009 series of articles on criminal justice.

== Select publications ==
=== Books ===
- Pollock, John C.; D'Angelo, Paul; Burd, Amanda; et al. (April 26, 2023). "African Newspaper Coverage of AIDS and Community Structure Theory: Comparing New Models of Press-State Relations with Structural Factors in Sub-Saharan Anglophone Africa". In Ngwainmbi, Emmanuel K.; Manda, Levi Zeleza (eds.). Theory, Practice, and Guidelines for Communicating Health and Pandemics in Africa. Cambridge Scholars Publishing. pp. 79–123. ISBN 9781527502284.
- D'Angelo, Paul; Shaw, Donna (May 22, 2018). "11. Journalism as Framing". In Vos, Tim P. (ed.). Journalism. Handbooks of Communication Science. Vol. 19. De Gruyter Brill. pp. 205–234. ISBN 9781501510380.
- Weinberg, Eric; Shaw, Donna (2017). Blood on Their Hands: How Greedy Companies, Inept Bureaucracy, and Bad Science Killed Thousands of Hemophiliacs. Rutgers University Press. doi:10.2307/j.ctt1w1vm2g. ISBN 9780813576220.

=== Magazine articles ===
- Shaw, Donna (February–March 2008). "Wikipedia in the newsroom". American Journalism Review. No. 90. pp. 40–45. ProQuest 216870208. Archived from the original on February 9, 2014.
- Shaw, Donna (June–July 2007). "A Fading Taboo". American Journalism Review. No. 85. pp. 34–39. Archived from the original on December 7, 2013.
- Shaw, Donna (April–May 2007). "Really Local". American Journalism Review. No. 84. pp. 54–57. Archived from the original on July 31, 2014.
- Shaw, Donna (April–May 2007). "Slow to React". American Journalism Review. No. 84. pp. 12–13. Archived from the original on July 31, 2014.
- Shaw, Donna (October–November 2007). "Online scoops". American Journalism Review. No. 81. pp. 58–60. Archived from the original on July 31, 2014.
- Shaw, Donna (October–November 2007). "The Pulitzer Cartel". American Journalism Review. No. 81. pp. 40–47. Archived from the original on July 31, 2014.
- Shaw, Donna (June–July 2006). "Remaking the Front Page". American Journalism Review. No. 79. pp. 25–31. Archived from the original on July 31, 2014.
- Shaw, Donna (February–March 2006). "Dilemma of Interest". American Journalism Review. No. 77. pp. 56–61. Archived from the original on August 1, 2014.
- Shaw, Donna (February–March 2006). "The World Needs What We Do". American Journalism Review. p. 25 – via The Free Library.

=== Newspaper articles ===
During her 17 years writing for The Philadelphia Inquirer, Shaw authored hundreds of bylined articles. A brief selection:

- Shaw, Donna (January 9, 2000). "FDA official says Fen-Phen memo misused at trials". The Philadelphia Inquirer. p. E1. ProQuest 1844343548.
- Shaw, Donna (September 9, 1999). "FDA had full knowledge of diet drugs, witness says: Wyeth's former product-safety executive doesn't explain a tardy label change, but says the company hid nothing". The Philadelphia Inquirer. p. C1. ProQuest 1843896052.
- Shaw, Donna (May 13, 1996). "Drug for Lou Gherig's Disease may be on track for FDA approval". The Philadelphia Inquirer. p. C1. ProQuest 1842192416.
- Shaw, Donna (March 25, 1996). "FDA OKs tests of preventative AIDS vaccine". The Philadelphia Inquirer. p. N6. ProQuest 281718651.
- Shaw, Donna (April 16, 1995). "On the trail of tainted blood: Hemophiliacs say U.S. could have prevented their contracting AIDS". The Philadelphia Inquirer. p. E1. ProQuest 1840820651.
- Shaw, Donna (May 30, 1994). "Working out on the streets while waiting for the FDA: A new test for AIDS awaits action. Many are mad". The Philadelphia Inquirer. p. D1. ProQuest 1840763465.
- Shaw, Donna (May 27, 1992). "FDA Eases the Way for Gene-Altered Food: The Agency's New Policy Could Result in a New Tomato by Next Year". The Philadelphia Inquirer. p. A1. ProQuest 1838003827.
- Shaw, Donna (October 7, 1991). "Study: FDA Can't Stop Americans From Being Poisoned". The Philadelphia Inquirer. p. A1. ProQuest 1836994195.
- Shaw, Donna (January 6, 1983). "Showing How to Aid Rape Victims". The Philadelphia Inquirer. p. N2. ProQuest 1814331163.

== Awards ==
Shaw was nominated by The Philadelphia Inquirer three times for a Pulitzer Prize, twice for health reporting.

She received the second place 1996 Keystone Press Award for Public Service/Investigative Reporting in Division I, in acknowledgement of her work on The Philadelphia Inquirer series "Blood, Money and AIDS".

She won the Journalism Service Award from the Delaware Valley chapter of the National Hemophilia Foundation.
