= Terri Thompson =

Terri Thompson is an American business journalist and former director of the Knight-Bagehot Fellowship in Economics and Business Journalism at Columbia Graduate School of Journalism.

== Biography ==
Prior to joining Columbia University in 1993, she was an associate editor in the New York bureau of U.S. News & World Report, where she covered business, finance and the economy for five years. A former Knight-Bagehot Fellow, she began her journalism career in 1974 as an administrative assistant at Cahners Publishing Co., a trade magazine published in Boston. She was promoted in 1976 to news editor of Purchasing Magazine, where she covered business and labor.

Thompson spent the 1980-81 academic year as a Bagehot Fellow at Columbia and two years later graduated with honors from New York University, earning a degree in business. She earned a Master of Science in Journalism from Columbia in 1998.

In 1981, she joined BusinessWeek in New York as staff editor of the corporate finance section. In 1984, she was promoted to real estate editor, and in 1986 she became energy editor. She joined Institutional Investor in 1987 as a senior editor responsible for editorial theme and annual supplements.

Thompson is the author of Biz Kids' Guide to Success: Money-Making Ideas for Young Entrepreneurs (Barrons, 1992) and editor of Writing About Business: The New Columbia Knight-Bagehot Guide to Economics and Business Journalism (Columbia University Press, 2001). She hosted "Dollar for Dollar," a public service television program produced by New York State Society of Certified Public Accountants (NYSSCPA).

A former president of the New York Financial Writers' Association, Thompson is the recipient of numerous journalism awards, including the NYFWA's Elliott V. Bell award for making a significant, long-term contribution to the profession of financial journalism.

She lives in New York, New Jersey and Connecticut with her husband, the Rev. Ralph Acerno (sometimes known as "The Rockin' Reverend.")
