= Knight-Bagehot Fellowship Program =

Columbia University scholarship

The Knight-Bagehot Fellowship Program in Economics and Business Journalism was created at Columbia University in the City of New York in response to the growing public interest in financial news and the increasing demand for trained editors and reporters to cover the field of business and economics. The Fellowship offers free tuition plus a $70,000 stipend.

== History ==
In 1975, under the leadership of Dean Elie Abel, the Columbia Graduate School of Journalism sought to address the problem of deficiencies in business news coverage by establishing the Walter Bagehot (pronounced badge-it) Fellowship, an intensive year-long program of instruction in economics and business for working journalists. The co-founding directors were Stephen B. Shepard and Soma Golden Behr. Also serving as directors were Christopher J. Welles (1977-1985); Mary Bralove (1985-1987); Pamela Hollie Kluge (1987-1990) and Pauline Tai (1990-1993). Terri Thompson served from 1993-2018, when she retired. Raju Narisetti was director from 2018-2019. Ann Grimes was director from 2020-2021. Robert Smith, the current director of the program, took the position in July 2021.

Originally named in honor of the 19th-century economist and editor of The Economist, it was renamed the Knight-Bagehot Fellowship in 1987 in recognition of the John S. and James L. Knight-Foundation's $3 million gift as an endowment for the program.

Today, the Knight-Bagehot Fellowship is the only academic full-time degree-granting mid-career program for journalists devoted to the study of business and economics. Fellows receive full tuition and a living stipend to attend Columbia for one academic year. The chief criterion for selection is demonstrated journalistic excellence. Between 1975 and 2020, nearly 400 journalists completed the program.

== Directors (past and present) ==
- Stephen Shepard (1975–1976)
- Soma Golden Behr (1976–1977)
- Chris Welles (1977–1985)
- Mary Bralove (1985–1987)
- Pamela Hollie Kluge (1987–1990)
- Pauline Tai (1990–1993)
- Terri Thompson (1993–2018)
- Raju Narisetti (2018–2019)
- Ann Grimes (2020–2021)
- Robert Smith (2021-2026)
- Pallavi Gogoi (Started August 2026)

== Notable alumni ==
- Julia Angwin
- John Authers
- Janet Bodnar
- Neill Borowski
- David Cho
- Gail Collins
- Kate Davidson
- Barbara Demick
- Emmanuel K. Dogbevi
- Liza Featherstone
- Karl Taro Greenfeld
- Gail Gregg
- Jan Hopkins
- Dawn Kissi
- Mara Liasson
- Dave Lindorff
- Phillip Longman
- Amanda Macias
- Larry Madowo
- Floyd Norris
- Donna Rosato
- John Saunders
- Anya Schiffrin
- Donna Shaw-Bielski
- Seth Stevenson
- Craig Torres
- Ann Scott Tyson
- Mary Williams Walsh
- David Wessel
- Gerri Willis
- Christine Young-Pertel
