= Jacob Sullum =

American journalist (born 1965)

Jacob Z. Sullum
- Born: September 5, 1965 (age 60); Wilkes-Barre, Pennsylvania, United States
- Education: Cornell University
- Occupation: syndicated newspaper columnist
- Employer: Creators Syndicate
- Known for: focuses on shrinking the realm of politics and expanding individual choice
- Notable work: Reason magazine
- Spouse: married
- Children: 3 daughters

Jacob Z. Sullum (born September 5, 1965) is a syndicated newspaper columnist with Creators Syndicate and a senior editor at Reason magazine. He focuses most of his writings on shrinking the realm of politics and expanding individual choice. He was interviewed in the 2004 documentary Super Size Me.

Sullum is a native of Wilkes-Barre, Pennsylvania.

== Career ==
Sullum writes a weekly column distributed nationally. He has contributed essays to The Wall Street Journal, USA Today, The New York Times, the Los Angeles Times, the San Francisco Chronicle, Cigar Aficionado, and National Review, among many others.

Sullum has been a frequent guest on many TV and radio programs. He has appeared on Fox News Channel, CNN, The O'Reilly Factor, Hardball, Paula Zahn Now, The Charlie Rose Show, and NPR while also speaking at the International Conference on Drug Policy Reform and the Conference on Computers, Freedom, and Privacy.

When Sullum first joined Reason in 1989, he was an assistant editor. He eventually worked his way up to becoming an associate editor and managing editor. He previously worked as an editor for National Review and a reporter for the News and Courier/Evening Post in Charleston, South Carolina.

== Personal ==
Sullum obtained his degree from Cornell University, where he majored in economics and psychology. During his time in schools, he was an editor and columnist for The Cornell Daily Sun. He is a fellow of the Knight Center for Specialized Journalism. Sullum is married and together they have three daughters and two dogs. The family resides in Dallas, Texas.

== Views ==
Sullum is for a non-interventionist foreign policy and has defended then-presidential candidate Ron Paul stating that it is inaccurate to call him an isolationist. Sullum has also made the case that Presidents, including 45th U.S. President Donald Trump, have been reckless with the lives of soldiers.

== Awards and honors ==
Over the span of his career, Sullum's work has won a handful of awards which include:

- Thomas S. Szasz Award – 2004
- Sullum won the Keystone Press Award for investigative reporting – 1988
- First Prize in the Felix Morley Memorial Journalism Competition – 1991
- National Magazine Award for his Reason cover story about treating pain – 1998
- Drug Policy Alliance's Edward M. Brecher Award for Achievement in the Field of Journalism – 2005
- Won first place for commentary or feature in the Southern California Journalism Awards for "Thank Deng Xiaoping for Little Girls" – 2007

== Bibliography ==
- For Your Own Good: The Anti-Smoking Crusade and the Tyranny of Public Health (1998) (ISBN 0-684-82736-0)
- Saying Yes: In Defense of Drug Use (2003) (ISBN 1-58542-318-1), in which he puts forward the term voodoo pharmacology, a hotly debated subject.
