= TCNJ School of Engineering =

School of Engineering The College of New Jersey
- Type: Public
- Dean: Andrea Welker
- Undergraduates: ~650
- Location: Ewing, New Jersey, United States; 40.269899°N 74.778614°W
- Campus: Suburban
- Website: tcnj.edu/~engsci

TCNJ School of Engineering is one of seven schools at The College of New Jersey, consisting of roughly 650 students centered in Armstrong Hall. It offers several undergraduate programs in various engineering disciplines including the traditional mechanical, electrical, and civil engineering fields, but also extending to newer fields such as computer and biomedical engineering. An Order of the Engineer chapter was started in Spring 2009 for all graduating seniors.

== Faculty ==
The current dean of the school is Dr. Andrea Welker, who started this role in 2022. The mechanical engineering department is chaired by Dr. Karen Yan; the electrical and computer engineering departments are chaired by Dr. Anthony Deese; the civil engineering department is chaired by Dr. Andrew Bechtel, and the biomedical engineering department is chaired by Dr. Christopher Wagner. The Department of Integrative STEM Education is chaired by Dr. Manuel Figuroa.

== Programs and academics ==
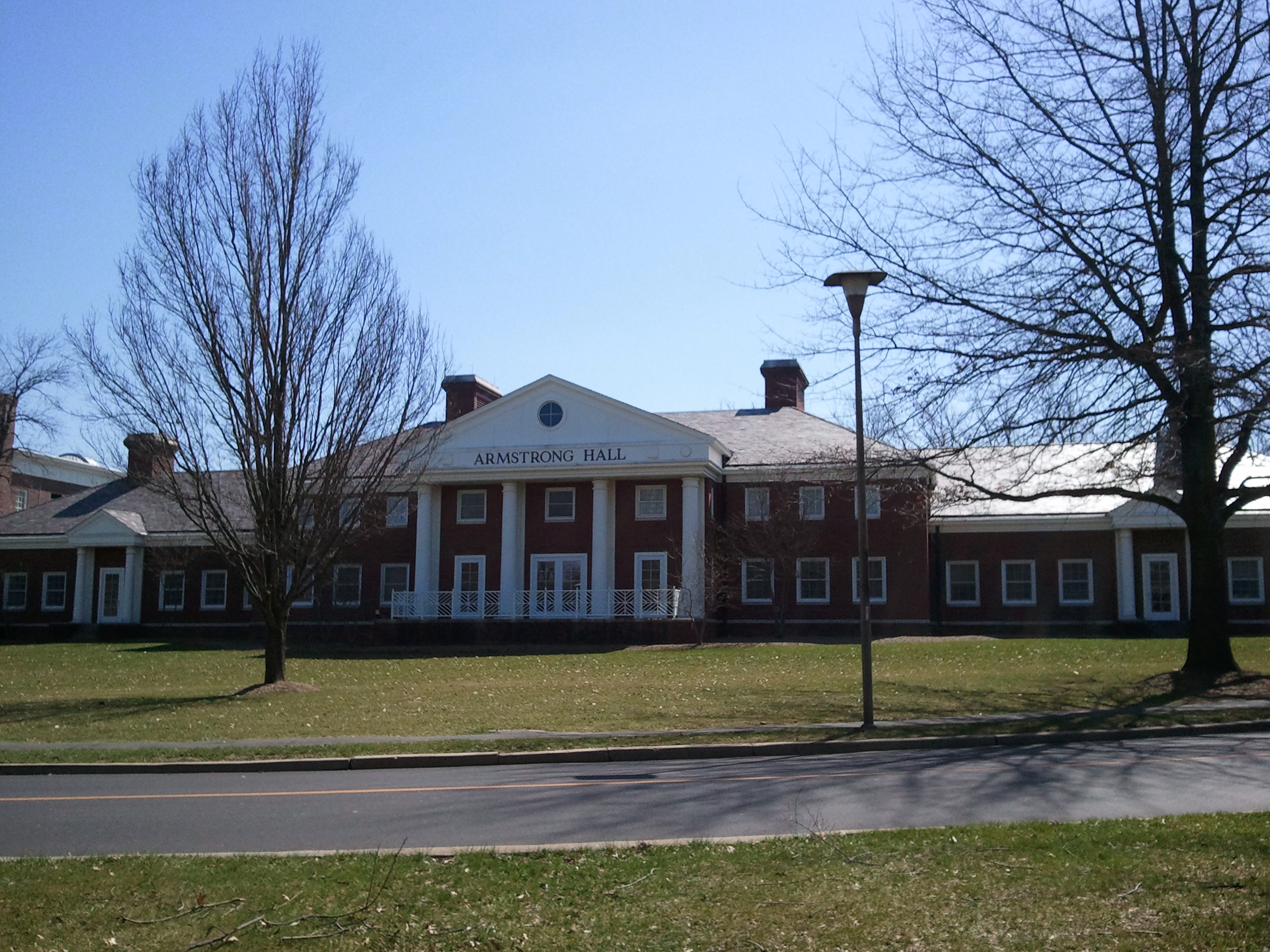
School of Engineering is centered in Armstrong Hall.

TCNJ's School of Engineering offers the following programs and degrees.

=== Department of Biomedical Engineering ===
- Bachelor of science (BS) in biomedical engineering

The biomedical engineering program at The College of New Jersey is relatively young, having its first graduating class in 2007.

=== Department of Civil Engineering ===
- Bachelor of science (BS) in civil engineering

=== Department of Electrical and Computer Engineering ===
- Bachelor of science (BS) in electrical engineering
- Bachelor of science (BS) in computer engineering
- Bachelor of science (BS) in engineering science, engineering management specialization, with an electrical engineering preference

=== Department of Mechanical Engineering ===
- Bachelor of science (BS) in mechanical engineering
- Bachelor of science (BS) in engineering science, engineering management specialization, with a mechanical engineering preference

=== Department of Integrative STEM Education ===
- Bachelor of science (BS) in technology education
- Bachelor of arts (BA) in integrative STEM (i-STEM), with a specialization in early childhood, elementary, or deaf and hard of hearing education

== Students ==
Like most of the nation's engineering schools, the School of Engineering at TCNJ is predominantly male, but at approximately 25% female it has one of the highest percentages of women in the nation. Additionally, 25% of TCNJ engineers are minorities.

Student-run organizations within the School of Engineering include the Institute of Electrical and Electronics Engineers, the American Society of Civil Engineers, the American Society of Mechanical Engineers, the Biomedical Engineering Society, the National Society of Black Engineers, the Society of Hispanic Professional Engineers, and the Society of Women Engineers, among others.

== Courses and facilities ==
Like many engineering schools, the course load can be very heavy, with most students requiring exemptions from college credit limits to fulfill a four-year graduation plan. The traditional mechanical and electrical engineering departments focus almost entirely on courses within the engineering department - typically only the minimum number of non-engineering courses required for graduation can be taken without deviating from a four-year plan. Other programs, such as the computer and biomedical engineering and engineering management fields include courses from other departments (computer science, biology, and business, respectively).

Armstrong Hall contains two general purpose computer labs, two electrical/computer engineering labs with radiofrequency, optics, imaging, control systems, and other specialized sub-rooms, a robotics lab, woodshop, two machine shops, a thermofluids lab, a materials (and separate biomaterials) lab, a windtunnel, and number of other facilities.

The STEM building is the latest edition to the TCNJ School of Engineering. This facility was developed to cultivate learning and to prepare students for future work in the STEM fields. Former TCNJ president Gitenstein said, "These facilities are helping us prepare a new generation of graduates for the demands of the STEM economy." The building has multiple modern biomedical engineering, mechanical engineering, and computer science laboratories.

Armstrong Hall has recently been renovated in a similar manner to the STEM building. The renovation has finished in the end of 2019.

== Senior Capstone Project ==
All graduating seniors in programs intended to procure a BS degree are required to do a senior capstone project. Projects can be performed in a group or individually. The project is divided into two courses, "Senior project I" and "Senior project II" and includes a formal presentation at the end of each course. Many graduating students consider the senior capstone project to be the most intensive coursework in the engineering department at TCNJ - stories of students being evicted from the engineering building at odds hours of the night and early morning by campus police while working on their senior projects are popular. The nature of the senior project is left to the discretion of the student, although each project must have an advisor to help guide the students in their research. A passing grade in the senior project is required for graduation.

Many students choose to work on projects that may be entered in national or international competitions, most of which occur before the end of the school year. Some popular examples of these are:

- Baja SAE
- Solar Splash
- SAE Aerodesign
- NASA Great Moonbuggy Race
- IEEE High Efficiency Power Amplifier Design Competition
- New Jersey Autonomous Vehicle (NJAV) for Competition in the IGVC
- Micromouse
- Engineers Without Borders related project

Many senior projects are multi-disciplinary, requiring one or more students from both the mechanical and electrical/computer engineering departments. Projects are displayed for the community during "Student Achievement Day" at the end of the spring semester of each year.

== Post-graduation ==
TCNJ Engineering students who pursue post-graduation employment enjoy a near 100% placement rate within 6 months of graduation. Many students choose to remain within New Jersey, where major employers of TCNJ graduates include AECOM, Boeing, Johnson & Johnson, Lockheed Martin, Merck, PSE&G, York International, and the U.S. Army CECOM (Communications and Electronics Command). Many students choose to pursue a graduate degree as well, with Columbia University, University of Pennsylvania, Princeton University, Drexel University, and others being popular.

== See also ==
- TCNJ School of Business
