= Emmanuel K. Dogbevi =

Ghanaian investigative journalist

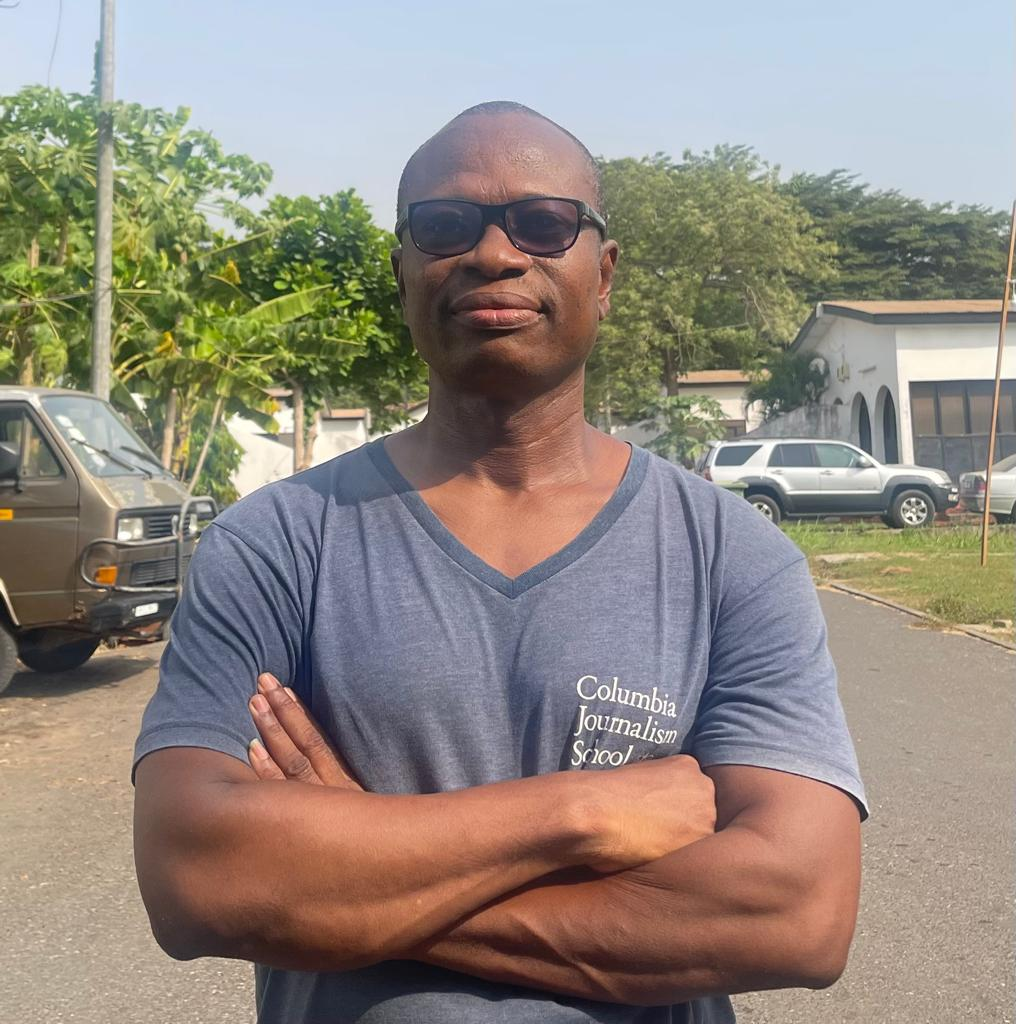
- Emmanuel K. Dogbevi
- Born: Emmanuel K. Dogbevi; Accra, Ghana
- Education: Columbia University & University of Ghana
- Occupation: Investigative journalist
- Years active: 1990–present
- Known for: Ghana Business News

Emmanuel K. Dogbevi is a Ghanaian investigative journalist widely recognized for his extensive work on anti-corruption, electronic waste, and the exploitation of natural resources in Ghana. He serves as the founding and managing editor of the Ghana Business News portal and the executive director at the NewsBridge Africa, a non-profit media organization committed to fostering journalistic excellence across Africa. He is the deputy chairperson of The Africa Editors Forum.

== Education ==
Emmanuel is a Knight-Bagehot Fellow for Economics and Business Journalism at the Columbia University in the United States. He graduated from there in 2014 with a master's in journalism. He received his Bachelor of Arts degree in sociology from the University of Ghana in 2007. Prior to that, he attempted twice to pass O' Level in 1993 and 1996, and after an entrance exam, he gained admission into the University of Ghana in 1999 to pursue a Diploma in the Study of Religions.

== Career ==
Emmanuel K. Dogbevi is the founder and managing editor of the business news website ghanabusinessnews.com, which he launched in 2008. In 2014, he established NewsBridge Africa, a non-profit organization dedicated to training young journalists in the field of investigative journalism. In 2026, he was re-elected as the deputy chairperson of The Africa Editors Forum after initially being elected in the same position in 2024 during their bi-annual general meeting held concurrently with the Africa Media Festival in Nairobi, Kenya. Before his current roles, he worked with the online departments of both Joy FM and Citi FM. Additionally, Dogbevi played a significant role at the Independent newspaper, where he ascended to the position of production editor. His journey in journalism started in 1990, when he began as an editorial intern at Step Magazine, a religious publication.

=== The Journalism Hangout ===
Dogbevi’s Journalism Hangout began on May 3, 2019, as a modest and cost-effective initiative to informally train journalists. At each hangout, journalists and other professionals share experiences, meals and drinks while discussing practical ways of improving professionalism in the media, strengthening fact-checking, and harnessing modern tools, including Artificial Intelligence (AI), to raise the standard of journalism. The gatherings provide a friendly atmosphere built on trust, where participants openly exchange ideas and learn from one another.

Since its inception, Dogbevi has organised The Journalism Hangout in several cities across Ghana, including Accra, Kumasi, Sunyani, Koforidua, Tamale, Walewale, Ho, and Takoradi.

== Notable investigative works ==
Emmanuel has undertaken numerous investigative projects spanning Ghana and other African countries in collaboration with international investigative organizations. Some of his works include;

=== Illegal rosewood logging in Ghana ===
Dogbevi conducted investigative research on illicit rosewood logging in Ghana, presenting his findings in two reports. The initial publication, titled "The Rape of Rosewood in Ghana," exposes the Chinese discovery of Ghana's rosewood during the construction of a hydropower dam at Bui in 2017. This work delves into the scale of the trade, its environmental impact, and the consequent government-imposed bans on the trade. The second segment, titled "Ghana and the Rosewood Curse," reveals how the forest has been depleted and highlighted how state officials and political appointees are preventing community interventions. His investigation also revealed the minimal financial benefits to local communities, despite Ghana appearing to profit, and emphasized the discrepancy between Ghana's reported rosewood export figures and China's import figures.

=== West Africa leaks ===
A team of 13 journalists collaborated on a leaked document within a cross-border West African region, bringing to light the business practices of Dr. Kwame Bawuah-Edusei, a former Ghanaian ambassador to the United States. The investigation exposed the ambassador's involvement in business activities, where he registered his oil company across multiple offshore jurisdictions, using deliberate strategies to evade tax responsibilities in Ghana.

=== E-waste ===
Regarded as a pioneering Ghanaian journalist, he is credited as one of the earliest reporters to bring attention to the environmental and health effects of electronic waste. His investigative work significantly contributed to the introduction of legislation and regulations governing the control and management of e-waste movement and disposal in Ghana, thereby addressing the pressing issues associated with electronic waste and hazardous materials.

=== Indian Companies Are Bringing One of the World's Most Toxic Industries to Africa ===
Indian companies are setting up lead battery recycling plants in several African countries, including Congo, Kenya, Ghana and Nigeria, which have led to environmental and health concerns. These factories expose local populations to dangerous levels of lead contamination, particularly affecting children with severe health risks like brain damage and respiratory issues. Despite economic benefits such as jobs and tax revenue, the operations often fail to follow safety and environmental regulations, leading to polluted air, soil, and water. This practice exemplifies environmental injustice, as hazardous industries are shifted from wealthier nations to areas with weaker regulatory frameworks, harming vulnerable communities. This story was published in partnership with The Museba Project, Ghana Business News, and Grist

=== Pandora Papers: The Israelis making millions in Ghana from government contracts ===
Dogbevi conducted investigations into Ghana's development goals that led to generous tax holidays and procurement laws allowing single-source contracts for major infrastructure projects, attracting foreign companies seeking lucrative deals without competitive bidding. One of such companies identified was Amandi Holdings, an offshore firm registered in the British Virgin Islands, owned by Israeli brothers Refael, Eyal, and Moshe Edry, whose names appear in the Pandora Papers. Amandi has secured numerous contracts in Ghana across various sectors, including IT, construction, energy, elections, railways, and airports, often through single-sourcing. The leaked documents reveal how Amandi benefits from tax exemptions while making substantial profits.

== Awards and honours ==
=== Awards ===
He has won several awards, both in Ghana and abroad. Some of them are:

Year	Organisation	Category	Results
2025	2024 EPPY Award	Best Business Reporting (fewer than 1 million unique visitors)	Second
2024	National Association of Black Journalists	Digital Media – International Reporting: Single Story News	Won
2022	Columbia Journalism School	Christopher J. Welles Memorial Prize	Won
2019	Media Foundation for West Africa	West Africa Media Excellence Conference and Awards	Finalist
2012	Ghana Journalist Association	GJA Best Report on Anti-Corruption	Won
1994	Ghana National Commission on Children	Media Features on Children Awards	Won

=== Honours ===
- Dogbevi received the African Capacity Building Foundation Award at the AllAfrica Media Leaders’ Summit 2024, held in Nairobi, Kenya.
- The National Press Foundation honored Dogbevi and the two other reporters who worked on the story with the 2024 Heinrich Böll Foundation Award for Distinguished Reporting on Trade

=== Works in publications ===
Emmanuel's contributions have been cited in various global academic journals, articles, and books. Notably, one of his photographs on e-waste was used by the National Geographic, highlighting the widespread impact and significance of his work. Others include;

- Ghana: One Decade of a Liberal State, edited by Prof. Kwame Boafo Arthur
- Biochar for Environmental Management: Science and Technology, edited by Johannes Lehmann and Stephen Joseph
- Mediterranean Journal of Social Sciences Vol. 4 (1) January 2013
- GeoJournal: Assessing land use and land cover change in the Wassa West District of Ghana using remote sensing.
- Global land acquisition: neo-colonialism or development opportunity?
