= Kate Davidson =

American journalist

Kate Davidson is an American economics news reporter.

== Career ==
As of May 2022, she is a reporter covering business and economics for Oregon Public Broadcasting. Previously she was a contributor to American Public Media's radio program Marketplace.

Davidson covered the U.S. economy and the Federal Reserve for The Wall Street Journal from January 2015 to October 2021.

She previously held roles at Politico, American Banker, the Congressional Quarterly and the Concord Monitor.

== Education ==
Davidson earned a master's degree from the University of California, Berkeley, and a master's degree from Columbia University. At Columbia, she was a Knight-Bagehot Fellow in Economics and Business Journalism. She earned her undergraduate degree at Boston University after transferring from Fordham University.

== Awards ==
In 2021, she won the national Edward R. Murrow Award for her ongoing coverage of the economic impact of the COVID-19 pandemic entitled The pandemic's economic fallout in Oregon.

She won her first national Edward R. Murrow award for her 2005 National Public Radio documentary "Saints and Indians" about the experiences of Navajo children sent to live with white Mormon families across the West.

While studying at Columbia, she was a Knight-Bagehot Fellow in Economics and Business Journalism.
