= Richard Wolffe =

British-American journalist

- Born: 17 September 1968 (age 58); Birmingham, England
- Education: Oxford University
- Occupation: Journalist
- Notable credit: MSNBC
- Spouse: Paula Cuello

Richard L. Wolffe (born 17 September 1968) is a British and American journalist, MSNBC commentator, and author of the Barack Obama books Renegade: The Making of a President (Crown, June 2009) and Revival: The Struggle for Survival Inside the Obama White House (Crown, November 2010). Richard Wolffe is a US columnist for The Guardian. He was most recently vice-president and executive editor of MSNBC.com.

== Early life and journalism career ==
Wolffe was born to an English father and a Moroccan mother in Birmingham, England, where he attended the fee-paying independent King Edward's School. He is Jewish. He graduated from Oxford University in 1992 with classification#First-class honours|first-class honours]] in English and French literature.

Wolffe took the Westminster Press diploma in journalism, starting with the pre-entry course at Hastings in autumn 1992 while a trainee reporter with the Brighton Argus.

Wolffe was a senior journalist at the Financial Times, serving as its deputy bureau chief and US diplomatic correspondent in Washington. He reported on US foreign policy, covered the Microsoft antitrust trial, as well as regulatory and business issues at the US Department of the Treasury, the Federal Trade Commission and the Securities and Exchange Commission.

Wolffe covered the length of Barack Obama's 2008 presidential campaign for Newsweek magazine, travelling with the candidate and his inner circle from his announcement through election day, 21 months later.

Wolffe is a political analyst on MSNBC, having appeared frequently on Countdown with Keith Olbermann and Hardball with Chris Matthews. On NBC, he was featured as a political commentator on Meet The Press and TODAY. He features prominently in the forthcoming HBO documentary on the Obama campaign, and played a leading role in the HBO documentary of the 2000 Bush campaign, Journeys with George. He has also appeared on CNN and Fox News, as well as international media including British, Canadian and Australian television.

As Newsweek's senior White House correspondent, his cover stories included "What He Believes" (on Obama's faith), "Black & White" (about Obama and racial politics), "Bush in the Bubble" (after Hurricane Katrina), and "Weight of the World" (how Bush handled the Lebanon War). Wolffe joined Newsweek in November 2002 as diplomatic correspondent, covering foreign policy and international affairs. In the 2004 presidential election, he covered the Howard Dean campaign before switching to John Kerry.

In April 2009, he joined Public Strategies Inc, a corporate-strategies firm run by Dan Bartlett, as senior strategist. In July 2009, Wolffe guest-hosted a few episodes of Countdown with Keith Olbermann and came under fire from liberal bloggers and writers because of that position. "Having Richard Wolffe host an MSNBC program — or serving as an almost daily 'political analyst' — is exactly tantamount to MSNBC's just turning over an hour every night to a corporate lobbyist", wrote Salon columnist Glenn Greenwald. Olbermann apologised, claiming he was caught "flat-footed" and announcing that Wolffe would not appear on Countdown until his activities outside of MSNBC were reviewed. On 1 October 2009, Wolffe appeared on Countdown, discussing Sarah Palin. Olbermann wrote at Daily Kos that "the broadcast network's very tough practices exec vetted this other job (and as indicated, the work he's done for us), found no interrelation". Wolffe left Public Strategies in December 2009.

Wolffe continues to be a regular guest on numerous MSNBC shows, including Hardball with Chris Matthews.

In October 2012, it was announced Wolffe would serve as VP and executive editor of MSNBC.com, scheduled to launch in early 2013. He also lectures at many universities and institutes. In September 2009, Wolffe lectured on the topic Who is Barack Obama at the New Hampshire Institute of Politics at Saint Anselm College.

On the edition of 29 January 2013 of The Last Word with Lawrence O'Donnell, Wolffe mentioned that he had recently become a naturalised US citizen, although he did not give a specific date.

== Other work ==
Wolffe is the co-author of The Victim's Fortune (HarperCollins, 2002), about the deals that led to billions of dollars in compensation to the Nazis' victims in the late 1990s, and the author of a book on Obama's campaign called Renegade: The Making of a President.

He co-authored two Spanish cookbooks, Tapas: A Taste of Spain in America (Clarkson Potter in the US and Planeta in Spain, 2005) and Made in Spain: Spanish Dishes for the American Kitchen (Clarkson Potter, 2008). He has also written for food magazines such as Food Arts and Food & Wine.

Wolffe had a cameo in the 2013 motion picture The Incredible Burt Wonderstone.

== Bibliography ==
- Andrés, José; Wolffe, Richard (September 2018). We Fed an Island: The True Story of Rebuilding Puerto Rico, One Meal at a Time. Anthony Bourdain/Ecco. ISBN 978-0062864482.
- Wolffe, Richard (September 2013). The Message: The Reselling of President Obama. Twelve. ISBN 978-1455581566.
- Wolffe, Richard (November 2010). Revival: The Struggle for Survival Inside the Obama White House. Crown Publishing Group. ISBN 978-0-307-71741-2.
- Wolffe, Richard (June 2009). Renegade: The Making of a President. Crown Publishing Group. ISBN 978-0-307-46312-8.
- Andrés, José; Wolffe, Richard (November 2008). Made in Spain: Spanish Dishes for the American Kitchen. Clarkson Potter. ISBN 978-0-307-38263-4.
- Andrés, José; Wolffe, Richard (November 2005). Tapas: A Taste Of Spain In America. Clarkson Potter. ISBN 978-1-4000-5359-9.
- Authers, John; Wolffe, Richard (July 2003). The Victim's Fortune: Inside the Epic Battle Over the Debts of the Holocaust. HarperCollins. ISBN 978-0-06-093687-7.
