= The College of New Jersey =

Public university in Ewing Township, New Jersey, US

- Former name: List: New Jersey State Normal School (1855–1908); New Jersey State Normal School in Trenton (1908–1929); New Jersey State Teachers College and State Normal School at Trenton (1929–1937); New Jersey State Teachers College at Trenton (1937–1958); Trenton State College (1958–1996)
- Motto: Essayez (French)
- Motto in English: "Try"
- Type: Public university
- Established: 1855; 171 years ago
- Accreditation: MSCHE
- Academic affiliations: Sea-grant, Space-grant
- Endowment: $71.8 million (2025)
- Chair: Gloria E. Weissbart
- President: Michael Bernstein
- Provost: Margo DelliCarpini
- Faculty: 821 (347 full time, 474 adjunct)
- Students: 7,340
- Undergraduates: 6,653
- Postgraduates: 687
- Location: Ewing, New Jersey, United States; 40.2712°N 74.7829°W
- Campus: Suburban, 289 acres (117 ha)
- Annual: Seal
- Newspaper: The Signal
- Colors: Navy Blue; Gold
- Nickname: TCNJ Lions
- Sporting affiliations: NCAA Division III – NJAC
- Mascot: Roscoe the Lion
- Website: tcnj.edu

The College of New Jersey (TCNJ) is a public university in Ewing Township, New Jersey, United States. It is part of New Jersey's public system of higher education. Established in 1855 as the New Jersey State Normal School, TCNJ was the first normal school, or teaching college, in the state of New Jersey and the fifth in the United States. It was originally located in Trenton proper and moved to its present location in adjacent Ewing Township during the early to mid-1930s. Since its inception, TCNJ has undergone several name changes, the most recent being the 1996 change from "Trenton State College" to its current name.

The institution is organized into seven schools, all of which offer bachelor's degree programs and several of which offer master's degree programs. Emphasis is placed on liberal arts education via the college's general education requirements. Much of TCNJ is built in Georgian colonial revival architecture style on a 289-acre (117 ha) tree-lined campus.

== History ==
The college was established on February 9, 1855, by an act of the New Jersey Legislature mandating the creation of a state normal school, making the New Jersey State Normal School the first teacher training institution in New Jersey and the ninth in the United States. Prior to this, then-Governor Rodman McCamley Price had actively promoted the notion of founding a training institute for New Jersey's teachers and helped to mobilize support among influential state leaders.

For the first 73 years, the school was located in Trenton on Clinton Avenue. Beginning in 1925, the institution offered its first four-year baccalaureate degrees, and engaged in a transitional program of expansion. In 1928, a suburban tract of 210 acres (85 ha) was purchased in nearby Ewing Township and preparations were underway to relocate the college. The first building erected on the new campus was Green Hall, built in traditional Georgian colonial style. The majority of buildings now on campus reflect Green Hall's architecture. In 1996, in a move spearheaded by its president, Harold Eickhoff, The College of New Jersey adopted its current name.

Programs in the graduate study were instituted in 1947, followed by accreditation from various national associations in the 1950s. The enactment of the Higher Education Act of 1966 paved the way for TCNJ to become a comprehensive institution by expanding its degree programs into a variety of fields aside from the education of teachers. By 1972, 70 percent of entering students were selecting non-education majors.

Names

- 1855 – New Jersey State Normal School
- 1908 – New Jersey State Normal School in Trenton
- 1929 – New Jersey State Teachers College and State Normal School at Trenton
- 1937 – New Jersey State Teachers College at Trenton
- 1958 – Trenton State College
- 1996 – The College of New Jersey

== Academic ==
More than 50 liberal arts and professional programs are offered through the college's seven schools: Arts and Communication; Business; Education; Engineering; Humanities and Social Sciences; Nursing, Health and Exercise Science; and Science.

The College of New Jersey offers degrees in over 50 liberal arts and professional programs. TCNJ also offers a 7-year combined B.S./M.D. (Bachelor of Science/Doctor of Medicine) program for graduating high school students in conjunction with New Jersey Medical School. Admission into this program is highly selective.

These programs are organized within seven schools:

- School of the Arts and Communication
- School of Business
- School of Humanities and Social Sciences
- School of Education
- School of Engineering
- School of Nursing, Health and Exercise Science
- School of Science

=== Rankings ===
According to U.S. News & World Report’s 2022 rankings, TCNJ ranked #5 in the Regional Universities North category. U.S. News & World Report also ranked TCNJ #1 in Top Public Schools in the Northeast USA, #2 in Best Colleges for Veterans, #7 in Most Innovative Schools, #6 in Best Undergraduate Teaching, top #100 in the United States in Best Value Schools as well as citations for high ranking engineering and nursing programs. The Princeton Review, in their 2021 ranking, ranked TCNJ #47 for the "Best Value College".

== Campus life ==
Undergraduate demographics as of Fall 2023
Race and ethnicity	Total
White	59%
Hispanic	18%
Asian	10%
Black	6%
Two or more races	3%
Unknown	3%
International student	1%
Economic diversity
Low-income (Note: The percentage of students who received an income-based federal Pell grant intended for low-income students.)	20%
Affluent (Note: The percentage of students who are a part of the American middle class at the bare minimum.)	80%

=== Residence halls ===
First-year students at TCNJ choose a room assignment in Travers Tower, Wolfe Tower, Centennial Hall, Cromwell Hall, Norsworthy Hall or any room in the Allen/Brewster/Ely Complex. 83 percent of TCNJ first-year students live on campus. As of Fall 2026, rising students (second-year students and above) can all choose from any of the other campus buildings. Prior to Fall 2026, sophomore residents were limited to New Residence, Eickhoff Hall, Townhouses East, and Decker Hall, while upperclassmen were limited to Townhouses South, Townhouses West, Phelps Hall and Hausdoerffer Hall. All TCNJ students also have the option to live in Campus Town, a privately managed apartment complex that counts as on-campus housing as pertains to TCNJ's on-campus housing requirement for new students. Upperclassmen may also live in one of the various College Houses that surround the campus.

=== Campus Town ===
In 2013, groundbreaking began for The Campus Town complex. Consisting of seven buildings — Campus Town Clock Tower, apartments and recreation space — Campus Town was built by PRC Campus Centers LLC on 12 acres of property located on campus and it has 80,000 square feet of commercial space.

The Campus Town complex has space to house 446 juniors and seniors in one-, two- and four-bedroom apartments. Each apartment has a living room/dining area, separate bedrooms, one or two bathrooms depending upon the unit, a full kitchen with a dishwasher and a full-sized washer and dryer.

The Campus Town complex houses an 11,500-square-foot fitness center that replaced the college's 4,000-square-foot gym. The apartments and the fitness center are only open to the students, but the complex's retail stores are open to the public. Barnes & Noble was an anchor tenant, but its 14,000-square-foot store has since been closed and the on-campus bookstore moved to the campus library. Other facilities include Panera, Jersey Mike's, a frozen yogurt shop, a sushi restaurant, and various other restaurants and stores.

=== Entrepreneurship ===
In the mid-2000s, TCNJ began to put a more concentrated effort on student entrepreneurship. Administrative resources were put toward counselling and workshops for students. The Mayo Business Plan Competition in April 2012 saw numerous student groups competing for $12,000 to launch their start-up businesses. The school has also held entrepreneurship events for local high school students.

=== Student life ===
There are over 230 recognized student organizations at TCNJ. Greek life at TCNJ is governed by the Inter-Greek Council. The Inter-Greek Council recognizes 30 organizations; 16 sororities, 12 fraternities, and 3 coed organizations.

=== Brower Student Center ===
The Brower Student Center (BSC) is the student center on campus; it was named after former president Clayton R. Brower. The BSC was built in 1976. The building is home to all of the student organizations on campus, as well as some dining facilities.

=== Museums and exhibits ===
The College of New Jersey is home to the David Sarnoff Museum, formerly located at Princeton Junction. The collection detailing the life of NBC founder David Sarnoff is now located in Roscoe L. West Hall. Various art exhibits can be found in galleries at the Art and IMM building. The exhibits feature the work of student artists, professional artists and local artists. The exhibits are updated regularly.

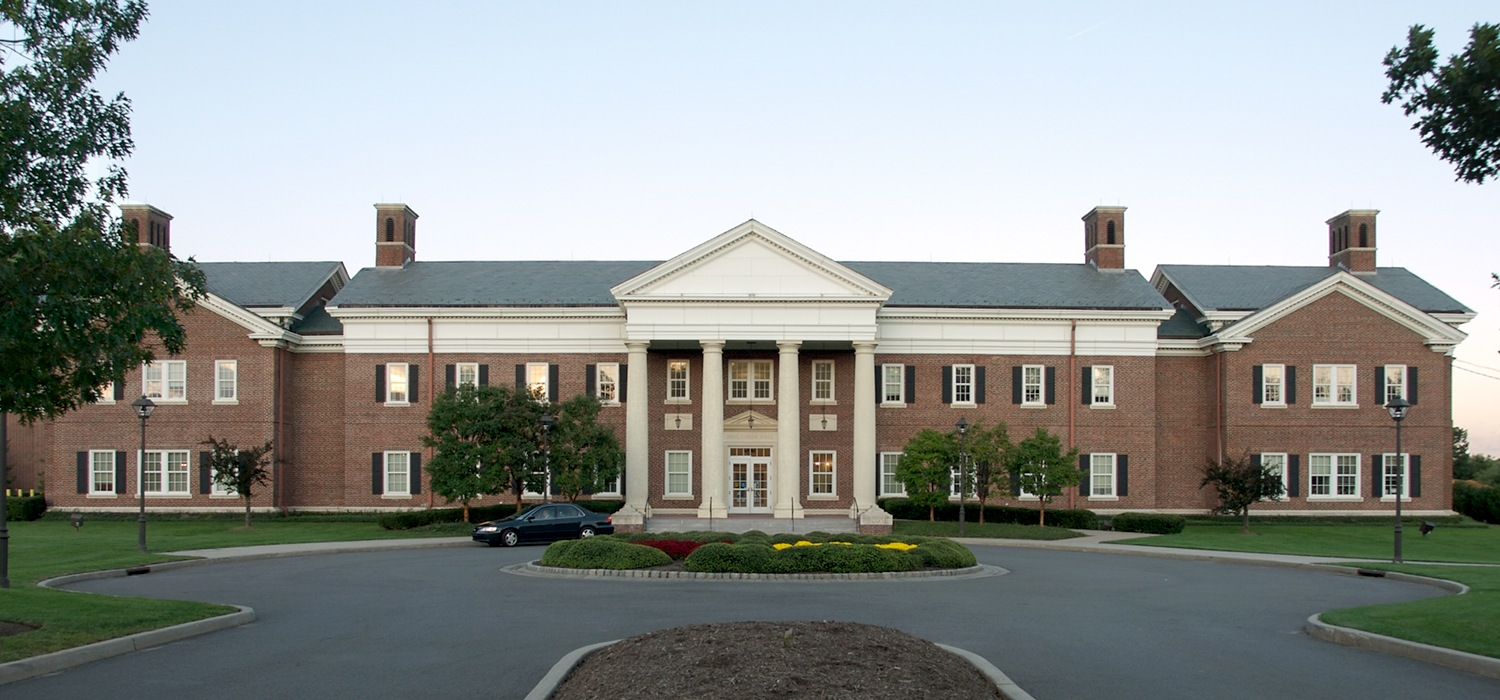
Trenton Hall

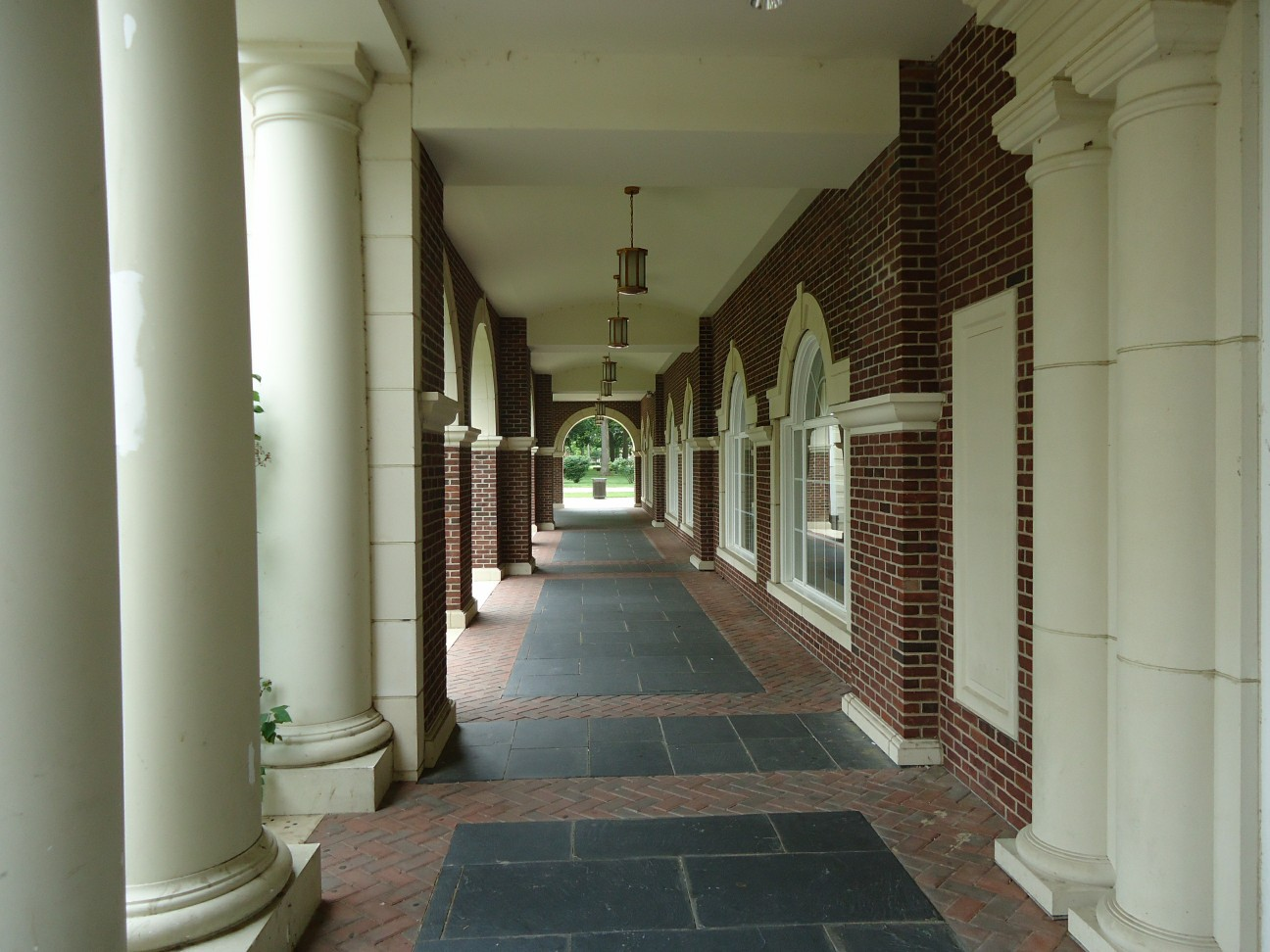
Front corridor to the Gitenstein Library

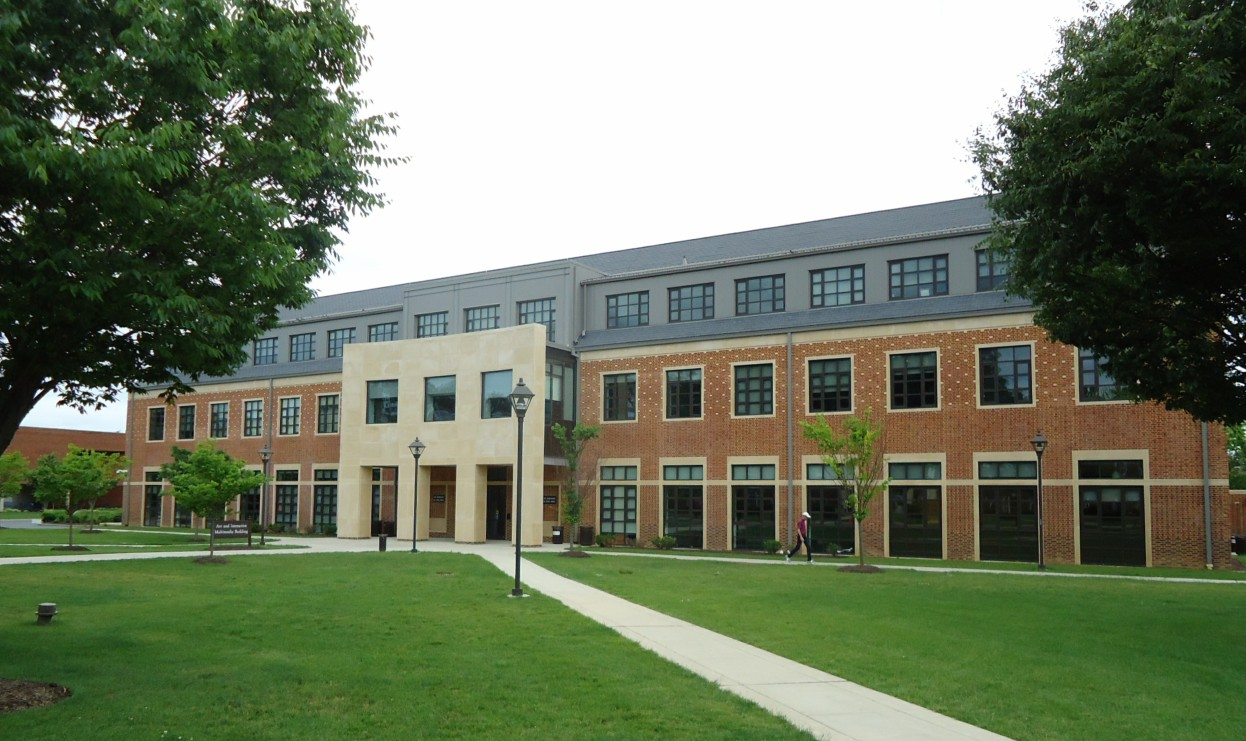
Art and Interactive Multimedia Building

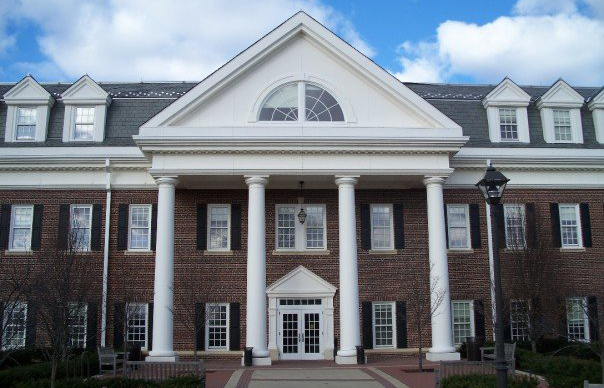
Social Sciences Building

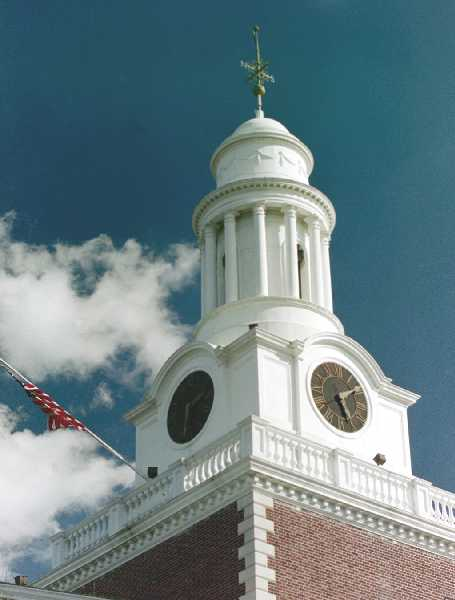
Green Hall Clock Tower

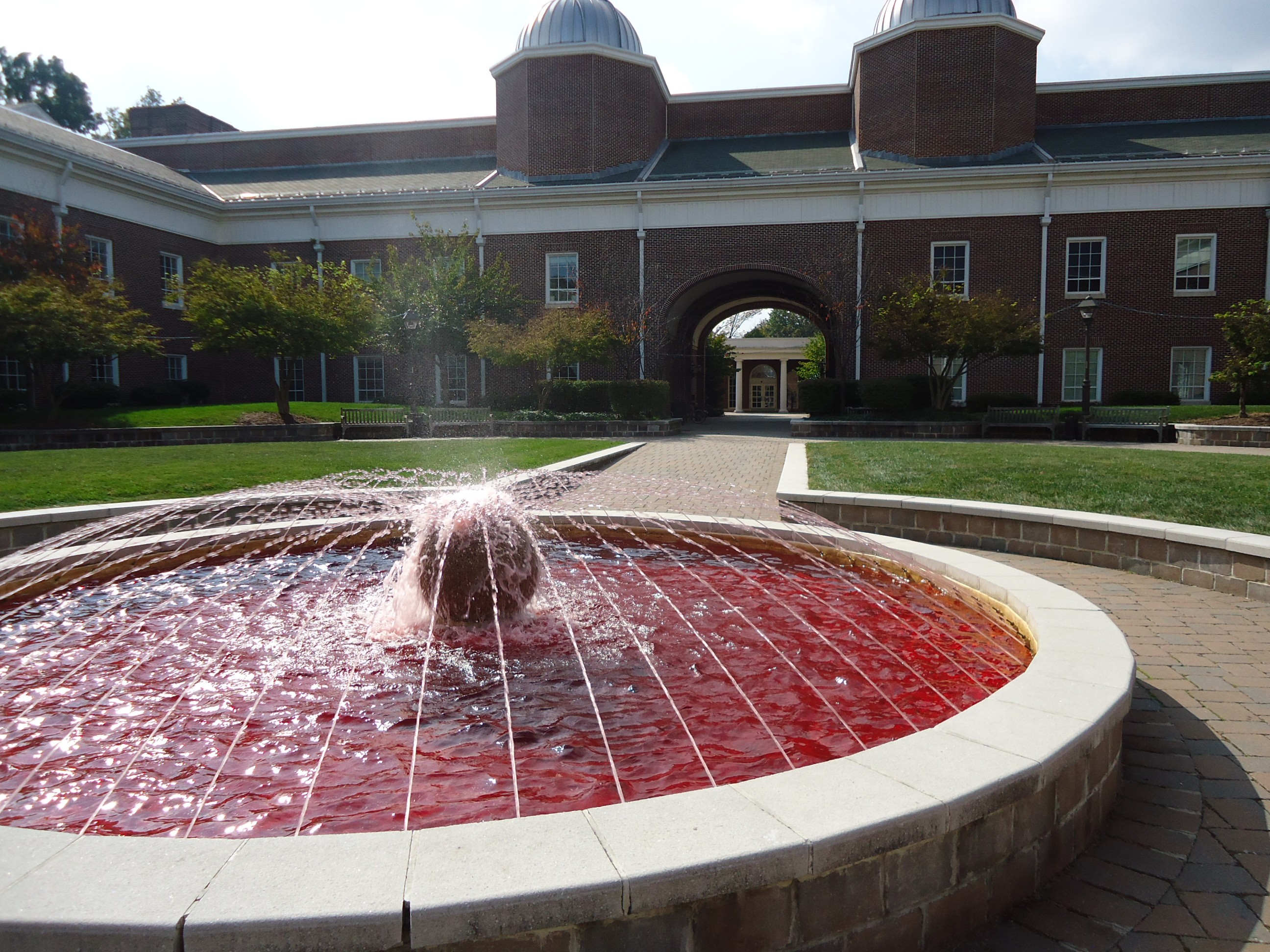
The fountain at the Science Complex

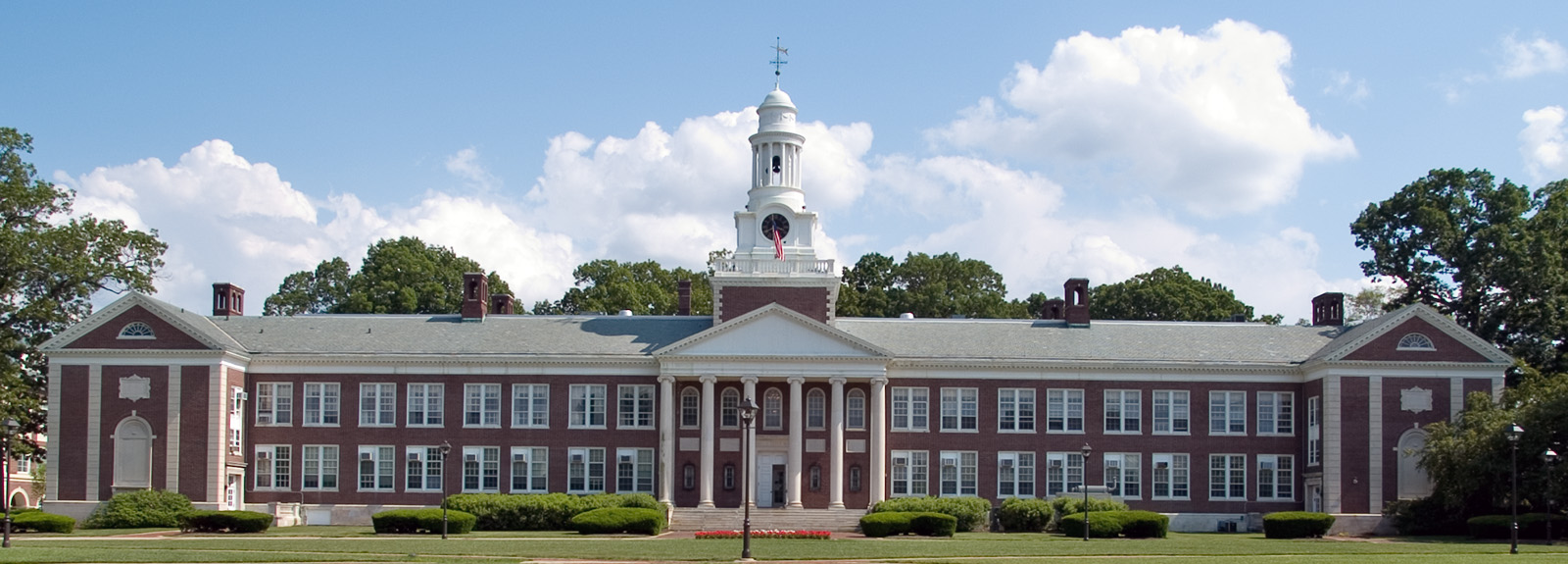
Green Hall

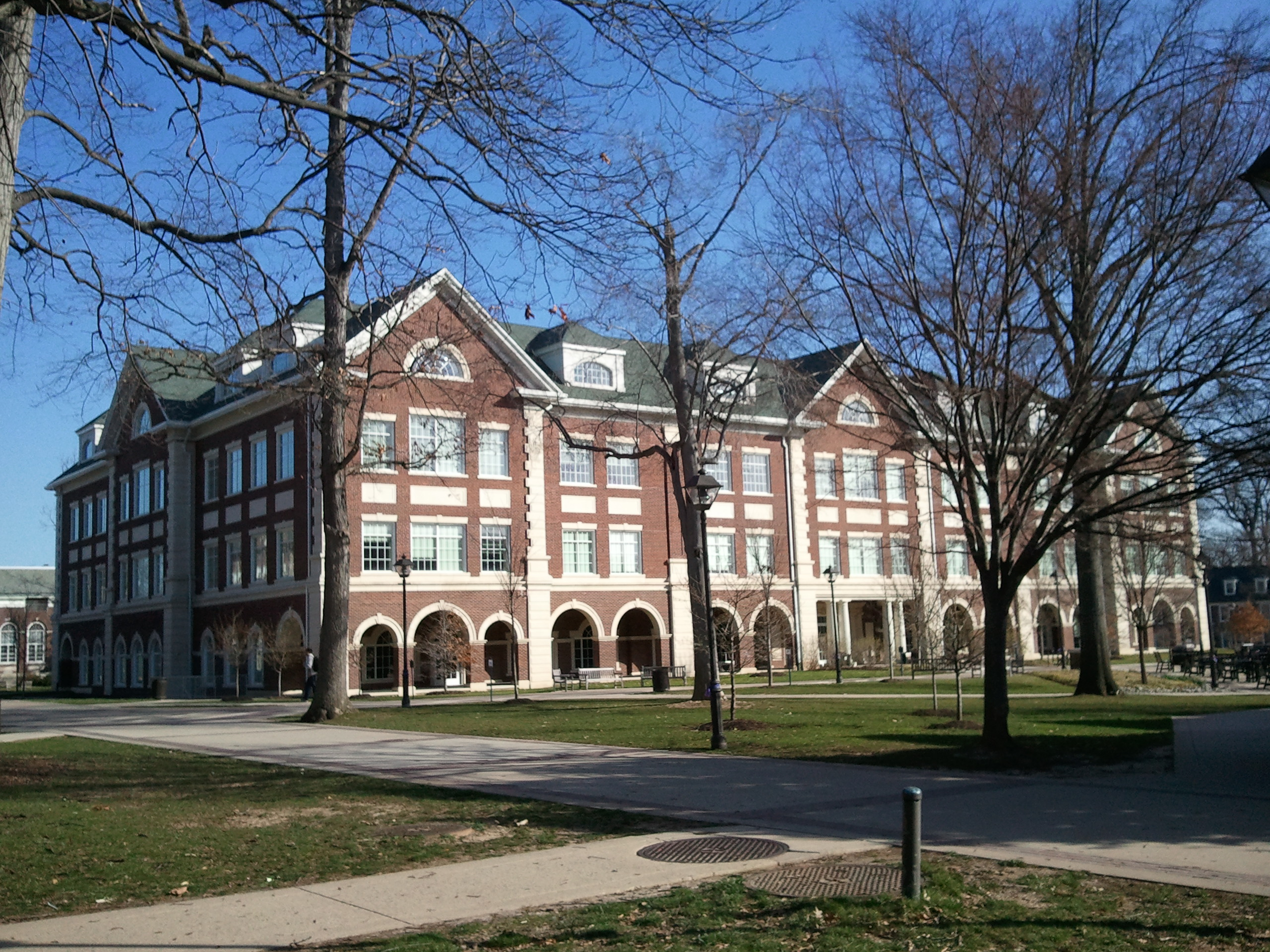
Library

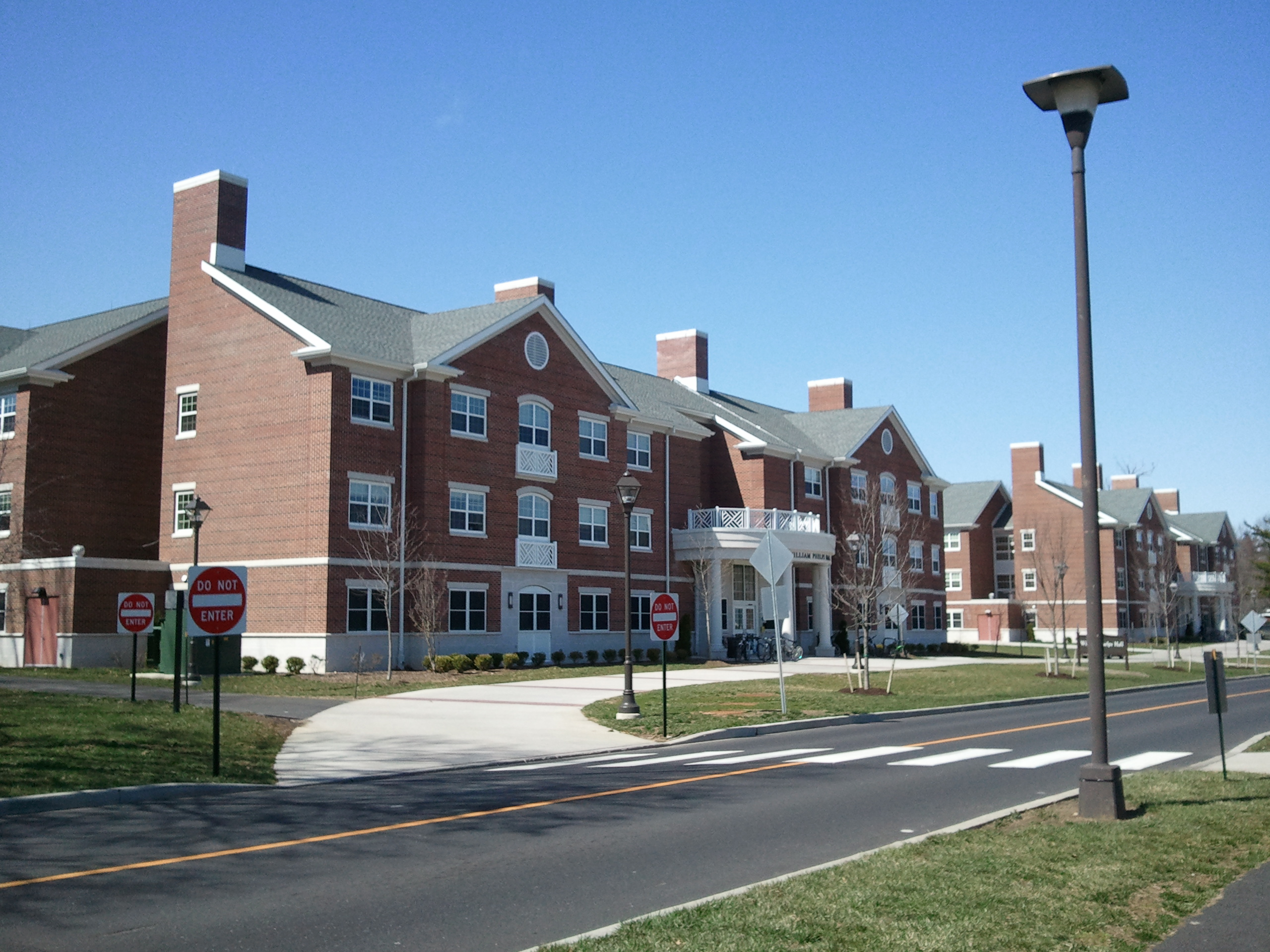
Phelps and Hausdoerffer

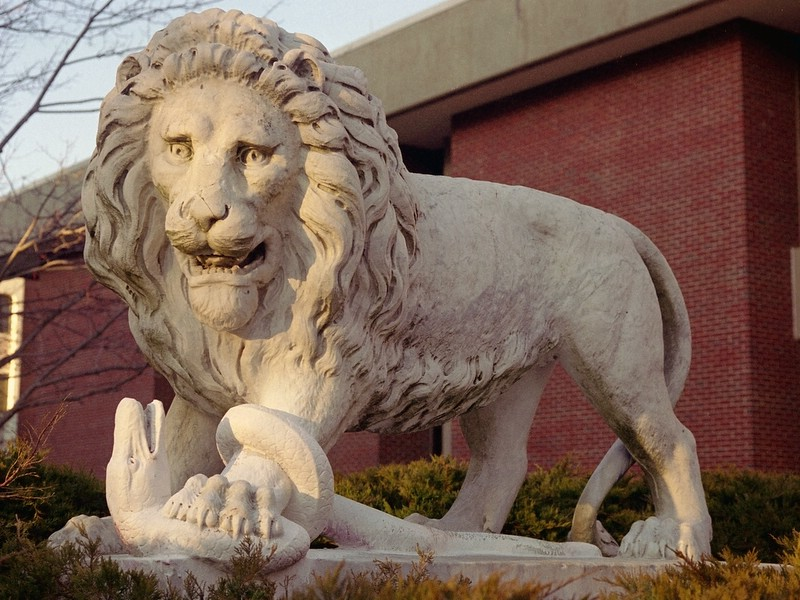
TCNJ's mascot, "Roscoe"

=== Campus media ===
==== Publications ====
The Signal has been The College of New Jersey's student-run newspaper since 1855. It has won numerous awards, and has placed first many times in the General Excellence category (the highest category) for collegiate news publications at the New Jersey Press Association awards. The Signal is run almost entirely out of their office located on AIMM's second floor.

TCNJ Magazine is another publication, covering both current campus life and alumni affairs. The Perspective, an openly left-leaning student news booklet, is the school's newest publication having been first published in 2009. The Perspective received funding from the Student Finance Board, but so far has no established publishing schedule (as opposed to other campus publications). On the literary side, The Lion's Eye and The Siren are both student-made magazines filled with poetry, prose and artwork by students. The Seal was TCNJ's yearbook since its first publication in 1911. However, following the 2017 edition, the publication and student organization were discontinued due to low demand and incumbent debt.

==== Radio ====
WTSR (91.3 FM) is the college's non-commercial radio station which services Mercer County and Bucks County, Pennsylvania while also broadcasting over the internet. The station began in 1958 as WTSC, but was approved for an FM license in the fall of 1965. The station is fully student run and enlists the help of both students and community volunteers. The station offers traditional dayside programming while also offering a variety of specialty programming that consists of shows featuring folk/world, synth-pop, modern rock, metal, reggae, oldies, gospel, and more.

==== Television ====
Lions Television (abbreviated 'LTV') has been the student run television station on campus since 2008. Its studio and office are located in Kendall Hall and its content can be viewed online or on campus televisions on channel 2-2. The station board includes six producers (sports, news, music, comedy, pop culture and game show) who film, direct and edit content both in studio and around the school's campus.

== Athletics ==
The College of New Jersey has 22 varsity teams and 18 club teams, including multiple programs that have achieved national recognition and success. Its varsity teams are members of the New Jersey Athletic Conference (NJAC) and compete in Division III of the National Collegiate Athletic Association (NCAA). The college's mascot is "Roscoe the Lion."

TCNJ's varsity teams are the top combined first- and second-place finishers of all 424 Division III schools in the nation over more than 25 years.

== Notable alumni ==
The College of New Jersey Alumni

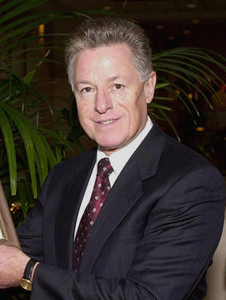
James Florio, the 49th Governor of New Jersey, graduated from TCNJ in 1962.

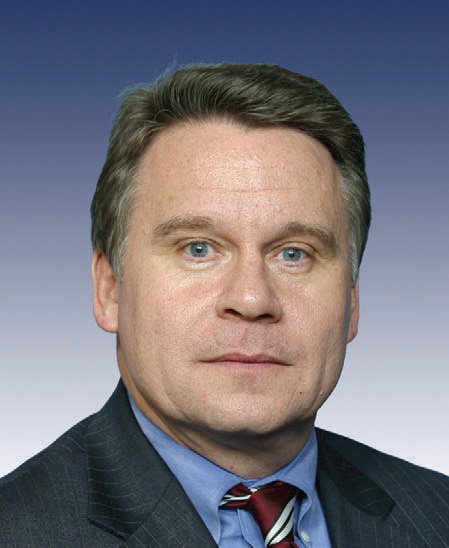
Chris Smith, U.S. Representative for New Jersey's 4th congressional district.

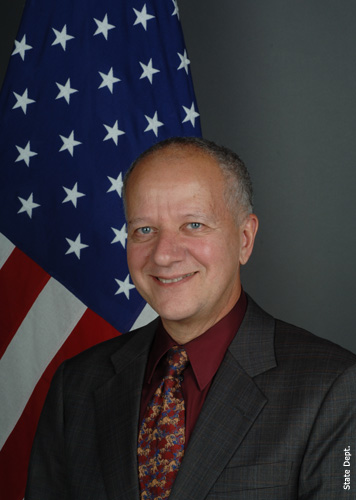
Joseph A. Mussomeli, the U.S. Ambassador to the Republic of Slovenia.

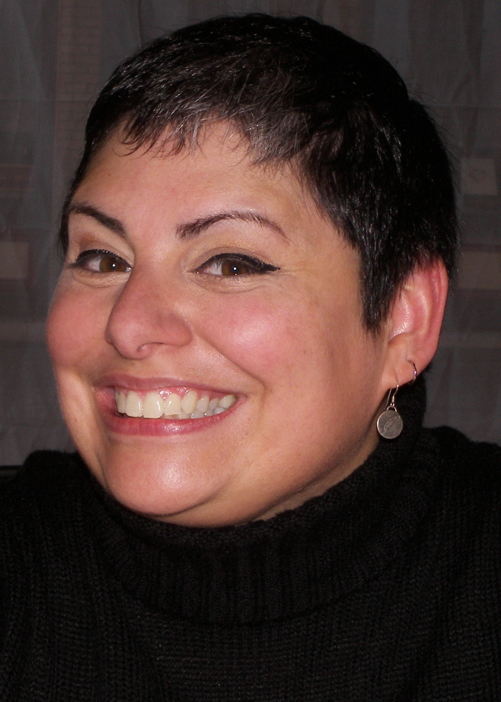
Holly Black, author of The Spiderwick Chronicles, a series of children's fantasy books.

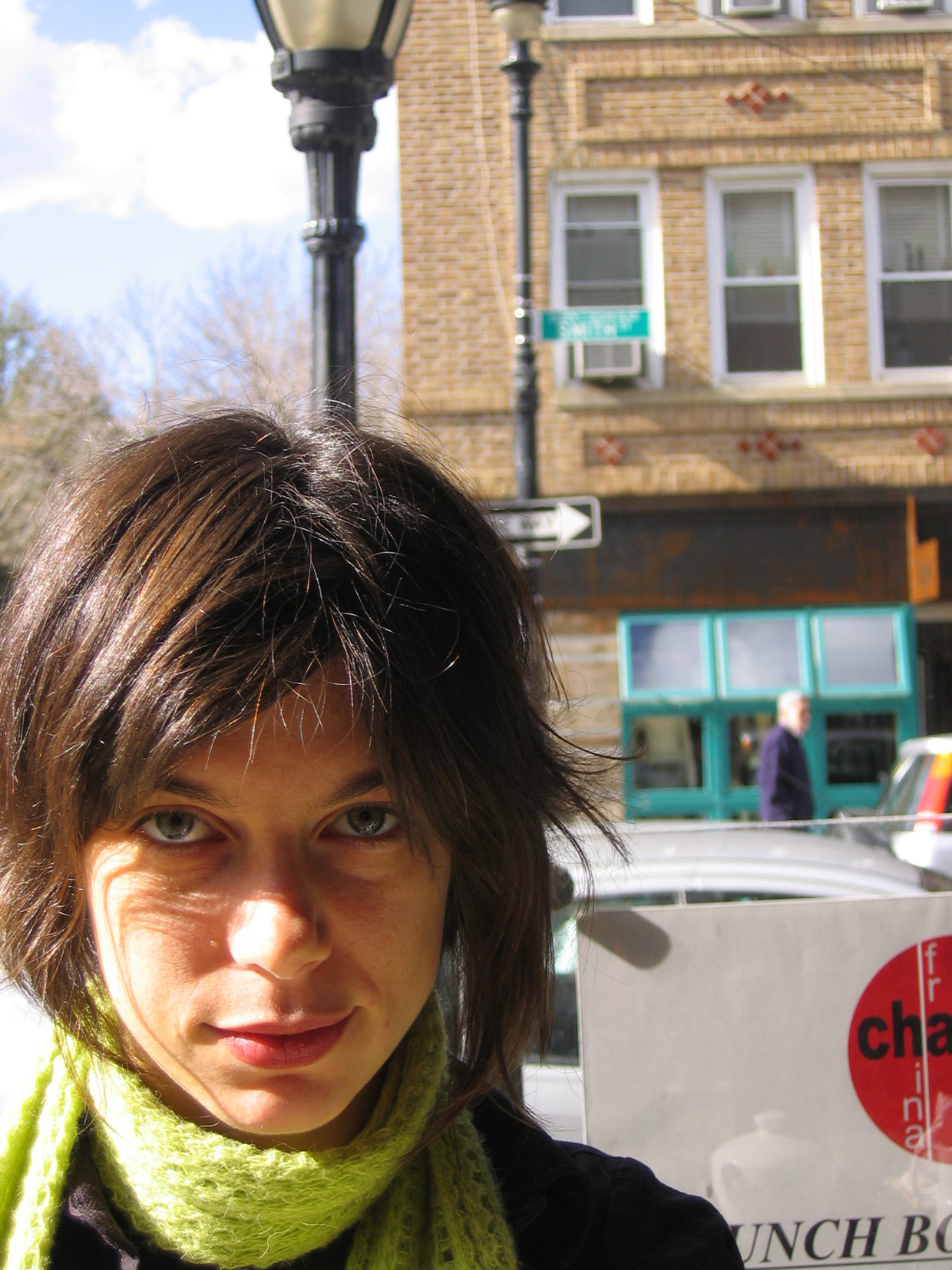
Sheila Callaghan, playwright and screenwriter.

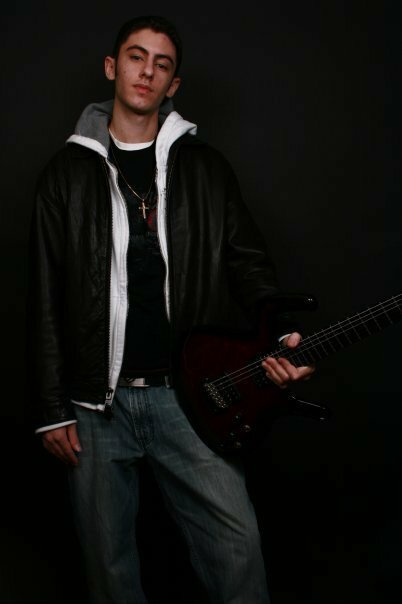
Stephen Dadaian, is an electric and classical guitarist.

== Notable faculty ==
- Juda Bennett – English
- Celia Chazelle – History
- Roy A. Clouser – Philosophy
- Allan Gotthelf - Philosophy (student of Ayn Rand)
- Ellen G. Friedman – English and Women's & Gender Studies
- James A. Graham – Psychology
- Jean Graham – English
- Nancy Hingston – Mathematics
- Matthew John Lawrence - Communication Studies
- Xinru Liu – History
- Catie Rosemurgy – Creative Writing
- Jess Row – English
- Donna Shaw – Journalism
- Gary C. Woodward – Communications
- Daniel W. Crofts - History

== Demographics ==
The College of New Jersey CDP
- Census-designated place
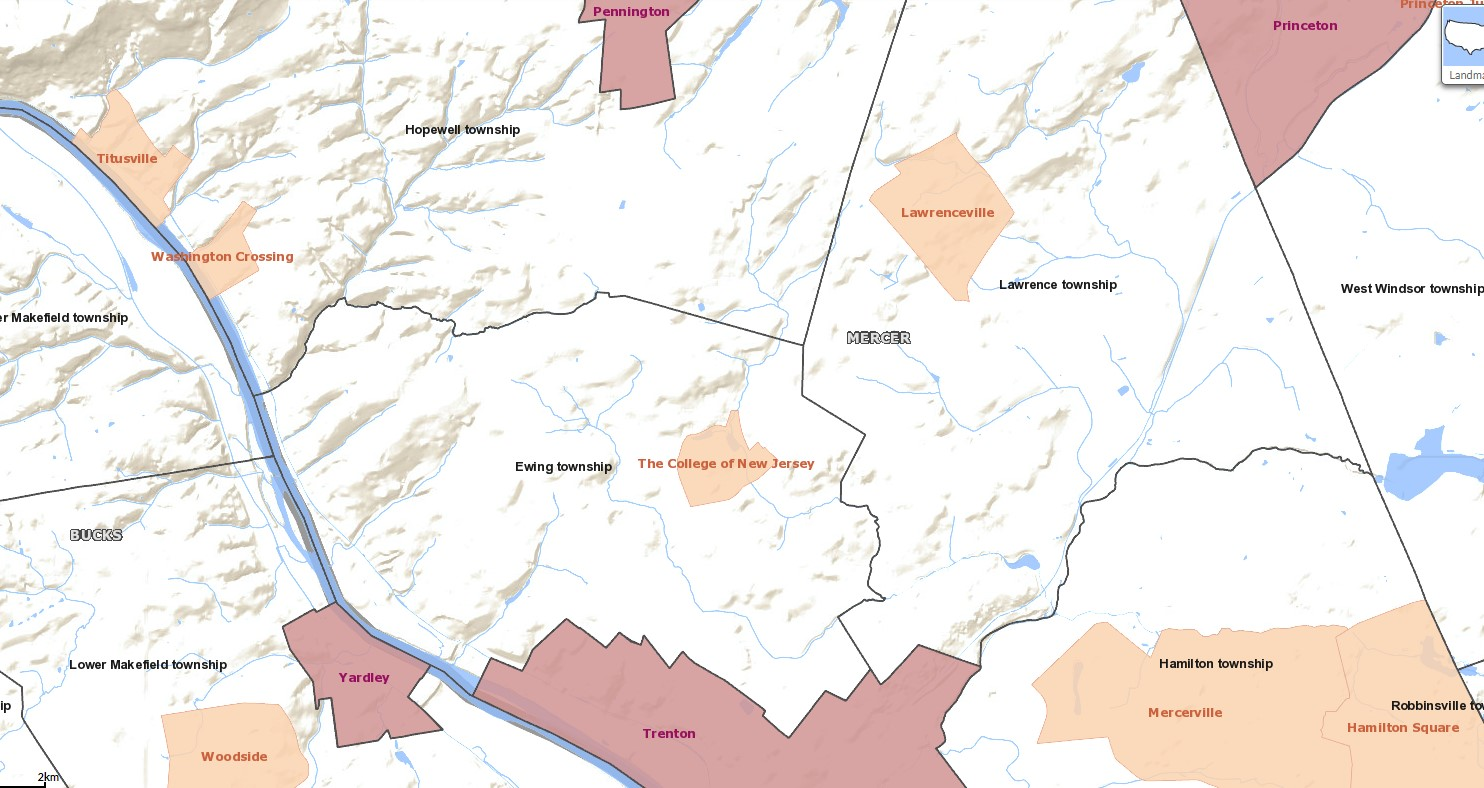
- Interactive map of The College of New Jersey CDP
- Country: United States
- State: New Jersey
- County: Mercer

Area
  - Total: 0.45 sq mi (1.17 km^{2})
  - Land: 0.43 sq mi (1.11 km^{2})
  - Water: 0.027 sq mi (0.07 km^{2})
- Elevation: 121 ft (37 m)

Population (2020)
  - Total: 3,701
  - Density: 8,652.2/sq mi (3,340.63/km^{2})
- Time zone: UTC−05:00 (Eastern (EST))
  - Summer (DST): UTC−04:00 (Eastern (EDT))
- FIPS code: 34-72580
- GNIS feature ID: 2806196
- Website: www.tcnj.edu

The College of New Jersey is a census-designated place (CDP) covering the TCNJ campus.

It first appeared as a CDP in the 2020 Census with a population of 3,701.

Historical population
Census	Pop.	Note	%±
2020	3,701		—
U.S. Decennial Census; 2020

The school district covering the CDP is Ewing Township School District.

=== 2020 census ===
The College of New Jersey CDP, New Jersey – Racial and ethnic composition Note: the US Census treats Hispanic/Latino as an ethnic category. This table excludes Latinos from the racial categories and assigns them to a separate category. Hispanics/Latinos may be of any race.
Race / Ethnicity (NH = Non-Hispanic)	Pop 2020	% 2020
White alone (NH)	1,872	50.58%
Black or African American alone (NH)	937	25.32%
Native American or Alaska Native alone (NH)	14	0.38%
Asian alone (NH)	252	6.81%
Native Hawaiian or Pacific Islander alone (NH)	1	0.03%
Other race alone (NH)	0	0.00%
Mixed race Multiracial (NH)	13	0.35%
Hispanic or Latino (any race)	612	16.54%
Total	3,701	100.00%

== See also ==
- List of American state universities
- Trenton Computer Festival

== Notes ==
- Jarrold, Rachel M.; Fromm, Glenn (1955). Time the Great Teacher. Princeton, NJ: Princeton University Press.
