= John Authers =

British finance journalist and author

- Born: 1966; Amersham
- Education: University College, Oxford; Columbia Journalism School; Columbia Business School
- Occupations: Financial journalist; Finance author
- Known for: Lex Column
- Spouse: Sara Silver
- Children: 3

John Authers (born 1966), is a British financial journalist and finance author, who spent almost three decades reporting at the Financial Times (including becoming Chief Markets Commentator and global head of the Lex Column), before moving to Bloomberg in 2018.

== Early life and education ==
Authers grew up in Lewes in East Sussex in England, attended Priory School, and spent a year in 1985 at the Belmont Hill School in Massachusetts on an exchange scholarship. From 1985 to 1989, he completed a philosophy, politics and economics degree at the University College, Oxford. While at Oxford, Authers was captain of his college 1987 University Challenge team that earned the record for the highest score in any round of the competition (520), although they lost the season final.

In 2000, Authers earned a fellowship from the Knight-Bagehot Fellowship Program, and completed his MS in Journalism at the Columbia Journalism School (2000), and his MBA at Columbia Business School (2001); he is on the Alumni Board of Advisors for the program.

== Journalist ==
Authers joined the Financial Times in 1990, where he would stay for over twenty-nine years, holding various positions such as US markets editor, Mexico City bureau chief, US banking correspondent, personal finance correspondent, education and local government correspondent, and ‘On Wall Street’ columnist. In 2010, he was made global head of the Lex Column in the FT, and by 2018, he was Chief Markets Commentator. In 2018, Authers left the FT and joined Bloomberg News as Senior Markets Editor.

Authers has been interviewed on financial events by other national media outlets including NPR, BBC News, and the New York Times.

== Author ==
In 2003, he co-authored with Richard Wolffe The Victim's Fortune: Inside the Epic Battle Over the Debts of the Holocaust, which American diplomat Philip H. Gordon writing in Foreign Affairs described as a book that "... turned an important, depressing, and intensely technical subject – the negotiations over how to repay Holocaust-era debts – into a gripping tale replete with deserving victims, grandstanding politicians, greedy class-action lawyers, and tightfisted European bankers". The book won the Knight-Bagehot award from the Columbia University Graduate School of Journalism.

In 2010, Authers published The Fearful Rise of Markets: A Short View of Global Bubbles and Synchronised Meltdowns, which explained why increasing central bank control over financial markets – to generate economic growth via asset price inflation, and protect asset via the Greenspan put – had led to artificially high levels of price correlation. It made the FT's list of business books of the year for 2010.

== Awards ==
- Society of American Business Editors and Writers "Best in Business" award (2008, and 2010).
- State Street Institutional Press Awards (2008) "UK investment journalist of the year".
- Wincott Foundation Awards (2009) "Senior Journalist of the Year".

== Published works ==
- Authers, John (November 2012). Europe's Financial Crisis. FT Press. ISBN 978-0133133714.
- Authers, John (April 2010). The Fearful Rise of Markets. FT Press. ISBN 978-0137072996.
- Authers, John; Wolffe, Richard (July 2003). The Victim's Fortune: Inside the Epic Battle Over the Debts of the Holocaust. Harper Perennial. ISBN 978-0137072996.

== Personal ==
Authers is married to financial journalist, Sara Silver, with whom he has three children; they live in New York. Authers and Silver have collaborated on pieces together.

Authers is also a classical singer and has performed in Carnegie Hall, and in choirs for singers such as Cecilia Bartoli and Luciano Pavarotti.

== See also ==
- Gillian Tett
- Everything bubble
