= Jean Graham =

American academic

- Education: The University of Akron (B.A., M.A.); Case Western Reserve University (Ph.D.)
- Occupation: Professor of English at The College of New Jersey

Jean E. Graham is an American scholar, translator, and professor of English at The College of New Jersey, where she has taught since 1994. She teaches courses in British literature, the Bible as literature, and science fiction. Her research interests include science fiction and British literature.

== Education ==
Graham earned her Ph.D. in English Language and Literature from Case Western Reserve University in Cleveland, Ohio. Prior to her doctoral studies, Graham received her B.A. and M.A. in English from The University of Akron.

== Publications ==
- "Austen and 'The Advantage of Height'". Persuasions 20 (Summer 1999). http://www.jasna.org/persuasions/on-line/vol20no1/.
- "'Ay me': Selfishness and Empathy in 'Lycidas'". Early Modern Literary Studies 2 (December 1996). http://extra.shu.ac.uk/emls/02-3/02-3toc.html.
- "'High Delights that satisfy all Appetites': The Devotional Poetry of Thomas Traherne". Early Modern Literary Studies 20 (2018). https://extra.shu.ac.uk/emls/journal/index.php/emls/article/view/314
- "Holodeck Masquing: Early Modern Genre Meets Star Trek". Journal of Popular Culture 34 (Fall 2000): 21–27.
- "Katherine Philips and 'Churching'". The Explicator 70 (August 2012): 161–63.
- "Milton's Comus in Ann Radcliffe's The Mysteries of Udolpho'". The Explicator 72 (May 2014): 97–100.
- "The Performing Heir in Jonson's Jacobean Masques". SEL: Studies in English Literature, 1500–1900 41 (Spring 2001): 381–98.
- "'Seventy Seven' in Ben Jonson's The Alchemist". The Explicator 70 (December 2012): 256–59.
- "The Talking Beasts as Adam and Eve: Lewis and the Complexity of 'Dominion'". Mythlore 38 (Fall/Winter 2019): 115–29. https://dc.swosu.edu/mythlore/
- "'Tell All Men’: Bunyan and the Gendering of Discourse". Bunyan Studies 11 (2003/2004): 8-22.
- "'Trying to Give the Girl a Chance': Gaps and Silences in the Novels of Jean Rhys". Jean Rhys Review 10 (1999): 1–12. Republished online at http://jeanrhysreview.org/
- "Virgin Ears: Silence, Deafness, and Chastity in Milton's Maske". Milton Studies 36 (1998): 1–17.
- "Vocal Women, Silent Woman: Gender in the Noble Numbers". ANQ: A Quarterly Journal of Short Articles, Notes, and Reviews 20 (August 2012): 154–60.
- “Who 'laid him in a manger'? Biblical Women in Herbert, Vaughan, and Traherne". Explorations in Renaissance Culture 41 (2015): 56-74.
- "'Wo'is me' and 'Ah my deare': Parenthetical Metacommentary in Donne and Herbert". The John Donne Journal 33 (2016): 165–201.
- "Women, Sex, and Power: Circe and Lilith in Narnia". Children's Literature Quarterly 29 (Spring/Summer 2004): 32–44. Republished in Children’s Literature Review, Vol. 173.
