= Mary Williams Walsh =

- Born: December 5, 1955 (age 70); Wausau, Wisconsin
- Occupations: business journalist, investigative journalist

Mary Williams Walsh (born December 1, 1955) is an American investigative journalist.

== Background and education ==
Mary Williams Walsh was born in Wausau, Wisconsin, in 1955. She graduated from the University of Wisconsin in 1979 with degrees in French and English. Walsh was a Walter Bagehot Fellow in economics and business journalism at Columbia University's Graduate School of Business during the 1982–83 academic year and a Nieman Fellow at Harvard University during the 1998–99 academic year.

She is married with two children and lives in Philadelphia.

== Career ==
Walsh began working as a general assignment reporter at The Wall Street Journal in 1983 and was a foreign correspondent for the Journal from 1985 to 1989, reporting from Latin America and South and Southeast Asia. From 1989 to 1998 Walsh was a foreign correspondent for the Los Angeles Times, reporting from various locations in Europe, Africa and North America. Her reports from Europe for the Los Angeles Times received the Overseas Press Club of America citation for excellence in 1995.

In 2000, Walsh became a reporter for the business/financial desk of The New York Times. Her 2002 reports with Walt Bogdanich and Barry Meier won the George Polk Award for Health Care. The same series of reports was also a finalist for the 2003 Gerald Loeb Award for distinguished business and financial journalism. Her Times reporting on public pensions, with Michael Cooper, won a Society of American Business Editors and Writers award for explanatory journalism in 2011.
