= Purchasing (magazine) =

- Type: business magazine
- Format: Paper and online magazine
- Owner: Reed Business Information
- Editor: Paul Teague
- Founded: 1915
- Ceased publication: 2010
- Language: English
- Headquarters: Waltham, Massachusetts, USA
- Circulation: 92,724
- ISSN: 0033-4448
- Website: Purchasing

Purchasing magazine (ISSN 0033-4448) was a trade publication serving the information needs of purchasing professionals. A companion web site included most of the editorial content of issues from January 1998 through the current issue, plus current information not found in the magazine. Both were owned by Reed Business Information.

The last editor-in-chief was Paul Teague, with the editorial offices located in Waltham, Massachusetts, USA.

Established in 1915, Purchasing magazine was published 12 times per year.

Common articles discussed procurement, strategic sourcing, manufacturing, logistics, and other supply chain related topics.

As of December 2006, total BPA audited circulation was 92,724 subscribers.

Effective April 2010, Purchasing Magazine stopped publication.
