= TCNJ School of Business =

College of Business in New Jersey

Coordinates: 40.26959°N 74.78174°W

The College of New Jersey School of Business
- Type: Public College
- Established: 1981
- Dean: Tammy Lynn Dieterich (Interim)
- Location: Ewing, New Jersey, USA
- Campus: Suburban
- Website: business.tcnj.edu

TCNJ School of Business is one of seven schools at The College of New Jersey. The school is an accredited member of AACSB.

== History ==
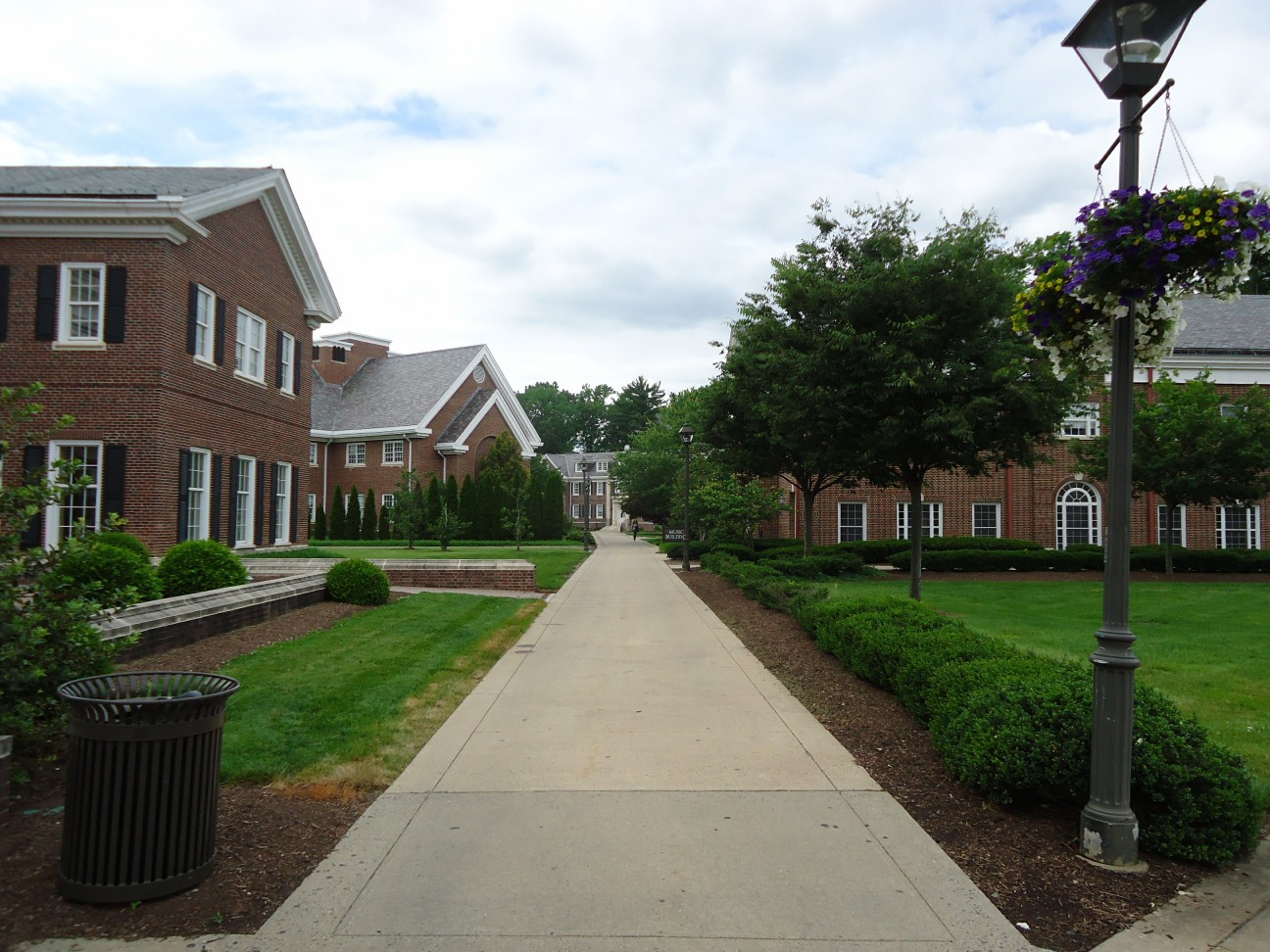
Walkway to the TCNJ School of Business.

Initially known as the Division of Business and Economics, the school was renamed the School of Business on July 1, 1981.

=== Campus ===
During the 1980s and 1990s, business classes were held in different buildings across campus while a new building was under construction. The latest building for the School of Business was completed in 2000, and features Georgian colonial architecture similar to the rest of the TCNJ campus.

=== Computer Lab ===
The school's computer lab is noted for being the first microcomputer lab in the country.

== Degree programs ==
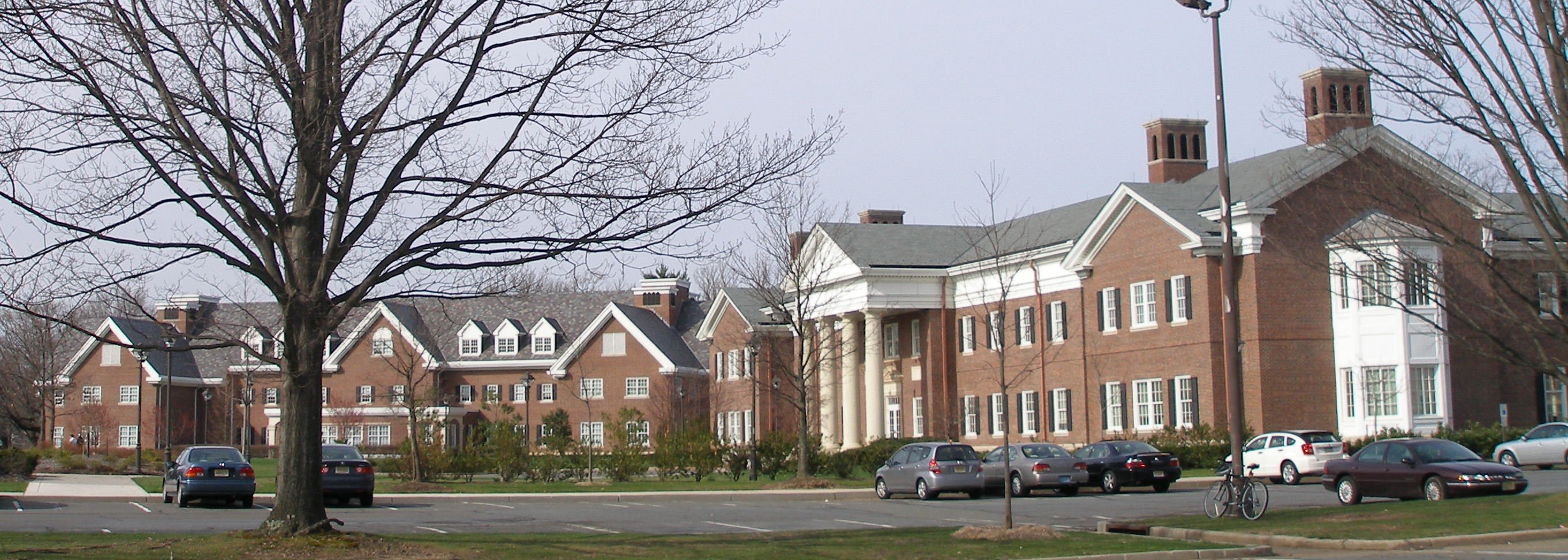
TCNJ School of Business

The School of Business at TCNJ primarily focuses on undergraduate education, offering Bachelor of Science degrees in:

- Accounting and information systems
- Economics
- Finance
- International business
- Marketing
- Management
- Management information systems
- Interdisciplinary Business

=== Accounting ===
According to a survey of 2021 graduates, the majority of respondents (18.8%) reported securing full-time employments within the financial services industry following graduation.

=== Economics ===
Obtaining the Bachelor of Science degree in economics at TCNJ indicates completion of the core business curriculum in addition to its economics requirements. The economics program provides extensive instruction in other business disciplines (e.g., finance, management), and its goal is to prepare students for MBA degree.

=== Finance ===
The finance program at TCNJ has the largest number of business students. The mission of the program is for students to have the ability to analyze the allocation of financial resources within a corporation or government setting; to analyze sources of funding and ramifications of financial decisions. Students graduating from TCNJ finance programs are employed by banks, financial institutions, brokerage houses, major corporations and the government. Many graduates of the program continue toward graduate education in top business schools.

=== International business ===
The international business program offers courses emphasizing international trade and investments. To fulfill a graduation requirement, students must complete a one-semester study abroad.

=== Marketing, management, MIS and interdisciplinary business ===
TCNJ students in marketing, management, management information systems, and interdisciplinary business are offered Bachelor of Science upon completion of required courses. A great deal of emphasis is placed on liberal arts education along with the core business requirements.

== Accreditation ==
The school received its initial accreditation from AACSB International in 1997 and was fully reaccredited in December 2008. It is now one of 50 accredited institutions worldwide that focuses exclusively on undergraduate business education.

== Notable alumni ==
- Bryan M. Kuderna is a CFP, Life Underwriter Training Council Fellow and investment adviser representative with Kuderna Financial Team, a New Jersey–based financial services firm. He is also the author of the best-selling book Millennial Millionaire: A Guide to Become a Millionaire by 30.
