= Chris Welles =

American business journalist

- Born: Christopher Jewett Welles; December 11, 1937; Boston, United States
- Died: June 19, 2010 (aged 72); Salisbury, Connecticut
- Occupation: Business journalist
- Known for: Writing for Life (magazine) and editor of BusinessWeek
- Spouse: Nancy Leiserson
- Children: 3

Christopher Jewett Welles (December 11, 1937 – June 19, 2010) was an American business journalist who wrote for Life, BusinessWeek, The Saturday Evening Post and the Los Angeles Times, in addition to a number of books on business topics. Welles headed the Walter Bagehot Fellowship Program in Business and Economics Journalism at the Columbia University Graduate School of Journalism.

== Early life and education ==
Welles was born on December 11, 1937, in Boston and adopted by textile salesman Clement Welles and his wife Grace Blauvelt Welles, a pediatrician. He graduated with an A.B. in politics from Princeton University in 1959 after completing a senior thesis titled "The Navy and Public Relations." After graduating from Princeton, Welles was commissioned as an ensign in the United States Navy and assigned to the USS Midway (CV-41). He served until 1962 and became a lieutenant (junior grade).

== Career ==
After completing his military service, he was hired as a researcher by Life magazine. An article he had written about the neglect of American oil shale reserves by the petroleum industry that Life turned down was expanded into book form and published in 1970 as The Elusive Bonanza: The Story of Oil Shale, America's Richest and Most Neglected Natural Resource. Life fired him after he sold the piece to Harper's Magazine. His 1975 book The Last Days of the Club documented the decline and fall of old Wall Street institutions and the ascendancy of new companies that would come to replace them.

Welles joined the faculty of the Columbia University Graduate School of Journalism in 1977, where he headed the Walter Bagehot Fellowship Program in Business and Economics Journalism at Columbia, which would later be renamed the Knight-Bagehot Fellowship Program. The fellowship program was established to provide business journalists with the opportunity to hone their craft. Mobil Corporation, a longtime sponsor of the fellowship, backed out of its financial support in retaliation for Welles' earlier writings about the oil industry, stating that the company "didn't have confidence in the leadership" of the program. Welles remained as head of the fellowship until 1985.

Stephen B. Shepard, a former editor of BusinessWeek and later dean of the CUNY Graduate School of Journalism called Welles "probably the premier business writer" of his generation, citing his ability to identify the "shenanigans, abuses and downfalls" in the business world.

In a 1987 article, Barron's financial weekly asserted that Welles "failed to follow one of the basic principles of journalism" by not properly verifying facts in a Business Week article on a meeting of small companies concerned with short seller abuses. Barron's contended that Welles incorrectly reported that two dozen companies appeared at the meeting when the actual number was two, and that he made no mention of the shaky financial condition of the companies claiming short-seller abuses.

== Recognition ==
He received the Gerald Loeb Award for Magazines for the story "Is More Less? Is Faster Slower? Is Bigger Smaller?". He was also recognized at the National Magazine Awards.

== Death ==
A resident of Brooklyn, Welles died at age 72 on June 19, 2010, due to complications of Alzheimer's disease, while at a nursing home in Salisbury, Connecticut. He was survived by his second wife, the former Nancy Leiserson, as well as by three children from his first marriage and seven grandchildren.
