= Knight Center for Specialized Journalism =

The Knight Center for Specialized Journalism is a national program which that since 1987 has offered seminars for print, broadcast and online reporters, editors and editorial writers. At these seminars, journalists receive in-depth training in subjects related to their coverage—law, health, science, society, demographics, national and international affairs. Applications are sought from reporters and editors working for independent news organizations as well as from independent online and citizen journalists.

The Knight Center is funded by the John S. and James L. Knight Foundation and is affiliated with the University of Maryland's Philip Merrill College of Journalism.

The Knight Center for Specialized Journalism at Merrill College closed December 31, 2009, citing a shift in focus to "designing new approaches to the challenges of 21st-century journalism." Other Knight Centers focusing on other topics still exist, including the Knight Digital Media Center, a partnership of USC and UC Berkeley; and the Knight Center for Digital Media Entrepreneurship at Arizona State University.
