= The Thorn Birds (disambiguation) =

The Thorn Birds may refer to:

- The Thorn Birds, a 1977 novel by Colleen McCullough
- The Thorn Birds (miniseries), a 1983 miniseries based on the novel starring Richard Chamberlain
- The Thorn Birds (2011 TV series), a South Korean television series
- The Thorn Birds: The Missing Years, a 1996 miniseries related to the 1983 miniseries
- The Thorn Birds Musical, a 2009 musical adaptation of the novel
- The Thornbirds, a band including Russ Parrish and Stix Zadinia

== See also ==
- Thornbirds, the bird genus Phacellodomus
