= The Gravy Train Goes East =

British television sequel series (1991)

- Genre: Comedy drama Satire
- Created by: Malcolm Bradbury
- Written by: Malcolm Bradbury
- Directed by: James Cellan Jones
- Starring: Christoph Waltz; Ian Richardson; Jacques Sereys; Anita Zagaria; Jeremy Child; John Dicks; Henry Goodman; Janek Lesniak; Roger Lloyd-Pack; Cécile Paoli; Judy Parfitt; James Villiers; Francesca Annis; Trevor Peacock
- Composer: John E. Keane
- Country of origin: United Kingdom
- Original language: English
- No. of series: 1
- No. of episodes: 4

Production
- Executive producers: Victor Glynn; Andrew Warren
- Producers: Philip Hinchcliffe; Ian Warren
- Production locations: England, UK; Austria; Hungary
- Cinematography: Elemér Ragályi
- Editor: Barry Peters
- Running time: 52 minutes
- Production companies: Portman Productions in association with France 2 and ZDF

Original release
- Network: Channel 4
- Release: 28 October – 18 November 1991

Related
- The Gravy Train

The Gravy Train Goes East is a British satirical sequel comedy-drama series written and created by Malcolm Bradbury and directed by James Cellan Jones. The show starred Christoph Waltz and Ian Richardson. It was produced by Portman Productions in association with France 2 and ZDF for one series and four episodes and aired on Channel 4 between 28 October and 18 November 1991. It was a spiritual, but comical sequel to the successor, The Gravy Train in 1990, the last year.

== Plot ==
It was the sequel to The Gravy Train. Dorfman (from the first serial) has to assess the chances of the Balkan state of Slaka who want to join the E.C..

== Cast ==
- Christoph Waltz as Hans-Joachim Dorfmann
- Ian Richardson as Michael Spearpoint
- Jacques Sereys as Jean-Luc Villeneuve
- Anita Zagaria as Gianna Melchiori
- Jeremy Child as Felix Steadiman
- John Dicks as Larson Parson
- Henry Goodman as Ivo Tankic
- Janek Lesniak as Lazlo
- Roger Lloyd-Pack as Ferenc Plitplov
- Cécile Paoli as Galina Vitali
- Judy Parfitt as Hilda Spearpoint
- James Villiers as Penhurst
- Francesca Annis as Katya Princip
- Trevor Peacock as Father Wanko

== Episodes ==
No.	Title	Directed by	Written by	Original release date
1	"Episode 1"	James Cellan Jones	Malcolm Bradbury	28 October 1991
Following a democratic overthrow of its brutal communist dictator, the tiny Eastern European country of Slaka is keen to open up to the west. The E.C. is quick to pounce and ready it for acceding to the bloc, but the British Government has different plans. Whilst the former calls for the assistance of old hand Hans-Joachim Dorfmann, the latter sends in another equally old hand, Michael Spearpoint.
2	"Episode 2"	James Cellan Jones	Malcom Bradbury	4 November 1991
Dorfmann's naivety is exposed once more as both the Slakan President, and the mysterious Galina, seduce him; and a series of shady figures take him for drives around the city. Meanwhile Villeneuve's plotting continues, and he reveals to Gianna a dossier of gossip on Spearpoint...
3	"Episode 3"	James Cellan Jones	Malcom Bradbury	11 November 1991
After his unwilling nocturnal adventures, Hans finds himself equally in-demand during the day. The President is no less enamoured with him when they meet again, and British Ambassador Felix Steadiman is also keen to have a word, following a change in Government policy. But then so is Tankic, ensuring that an evening at the city's concert hall does not prove relaxing.
4	"Episode 4"	James Cellan Jones	Malcom Bradbury	18 November 1991
Fresh from his latest ordeal, Hans is interrogated by Tankic before being unceremoniously deported from Slaka amidst rumours of a secret fortune. Back in Brussels things are hotting up as the Brits solidify support for Slakan entry to the bloc whilst the rest of the states grow increasingly wary, but as President Princip flies into Brussels, Dorfmann heads to Luxembourg and meets the mysterious Galina Vitali again.

== Production locations ==
The series was shot in Austria, Hungary, and in England at Pinewood Studios.

== Home media ==
The complete second series was released on DVD by Simply Media in two-disc set on 8 October 2018.
