= Victor Glynn =

British television producer

- Born: 11 October 1956 (age 69); Balham, London, England
- Occupations: Television producer, writer
- Years active: 1982–present
- Spouse: Sophie Goldsworthy

Victor Glynn (born 11 October 1956) is a film and television producer and writer.

== Career ==
Glynn was born in Balham, London. After working for the BBC World Service for a number of years in the mid to late 1970s he joined Michael Bogdanov at the Young Vic Theatre, London as Press Officer. He then worked at a wide range of theatres as a publicist, including the Old Vic, Liverpool Playhouse, Oxford Playhouse and in the West End. He co-produced a number of plays at the Edinburgh Fringe and also Here's a Funny Thing, a play about Max Miller starring John Bardon at the Fortune Theatre in London in January 1982. This production was filmed for Channel Four and broadcast in November 1982. He maintained his involvement in theatre as a Director of the English Shakespeare Company from its inception in 1986 under the joint artistic direction of Michael Bogdanov and Michael Pennington.

At the age of 25, in 1982, he started producing independent films. Over the next three years he produced many productions for the nascent Channel Four. These included Good and Bad at Games, the first screenplay written by William Boyd, Michael Bogdanov's adaptation of Hiawatha with the National Theatre, and the Jack Gold's feature The Chain which starred Warren Mitchell, Bernard Hill, Nigel Hawthorne, Billie Whitelaw and Leo McKern. For the BBC and Masterpiece Theatre, he was Executive Producer of Noël Coward's Star Quality, a series of six plays which starred, among others, Judi Dench, Ian Holm, Susannah York, Ian Richardson, Patricia Hayes, Max Wall, Gary Waldhorn, Nigel Havers and a very young Hugh Laurie.

From 1984 until 1996 Glynn was with Portman Productions, later Portman Zenith Group, initially as Head of Production and for the last nine years as Chief Executive.

In 1987, Glynn co- produced Mike Leigh's film The Short and Curlies and in 1988 co-produced (with Simon Channing-Williams) the Mike Leigh feature High Hopes for Channel Four and Palace Pictures.

In 1988, having co-developed Home and Away and co-produced the pilot for Channel 7 in Sydney he introduced Home and Away to an unsuspecting UK audience on ITV. It has, at May 2018, run for over 6,800 episodes.

During this period the Portman expanded its production base considerably and in 1993 it acquired Zenith Productions from Carlton Communications and Paramount Pictures. Zenith, was probably best known as the producer of Inspector Morse for ITV. Zenith's other productions between 1992 and 1995 included 99:1 starring Leslie Grantham and Finney with David Morrissey and Andy Serkis for ITV, Hamish Macbeth starring Robert Carlyle and Byker Grove (cradle of Ant & Dec) for the BBC, and the feature films Amateur with Isabelle Huppert for Sony Pictures Classics and Deadly Advice starring Jane Horrocks and Jonathan Pryce.

His many productions in this period included Mike Newell's An Awfully Big Adventure based upon Beryl Bainbridge's novel and starring Hugh Grant, Alan Rickman and Prunella Scales; an adaptation of C. P. Taylor's And a Nightingale Sang with Joan Plowright and Stephen Tompkinson and which won the Prix Europa and Malcolm Bradbury's Silver Nymph-winning The Gravy Train and The Gravy Train Goes East with Ian Richardson, Francesca Annis and Oscar winner Christoph Waltz. Other productions included Christopher Hampton's Total Eclipse starring Leonardo DiCaprio and David Thewlis, the mini series Friday on my Mind starring Christopher Eccleston for BBC1 and an adaptation of Rosamunde Pilcher's September which featured Jacqueline Bisset, Jenny Agutter, Mariel Hemingway and Paul Guilfoyle.

Between 1996 and 2003 he was President of Golden Square Pictures/ Sony Pictures Television Productions (UK). Productions during this time included Urban Gothic and Don't Try This at Home.

Since 2003 he has been an executive producer and production or script consultant to a number of major production companies and commercial brands. His most recent credits include Mad to Be Normal, That Good Night starring John Hurt and Waiting for Anya starring Noah Schnapp, Jean Reno and Anjelica Huston. Chairman of GCB Films, he is also a Fellow of the Oxford Media Academy and a Fellow of the Royal Society of Arts, in London. A tutor and examiner at Oxford University Department for Continuing Education between 2009 and 2015, he continues to lecture on a regular basis at Oxford and other universities. He is an Industry Adviser at Saïd Business School. Between 2010 and 2015 he worked with Blackwell UK acting as liaison with Oxford University.

The story by The Brothers Glynn, Santa and the Pirates, written by Victor and illustrated by his brother Chris Glynn is being developed as an animated children's television series.

He was a co-producer of The Unbeatables, the UK version of Metegol, directed by Academy Award winner Juan Jose Campanella. The film was first released in Argentina in July 2013 and attracted an audience of more than two million people. The UK dub featured the voices of Rupert Grint and Rob Brydon and opened in August 2014 in the UK to wide acclaim. The film has won many awards including a Goya in Spain and the Grand Prize at the New York International Children's Film Festival in 2014.

== Family life ==
Glynn is married to Oxford-based publisher and photographer Sophie Goldsworthy. His first wife, Lorna Gillian (Gill) Glynn (née Hastilow), died in 1999.

He has four children. His daughter Harriet is a film executive who has worked with, among others, Morgan Freeman and the late B.B. King and his son Phin is a film producer who has worked with David Tennant and Elisabeth Moss on a movie about R. D. Laing. His elder daughter Katie is a school teacher. His youngest son Alfie is at school in Oxfordshire.

Glynn was a second cousin of the comedian and actor Dick Emery.
