= Michael Bogdanov =

British theatre director (1938–2017)

- Born: Michael Bogdin; 15 December 1938; Neath, Glamorgan, Wales
- Died: 16 April 2017 (aged 78); Greece
- Occupation: Theatre director
- Spouses: Patricia Ann Warwick (m. 1966–1998); Ulrike Engelbrecht (m. 2000–2017)

Michael Bogdanov (15 December 1938 – 16 April 2017) was a British theatre director known for his work with new plays, modern reinterpretations of Shakespeare, musicals and work for young people.

== Early years ==
Bogdanov was born Michael Bogdin in Neath, Glamorgan, to a Jewish father (Francis Benzion Bogdin) and a Welsh mother (Rhoda Rees). He was educated at The John Lyon School, Harrow on the Hill, England, at Trinity College Dublin, and in Germany and France. He trained at BBC in the 1960s and produced, wrote and directed for television in the UK and Ireland. He was a producer and director at Irish broadcaster RTÉ from 1966 to 1969, and later extensively worked for BBC Wales, making documentaries and feature films, winning several awards.

== Career ==
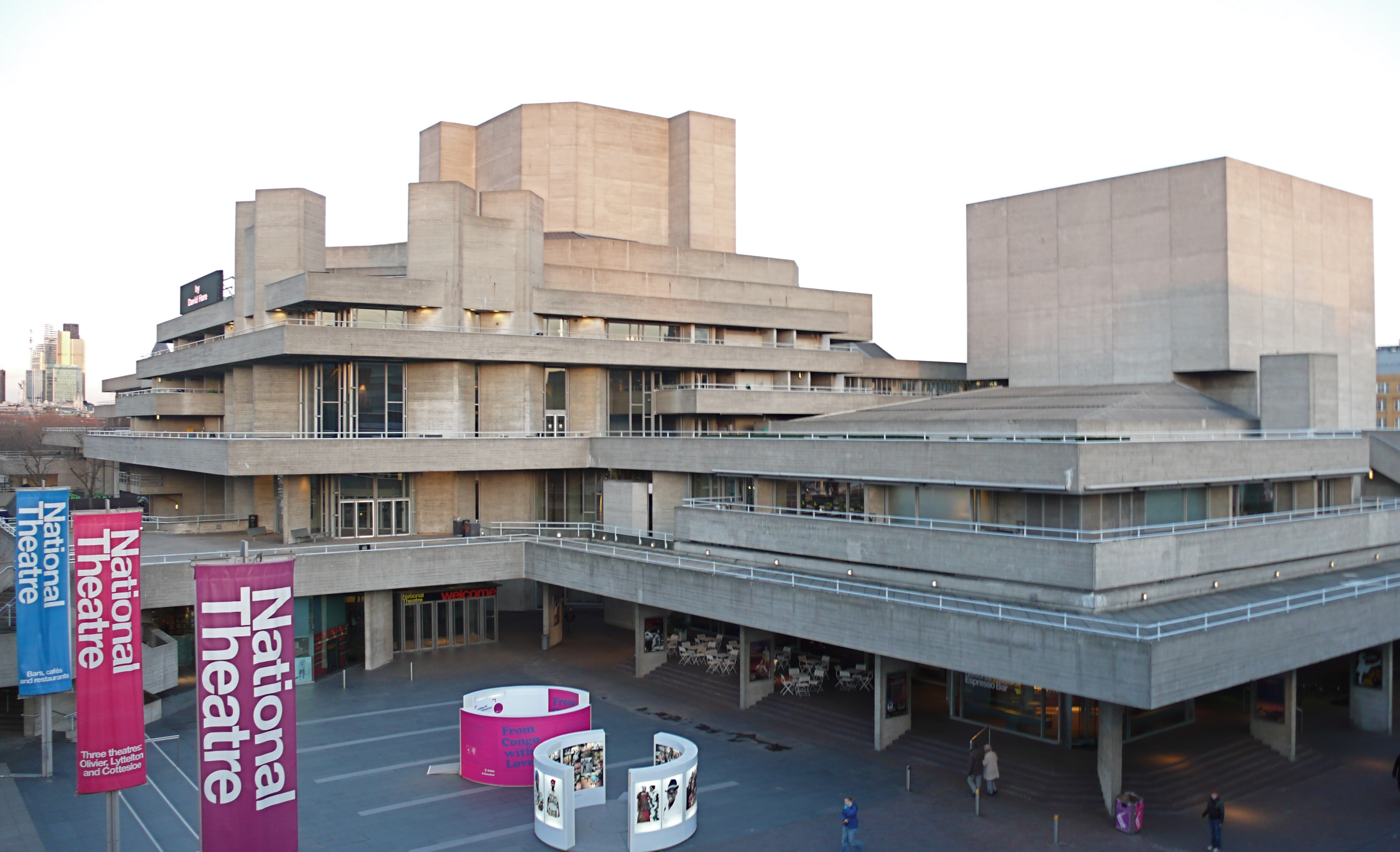
The National Theatre in 2010

Bogdanov was director of the Leicester Theatre Trust in Leicester from 1973 to 1977, with responsibility for both the Phoenix Theatre and the new Haymarket Theatre which was built in 1973 to supersede and operate alongside the smaller Phoenix. He directed eight productions for the Royal Shakespeare Company, including The Taming of the Shrew for which he received a Director of the Year award in 1979. From 1980 to 1988, he was associate director of the National Theatre where he directed about 15 productions. These included, in 1980, Howard Brenton's The Romans in Britain, which resulted in a private prosecution in which Bogdanov was accused by counsel for Christian morality campaigner Mary Whitehouse of "procuring an act of gross indecency" in one scene where two male actors simulated anal rape. However, 15 months later when it came to court, Whitehouse's barrister abandoned the prosecution, saying in court: "The consequences of conviction - irrespective of penalty - would greatly damage Mr Bogdanov in his personal and professional life".

During the 1980s, Bogdanov also worked internationally, directing Hamlet at the Abbey Theatre, Dublin, Romeo and Juliet at the Imperial Theatre, Tokyo, and Measure for Measure at Stratford, Ontario. His opera credits included the world premiere of Stockhausen's Montag aus Licht at La Scala, Milan. At the Deutsches Schauspielhaus in Hamburg (Germany's equivalent of the Royal National Theatre), he directed an award-winning Julius Caesar, and adapted and directed Goethe's The Story of Reynard the Fox. From 1989 to 1992, he became Chief Executive of the Deutsches Schauspielhaus.

In 1986, Bogdanov and actor Michael Pennington founded the English Shakespeare Company. As joint artistic director, he directed the company's inaugural productions of The Henrys and, in 1987, the seven-play history cycle of The Wars of the Roses, which toured worldwide. For this ambitious programme he earned the 1990 Laurence Olivier Award for Best Director. In the 1990s he directed the English Shakespeare Company's international productions of Coriolanus, The Winter's Tale, Macbeth and The Tempest.

He continued to direct productions around the world in the 1990s, including a revival of the musical Hair at the Old Vic in London in 1993, his own version of the Anglo-Saxon epic poem Beowulf for both the Royal National Theatre of Denmark in 1994 and the English Shakespeare Company in London in 1997, Peer Gynt for the Residenz Theatre in Munich in 1995, Goethe's Faust Parts 1 and 2] for the Royal Shakespeare Company, Antony and Cleopatra and As You Like It for the English Theatre Company in 1998, Timon of Athens for the Shakespeare Repertory Theater in Chicago in 1999, and Macbeth for the Residenz Theater in Munich, again in 1999.

From 2002 to 2004, Bogdanov took charge of productions at the Ludlow Castle Open Air Theatre as part of the annual Ludlow Festival. With an ensemble of mainly Welsh players, he produced The Merry Wives of Windsor, The Winter's Tale, The Merchant of Venice, Cymbeline and Twelfth Night.

In 2003, he was involved in setting up the Wales Theatre Company, based in Swansea and Cardiff, taking on the position of artistic director. He directed productions of both Shakespeare and new works, including Twelfth Night, Cymbeline, The Merchant of Venice and Dylan Thomas's Under Milk Wood. In 2005, he directed the critically acclaimed musical, Amazing Grace, at Swansea Grand Theatre and the Sherman Theatre, Cardiff, and the dual Welsh and English language productions of Hamlet, with the same cast, at The Swansea Grand and Cardiff's New Theatre. The new Welsh Language translation by Gareth Miles was commissioned by the Arts Council of Wales.

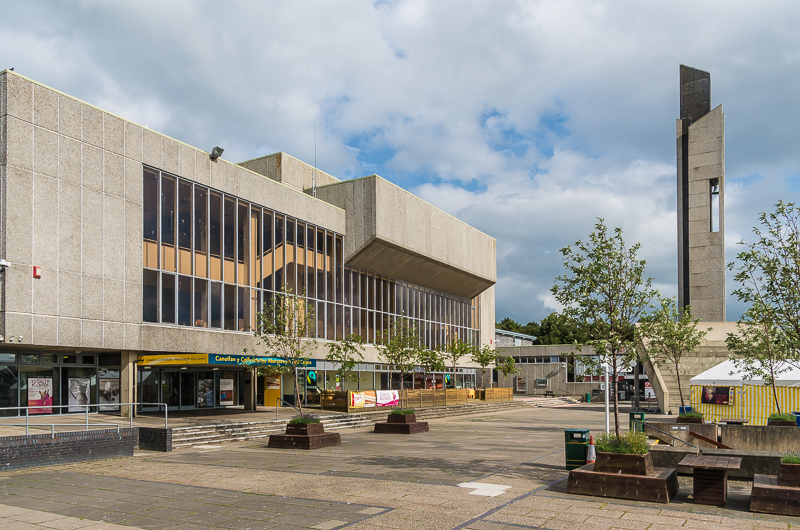
The Aberystwyth Arts Centre in 2015

Among his many TV credits are Shakespeare on the Estate, RTS Award, Bafta Nomination and A Light in the Valley, RTS Best Regional Programme Award. Bogdanov has also directed three musicals for Aberystwyth Arts Centre: Fiddler on the Roof, West Side Story and My Fair Lady.

In 2006, Bogdanov brought his production of Mal Pope's musical Amazing Grace in Cardiff to sell-out performances at the Wales Millennium Centre, with every show ending in a standing ovation. It was the first Welsh musical on the national stage of Wales. Judith Isherwood, the centre's chief executive, said of the show's success noting: "A new musical, Amazing Grace, was presented by the Wales Theatre Company — Welsh writers, and a very Welsh story about a revivalist preacher. It had a huge response. I’ve had letters from people saying how emotional they felt about seeing Welsh history re-created on their national stage". The show was described by critic Michael Kelligan as being the "first great Welsh musical".

Bogdanov returned to musical theatre in 2009, directing a musical version of Colleen McCullough’s bestselling novel The Thorn Birds for the Wales Theatre Company. It has music by German opera composer Gloria Bruni and McCullough herself wrote the book and lyrics. It opened at the Grand Theatre, Swansea in April and then toured the UK, culminating at the Wales Millennium Centre. This production starred Matthew Goodgame, Helen Anker and Peter Karrie.

Bogdanov continued to work extensively in Germany, above all in Hamburg, where he has won awards for productions at the Kammerspiele which include Der Diener Zweier Herren, Der Garderobier, Warten auf Godot, Elling and Frost/Nixon. In 2011 he directed A Midsummer Night's Dream in Platt as the opening production of the new Ohnsorg-Theater in Hamburg, which had moved from its old location into a newly built theatre.

His essays on Shakespeare were published in a critically acclaimed book: Shakespeare: The Director's Cut; in 2003, followed by a second volume focusing on the histories in 2005.

Bogdanov died of a heart attack on 16 April 2017, aged 78.
