= Hutchinson Novella =

Series of short novels

Hutchinson Novellas was a series of short novels published by the Hutchinson Group in the United Kingdom and Australia in the late 1980s. The books were also published as The Harper Short Novel Series in the United States.

== Bibliography ==
- Brian Aldiss, Ruins (1987) ISBN 0-09-167860-9
- Malcolm Bradbury, Cuts (1987) ISBN 0-09-168280-0
- Christopher Hope, Black Swan (1987) ISBN 0-09-172542-9
- Francis King, Frozen Music (1987) ISBN 0-09-170560-6
- Maurice Leitch, Chinese Whispers (1987) ISBN 0-09-172727-8
- Colleen McCullough, The Ladies of Missalonghi (1987) ISBN 0-09-170600-9
- Ruth Rendell, Heartstones (1987) ISBN 0-09-167870-6
- Alan Sillitoe, Out of the Whirlpool (1987) ISBN 0-09-168300-9
- William Trevor, Nights at the Alexandra (1987) ISBN 0-09-168460-9
- Fay Weldon, The Rules of Life (1987) ISBN 0-09-168680-6
- J. G. Ballard, Running Wild (1988) ISBN 0-09-173498-3
- Peter Levi, To the Goat (1988) ISBN 0-09-173627-7
- Nigel Williams, Black Magic (1988) ISBN 0-09-170950-4
- Anthony Burgess, The Devil's Mode (1989) ISBN 0-09-174194-7
- Frank Delaney, My Dark Rosaleen (1989) ISBN 0-09-173869-5
- Paul Theroux, Dr DeMarr (1990) ISBN 0-09-173612-9
