= Mary & Tim =

- Genre: Romantic drama
- Based on: Tim by Michael Pate; Tim by Colleen McCullough
- Teleplay by: Ann Beckett
- Directed by: Glenn Jordan
- Starring: Candice Bergen; Richard Kiley; Tom McCarthy; Louise Latham; Kelli Williams
- Music by: Michel Colombier
- Country of origin: United States
- Original language: English

Production
- Executive producer: Robert Halmi
- Producer: Glenn Jordan
- Cinematography: Neil Roach
- Editor: David A. Simmons
- Running time: 92 minutes
- Production companies: Holiday Productions; Hallmark Entertainment

Original release
- Network: CBS
- Release: November 3, 1996

Mary & Tim is a 1996 American romantic drama television film directed by Glenn Jordan and written by Ann Beckett. It is a remake of the 1979 Australian film Tim, which was based on the 1974 novel by Colleen McCullough. Mary Horton (Candice Bergen), a 50-something year old widow, begins a romance with Tim Melville (Thomas McCarthy), a mentally disabled gardener 30 years her junior. The film aired on CBS on November 3, 1996.

== Cast ==
- Candice Bergen as Mary Horton
- Richard Kiley as Ron Melville
- Tom McCarthy as Tim Melville
- Louise Latham as Forbsie
- Kelli Williams as Justine Melville
