= Matthew Goodgame =

British actor

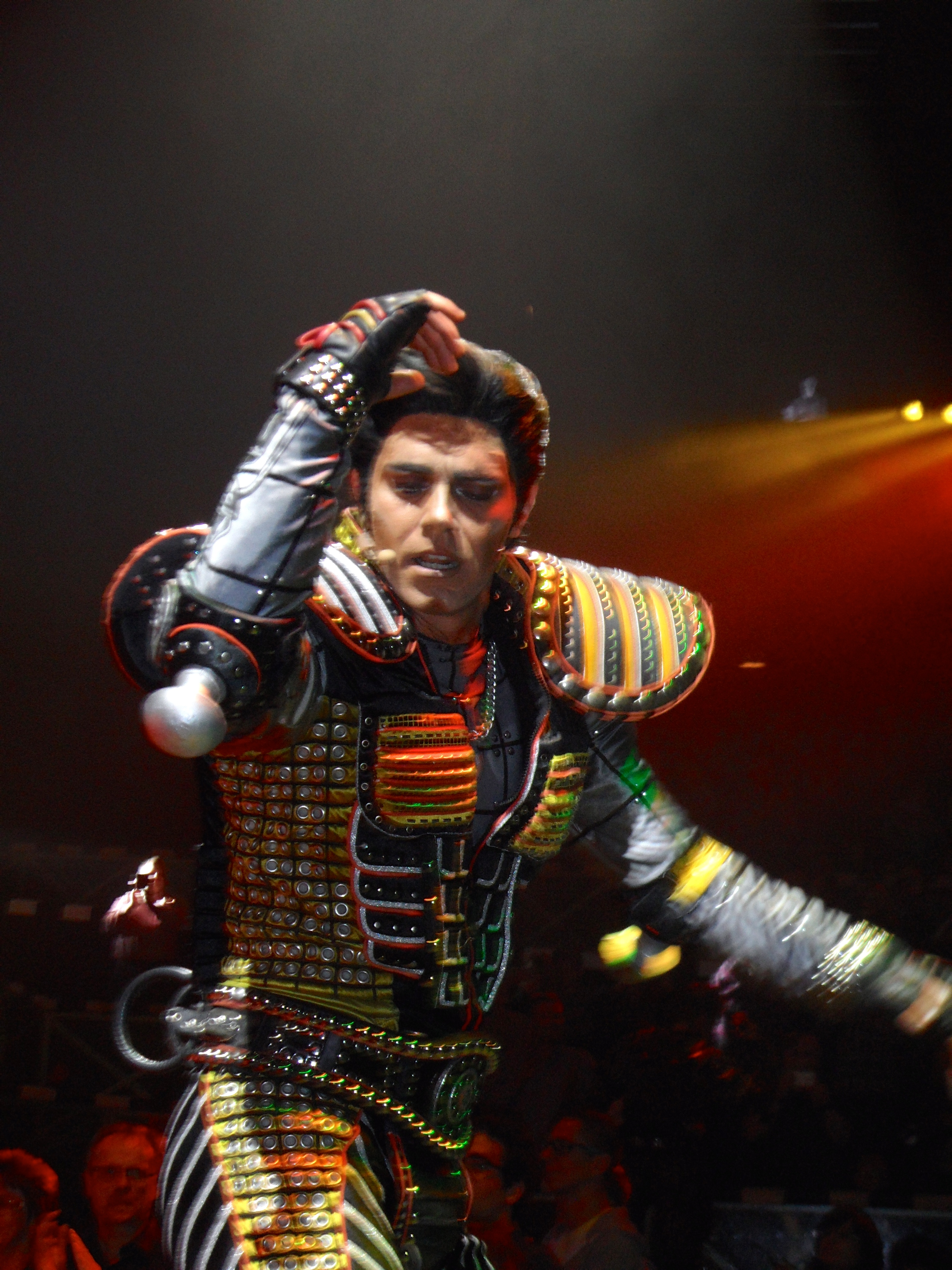
Matthew Goodgame as Greaseball.

Matthew Goodgame (born c.1980) is a professional actor, singer and dancer from Kent.

He made his professional and West End debut in November 2004 playing Billy Flynn in Chicago at the Adelphi Theatre, after winning the Channel 4 series Musicality. Goodgame went on to record his debut album Musicality - The Winners Album with EMI. Since then Goodgame has reprised the role of Billy Flynn on visits to both Singapore and Las Vegas, with the Cellophane Company. Goodgame was asked to perform at Stephen Sondheim's 75th Birthday Gala at the Theatre Royal, Drury Lane, and also at Gordon Ramsay's 40th Birthday celebrations.

Goodgame spent eight months out of the country performing as the lead production vocalist for Costa Cruise Lines, in the Caribbean and Europe, and on his return to the UK played the lead role of Jack in the workshop of a new musical, Waiting for the Dawn at the Arts Theatre, London.

Matthew Goodgame has performed in the German tour of Cats, playing the lead role of Munkustrap.

Matthew Goodgame starred in The Thorn Birds (A New Musical), playing the lead role of Father Ralph de Bricassart, which Richard Chamberlain played in the iconic television miniseries. It was the concluding production of Wales Theatre Company under the direction of Michael Bogdanov.

Goodgame has just finished playing Steven Kodaly in 'She Loves Me' at the Chichester Festival Theatre, after playing the role of Danny Zuko in the West End production of GREASE The Musical. Matthew closed the West End Production of Grease.

He recently created a trio called The Spinettes and is managing them as they break through into the entertainment industry.

In 2016, Goodgame performed in Funny Girl at the Savoy Theatre, playing the role of Director/Paul/Renaldi and covering Nick Arnstein.

In 2018 Goodgame joined the UK cast of 42nd Street, performing as Pat Denning.
