= The Blue Castle =

1926 novel by Lucy Maud Montgomery

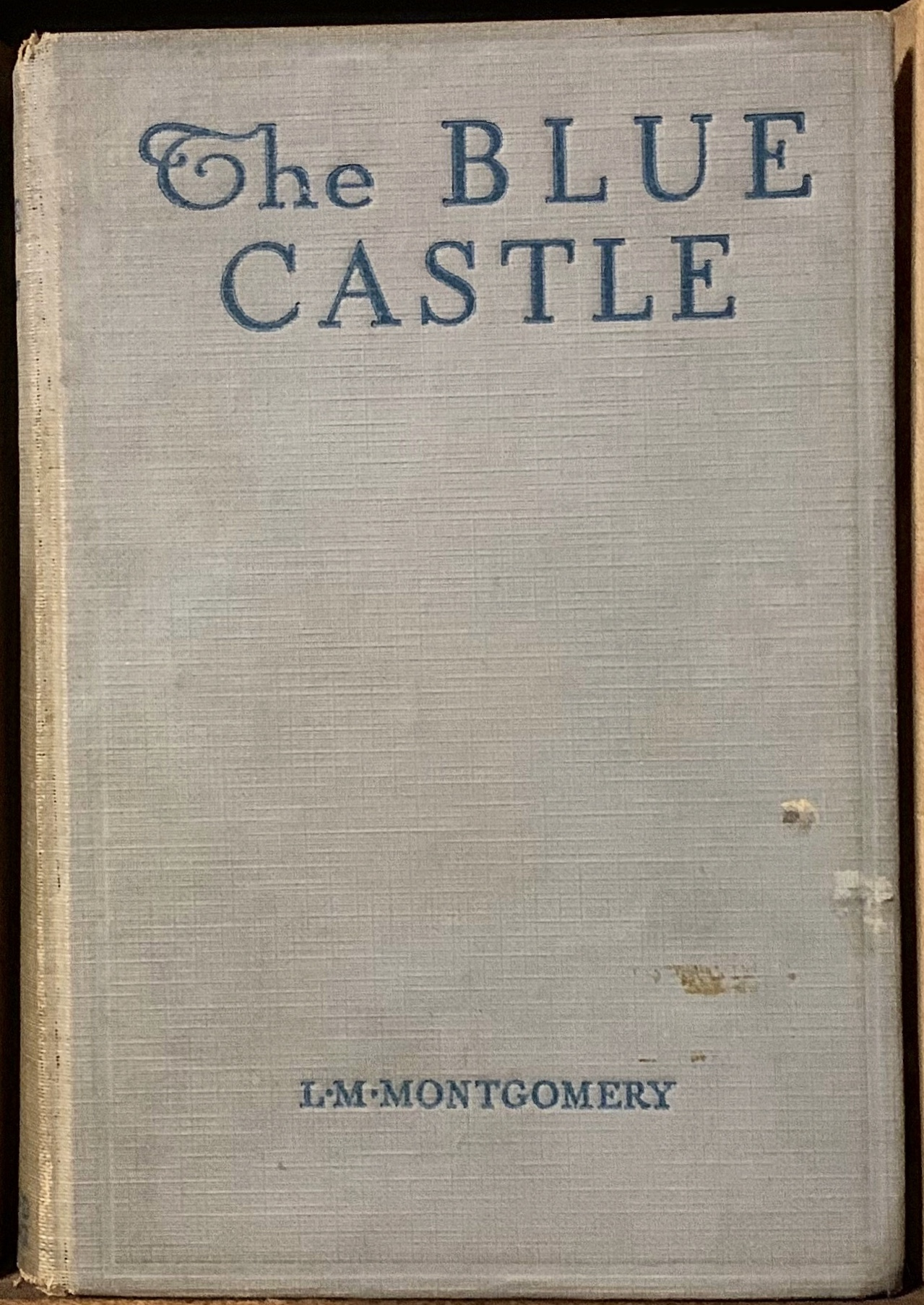
- First edition
- Author: L. M. Montgomery
- Language: English
- Genre: Romance novel
- Publisher: McClelland and Stewart (Canada); Frederick A. Stokes (US)
- Publication date: 1926
- Publication place: Canada
- Media type: Print (Hardback & Paperback)
- Pages: 310 pp (first edition); 218 (fourth edition)
- ISBN: 0-553-28051-1 (1992 mass market paperback edition), ISBN 1-55002-666-6 (2007 trade paperback edition)
- OCLC: 19674972
- Text: The Blue Castle at Wikisource

The Blue Castle is a 1926 novel by Canadian author Lucy Maud Montgomery, best known for her novel Anne of Green Gables (1908).

The story is set during the early 1900s in the fictional town of Deerwood, located in the Muskoka region of Ontario, Canada. Deerwood is based on Bala, Ontario, which Montgomery visited in 1922. Maps of the two towns show similarities.

This novel is considered one of L.M. Montgomery's few adult works of fiction, along with A Tangled Web, and is the only book she wrote that is entirely set outside of Prince Edward Island. It has grown in popularity since being republished in 1990. The book was adapted for the stage twice; in 1982 it was made into a successful Polish musical, and ten years later Canadian playwright Hank Stinson authored another version, The Blue Castle: A Musical Love Story.

Colleen McCullough, author of The Thorn Birds, evidently used The Blue Castle as the basis of her novel The Ladies of Missalonghi—subconsciously, as she alleged—to the point of provoking accusations of plagiarism.

== Plot summary ==
Valancy is, at 29, the old maid of the Stirling clan, a family that has lived in the same region for over fifty years. As an only child, her life has been spent with her mother, aunt, and an extended family who actively discourage happiness and treat Valancy like a child. Her only respites come from daydreaming of her "Blue Castle" and the handsome men who would reside in it with her, along with reading the nature books of John Foster.

Valancy is shockingly diagnosed with a fatal heart ailment when she goes in for a checkup, a fact she keeps secret from all of her family, since she goes to a doctor that is not considered the 'right' one, because her family has a long-lived feud with his family.

Believing she has very little time left to live, she decides to break free from the oppressive constraints, expectations, and obligations her ever-judging family has laid on her since birth. She has always judged them objectively and secretly laughed at their hypocrisy and self-righteousness. Now she decides that she shouldn't let her ever-judging relatives stop her from having a chance to 'live', letting everyone know what she thinks of them and their everyday, strife-filled actions. She starts saying aloud what she thinks of them, causing the Stirlings to conclude that she has suddenly gone 'dippy' and that they must somehow 'fix' her through prayer for her soul, guilting her, and pretending that what she does won't make them think that she is a heretic.

Valancy then scandalizes the clan even more by moving out of her mother's house and taking a position as a housekeeper for her very ill childhood friend Cissy Gay and her father, who is a master carpenter and notorious town drunk named Roaring Abel. Cissy is dying of consumption, but is socially ostracized for having had a child out of wedlock. The child had died soon after being born, and Cissy wasted away from her sickness and the perpetual misery of losing her beloved baby. Cissy and Valancy share a room and renew their friendship. Valancy enjoys earning a salary and spending her money in ways her family would not approve of – such as purchasing a brightly-coloured, low-necked dress. But her real satisfaction comes from doing something worthwhile, and doing it well. She also meets and spends time with Barney Snaith, who is a good friend of both Abel and Cissy, but whom town gossips are convinced is a criminal in hiding, a horrible drunk like Roaring Abel, and/or the father of Cissy's illegitimate, now-deceased child.

Towards the end, Cissy confides in Valancy, telling her about the man she fell in love with but refused to marry because he no longer loved her. Her baby compensated for her heartache, but when the infant died she was devastated. Cissy passes away quietly and Valancy makes all the funeral arrangements, setting the house in order for Abel before leaving.

All this time, the Stirling prestige has suffered from Valancy's actions, her 'going into service' and associating with 'lowlifes"; several unsuccessful attempts are made to have her come 'home.' Now they assume she will move back to live with her mother and aunt, who would magnanimously forgive her recent behaviour and gloss it over as an act of 'Christian charity'. They are appeased after the funeral when Valancy agrees that she will not stay with Roaring Abel - unaware that she has other plans. She proposes marriage to Barney, revealing that she is dying and wants to enjoy the remaining time she has left. She does not confess her love for him, instead telling him that she is 'crazy about him' and that it's one of the reasons why she picked him as a potential husband. Barney agrees to marry her, and they have a quiet ceremony the next day in the next town over. Valancy's family, who found a good match for her while she was housekeeping, are horrified by her marriage to such a 'disreputable' man (whose real crime is being unconventional and not being related to a 'good family' from the area) and effectively disown her.

Barney takes Valancy to his home on a wooded island located on Lake 'Mistawis,' which Valancy sees as the 'Blue Castle' of her imaginings. They build a contented life together, though he forbids her from ever entering a certain room which she dubs 'Bluebeard's Chamber', claiming that he could have multiple wives strung up on the walls by their hair. Barney and Valancy share wonderful conversations and take long walks on the mainland, she often quoting from books by John Foster, which he abhors and refuses to listen to. They celebrate Christmas, he giving her the only gift she asked for: a necklace of pearl beads.

Valancy also takes the time to exorcise old demons, building a large sand pile to make up for one that her cousin Olive had stolen from her when they were in grade school. Also, while Valancy is collecting moss and flowers to decorate their cabin, she comes upon Allan Tierney, a celebrated painter of beautiful women, who, when he sees her, hastens to find Barney and asks to paint her portrait, which he declines. Valancy agrees with his decision, although she wishes that Olive, her snooty cousin, would hear that Allan Tierney wanted to paint her.

The year that she had to live is almost over when Valancy is nearly killed by an oncoming train, her fancy heeled shoe caught in a train track. Barney saves her in the nick of time, risking his own life to do so. After the shock passes, Valancy realizes that she should have died of it - the doctor warned that any sudden shock would kill her. Barney is likewise stunned by the experience and retreats to his beloved woods and Bluebeard's Chamber to think. Valancy assumes that he has left because, having married her out of pity, he now realizes he is trapped in a marriage he doesn't desire.

Valancy returns to the doctor, who discovers that he sent Valancy "Stirling" a letter with a diagnosis meant for Miss "Sterling," an elderly, spinster patient who visited him on the same day and had a fatal heart condition; Valancy's letter went to her instead. While equally painful, Valancy's condition was temporary and could be healed from a sudden jolt of happiness, sadness, or adrenaline.

Arriving home from the doctor depressed, with Barney still away, she finds a gaudily dressed man waiting near their home. He introduces himself as Barney's father, Dr. Redfern, the multi-millionaire inventor of Dr. Redfern's patent medicines. Dr. Redfern explains that a decade earlier Bernard Snaith Redfern abruptly left home without a word, having dumped the girlfriend he thought loved him, finding out she was a gold-digger. Dr. Redfern had no idea where his son was (as Barney was constantly traveling and only sent a few postcards) until Barney withdrew $15,000 (+/-$226,000 in 2023) from his bank account to purchase a pearl necklace from a reputable jewelry house. Dr. Redfern is a genial man overall, and although sad that he wasn't invited to the wedding, is pleased that Barney has settled down and asks that Barney come home as he is the only family he has.

Thinking that Barney believes she tricked him into marriage and that he still loves his ex-girlfriend, Valancy decides to leave him and return to her mother's house. While searching for pen and paper to write Barney an explanatory note, she unthinkingly goes into 'Bluebeard's Chamber' and discovers that he is also 'John Foster,' her favourite author. She writes the note, explaining the mix-up behind her diagnosis and asking for a divorce, knowing now that he can afford it and leaves behind the necklace, which she had earlier thought an expensive imitation.

Valancy returns home despondent and reveals to her family that Barney is the son of famous and wealthy Dr. Redfern, as well as the noted literary figure John Foster. Barney's wealth instantly erases any misgivings her family had about him, and they are determined that Barney and Valancy should stay together; her wealthy uncle, Benjamin, knowing now that she has married a millionaire's son - therefore redeeming herself - un-disowns her.

Barney, after meeting his father, finds Valancy's note and rushes to town to see her and ask her to come back. Barney's absence after the train incident was due to the stunned realization that he had grown to love her so much, he would not want to live without her and so he was contemplating contacting his father for the first time in a decade to ask for money to pay for expensive medical treatments that could somehow heal her. At first she refuses, believing that he is only asking out of pity, but when he becomes angry, thinking she is ashamed of his father's patent medicine business just like his ex-girlfriend was, she realizes he does love her and agrees to return.

Barney reconciles with his father but will not live with him; they will build a home of their own out in the country, but near enough to visit. Meanwhile Barney and Valancy prepare to go on the honeymoon they never had, albeit extended and while touring Europe, knowing their summer home on Barney's small island - her 'Blue Castle' - will be waiting for them.

In a postscript, Olive is writing to her fiancee, Cecil Bruce, telling him about Valancy marrying Barney and how they discovered he was a millionaire in his own right, and how now every single relative is positively fawning over the couple. In an almost jealous diatribe, she wonders why some people can make their entire lives an utter mess with their adventures and yet end up married to a rich person, and she says that if this is what happens when someone runs away and flouts family expectations, then what is the use in behaving?

== Characters ==
- Valancy Jane Stirling, called "Doss" by her family
- Barney Snaith, actually Bernard Snaith Redfern, and author 'John Foster'
- Mrs. Frederick Stirling (Amelia), Valancy's mother
- Cousin Christine Stickles, a widowed aunt who lives with Valancy and her mother
- Cousin Olive, Valancy's much courted and beautiful cousin
- Cousin Georgiana, another elderly widow
- Uncle Benjamin, bachelor proprietor of the local general store
- Aunt Alberta & Uncle Herbert, the Stirling's 'power couple'
- Aunt & Uncle Wellington
- Uncle James, stern, cold-hearted oracle of the family
- Dr. Trent, the doctor who misdiagnoses Valancy
- Cecilia "Cissy" Gay, a childhood friend of Valancy's
- Roaring Abel Gay, Cissy Gay's unruly father
- Dr. Stalling, the reverend of the Stirlings' Anglican church
- Mr. Towers, the pastor of Valancy's favorite Free Methodist church
- Edward Beck, an elderly widower who contemplates marriage with Valancy
- Ethel Traverse, a woman Barney had previously been in love with
- Dr. J. Redfern, Barney's multi-millionaire father

== First Edition notes ==
Almost all editions of The Blue Castle lack dust jackets. The true first edition does not have a castle on the front boards; it was added after Montgomery had commented, "Not so pretty. A plain cover."

== See also ==
- The Ladies of Missalonghi, similar novel by Colleen McCullough
