= Slaka (fiction) =

Fictional location

- Rates of Exchange and Why Come to Slaka? location
- Created by: Malcolm Bradbury
- Genre: Utopian and dystopian fiction

In-universe information
- Type: Fantasy world
- Locations: Slaka, Glit

Slaka is the imaginary East European COMECON country featured in two books of the English novelist Malcolm Bradbury (1932–2000).

== Characteristics ==
The country features in Bradbury's novels Rates of Exchange (1983) and Why Come to Slaka? (1986). It is described by its leader Comrade-General I. Vulcani as "a nation proud of its socialistik emulations." The first novel relates the misadventures of a visiting British academic; the second is a pastiche guide book to the country. Slaka is also the name of the country's capital; another of the country's major towns is Glit. The country's language is known as Slakan.

Slaka was further explored in television, in two mini-series scripted by Bradbury, The Gravy Train, and a sequel The Gravy Train Goes East.

Critics have proposed that Slaka is a satire of Romania during the 1980s, or possibly Bulgaria.

== National opera ==
The country's national opera is Vedontakal Vrop (The Secret Unmasked) by the composer Z. Leblat who also wrote the libretto. The opera is described in Why Come to Slaka? as "one of the highest treasures of the great Slakan tradition." The opera, which in Rates of Exchange is said to last about five hours, was originally performed before Bishop 'Wencher' Vlam and his guests at the Bishop's castle, the Cast'ullu Vlam, in the city of Slaka in 1770. The score was then lost for 200 years but was rediscovered, missing only act 3, in 1970. In Rates of Exchange, the restored opera was premiered in 1982 but in Why Come to Slaka?, the premiere was said to have been in 1984. In either case, Bradbury set the event in the Oper Prole'tanuu Slakam, under the baton of Leo Fenycx, in a season which also included works by Andrew Lloyd Webber and Leoš Janáček. Bradbury goes on to describe the work to be considered by Slakan scholars to have been an important inspiration for the operas of Mozart and Rossini. The traditions of Leblat are maintained by the annual "Z. Leblat Musicology Festivi" which is held on a mountain near another Slakan town, Glit.

The role of the opera in Bradbury's book is seen by Vinod Gopi as symbolising the 'play with desire' seen by Theodor W. Adorno and Max Horkheimer as a characteristic of mass culture. "The maximum play of desire is seen in the opera Vedontakal Vrop ... The characters appear on the stage wearing exotic and extravagant costumes. The plot shows a proliferation of characters who have dressed themselves in a way that obscures their identity ... [presenting] a domain of decadence and excess."

According to the Slakan writer F. Plitplov, "the plot of Vedontakal Vrop is so laughable that no one can fail to take a delight in its immense confusions." Its characters include a magician (in some opinions an apothecary), a student disguised as an old man, a girl disguised as a soldier, a servant who is turned into a bear, servants of a shah and villagers with a large cake. The resolution of the plot is not clearly outlined by Bradbury, one of whose characters explains "in the ending all becomes clear, if not in the way those people intend", adding that for an opera "such confusions are essential."

== See also ==
- List of fictional countries
- List of fictional literature featuring opera

== Sources ==
- Bradbury, Malcolm (1983). Rates of Exchange. London: Secker and Warburg. ISBN 9780099340003.
- — (1986). Why Come to Slaka?. London: Secker and Warburg. ISBN 9780436065064.
- Gopi, Vinod (2010). Chapter 3, "The Aesthetic of Pluralism", in The Culture of Excess in Malcolm Bradbury's 'The History Man', 'Rates of Exchange' and 'Doctor Criminale', thesis submitted to Mahatma Gandhi University, Kerala. hdl:10603/197 Accessed 9 September 2019.
- Harvey-Wood, Harriet (28 November 2000). "Obituary: Sir Malcolm Bradbury". The Guardian.
- Turp, Craig (April 27, 2010). "Great Books in English about Romania No. 2: Rates of Exchange, by Malcolm Bradbury". Archived from the original on 2010-04-29.
- Vianu, Lidia (1999). "At the Gates of Commonsense – Malcolm Bradbury (1932–2000)". British Literary Desperadoes at the Turn of the Millennium. Bucharest: ALL Publishing House. ISBN 978-9739431484 – via lidiavianu.scriptmania.com.
