= Frieda Fishbein =

American theatrical and literary agent (1886–1981)

- Frieda Fishbein from 1933 newspaper
- Born: March 7, 1886; Romania
- Died: September 6, 1981 (aged 95); Brooklyn, New York, U.S.
- Occupations: Theatrical and literary agent

Frieda Fishbein (March 7, 1886 - September 6, 1981) was a Romanian-American theatrical, film, television and literary agent for writers including Elmer Rice, George S. Kaufman, Moss Hart, Jean-Paul Sartre, Jean Anouilh, and Colleen McCullough.

== Personal life and education ==
Fishbein was born in Romania, the eldest daughter of Molly and Osias Fishbein. The family emigrated to the United States in 1901. She was educated in the New Orleans public school system, then spent the majority of her adult life in New York City, initially Manhattan, and then moving to Brooklyn in later life.

== Work ==
Fishbein worked as a stenographer in New Orleans in 1903. After moving to New York City, her first job was as a secretary in a movie company. In 1910, she was again working as a stenographer.

In 1929, Fishbein established the Frieda Fishbein Agency, a literary and theatrical agency, in New York City. In the same year, the playwright, director and producer Dore Schary described her as having "a stable of young writers, none of whom she could support, except with praise and enthusiasm." He credited Fishbein with helping to get him his first job in Hollywood as a "$100-a-week writer" by introducing him to Harry Cohn, "the maharajah of Columbia [studio]".

By 1932, she was on the advisory board of the New York Stage Society. Her agency moved to the New Amsterdam Theatre in 1937.

During an interview in 1946, she made the observation that many writers who had returned from the war had bought back partly completed plays. She believed the war had given them stamina and that they were sticking to their craft "more tenaciously".

The following year, she made theatrical headlines across America, by developing a new approach to selling shows. She would arrange for scripts to be acted out by semi-pros, filmed and the reel was submitted to prospective producers. According to an interview in 1954, she would receive "about ten plays a week". She would accept "about five a year, and would sell about 8-10 options a year."

After Fishbein's death in 1981, her niece, Janice Fishbein, continued as the president of her agency.

=== Plays and playwrights ===
Fishbein represented the following writers and plays:

Year	Playwright	Play	Notes	Ref.
1925	Spencer Brodney	Rebel Smith		
1929	Elmer Rice	Street Scene	Fishbein took the play on after it had been turned down by several Broadway producers; it went on to win the Pulitzer Prize for Drama	
1929	Elmer Rice	See Naples and Die		
1929	Wallace Thurman	Harlem		
1930	Moss Hart	No Retreat		
1930	Moss Hart	Once In A Lifetime	Fishbein brought a lawsuit against Hart contending that she was entitled to a percentage of his royalties from plays produced by Sam Harris. The matter was settled out of court for an undisclosed sum.	
1931	I.J. Golden	Precedent		
1934	Jacques Deval	Prayer for the Living		
1937	Simon Gantillon and Harold Igo	Steel		
1937	Sidney Shields	Marriage A La King		
1937	Martin Cumberland	Climbing		
1937	Dr. Conrad K. Gale	Dr. Almighty		
1938	Miss Trent Patterson	The Lady Must Eat		
1938	Ralph Holmes	The Travelling Salesman and the Farmer's Daughter		
1938	Irving Ellman	Crime Doesn't Pay		
1938	Maria M. Coxe	If Ye Break Faith		
1939	Pamela Burr	The Odd Man		
1939	Wilson Starbuck	Sea Dogs		
1941	Frederick Schlick	None But The Wounded; Because I Am A Woman		
1942	E. Mawby Green and Edward Allen Feilbert	The House In Paris		
1943	Howard Buermann and Alfred Golden	Help Wanted – Female		
1944	George Taylor and George Savage	The Phoenix and the Dwarfs		
1946	Paul Bowles	The Respectful Prostitute	Translation of Sartre	
1946	Paul Bowles	No Exit	Translation of Sartre	
1946	John E. Miller	The Search for Love	Fishbein also produced	
1947	Paul Bowles	The Flies	Adaptation of Sartre's play	
1949	Madeline Davidson and Maurice Glucher	The Perfect Pattern		
1949	Howard Bluerman and Alfred Golden	A Lovely Time		
1950	John S. Gordan	For Each Man Kills		
1951	Jean-Paul Sartre	The Devil and God		
1953	John Sheffield	The Forgotten Land		
1960	Weldon Sheerer	California, Here I Come		

Fishbein wrote at least one play herself, Pajama Tops, in 1963.

=== Authors ===
She represented authors Peter Kenna, Sherwood Anderson, Katherine Hoskins, Donald Burgett and Alice White.

Her biggest financial success came from representing Australian author Colleen McCullough. According to McCullough, she was making her sister a tuna fish casserole for her birthday and while looking through a list of agents, she found Fishbein's name, which she took to be a sign. McCullough's first novel Tim (1974) was followed by the global hit The Thorn Birds (1977), selling over 33 million copies. As a "multi-million dollar product", Fishbein was able to retire on her share of the book.

== Act One ==
Fishbein appears as a character in Act One, a musical by James Lapine, adapted from the autobiography by Moss Hart. Her role is described "A literary agent. Highly respected in the community, so whatever plays she recommended for production were read with promptness and great enthusiasm. A bit of a character, she's tough and realistic, but very supportive of her client, Moss." The Teacher Resource Guide for the play adds Fishbein is "a highly respected literary agent who connects Hart with the producer Sam Harris, and his colleague, Max Siegel."
