= An Indecent Obsession =

An Indecent Obsession may refer to:

- An Indecent Obsession (novel), a 1981 novel by Colleen McCullough
- An Indecent Obsession (film), a 1985 Australian film based on the novel

== See also ==
- Indecent Obsession, an Australian pop rock band
