= The Gravy Train (TV series) =

British television series (1990)

- Genre: Comedy drama Satire
- Created by: Malcolm Bradbury
- Written by: Malcolm Bradbury
- Directed by: David Tucker
- Starring: Christoph Waltz; Ian Richardson; Almanta Suska; Alexei Sayle; Jacques Sereys; Anita Zagaria; Sabine Weber; Judy Parfitt; Geoffrey Hutchings; Ron Donachie; Amanda Mealing; André Maranne; Phillip Joseph; Julia Dearden
- Composer: John E. Keane
- Country of origin: United Kingdom
- Original language: English
- No. of series: 1
- No. of episodes: 4

Production
- Executive producers: Tom Donald; Victor Glynn
- Producers: Philip Hinchcliffe; Ian Warren
- Production locations: England, UK; Austria; Germany; Belgium
- Cinematography: Ken Westbury
- Editor: Robin Sales
- Running time: 52 minutes
- Production companies: Portman Productions in association with France 2 and ZDF

Original release
- Network: Channel 4
- Release: 27 June – 18 July 1990

Related
- The Gravy Train Goes East

The Gravy Train is a British satirical comedy-drama series written and created by Malcolm Bradbury and directed by David Tucker. The show starred Christoph Waltz and Ian Richardson. It was produced by Portman Productions in association with France 2 and ZDF for one series and four episodes and aired on Channel 4 between 27 June and 18 July 1990. It was followed by a sequel, The Gravy Train Goes East in 1991, the following year.

== Cast ==
- Christoph Waltz as Dr. Hans Joachim (Dorfmann)
- Ian Richardson as Michael Spearpoint
- Almanta Suska as Nadine
- Alexei Sayle as Milcic
- Jacques Sereys as Villeneuve
- Anita Zagaria as Gianna
- Sabine Weber as Christa
- Judy Parfitt as Hilda
- Geoffrey Hutchings as Gustave
- Ron Donachie as Hatted Man
- Amanda Mealing as Delise
- André Maranne as Maitre D'
- Phillip Joseph as Alexei
- Julia Dearden as Maria Theresa

== Episodes ==
No.	Title	Directed by	Written by	Original release date
1	"Episode 1"	David Tucker	Malcolm Bradbury	27 June 1990
Idealistic young Dorfmann's arrival in Brussels is met with a whirlwind of applause. It seems his reputation precedes him, much to his surprise. But it quickly becomes apparent that all is not quite as it seems: an attractive Italian journalist, however, takes a shine to his earnestness and promises to be his guide.
2	"Episode 2"	David Tucker	Malcom Bradbury	4 July 1990
Hans is deeply worried following Nadine's sudden disappearance, seemingly from the face of the Earth. Meanwhile Spearpoint is suddenly taking an interest in his suspected fraud discovery, but the relevant files vanish as completely as Nadine has. And then there are three train loads of rotting plums to deal with...
3	"Episode 3"	David Tucker	Malcom Bradbury	11 July 1990
Hans's journey to Bulgaria with the shipment of plums become increasingly strange. Being discovered half-way by Christa, she leads him in breaking into the trucks to see what their real cargo is. Once inside the Soviet bloc, Hans finds a government official keen to part millions of dollars - but his unwitting adventure has barely begun.
4	"Episode 4"	David Tucker	Malcom Bradbury	18 July 1990
The net closes in on Dorfmann as he hides out - with a little help from Nadine - in Salzburg. Both Milcic and the E.E.C. fraud squad are hot on his tail, however, whilst he struggles to determine who is really behind the massive fraud for which he is now blamed. Returning to Brussels with the $20,000,000 seems both as difficult as ever and his only option to clear his name.

== Production locations ==
The series was shot in Austria, Germany, Belgium, and in England at Pinewood Studios.

== Home media ==
The complete first series was released on DVD by Simply Media in two-disc set on 8 October 2018.
