= Eating People is Wrong =

1959 English novel by Malcolm Bradbury

- First edition (UK)
- Author: Malcolm Bradbury
- Cover artist: Donald Green
- Language: English
- Publisher: Secker & Warburg (UK); Knopf (US)
- Publication date: 1959
- Publication place: United Kingdom
- Media type: Print

Eating People is Wrong is the debut novel by English author Malcolm Bradbury first published in 1959.

== Plot introduction ==
Set in provincial academia (as were many of his novels which followed) forty-year-old professor Stuart Treece grew up in a bygone era of the 1930s but now finds it difficult to adapt to the changing attitudes of the 1950s. He then falls in love with post graduate Emma Fielding as he struggles to connect with her, agonising on his morals and his relationship to her. Also in love with Emma is an African Eborebelosa (who already has four wives) and adult working-class student Louis Bates, who is obsessed with her.

== Inspiration ==
In an unpublished afterword, Bradbury explains "Eating People Is Wrong was a novel I had worked on right through the Fifties – indeed from the moment, in 1950, when I went to a redbrick university, a first generation student, and looked in wonderment at what I saw ... If the central character, the 40-year old Stuart Treece, is based on anyone, it is simply a projection of my 20-year old self – though the last thing I intended, when I wrote the book, was to become a professor of literature like him, which either says a lot for the power of fantasy, or the ironic workings of fate." The title of the book comes from the chorus of the song "The Reluctant Cannibal" by Flanders and Swann from their LP "At the Drop of a Hat."

== Reception ==
- In 1960, Roger Pippett in The New York Times wrote that Malcolm Bradbury "has written a brilliant first novel. Here is a tragi-comedy which sometimes splutters in farce (when it seems like a parody of Lucky Jim) but at its best, fuses sensitivity and irony and becomes a significant social satire ... Moreover the author's flair for character and his recognition of the human predicament give the narrative a saving grace. Mr Bradbury certainly has a lethal wit; but with him, familiarity never breeds contempt. Philip Larkin 'couldn't help buying it, it seemed so funny' (Letter to Monica Jones 4th August, 1960).
- In 2015, Amit Mukerjee from IIT Kanpur wrote "A rambling novel about university life in provincial England – the title is perhaps the most memorable part of the book. Hailed as a comic novel, the story does not get too many laughs. some characters have strong comic elements – the African chief's son, Eborebelosa, who locks himself into lavatories and wishes to induce Emma Fielding to marry him by promising her "as many goats as she likes", and the dialogue is often scintillating – but the plot meanders and fails to keep interest and the comic elements are diluted by too much humdrum."
