= The Thorn Birds: The Missing Years =

1996 CBS television miniseries

- Based on: Characters from The Thorn Birds by Colleen McCullough
- Written by: David Stevens
- Directed by: Kevin James Dobson
- Starring: Richard Chamberlain; Amanda Donohoe; Julia Blake; Olivia Burnette; Zach English; Simon Westaway
- Countries of origin: United States; Australia
- Original language: English

Production
- Cinematography: Ross Berryman
- Running time: 178 minutes
- Production companies: The Wolper Organization; Village Roadshow Pictures Television; Warner Bros. Television

Original release
- Network: CBS
- Release: February 11, 1996

The Thorn Birds: The Missing Years is a 1996 CBS miniseries directed by Kevin James Dobson. Adapted from the 1977 novel The Thorn Birds by Colleen McCullough, it tells the story of the nineteen years between Dane's birth and Ralph's return to Australia. These years are unaccounted for in the original 1983 ABC miniseries. Unlike the original, which was filmed in California, The Missing Years was filmed entirely in Australia, and the Drogheda sheep ranch had to be rebuilt from scratch. Actor Richard Chamberlain was also the only previous cast member to return.

The Missing Years received mixed reviews from both critics and audiences, with praise directed at the sets and performances, but criticism directed at the plot and some inconsistencies with the original miniseries. However, star Richard Chamberlain was proud of his work on The Missing Years, stating: "It’s a terrific story. It’s full of intrigue. But the love story is classic, an absolute classic. Never have there been so many crucial barriers between the lovers."

== Plot ==
In 1942, ten years have passed since the birth of Dane, the illegitimate son of Catholic priest Father Ralph de Bricassart (Richard Chamberlain) and Meghann "Meggie" O'Neill (Amanda Donohoe). After leaving her husband, Luke O'Neill (Simon Westaway), Meggie has been forced to run Drogheda largely on her own, since all her brothers went off to fight in World War II. To make matters worse, a two-year drought has struck the area. One day, Luke, arrives on Drogheda and begs Meggie to forgive him. Meggie, lonely, in need of a man to run the ranch and to be a father for her children, reluctantly takes Luke back, and she becomes pregnant once again.

The series opens in Rome, where Father Ralph has been using his ministry as a haven for Jewish war refugees. With Allied bombs raining down, Ralph sends them into an underground bomb shelter, where he promises a dying man that he will take care of his grandson, whose parents had been killed by the Nazis. After Ralph uses some of Mary Carson's estate money to send the young orphan to America, the church "punishes" him by forcing him to return to Drogheda to guard the church's bequeathed property and to convince the Australian government to accept more refugees. Ralph arrives in Australia unannounced and Luke is not pleased to see him. Luke demands Meggie move with him immediately to a ramshackle cabin on the farm he purchased, just to get Meggie away from Ralph. When Meggie resists, Luke strikes her, causing her to miscarry.

Meggie decides she can never return to Luke, but Luke declares he only returned for Dane, whom he thinks is his son. Meggie takes Luke to court for custody of Dane. The judge, a Protestant biased against Dane's desire to be a priest, awards custody to Luke, with Meggie refusing to ruin Ralph by announcing Dane is his and not Luke's son. She decides to avoid scandal, confronting Ralph with the fact that he loves God more than her, that he will always be devoted to a greater good. She has raised her son without the knowledge of who his father is.

The rains finally come, and Ralph and Meggie do their best to round up the animals before the flood comes. Unable to make it back to Drogheda in the downpour, the two find refuge in a small cabin, where a night of romance ensues. Meggie's mother, Fee, in a last-ditch attempt to reclaim Dane, confronts Luke with the truth—Dane is not his son but the son of Father Ralph. Luke swears never to reveal this fact for fear of losing Meggie and his children to Ralph forever. Luke confronts Ralph and starts a fight, declaring if Ralph can beat him he can have Dane. Ralph defeats Luke, and torn and bleeding, Luke relents and allows Ralph to return Dane to Meggie. Ralph comforts Justine, who believes that nobody loves her, and then returns to Rome to continue helping the wartime refugees. As Ralph leaves on a train, he sees Meggie watching him go, and she mouths the words "I love you" to him.

== Cast ==
Starring

- Richard Chamberlain as Father Ralph de Bricassart
- Amanda Donohoe as Meggie Cleary O'Neill, replacing Rachel Ward
- Simon Westaway as Luke O'Neill, replacing Bryan Brown
- Julia Blake as Fee Cleary, replacing Jean Simmons
- Olivia Burnette as Justine O'Neill, replacing Mare Winningham
- Zach English as Dane O'Neill, replacing Philip Anglim
- Robert Taylor as Jack Cleary, replacing Stephan W. Burns

Special guest appearance by

- Jack Thompson as the Judge
- Maximilian Schell as Cardinal Vittorio, replacing Christopher Plummer

== Production ==
Producer David L. Wolper explained why this story was not included in the original 1983 The Thorn Birds miniseries: "there were so many hours that we could do for the original. We decided in the original that after he made love to Meggie that we would just cut ahead to the children." After reruns during the summer of 1993 proved popular Wolper decided there was an audience for more Thorn Birds. Actor Richard Chamberlain was the only actor to return for the prequel, but he turned down the original script, stating: "It was very good, but I don’t think it treated Father Ralph well enough, so I turned that down. I thought he wasn’t active enough in the story." When Chamberlain declined to reprise his role, ABC declined to produce the project, and it was greenlit by CBS instead. However, after being presented with another draft of the script that he liked better, Chamberlain agreed to reprise his role.

The miniseries was filmed entirely on location in Australia, unlike the original, which was filmed in California. According to Wolper, when they were making the original, he wanted to shoot it in Australia, but there weren't enough film crews to make that vision a reality. However, by the time The Missing Years was in development, the Australian film industry had become substantially more capable. Wolper stated: “Over the years, there have been many crews developed in Australia. We had an Australian director, so he knew the best crews down there.” The filmmakers went to painstaking lengths to completely rebuild the Drogheda set to make it look as accurate as possible to the original. The plans for the Drogheda mansion from the original miniseries had been lost and the set designer had since passed away. Richard Chamberlain claimed: "They had to re-create it from the film, which was very difficult. They did an extraordinary good job, I think." Principal photography began on July 24, 1995 and wrapped on September 19, 1995.

== Reception ==
Variety gave the miniseries a mixed review, stating that the set design was "first-rate", also praising the casting and stating that, although it would take a miracle to top the original, "the love story is still involving". The Deseret News was far more negative, calling it a travesty, writing that the story "not only pales in comparison to the original but often directly contradicts events in both the book and the first miniseries". One of the alleged inconsistencies mentioned in the review was that Father Ralph offers to leave the church and marry Meggie, something that he never implied in the original. Another was that Meggie's mother, Fee (played by Jean Simmons), goes from a quiet, irreligious woman to a religious, rapid-talking gossip-bearer. Despite the mixed reaction, Richard Chamberlain liked the miniseries, stating: "It was really exciting. It’s a wonderful story and a wonderful cast. I think it turned out really well."
