= John Dicks (actor) =

English actor

- Born: 23 July 1947 (age 77); England, UK

John Dicks (born 23 July 1947) is an English stage, film and television actor. His stage work includes appearances with the RSC, and in Andrew Lloyd Webber's flop musical Jeeves in London, 1975, in which he also sang on the rare recording. His film appearances include The Empire Strikes Back (1980), The First Kangaroos (1988), Flirting (1991), Return to the Blue Lagoon (1991) and Queen of the Damned (2002).

== Filmography ==
Year	Title	Role	Notes
1975	Flame	Lenny	
1975	Three Men in a Boat	Launch Owner	TV movie
1980	The Empire Strikes Back	Captain Lennox (Imperial Officer)	
1982–1983	Marco Polo	Brother Philip	TV Mini-Series, 3 episodes
1982	Give Us This Day	Mr. Sykes	
1985	Hitler's S.S.: Portrait in Evil	Lutze	TV movie
1988	The First Kangaroos	Reverend Green	
1991	Flirting	Rev. Consti Nicholson	
1991	Return to the Blue Lagoon	Penfield	
1991	The Gravy Train Goes East	Larson Parson	TV Series, 4 episodes
1996	Mercury	Speaker	TV Series
2002	Queen of the Damned	Talamascan	(final film role)
