= The Touch (McCullough novel) =

2003 historical novel by Colleen McCullough

- First UK edition
- Author: Colleen McCullough
- Language: English
- Genre: Historical novel
- Publisher: Century (UK); Simon & Schuster (US)
- Publication date: November 2003
- Publication place: Australia
- Media type: Print (Hardback & Paperback)
- Pages: 464 pp
- ISBN: 0-684-85330-2
- OCLC: 53423384
- Dewey Decimal: 823/.914 22
- LC Class: PR9619.3.M32 T68 2003b

The Touch is a historical novel by Colleen McCullough published in 2003. It is about the life of a Scotswoman, Elizabeth Drummond, who travels from her home in Kinross, Scotland to New South Wales in order to marry her wealthy cousin, Alexander Kinross. The story takes place over the latter half of the 19th century.

== Reception ==
In the Historical Novels Review, Andrea Connel called it, "a compelling new perspective on the romantic theme of the mail-order bride" but went on to say that it was cold and impersonal, ultimately not enjoying the book. Publishers Weekly wrote that the plot was complex, but the characters won sympathy through honor. Kirkus Reviews put it simply, "a colorful tale about colorful characters in colorful places and times." Meanwhile, for Booklist, Patty Engelmann praised it as "a fantastic and exceptional saga about the lively personalities and explosive situations that shaped Australia."
