= Morgan's Run =

2000 novel by Colleen McCullough

- First UK edition
- Author: Colleen McCullough
- Language: English
- Genre: Historical novel
- Publisher: Century (UK); Simon & Schuster (US)
- Publication date: 31 August 2000
- Publication place: Australia
- Media type: Print (hardback & paperback)
- ISBN: 0-7126-8046-2
- OCLC: 44533284

Morgan's Run The Musical
- Music: Gavin Lockley
- Lyrics: Gavin Lockley
- Book: Colleen McCullough
- Basis: Morgan's Run the book based on the voyage of the First Fleet and colonisation of Australia.
- Productions: 2011 Springwood Civic Centre

Morgan's Run is a historical novel by Colleen McCullough published in 2000.

== Synopsis ==
The novel follows the life of an English prisoner shipped to the first penal colonies in Australia in the 18th century. Much of the novel is set in the penal colony on Norfolk Island. It starts off with the prisoner's life in Bristol, England and describes in detail his survival of the transportation on a prison ship to Norfolk Island and how he dared to hope in the hard life of a convict.

== The musical ==
The book has been adapted into a musical by Colleen McCullough and composer Gavin Lockley The musical's debut was over 8 shows in the Springwood Civic Centre by the Blue Mountains Musical Society with a cast of 32, a small classical orchestra, a harpsichord, and a rock drum kit.

Gavin Lockley worked closely with Colleen McCullough and spent most of 2010 on Norfolk Island, the penal colony to which the musical's main character Richard Morgan was sent. Lockley's previous works including The Symphony of Australia and Ballads of the Bush have sought to express the history and essence of the nation and create a distinctive national musical heritage. Whilst Ballads of the Bush sets popular Australian verse to music, and the Symphony of Australia celebrates a nation, Morgan's Run is a narrative about the founding of a nation and its character.
