= The Ladies of Missalonghi =

Novel by Colleen McCullough

- First UK edition
- Author: Colleen McCullough
- Language: English
- Genre: Fiction
- Publication date: 1987
- Media type: Print (Hardback and Paperback)

The Ladies of Missalonghi is a short novel by Australian writer Colleen McCullough commissioned for the Hutchinson Novellas series and published in the United States in the Harper Short Novel series in 1987. Set in the small town of Byron in the Blue Mountains of Australia in the years just before World War I, the novel is the story of Missy Wright and the Hurlingford family.

== Plot summary ==
In the years before World War I in Byron, Australia, the males of the Hurlingford family hold all the power and money. Those Hurlingford women without a man due to spinsterhood or widowhood lead cramped lives of hard work and little money on scraps of land or in businesses that just barely support them.

Thirty-something spinster Missy Wright leads a narrow existence on the wrong side of the tracks with her widowed mother Drusilla Hurlingford Wright and crippled aunt Octavia when Byron is consumed by two events, the upcoming wedding of Missy's beautiful cousin Alicia Marshall to William Hurlingford, and the arrival of a rough looking stranger named John Smith.

With limited funds and suffering bouts of ill health, Missy's only consolation is her trips to the lending library where her distant cousin Una Hurlingford works. Una, a society beauty, has returned to Byron after a glamorous life in Sydney. Under Una's tutelage and encouraged by the romantic novels she sneaks home, Missy begins to dream of the world outside Byron and a better life for herself.

Bolstered by a confrontation with her cousin Alicia and a trip to a Sydney doctor, Missy breaks free of her Byron shackles, finds financial independence for her older female Hurlingford relations, and ends up the happy bride of mysterious John Smith.

== Art ==
The book had a full wrap-around cover art and interior illustrations by Peter Chapman.

== Allegations of plagiarism ==
The book closely resembles The Blue Castle, a 1926 novel by L.M. Montgomery, best known as the author of Anne of Green Gables. The plot and character details are nearly identical, and "other resemblances seem particularly telling simply because they are so minor." Gillian Whitlock and Mary Jean DeMarr have described the history of the allegations of plagiarism, and McCullough's defence of subconscious recollection.

== Bibliography ==
- The Ladies of Missalonghi (London & Melbourne: Hutchinson, 1987) ISBN 0-09-170600-9 First edition
- The Ladies of Missalonghi (New York, NY: Harper & Row, 1987) ISBN 0-06-015739-9 First US edition
- Les dames de Missalonghi (Paris: Pierre Belfond, 1987) ISBN 2-7144-1998-4 First French edition. Translated by Marianne Véron
- The Ladies of Missalonghi (London: Random House, 1987) ISBN 0-09-953640-4 First paperback edition
