= Cuts (novel) =

1987 novel by Malcolm Bradbury

- First edition
- Author: Malcolm Bradbury
- Language: English
- Genre: novel
- Publisher: Hutchinson (UK); Harper & Row (US)
- Publication date: 1987
- Publication place: United Kingdom
- Media type: Print
- Pages: 96
- ISBN: 0-09-168280-0

Cuts was written by author Malcolm Bradbury, commissioned by Hutchinson as part of their Hutchinson Novella series, published in 1987. It used a host of plays on the word "cuts" to mock the values of Thatcherite Britain in 1986 and the world of television drama production in which Bradbury had become involved after the adaptation of The History Man (by Christopher Hampton). Bradbury derided the philistinism of television executives who wanted to capture the market of Brideshead Revisited and The Jewel in the Crown at impossibly low cost. He also explored the low esteem accorded writers in the hierarchy of television production.

== Inspiration ==
Two years ago he was working on the dramatization of one of his novels, about an imaginary socialist state, for the BBC; 80 actors were taught an imaginary language, locations were scouted in Turkey, rehearsals started. Two days before shooting, the series was abandoned. Suddenly the BBC didn't have any money, Mr. Bradbury said.

== Plot ==
In the summer of 1986 government funds are being cut, and services are reducing, including education, health, the arts. Obscure university teacher and post-modernist novelist Henry Babbacombe was losing his staff while northern, hapless 'Eldorado Television' approaches him to produce a blockbuster of a series to be called Serious Damage. Henry is thrust into the media spotlight where he is forced to cut, edit and rewrite the series. Eventually the production is axed, much to his relief. Henry manages what it takes to be a success in Margaret Thatcher's Britain.

== Reception ==
- Charles Nicholl in London Review of Books is mostly positive: Cuts is slim and slight – intentionally so, in this era of ‘cuts’: another joke or meta-joke. It is a contemporary comedy of humours, written with panache and wit. Perhaps it is churlish of me to wish it was something more, but I do. In a wider context I am indeed being churlish, or at least nit-picking and mote-spying, for when one considers the thousands of books published each month, Bradbury's offering, however slim, shines like a good deed in a naughty world...I shall remember to go down on my knees in thanks that someone as complex and humane as Bradbury is also accessible and amusing enough to be ‘commercial’, and has filled some small cranny with intelligence, amid the glossy tundra of vapidity that is the contemporary book industry.
- Lorrie Moore in The New York Times also generally praises the novella: " What he has given us in Cuts is once more a depiction of man as historical performer, this time in a satirical romp through Thatcher England. It was a time for getting rid of the old soft illusions, and replacing them with the new hard illusions. Mr. Bradbury has milked his title for all it is worth, and it is worth much. If he has left us feeling a bit severed at the end, it may have been one cut too many, but we get the authorial joke. There is so much fun, fury and intelligence in this little novel, one can forgive its insistent cartoonishness or those rare moments when the wit is less rapier than spoon."

== Adaptation ==
In 1996 an adaption appeared on Yorkshire Television, and starred Peter Davison, Timothy West, Donald Sinden, Nigel Planer and Pippa Haywood.
