= Tim (novel) =

Novel by Colleen McCullough

First edition (publ. Harper & Row)

Tim is a novel by Australian writer Colleen McCullough, published by Harper and Row in 1974. Her literary agent was Frieda Fishbein.

It portrays the story of the developing relationship between an older, middle-class woman, Mary Horton, who lives on her own and a handsome, developmentally impaired 24-year-old gardener, Tim Melville, whom she hires. It inspired the 1979 film of the same name, starring Piper Laurie and Mel Gibson and the 1996 television film Mary & Tim starring Candice Bergen and Tom McCarthy.
