= Tim (film) =

- Theatrical release poster
- Directed by: Michael Pate
- Written by: Michael Pate
- Based on: Tim by Colleen McCullough
- Produced by: Michael Pate
- Starring: Piper Laurie; Mel Gibson; Alwyn Kurts; Pat Evison; Deborah Kennedy
- Cinematography: Paul Onorato
- Edited by: David Stiven
- Music by: Eric Jupp
- Production companies: Pisces Production; Australian Film Commission; Nine Network
- Distributed by: Greater Union Film Distributors
- Release date: 13 July 1979
- Running time: 109 minutes
- Country: Australia
- Language: English
- Budget: A$600,000
- Box office: A$809,000 (Australia)

Tim is a 1979 Australian romantic drama film written, produced and directed by Michael Pate in his directorial debut. It stars Piper Laurie, Mel Gibson, Alwyn Kurts, Pat Evison, and Deborah Kennedy, and is based on the 1974 novel of the same name by Colleen McCullough.

== Plot ==
Tim depicts a developing relationship between Mary Horton, an independent older, educated and wealthy American woman, and Tim Melville, a handsome, developmentally impaired 24-year-old builder's labourer, whom she hires. Tim lives with his sister, Dawnie, who is a year older than he is, and their parents Ron and Emily. Dawnie marries her boyfriend, Mick Harrington. Dawnie and Mick make clear they dislike Mary and oppose her relationship with Tim, but do not state their reason for their feeling. Tim eventually marries Mary.

== Cast ==
- Piper Laurie as Mary Horton
- Mel Gibson as Tim Melville
- Alwyn Kurts as Ron Melville
- Pat Evison as Em Melville
- Peter Gwynne as Tom Ainsley
- Deborah Kennedy as Dawnie Melville
- David Foster as Mick Harrington
- Michael Caulfield as John Martinson
- Margo Lee as Mrs. Harrington
- James Condon as Mr. Harrington
- Ray Barrett as Man outside hotel (uncredited)

== Production ==
Michael Pate first read the book in 1975 and was immediately taken by it. He optioned the screen rights to the book, wrote the screenplay, and decided to direct.

Pate wanted the female lead played by an international actor and spoke with Deborah Kerr, Jean Simmons and Glenda Jackson. Jackson was interested but was not available until 1982 so Piper Laurie was cast instead. Funding came from the Australian Film Commission, the NSW Film Corporation, Greater Union and Channel Nine. Filming took six weeks in August and September 1978. Locations used include Palm Beach.

== Release ==
Tim had its premiere on 13 July 1979 at GUO's Russell Cinemas, Melbourne and was released in Sydney on 21 September 1979. In an interview with the Sun-Herald on 20 September 1979, Pate said that the film had run for 12 weeks in Sydney. On 1 April 1979, the Australian Classification Board announced that the film would receive a PG certificate rating. The film was originally released in the U.S. on 17 September 1981.

=== Home media ===
The film was available in many markets, originally released on VHS and on DVD. When released on home media in 1984, it was given a PG classification. It was first released in Australia on DVD in 2003 by Magna Pacific with an extra feature of an eighteen-minute interview with the director. A 30th Anniversary Edition DVD was released in the United States in 2009 by Peace Arch Trinity. In May 2011, Germany released it on Blu-ray Disc with little bonus material.

== Reception ==
The film was Gibson's third movie role, and was moderately successful in Australia, earning Gibson an award at the 21st Australian Film Institute Awards for Best Actor. Kurts and Evison also won Best Supporting Actor and Actress awards respectively.

=== Box office ===
Tim grossed $809,000 at the box office in Australia.

=== Critical response ===
William Thomas of Empire gave Tim 4 out of 5 stars, praising Gibson's effort: "Gibson sensitively portrays Tim without resorting to the usual facial tics associated with this type of role, and, even when a romance begins to develop between the pair, the film rarely slides into cliché." Vincent Canby of The New York Times gave it a mixed review saying "Tim is the sort of movie that poses a question not likely to be raised by anyone you know: Can a beautiful, 40-ish woman, who is successful in business and remarkably stable in her emotional life, find happiness with a handsome young man, approximately half her age, who hasn't - as he puts it - a full quid?" He summed up the film with "Considering the patent sillinesses of the material, Miss Laurie and Mr. Gibson do very well, and the supporting performers, especially Mr. Kurts, are fine."

=== Accolades ===
Award	Date of ceremony	Category	Recipient(s) and nominee(s)	Result	Ref(s)
AACTA Awards	1979	Best Actor in a Leading Role	Mel Gibson	Won	
AACTA Awards	1979	Best Actress in a Supporting Role	Pat Evison	Won	
AACTA Awards	1979	Best Actor in a Supporting Role	Alywn Kurts	Won	
AWGIE Awards	1981	Best screenplay	Michael Pate	Won	

== Remake ==
The film was remade for American television as Mary & Tim in 1996, starring Candice Bergen and Tom McCarthy in the lead roles.

== See also ==
- Cinema of Australia
- Tim (novel)
