= The Thorn Birds Musical =

Musical

The Thorn Birds is a 2009 musical adaptation of the 1977 novel of the same name by Colleen McCullough. The lyrics were written by McCullough herself, the music was composed by Gloria Bruni and it was directed by Michael Bogdanov behind Wales Theatre Company.

It starred Matthew Goodgame as Father Ralph de Bricassart, Helen Anker as Meggie Cleary and Peter Karrie as Cardinal di Conti-Verchese. The cast included Andrea Miller, Kieran Brown, Ieuan Rhys, Phylip Harries, Richard Munday and Llinos Daniel.

The UK tour features visits to Poole, Swansea, Wolverhampton, Aberystwyth, Bradford, Hull, Llandudno, Windsor, Plymouth, Malvern, Birmingham and then finishing in the Wales Millennium Centre, Cardiff in July.
