= Beautiful and Damned =

Beautiful and Damned (Zelda Fitzgerald Musical)
- Original poster
- Music: Les Reed; Roger Cook
- Lyrics: Les Reed; Roger Cook
- Book: Kit Hesketh Harvey
- Basis: F. Scott Fitzgerald's novel The Beautiful and Damned
- Productions: 2004 West End 2023 Maryland

Beautiful and Damned is a musical with a book by Kit Hesketh Harvey and music and lyrics by Les Reed and Roger Cook.

Drawing its title from F. Scott Fitzgerald's second novel, it focuses on the turbulent relationship he shared with his wife Zelda during the Jazz Age. Young, stylish, and successful, they are the envy of high society friends who are unaware that behind their glamorous façade are two individuals doomed to tragedy.

== Productions ==
The musical premiered in Guildford at the Yvonne Arnaud Theatre in June 2003, with John Barrowman and Helen Anker.

The West End production opened on 28 April 2004 (previews) at the Lyric Theatre, where it ran until 14 August. Directed and choreographed by Craig Revel Horwood, the cast included Michael Praed (Scott), Helen Anker (Zelda), Jo Gibb, Susannah Fellows, and David Burt.

A new production, helmed by Baltimore-based designer Sammy Robert Jungwirth, will be produced under the new title, “Zelda” in Maryland in 2023 through special arrangement with the show’s global rights owner www.Lucky4music.com.

== Song list ==
- I'm Dancing
- I'll Meet You at the Ball Tonight
- Beautiful Magnolia
- I Refuse to Be a Girl
- Little Miz Alabama
- Tomorrow Won't Happen 'til Tomorrow
- Casey's Grill/Shooter's Shoes
- The Letters
- The Beautiful and the Damned
- So Long New York to Europe
- Living Well's the Only Way
- The Old World Shines Again
- Trouble
- She's Over the Top - He's Under the Table
- Golden Days
- Princess of the Western World
- Oh How Tender is the Night
- Save Me the Waltz
- Being a Woman
- Even Now
