= An Indecent Obsession (novel) =

1981 novel by Colleen McCullough

First edition cover (publ. Harper & Row)

An Indecent Obsession is a 1981 novel by Australian author Colleen McCullough. A film adaptation of the same name, directed by Lex Marinos, was made in 1985.

== Summary ==
During the final years of World War II, nurse Honour Langry cares for psychologically scarred Australian soldiers at a military hospital in rural Australia. Honour becomes emotionally drawn to Michael Wilson, a decorated serviceman transferred to the ward under mysterious circumstances. As Michael struggles with trauma, secrecy, and social stigma, tensions within the hospital begin to rise. Honour's growing attachment to him disrupts the fragile balance among the patients and staff, leading to jealousy, emotional conflict, and an act of violence that changes the lives of everyone involved.
