= Helen Anker =

British actress, singer, and dancer

- Born: 1972 (age 53–54); Banbury, Oxfordshire, England
- Education: Royal Ballet School; Bird College
- Occupations: Actress; Singer; Dancer
- Years active: 1981–present
- Website: www.helenanker.com

Helen Anker (born 1972) is an English actress, singer, and dancer who trained at the Royal Ballet School and Bird College. She has appeared in numerous London West End and Broadway musicals and plays, perhaps best known for originating the role of Zelda Fitzgerald in Beautiful and Damned.

== Early life ==
Anker's first professional role was in 1981, when she was only nine years old, playing Louisa in The Sound of Music with Petula Clark and Honor Blackman at London's Apollo Victoria Theatre. Following this debut, she trained for five years at the Royal Ballet School before transferring to Bird College to pursue her passion for musical theatre.

== Career ==
Anker's theatrical career resumed after finishing three years at Bird College, beginning in London's West End. She performed in Radio Times at Queen's Theatre in London, as Vera and cover Patsy in Crazy For You at the Prince Edward Theatre, as Victoria the White Cat, Jemima and Demeter in Cats at the New London Theatre, as Thelma Furness in Always at the Victoria Palace Theatre, as Louisa Gradgrind in Hard Times at the Theatre Royal Haymarket, and as Aggie and cover Laurey in Oklahoma! at the National Theatre, which was also filmed for Sky television.

Anker was cast in the leading role of Zelda Fitzgerald in Beautiful and Damned, a musical named after F. Scott Fitzgerald's second novel, where she portrayed the turbulent and tragic life of a wife, lover, and literary muse during the Roaring Twenties. She originally played Zelda at The Yvonne Arnaud Theatre in Guildford, and again when the production moved to London's Lyric Theatre. Additional West End roles for Anker include Iris in Fame at The Cambridge Theatre, Mrs Phagan and Sally Slaton in Parade at Donmar Warehouse, Girl on the Swing in Contact at Queen's Theatre, Ivy Smith in On the Town at the Coliseum, English National Opera. She also appeared in Candide at the Coliseum.

Anker also performed in many regional productions and UK tours, including Judy Turner in A Chorus Line at the Crucible Theatre in Sheffield, Mary Bailey in It's a Wonderful Life at The New Wolsey Theatre in Ipswich, Meggie Cleary in the first UK Tour of The Thorn Birds, Ruby in Dames at Sea at Eastbourne and on tour, Masterpieces – A Noel Coward Revue, and Let's Face the Music and Dance in Salisbury.

Crossing the Atlantic in 2010, Anker performed on Broadway in her first role in the US, as Miss Olson in Promises, Promises at The Broadway Theatre. She played the triple roles of Annabella, Pamela, and Margaret in The 39 Steps at Milwaukee Rep, and Georgia in Curtains at Paper Mill Playhouse. In the theatrical debut of Newsies in 2011, also at Paper Mill Playhouse, Anker originated the role of Medda Larkin. She continued to embrace a variety of unique and challenging roles throughout the United States: Beth/Paula in The Full Catastrophe for C.A.T.F, Eliza Doolittle in The Guthrie Theater's production of My Fair Lady, Mrs Mullins in Carousel with The Houston Grand Opera and Guenevere in Camelot at The Chanhassen Dinner Theatres in Minneapolis. She was also performed dances in the opening numbers at several Tony and Academy Awards ceremonies.

Anker returned to London in 2017, where she portrayed Hesione in Heartbreak House at the Union Theatre, London, and sang in the Carpenter's tribute show Rainy Days & Mondays at London Theatre Workshop.

Anker performed the role of Tanya in the 2018–2022 UK & International Tour of Mamma Mia!

Anker is now performing the role of Cynthia Murphy in the UK Tour of Dear Evan Hansen.

== Television and film ==
Anker's television and film appearances include Holby City for the BBC, White Collar, Law and Order, The Good Wife, Peter Pan Live!, Oklahoma!, Ted 2, and Disney's Cinderella (2015).
