= The Thorn Birds (miniseries) =

1983 American television miniseries

- DVD cover
- Genre: Drama; Romance
- Based on: The Thorn Birds by Colleen McCullough
- Written by: Carmen Culver; Lee Stanley
- Directed by: Daryl Duke
- Starring: Richard Chamberlain; Rachel Ward; Barbara Stanwyck; Christopher Plummer; Jean Simmons; Bryan Brown; Philip Anglim; Richard Kiley; Piper Laurie
- Theme music composer: Henry Mancini
- Country of origin: United States
- Original language: English
- No. of episodes: 4

Production
- Executive producers: Edward Lewis; David L. Wolper
- Producer: Stan Margulies
- Production locations: William Andrews Clark Memorial Library; Big Sky Ranch; Kauaʻi; Los Angeles City Hall; Warner Brothers Burbank Studios
- Cinematography: Bill Butler
- Editors: Robert F. Shugrue; David Saxon; Carroll Timothy O'Meara
- Running time: 467 minutes
- Production companies: David Wolper–Stan Margulies Productions; Edward Lewis Productions; Warner Bros. Television

Original release
- Network: ABC
- Release: March 27 – March 30, 1983

Related
- The Thorn Birds: The Missing Years (1996)

The Thorn Birds is an Australian romantic drama television miniseries, broadcast on ABC from March 27 to 30, 1983. It starred Richard Chamberlain, Rachel Ward, Barbara Stanwyck, Christopher Plummer, Piper Laurie, Jean Simmons, Richard Kiley, Bryan Brown, Mare Winningham and Philip Anglim. It was directed by Daryl Duke and based on the best-selling 1977 novel of the same name by Colleen McCullough.

The series was enormously successful, being the second most widely watched television miniseries in history at the time, behind Roots. The Thorn Birds scored a staggering 41.9 rating and 59 percent of the audience, and was nominated for sixteen Emmys, winning six. It was followed by a sequel miniseries in 1996, The Thorn Birds: The Missing Years, showing some of what the characters experienced during the nineteen-year time gap in the original.

== Plot ==
The series centres on the lives of the Cleary family from the 1920s until the 1960s, who are brought from New Zealand to the Australian outback to help run the ranch of their aunt Mary Carson, and the forbidden love between Meggie Cleary and the family's priest, Father Ralph de Bricassart.

== Cast ==
Actor	Role
Starring
Richard Chamberlain	Father Ralph de Bricassart
Rachel Ward	Meghan "Meggie" Cleary
Jean Simmons	Fiona "Fee" Cleary
Ken Howard	Rainer Hartheim
Mare Winningham	Justine "Jussy" O'Neill
Piper Laurie	Anne Mueller
Richard Kiley	Padraic "Paddy" Cleary
Earl Holliman	Luddie Mueller
Bryan Brown	Luke O'Neill
Philip Anglim	Dane O'Neill
Special guest appearance
Christopher Plummer	Archbishop Vittorio di Contini-Verchese
Barbara Stanwyck	Mary Carson
Also starring
John Friedrich	Frank Cleary
Allyn Ann McLerie	Mrs. Smith
Richard Venture	Harry Gough
Stephanie Faracy	Judy Sutton
Barry Corbin	Pete
Sydney Penny	Young Meggie Cleary
Stephan Burns	Jack Cleary
Brett Cullen	Bob Cleary
Co-starring
Antoinette Bower	Sarah MacQueen
Dwier Brown	Stuart "Stuie" Cleary
John de Lancie	Alastair MacQueen
Bill Morey	Angus MacQueen
Vidal Peterson	Young Stuie Cleary
Holly Palance	Miss Carmichael
Meg Wyllie	Annie
Wally Dalton	Fair Barker
Nan Martin	Sister Agatha
Chard Hayward	Arne Swenson
Rance Howard	Doc Wilson
Lucinda Dooling	Martha
Aspa Nakopolou	Phaedre

== Development ==
The novel was originally developed as a feature film with Ed Lewis attached to produce. Ivan Moffat wrote an early draft of the script. Herbert Ross was the first director, and he saw Christopher Reeve about playing the lead. Then Peter Weir became attached to direct; Robert Redford was the favourite to play the lead. Weir dropped out and Arthur Hiller was going to direct; Ryan O'Neal was mooted as a star. Eventually it was decided to turn it into a mini series.

The role of Meggie Cleary became the most sought after role of the production, and was considered the role of a lifetime. Many actresses campaigned and auditioned for the role over a long period of pre-production. British actress Lynne Frederick was one of many actresses who heavily campaigned for the role. Frederick even dyed her hair red to showcase herself. Other actresses who auditioned for the part included Michelle Pfeiffer, Jane Seymour, Olivia Newton-John, and Kim Basinger.

== Awards and nominations ==
Year	Award	Category	Nominee(s)	Result	Ref.
1983	Primetime Emmy Awards	Outstanding Limited Series	David L. Wolper, Edward Lewis, and Stan Margulies	Nominated	
1983	Primetime Emmy Awards	Outstanding Lead Actor in a Limited Series or a Special	Richard Chamberlain	Nominated	
1983	Primetime Emmy Awards	Outstanding Lead Actress in a Limited Series or a Special	Barbara Stanwyck (for "Part I")	Won	
1983	Primetime Emmy Awards	Outstanding Supporting Actor in a Limited Series or a Special	Bryan Brown	Nominated	
1983	Primetime Emmy Awards	Outstanding Supporting Actor in a Limited Series or a Special	Richard Kiley (for "Part I")	Won	
1983	Primetime Emmy Awards	Outstanding Supporting Actor in a Limited Series or a Special	Christopher Plummer	Nominated	
1983	Primetime Emmy Awards	Outstanding Supporting Actress in a Limited Series or a Special	Piper Laurie	Nominated	
1983	Primetime Emmy Awards	Outstanding Supporting Actress in a Limited Series or a Special	Jean Simmons	Won	
1983	Primetime Emmy Awards	Outstanding Directing for a Limited Series or a Special	Daryl Duke (for "Part II")	Nominated	
1983	Primetime Emmy Awards	Outstanding Art Direction for a Limited Series or a Special	Robert MacKichan and Jerry Adams (for "Part I")	Won	
1983	Primetime Emmy Awards	Outstanding Cinematography for a Limited Series or a Special	Bill Butler (for "Part I")	Nominated	
1983	Primetime Emmy Awards	Outstanding Costumes for a Limited Series or a Special	William Travilla	Nominated	
1983	Primetime Emmy Awards	Outstanding Film Editing for a Limited Series or a Special	Carroll Timothy O'Meara (for "Part III")	Won	
1983	Primetime Emmy Awards	Outstanding Film Editing for a Limited Series or a Special	Robert F. Shugrue (for "Part I")	Nominated	
1983	Primetime Emmy Awards	Outstanding Achievement in Makeup	Del Acevedo (for "Part IV")	Won	
1983	Primetime Emmy Awards	Outstanding Achievement in Music Composition for a Limited Series or a Special (Dramatic Underscore)	Henry Mancini (for "Part I")	Nominated	
1984	American Cinema Editors Awards	Best Edited Episode for a Television Miniseries	Carroll Timothy O'Meara (for "Part III")	Nominated	
1984	American Cinema Editors Awards	Best Edited Episode for a Television Miniseries	Robert F. Shugrue (for "Part I")	Won	
1984	Directors Guild of America Awards	Outstanding Directorial Achievement in Movies for Television or Miniseries	Daryl Duke	Nominated	
1984	Golden Globe Awards	Best Miniseries or Motion Picture Made for Television		Won	
1984	Golden Globe Awards	Best Actor in a Miniseries or Motion Picture Made for Television	Richard Chamberlain	Won	
1984	Golden Globe Awards	Best Actress in a Miniseries or Motion Picture Made for Television	Rachel Ward	Nominated	
1984	Golden Globe Awards	Best Supporting Actor in a Series, Miniseries or Motion Picture Made for Television	Bryan Brown	Nominated	
1984	Golden Globe Awards	Best Supporting Actor in a Series, Miniseries or Motion Picture Made for Television	Richard Kiley	Won	
1984	Golden Globe Awards	Best Supporting Actress in a Series, Miniseries or Motion Picture Made for Television	Piper Laurie	Nominated	
1984	Golden Globe Awards	Best Supporting Actress in a Series, Miniseries or Motion Picture Made for Television	Jean Simmons	Nominated	
1984	Golden Globe Awards	Best Supporting Actress in a Series, Miniseries or Motion Picture Made for Television	Barbara Stanwyck	Won	
1984	People's Choice Awards	Best TV Miniseries		Won	
1984	Young Artist Awards	Best Young Actress in a Movie Made for Television	Sydney Penny	Won	
1998	Online Film & Television Association Awards	Television Hall of Fame: Productions		Inducted	
2007	TV Land Awards	Miniseries You Didn't Miss a Moment Of		Nominated	

== Home media ==
The Thorn Birds was released on VHS in 1991 in the US and Canada; it was re-released on DVD in the US and Canada on February 3, 2004. Both editions were given a "Not Rated" certification. It is rated PG in New Zealand for violence, sexual references, coarse language and nudity.

== Sequel ==
A follow-up titled The Thorn Birds: The Missing Years was broadcast by CBS in 1996. It tells the story of the 19 years unaccounted for in the original miniseries.
