= Anita Zagaria =

Italian actress

- Born: 27 June 1954 (age 71); Naples, Italy
- Occupation: Actress
- Years active: 1982-present

Anita Zagaria (born 27 June 1954) is an Italian actress. She has appeared in more than eighty films and TV series since 1982.

== Selected filmography ==
Film
Year	Title	Role	Notes
1985	Zone Troopers	Dream Girl	
1986	The Professor	Anna	
1987	Man on Fire	Conti's Wife	
1989	Queen of Hearts	Rosa	
1993	Flight of the Innocent	Mother of Vito	
1995	La scuola	Mrs. Gana	
1998	The Legend of 1900	Unknown Role	
2001	Unfair Competition	Margherita Melchiori	
2003	Break Free	Paola	
2003	Under the Tuscan Sun	Fiorella	
2006	Notte prima degli esami	Massi's Mother	
2009	La fisica dell'acqua	Infermiera	

TV
Year	Title	Role	Notes
1998	Un medico in famiglia	Nilde Martini	
2000	Padre Pio: Miracle Man	Mamma Peppa, Pio's Mother	
2006	Butta la luna	Elena Marini	
2020	The Flight Attendant	Enrico's Nonna	Episode 8
