= Jacques Sereys =

French actor and theatre director (1928–2023)

- Born: 2 June 1928; Saint-Maurice, Val-de-Marne, France
- Died: 1 January 2023 (aged 94)
- Education: Conservatoire national supérieur d'art dramatique
- Occupations: Actor; Theatre director
- Years active: 1952–2016

Jacques Sereys (2 June 1928 – 1 January 2023) was a French actor and theatre director.

== Biography ==
Raised by a single mother who worked as an embroiderer, Sereys grew up in Marseille. He began to make money at the age of 14 while working for Crédit Lyonnais. In 1951, he was admitted to the Conservatoire national supérieur d'art dramatique and attended classes taught by Henri Rollan. He joined the Comédie-Française in 1955, first as an associate before becoming a sociétaire in 1959.

In 1964, Sereys left the Comédie-Française to devote himself to boulevard theatre, a period in which he met the likes of Jacques Charon and Robert Hirsch. However, he returned to the Comédie-Française in 1977 and regained his membership in 1979. He retired in 1997 and became a de facto honorary sociétaire. He regularly continued to perform at the Comédie-Française until 2014.

=== Personal life and death ===
Sereys married actress Philippine Pascal, the stage name of Philippine de Rothschild, with whom he had two children: Camille (born 1961) and Philippe (born 1963). The couple divorced on 25 October 1999. Their children became the owners of Château Mouton Rothschild, Château d'Armailhac, and Château Clerc Milon.

Sereys died on 1 January 2023, at the age of 94.

== Filmography ==
- Molière (1956)
- Midnight Folly (1962)
- The Fire Within (1963)
- La Chamade (1968)
- A Season in Hell (1971)
- Murmur of the Heart (1971)
- Le Gang (1977)
- The Savage State (1977)
- A Simple Story (1978)
- I as in Icarus (1979)
- T'inquiète pas, ça se soigne (1980)
- Le Bon Plaisir (1984)
- L'Addition (1984)
- La Galette du roi (1986)
- La Petite Amie (1988)
- Le Bal du gouverneur (1990)
- L'Opération Corned-Beef (1991)
- The Horseman on the Roof (1995)
- Kings for a Day (1997)
- On Guard (1997)
- Chouchou (2003)
- Towards Zero (2007)
- Disco (2008)
