= Malcolm Bradbury =

English author and academic (1932–2000)

Sir Malcolm Bradbury CBE
- Born: Malcolm Stanley Bradbury; 7 September 1932; Sheffield, West Riding of Yorkshire, England
- Died: 27 November 2000 (aged 68); Norwich, Norfolk, England
- Education: University of Leicester (BA); Queen Mary College, University of London (MA); Victoria University of Manchester (PhD)
- Occupations: Author and academic
- Years active: 1955–2000
- Spouse: Elizabeth Salt
- Children: 2
- Website: www.malcolmbradbury.com

Sir Malcolm Stanley Bradbury, CBE (7 September 1932 – 27 November 2000) was an English author and academic.

== Life ==
Bradbury was born in Sheffield, the son of a railwayman. His family moved to London in 1935, but returned to Sheffield in 1941 with his brother and mother. The family later moved to Nottingham and in 1943 Bradbury attended West Bridgford Grammar School, where he remained until 1950. He read English at University College, Leicester, gaining a first-class degree in 1953. He continued his studies at Queen Mary College, University of London, where he gained his MA in 1955.

Between 1955 and 1958, Bradbury moved between teaching posts with the University of Manchester and Indiana University in the United States. He returned to England in 1958 for a major heart operation; such was his heart condition that he was not expected to live beyond middle age. In 1959, while in hospital, he completed his first novel, Eating People is Wrong.

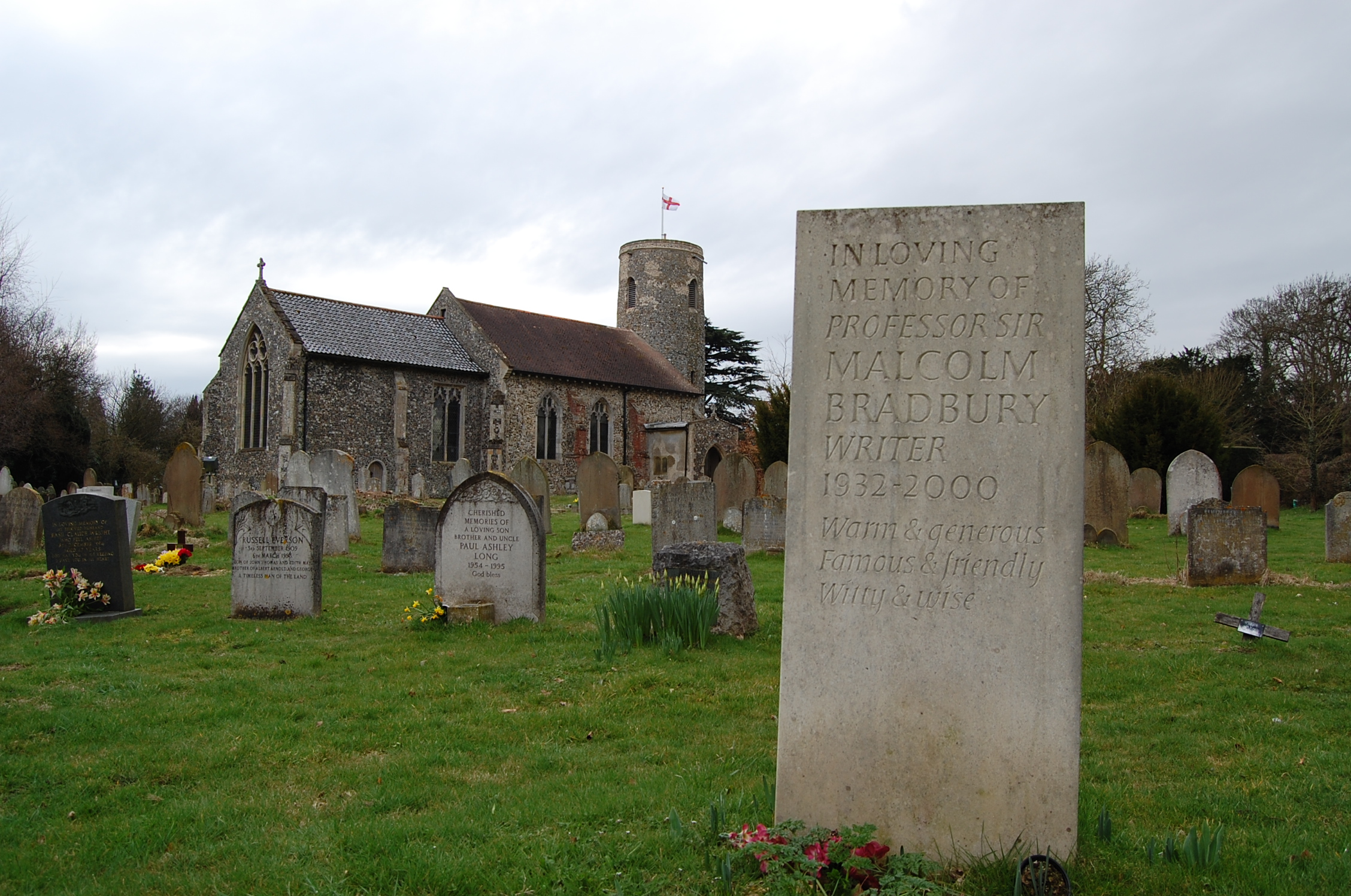
Malcolm Bradbury's grave at St Mary's Church, Tasburgh, Norfolk

Bradbury married Elizabeth Salt and they had two sons. He took up his first teaching post as an adult-education tutor at the University of Hull. With his study on Evelyn Waugh in 1962 he began his career of writing and editing critical books. From 1961 to 1965 he taught at the University of Birmingham. He completed his PhD in American studies at the University of Manchester in 1962, moving to the University of East Anglia (his second novel, Stepping Westward, appeared in 1965), where he became Professor of American Studies in 1970 and launched the MA in Creative Writing course, attended by both Ian McEwan and Kazuo Ishiguro.

He published Possibilities: Essays on the State of the Novel in 1973, The History Man in 1975, Who Do You Think You Are? in 1976, Rates of Exchange in 1983 and Cuts: A Very Short Novel in 1987. He retired from academic life in 1995.

Bradbury became a Commander of the Order of the British Empire in 1991 for services to literature and was made a Knight Bachelor in the New Year Honours 2000, again for services to literature.

Bradbury died at Priscilla Bacon Lodge, Colman Hospital, Norwich, on 27 November 2000, attended by his wife and their two sons, Matthew and Dominic. He was buried on 4 December 2000 in the churchyard of St Mary's parish church, Tasburgh, near Norwich where the Bradburys owned a second home. Though he was not an orthodox religious believer, he respected the traditions and socio-cultural role of the Church of England and enjoyed visiting churches in the spirit of Philip Larkin's poem, "Church Going".

== Works ==
Bradbury was a productive academic writer as well as a successful teacher; an expert on the modern novel, he published books on Evelyn Waugh, Saul Bellow and E. M. Forster, as well as editions of such modern classics as F. Scott Fitzgerald's The Great Gatsby, and a number of surveys and handbooks of modern fiction, both British and American. He is best known to a wider public as a novelist. Although often compared with his contemporary David Lodge, a friend who also wrote campus novels, Bradbury's books are consistently darker in mood and less playful in style and language. In 1986, he wrote a short humorous book titled Why Come to Slaka?, a parody of travel books, dealing with Slaka, the fictional Eastern European country that is the setting for his novel Rates of Exchange, a 1983 novel that was shortlisted for the Booker Prize.

Bradbury also wrote extensively for television, including scripting series such as Anything More Would Be Greedy, The Gravy Train (and its sequel, The Gravy Train Goes East, which explored life in Bradbury's fictional Slaka), and adapting novels such as Tom Sharpe's Blott on the Landscape and Porterhouse Blue, Alison Lurie's Imaginary Friends, Kingsley Amis's The Green Man, and the penultimate Inspector Morse episode The Wench is Dead. His last television script was for Dalziel and Pascoe series 5, produced by Andy Rowley. The episode "Foreign Bodies" was screened on BBC One on 15 July 2000.

His work was often humorous and ironic, mocking academics, British culture, and communism, usually with a picaresque tone.

== Selected bibliography ==
- Eating People is Wrong (1959)
- Writers and Critics: Evelyn Waugh (Oliver and Boyd, 1964)
- Stepping Westward (1965)
- Two Poets with Allan Rodway (Byron Press, 1966)
- Contemporary Criticism (1970)
- The Social Context of Modern English Literature (1971)
- Possibilities (1973)
- The History Man (1975)
- Who Do You Think You Are? (1976) — a collection of short stories
- All Dressed Up and Nowhere To Go (1982)
- The After Dinner Game (1982)
- Rates of Exchange (1983) – includes description of a performance of the imaginary opera Vedontakal Vrop, also described in Why Come to Slaka?
- The Modern American Novel (1983)
- Why Come to Slaka? (1986)
- Cuts (1987)
- Mensonge (1987)
- My Strange Quest for Mensonge: Structuralism's Hidden Hero (1987)
- No Not Bloomsbury (1987)
- Unsent Letters (1988)
- The Modern World: Ten Great Writers (1988)
- Doctor Criminale (1992)
- The Modern British Novel (1993)
- Dangerous Pilgrimages: Trans-Atlantic Mythologies and the Novel (1995)
- To the Hermitage (2000)

== See also ==
- American Studies in Britain
