= The Thorn Birds =

1977 novel by Colleen McCullough

- First edition
- Author: Colleen McCullough
- Language: English
- Genre: Family saga
- Publisher: Harper & Row
- Publication date: April 1977
- Publication place: Australia
- Media type: Print (Hardback & Paperback)
- Pages: 692
- ISBN: 0-06-012956-5
- OCLC: 2886288
- Dewey Decimal: 823
- LC Class: PR9619.3.M32 T5 1977

The Thorn Birds is a 1977 novel by Australian author Colleen McCullough. Set primarily on Drogheda—a fictional sheep station in the Australian Outback named after Drogheda, Ireland—the story focuses on the Cleary family and spans 1915 to 1969. The novel is the best-selling book in Australian history and has sold over 33 million copies worldwide.

The novel was also adapted into an eponymous television miniseries; during its 27–30 March 1983 run, it became the United States' second-highest rated miniseries of all time, behind Roots. Subsequently, a 1996 miniseries entitled The Thorn Birds: The Missing Years filled in a gap of 19 years in the middle of the novel. It was criticised for inconsistencies with the original series.

The novel was also adapted into a musical in 2009, The Thorn Birds Musical. In 2022, The Thorn Birds was included on the Big Jubilee Read list of 70 books by Commonwealth authors, selected to celebrate the Platinum Jubilee of Elizabeth II.

== Plot ==
The story begins in New Zealand on 8 December 1915, the fourth birthday of Meghann "Meggie" Cleary, who is the only daughter of Padraic ("Paddy"), an Irish farm labourer, and Fiona ("Fee"), his wife. Meggie is a beautiful child with curly red-gold hair, but receives little coddling and must struggle to hold her own in the family, which includes five older brothers at the time. Her favourite brother is the eldest, Frank, a rebellious young man who is unwillingly preparing himself for the blacksmith's trade. He is much shorter than his other brothers, but very strong. Unlike the other Clearys, he has black hair and eyes, believed to be inherited from his Maori great-great-grandmother.

Paddy has a wealthy sister, Mary Carson, a widow who lives in New South Wales, Australia, on Drogheda, an enormous sheep station. One day, Paddy receives an offer from Mary of a job on her estate, so in 1921, the whole Cleary family moves from New Zealand to Australia.

In Drogheda, the family meets Ralph de Bricassart, a young, capable, and ambitious priest. As punishment for insulting a bishop, he has been relegated to a remote parish in the town of Gillanbone, near Drogheda. Ralph has befriended Mary Carson, hoping a hefty bequest from her to the Catholic Church might liberate him from his exile. Ralph is "a beautiful man", and Mary goes to great lengths to tempt him to break his vows. Ralph shrugs off her attentions and ploys and continues his visits. He cares for all of the Clearys and particularly cherishes forlorn little Meggie.

Frank's relationship with his father, Paddy, has never been peaceful. The two vie for Fee's attention. Frank resents the many pregnancies Paddy has caused her to endure. Fee, now in her 40s, reveals she is again pregnant; the two men quarrel violently, and Paddy tells Frank he is not his biological son. Fee, the daughter of a prominent New Zealand citizen, is revealed to have had an affair with a married politician. The result, Frank, was already 18 months old when Fee married Paddy. Because he resembles her lost love, Frank has always been Fee's favourite child. After the argument with Paddy, Frank runs away to become a prizefighter. Fee gives birth to twin boys, James and Patrick (Jims and Patsy), but shows little interest in them. Shortly afterward, Meggie's beloved little brother, Hal, dies.

With Frank gone and Hal dead, Meggie clings to Ralph de Bricassart, who has been her constant mentor and friend. As she grows into womanhood, some begin to question their close relationship, including Ralph and Meggie themselves. Mary Carson, motivated by jealousy mingled with Machiavellian cruelty, devises a plan to separate Ralph from Meggie by tempting him with a high place in the church hierarchy. Although her will of record leaves the bulk of her estate to Paddy, she quietly writes a new one, making the Roman Catholic Church the main beneficiary and Ralph the executor.

In the new will, the true magnitude of Mary's wealth is finally revealed. Drogheda is not the centre of her fortune as Ralph and Paddy have long believed, but is merely a hobby, a diversion from her true financial interests. Mary's wealth is derived from a vast, multinational financial empire worth over 13 million pounds (equivalent to $1157 million in 2022). The sheer size of Mary's bequest will guarantee Ralph's rapid rise in the church. She also makes sure that after she dies, only Ralph, at first, will know of the new will – forcing him to choose between Meggie and his own ambition. She also provides for her disinherited brother, promising all his grandchildren and him a home on Drogheda as long as any of them lives.

At Mary's 75th birthday party, Ralph goes to great lengths to avoid Meggie, now 17 and dressed in a beautiful rose-pink evening gown. Later, he explains to Meggie that others might not see his attention as innocent. Mary dies later that night, and Ralph learns of the new will. He sees at once the subtle genius of Mary's plan, and although he weeps and calls her "a disgusting old spider", he takes the new will to her lawyer without delay. The lawyer, scandalised, urges Ralph to destroy the will, but to no avail. The bequest of 13 million pounds works its expected magic and Ralph soon leaves for Sydney to begin his rapid advance in the church.

Before he leaves, Meggie confesses her love for him and they share a passionate kiss, but Ralph pulls away because of his duties as a priest, and begs Meggie to find a suitable partner.

The Clearys learn that Frank has been convicted of murder after killing someone in a fight. Frank spends three decades in prison.

More tragedy follows: Paddy dies in a lightning fire, and son Stu is killed by a wild boar shortly after finding his father's body. Meanwhile, Ralph, unaware of Paddy and Stu's deaths, is on his way back to Drogheda after hearing of the fire. He suffers minor injuries when his plane bogs in the mud. As Meggie tends his wounds, their passion is reignited, but again Ralph rebuffs Meggie, and he remains at Drogheda only long enough to conduct the funerals.

Three years later, a sheep shearer named Luke O'Neill begins to court Meggie. Although his motives are more mercenary than romantic, she marries him because he looks a little bit like Ralph, and also because Luke is not Catholic and she wants little to do with religion – her own way of getting back at Ralph. She soon realises her mistake. After a brief honeymoon, Luke, a skinflint who regards women as sex objects and prefers the company of men, finds Meggie a live-in job with a kindly couple, the Muellers, and leaves to join a gang of itinerant sugarcane cutters in North Queensland. Before he leaves, he appropriates all Meggie's savings and arranges to have her wages paid directly to him. He tells her he is saving money to buy a homestead; however, he quickly becomes obsessed with the competitive toil of cutting cane and has no real intention of giving it up. Hoping to change Luke's ambition and settle him down, Meggie deliberately thwarts his usual contraception and bears Luke a red-haired daughter, Justine. The new baby, however, makes little impression on Luke.

Father Ralph visits Meggie during her difficult labour. He has come to say goodbye, as he is leaving Australia for Rome. He sees Meggie's unhappiness and pities her. Justine proves to be a fractious baby, so the Muellers send Meggie to an isolated island resort for a rest. Father Ralph returns to Australia, learns of Meggie's whereabouts from Anne Mueller, and joins her for several days. There, at last, the lovers consummate their passion, and Ralph realises that despite his ambition to be the perfect priest, his desire for Meggie makes him a man like other men. He returns to the church, and Meggie, now pregnant with Ralph's child, decides to separate from Luke. She sleeps one last time with Luke to ensure that her child's paternity will not be questioned, then tells Luke what she really thinks of him and returns to Drogheda, leaving him to his cane-cutting.

Back home, she gives birth to a beautiful boy whom she names Dane. Fee, who has had experience in such matters, notices Dane's resemblance to Ralph as soon as he is born. The relationship between Meggie and Fee takes a turn for the better. Justine grows into an independent, keenly intelligent girl who loves her brother dearly, but she has little use for anyone else and calmly rebuffs Meggie's overtures of motherly affection. None of Meggie's other surviving brothers ever marry, and Drogheda gradually becomes a place filled with old people.

Ralph visits Drogheda after a long absence, and meets Dane for the first time; although he finds himself strangely drawn to the boy, he fails to recognise that they are father and son. The long-imprisoned Frank is also finally paroled at this time, thanks to Ralph's intercession, and returns to Drogheda a broken man. Dane grows up and decides, to Meggie's dismay, to become a priest. Fee tells Meggie that what she stole from God she must now give back. Justine, meanwhile, decides to become an actress and leaves Australia to seek her career in England. Ralph, now a cardinal, becomes a mentor to Dane, but is still blind to the fact that the young man is his own son. Dane is also unaware of their true relationship. Ralph takes great care of him, and because of their resemblance, people mistake them for uncle and nephew. Ralph and Dane encourage the rumour.

Justine and her brother remain close, although he is often shocked at her sexual adventures and free-wheeling lifestyle. She befriends Rainer Hartheim, a German politician who is a great friend of both Dane and Ralph's, and who falls deeply in love with her. Their friendship becomes the most important thing in her life and is on the verge of becoming something more when tragedy strikes.

Dane, who has just become a priest, is vacationing in Greece. While there, he goes swimming one day and drowns while attempting to rescue two women from a dangerous current. Meggie reveals before Dane's funeral that Dane is Ralph's son. Ralph dies in Meggie's arms after the funeral.

Justine breaks off all communications with Rainer and falls into a depressed, hum-drum existence. Eventually, they renew their acquaintance on strictly platonic terms, until Rainer visits Drogheda alone to urge Meggie to help him pursue Justine's hand in marriage. Justine, now the sole surviving grandchild of Fee and Paddy Cleary, finally accepts her true feelings for Rainer, and they marry.

== Thornbird myth ==
In the front matter of the book, the myth is set out:

There is a legend about a bird which sings just once in its life, more sweetly than any other creature on the face of the earth. From the moment it leaves the nest it searches for a thorn tree, and does not rest until it has found one. Then, singing among the savage branches, it impales itself upon the longest, sharpest spine. And, dying, it rises above its own agony to out-carol the lark and the nightingale. One superlative song, existence the price. But the whole world stills to listen, and God in His heaven smiles. For the best is only bought at the cost of great pain.... Or so says the legend.

Since the publication of the book, the "thorn bird" of the title has been described in various nonscholarly sources as "an old Celtic legend".

== List of characters ==
- Meghann "Meggie" Cleary – The central character, she is the only daughter in a large family of sons. The novel takes her from early childhood to old age.
- Father Ralph de Bricassart – Meggie's true love, he is a handsome, ambitious Irish Catholic priest.
- Padraic "Paddy" Cleary – Meggie's father, a kind and simple Irish labourer
- Fiona "Fee" Armstrong Cleary – Paddy's wife and Meggie's mother, she is an aristocratic woman who bore a child out of wedlock before marrying Paddy Cleary.
- Francis "Frank" Armstrong Cleary – Meggie's eldest brother, Fee's out-of-wedlock first son, Paddy's stepson, he is a favourite of both Meggie and Fee. He becomes a prizefighter.
- Mary Elizabeth Cleary Carson – Paddy's immensely wealthy older sister, Father Ralph's benefactor, owner of Drogheda
- Luke O'Neill – Meggie's husband and the father of Justine
- Dane O'Neill – Son of Meggie and Ralph, who drowns in Greece at the age of 26
- Justine O'Neill – Daughter of Meggie and Luke, an intelligent, independent girl
- Luddie and Anne Mueller – Meggie's employers during her marriage to Luke, they become lifelong friends.
- Bob, Jack, and Hughie Cleary – Three of Meggie's older brothers, they all resemble Paddy and live out their days, unmarried, on Drogheda.
- Stuart "Stu" Cleary – A quiet, kindly boy, he resembles his mother. Of Meggie's five older brothers, he is the closest to her in age.
- Harold "Hal" Cleary – Meggie's cherished baby brother, he dies when he is four years old.
- James and Patrick "Jims and Patsy" Cleary – Twin boys, they are Meggie's youngest brothers.
- Rainer "Rain" Moerling Hartheim – Friend of Ralph's and eventually Dane's, he is a member of the West German Parliament and eventual husband of Justine.
- Archbishop (later Cardinal) Vittorio di Contini-Verchese – Ralph's mentor, friend to Rainer and Dane

== Trivia ==
The Thorn Birds played a recurring role as a joke element in the TV show Late Night with Seth Meyers. During the COVID-19 pandemic, as he taped the show from his home, the book appeared on a side table. On different camera cuts, the book will appear again with adjusted titles, sometimes many at a time.
