= Colleen McCullough =

Australian author (1937–2015)

Colleen McCullough AO
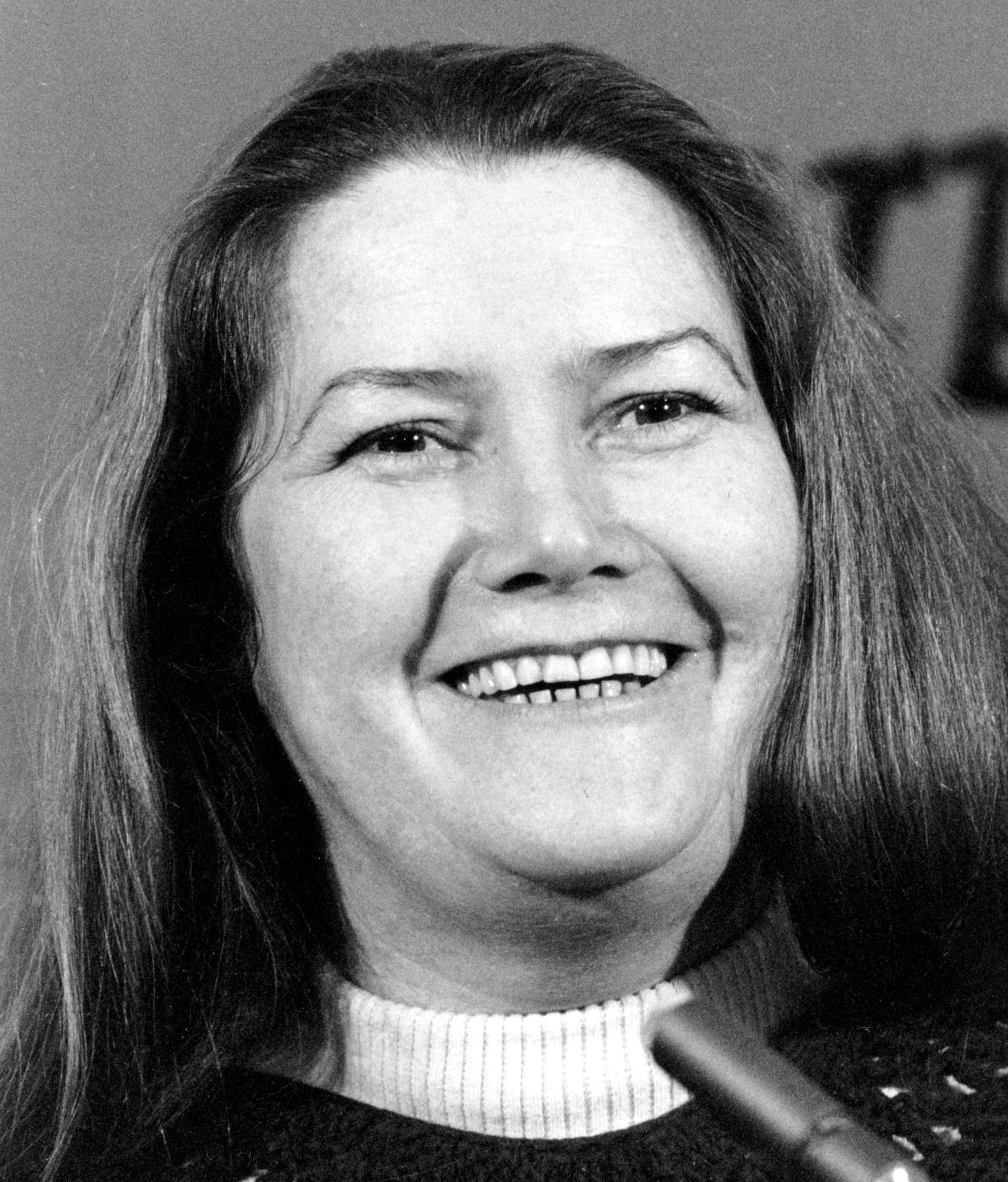
- McCullough in 1977
- Born: Colleen Margaretta McCullough; 1 June 1937; Wellington, New South Wales, Australia
- Died: 29 January 2015 (aged 77); Burnt Pine, Norfolk Island
- Occupation: Novelist
- Spouse: Ric Robinson (m. 1984)
- Writing career
- Genres: Romance; historical fiction; mystery
- Notable work: The Thorn Birds

Colleen McCullough AO (/məˈkʌlə/; 1 June 1937 – 29 January 2015) was an Australian author. Raised in Sydney, she trained as a neurophysiologist and spent her early career working at hospitals and universities in Australia and overseas. In 1974, while working as a research assistant at the Yale School of Medicine, she published her first novel Tim. Her second novel, The Thorn Birds, was published in 1977 and became an international bestseller. It sold more than 30 million copies worldwide and was adapted into a successful television miniseries.

Soon after the release of The Thorn Birds, McCullough moved to Norfolk Island where she spent the remainder of her life. McCullough wrote a total of 25 novels over the course of her career, in genres including romance, mystery, and historical fiction. A writer of popular fiction, her novels were commercially successful but attracted relatively little attention from literary scholars and critics. She was named one of Australia's 100 National Living Treasures in 1997 and was appointed an Officer of the Order of Australia in 2006. She died on Norfolk Island in 2015.

== Early life ==
McCullough was born on 1 June 1937 in Wellington, New South Wales, to James and Laurie McCullough. Her father was of Irish descent and worked as a sugarcane cutter, while her mother was a New Zealander of Māori descent. During her childhood, the family moved frequently. Colleen later described her childhood as unhappy, calling her father a "right bastard, a rogue and philanderer" and her mother "bitterly anti-intellectual". She had a younger brother, Carl, with whom she was close. Carl drowned at the age of 25 in 1965 after rescuing a pair of swimmers off the coast of Crete; while his death was ruled an accident, McCullough believed that it was a suicide.

The family eventually settled in Sydney, where Colleen attended Holy Cross College, Woollahra, on a scholarship. She enrolled to study medicine at the University of Sydney before switching to studying neurophysiology due to an allergy to hospital soap that prevented her from treating patients directly. After her graduation, she worked at the Royal North Shore Hospital in Sydney and at Great Ormond Street Hospital in London. She then spent the next ten years working as a research assistant at the Yale Medical School.

== Writing career ==
While working at Yale, McCullough wrote her first novel Tim in an attempt to supplement her income. McCullough initially struggled to find a publisher for the manuscript, but eventually persuaded the literary agent Frieda Fishbein to take on the work. Tim, published by Harper and Row in 1974, depicts the romance between a middle-aged woman and a younger intellectually disabled man. McCullough earned a total of US$50,000 (equivalent to $326,000 in 2025) from the book, which sold 10,000 hardcover copies and was adapted into a film starring Mel Gibson and Piper Laurie.

In 1977, McCullough published her second and best-known book, The Thorn Birds. It was a major commercial success, eventually selling more than 30 million copies, making it one of Australia's best-selling novels of all time. The paperback rights to the novel were sold at auction to Avon Books for a record-setting US$1.9 million (equivalent to $10,090,000 in 2025) in 1977. The novel tells the story of multiple generations of the Irish-Australian Cleary family on a sheep station in rural Australia, and centres on the romance between Meggie Cleary and a Catholic priest named Ralph de Bricassart. It was adapted into a successful television miniseries starring Richard Chamberlain and Rachel Ward in 1983, and has since been translated into 20 languages. McCullough later refused to write a sequel to the novel and described the television adaptation as "instant vomit", complaining that the adaptation stripped out the nuance of her novel and that the acting was poor.

Shortly after the publication of The Thorn Birds, McCullough moved to London to study nursing, but abandoned her plans of becoming a nurse due to the book's success. She returned to the United States, to Connecticut, and then to Norfolk Island, a remote South Pacific island with a population of around 2,000 people, to isolate herself from the pressures of her celebrity status. She married Ric Robinson, who was descended from Bounty mutineers, on 13 April 1984. McCullough was an advocate for Norfolk Island's Polynesian culture and self-governance. She sparked controversy in 2004 after criticising the conviction of Pitcairn Islands men for child sexual abuse, arguing that sex with minors was a custom on the island and that it was wrong for Britain to interfere with the Polynesian inhabitants' indigenous practices.

In 1981 McCullough published her next novel, An Indecent Obsession. While the novel did not achieve the same success as The Thorn Birds, it sold around 3 million copies over the next eight years. The book was more positively reviewed, with critics viewing it as a more "serious" work than her earlier romances. She followed this with A Creed for the Third Millennium in 1985, a dystopian work of science fiction that was less commercially successful and was poorly received by critics. In 1987, McCullough published a short romance novel titled The Ladies of Missalonghi. McCullough was accused of plagiarism due to its similarities with The Blue Castle, a 1926 novel by L. M. Montgomery; McCullough denied the plagiarism accusations and attributed the similarities to subconscious recollection.

McCullough published The First Man in Rome, the first book in her Masters of Rome series of historical fiction set in Ancient Rome, in 1990. The series concluded in 2007 with the release of its seventh entry, Antony and Cleopatra. The series was praised by scholars as displaying a high level of research and historical accuracy, and attracted fans that included Premier Bob Carr, US Speaker of the House Newt Gingrich, and former US Secretary of State Henry Kissinger. In 2008, McCullough released a sequel to Pride and Prejudice entitled The Independence of Miss Mary Bennett. While the novel was criticised by Austen scholars, McCullough said that she welcomed this response and called Austen "overrated". McCullough also authored a series of mystery novels set in Connecticut about a 1960s detective named Carmine Delmonico, and a memoir titled Life Without the Boring Bits. In 2013 she released her final novel, Bittersweet, which depicted four sisters living in 1920s New South Wales.

== Death ==
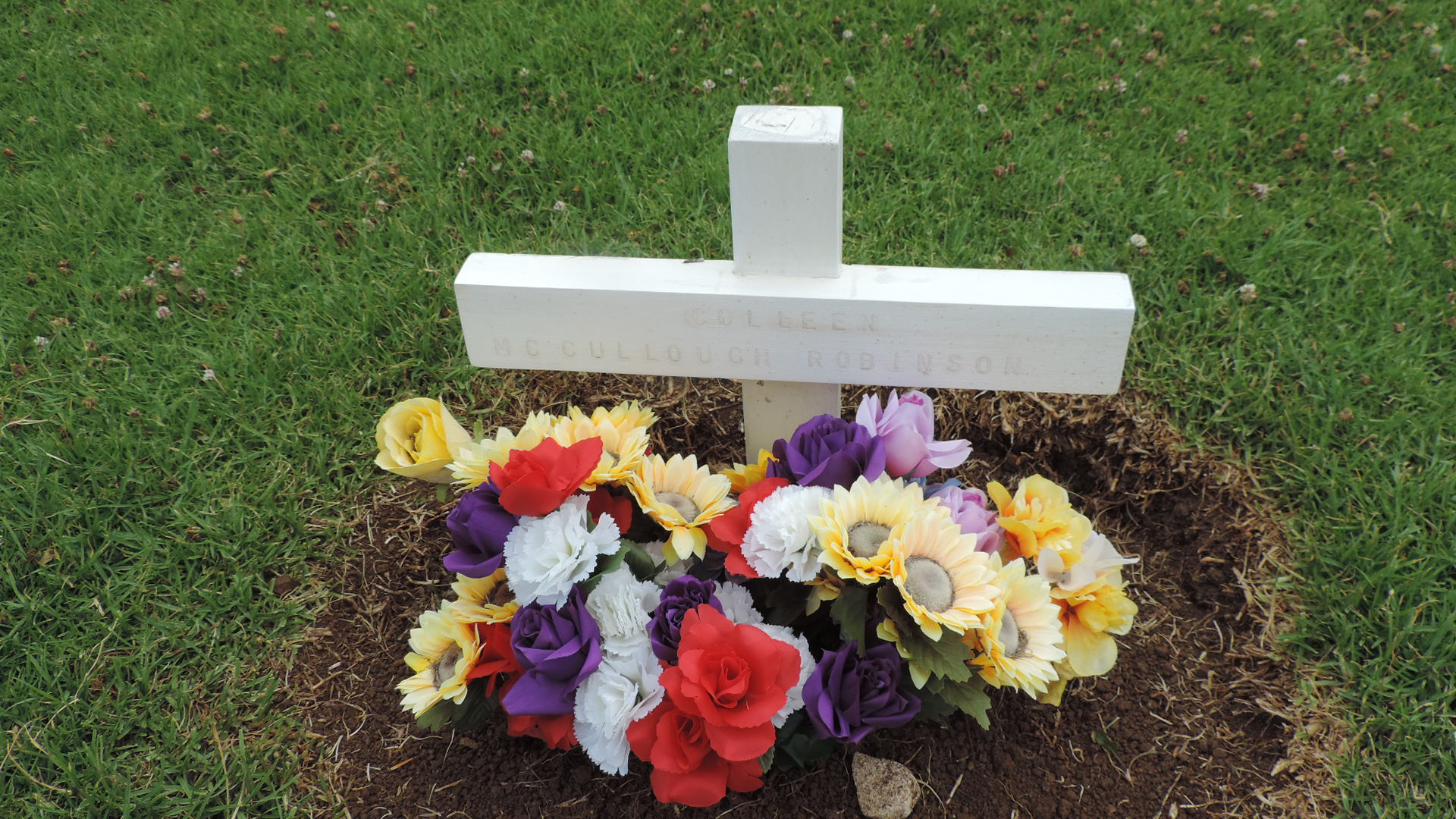
McCullough's headstone in Emily Bay Cemetery, Norfolk Island, 2015

McCullough died on 29 January 2015 at the age of 77 on Norfolk Island from renal failure after suffering a series of strokes. She had suffered from macular degeneration, osteoporosis, trigeminal neuralgia, diabetes and uterine cancer, and used a wheelchair full-time. She was buried at the Emily Bay cemetery on Norfolk Island on 4 February.

After McCullough's death, a legal dispute was launched over her estate. Her friend and executor Selwa Anthony argued that McCullough intended to leave her $2.1 million estate to the University of Oklahoma Foundation, while her husband presented a later document signed by McCullough leaving her estate to him. In 2018, the New South Wales Supreme Court ruled that McCullough had not been coerced into signing the later document and awarded her estate to her husband.

== Writing and reception ==
McCullough wrote a total of 25 novels in several genres, including romance, dystopia, mystery, and historical fiction. English professor Mary Jean DeMarr describes her works as "old-fashioned" novels that explore themes like love and duty. The literary scholar Gillian Whitlock writes that The Thorn Birds is a "conventionally romantic" work with a sensationalist plot. McCullough's novels were often lengthy; The Thorn Birds is 533 pages, and The First Man in Rome is 896 pages with a 100-page glossary.

The literary scholar Michelle Smith writes that, like many works of genre fiction written for a female audience, McCullough's early novels were often regarded as engaging but of limited literary merit. McCullough's works of popular fiction were generally not positively received by academic critics and were rarely considered for literary awards. Her later works of historical fiction were more positively received; Smith attributes this to their more "male-oriented" subject matter. Whitlock writes that the Masters of Rome series has been recognised as "a significant work of scholarship".

== Awards and honours ==
McCullough was named one of Australia's 100 National Living Treasures in 1997. She was awarded an honorary Doctorate of Letters by Macquarie University in 1993 and was appointed an Officer of the Order of Australia in 2006.

== Works ==
=== Novels ===
- Tim (1974)
- The Thorn Birds (1977)
- An Indecent Obsession (1981)
- A Creed for the Third Millennium (1985)
- The Ladies of Missalonghi (1987)
- The Song of Troy (1998)
- Morgan's Run (2000)
- The Touch (2003)
- Angel Puss (2005)
- The Independence of Miss Mary Bennet (2008)
- Bittersweet (2013)

=== Masters of Rome series ===
- The First Man in Rome (1990)
- The Grass Crown (1991)
- Fortune's Favourites (1993)
- Caesar's Women (1996)
- Caesar (1997)
- The October Horse (2002)
- Antony and Cleopatra (2007)

=== Carmine Delmonico series ===
- On, Off (2006)
- Too Many Murders (December 2009)
- Naked Cruelty (2010)
- The Prodigal Son (2012)
- Sins of the Flesh (2013)

=== Biographical work ===
- The Courage and the Will: The Life of Roden Cutler VC (1999)

=== Memoir ===
- Life Without the Boring Bits (2011)
