= Fontana di San Tommaso, Viterbo =

Fountain in Viterbo

Coordinates: 42.41490°N 12.10317°E

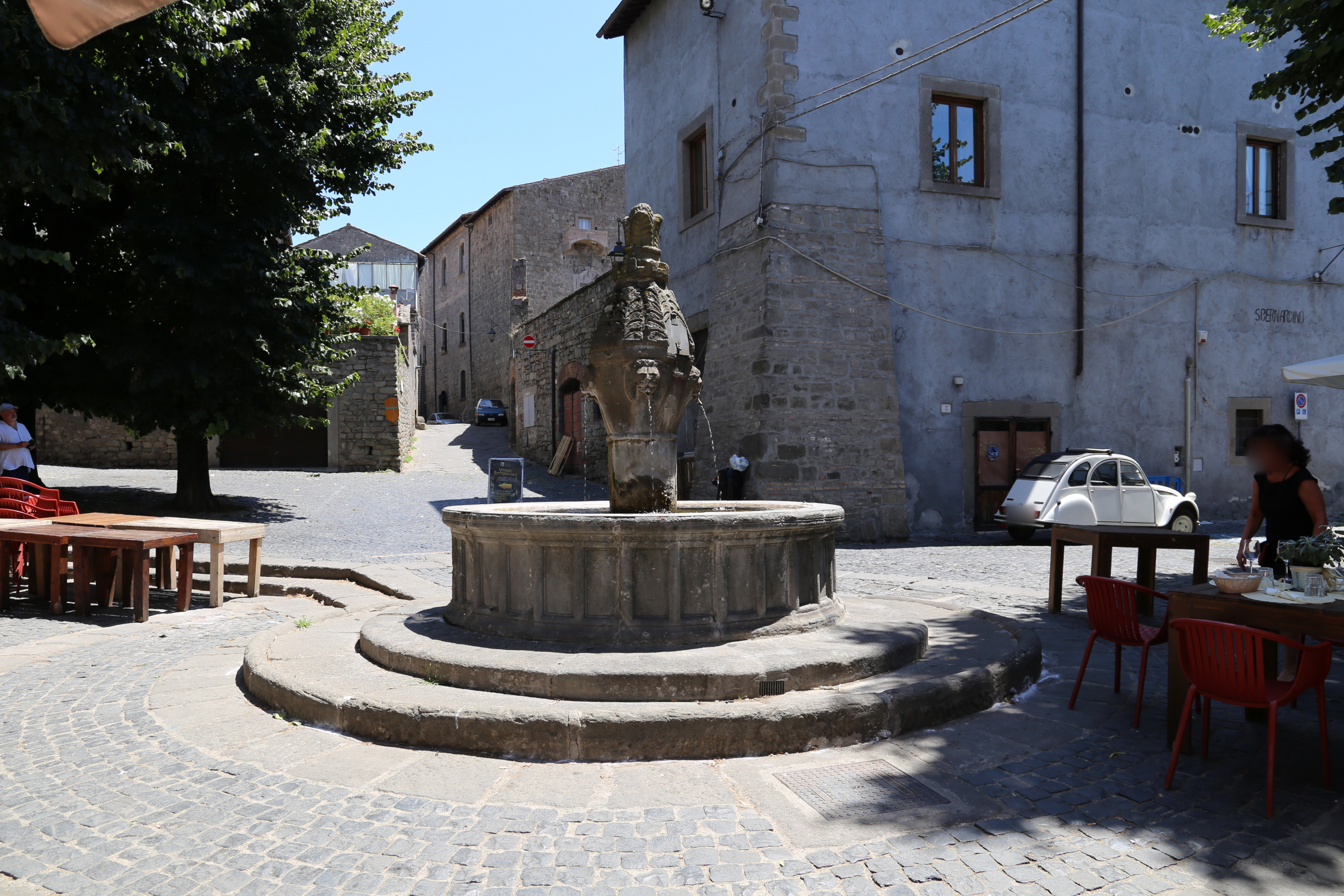
Fontana di Piazza della Morte

The Fontana di San Tommaso, also known as Fontana della Morte, is a medieval fountain located in a piazza located in Piazza della Morte, at the intersection of Via San Lorenzo and Via Pietra del Pesce on the western edge of historic Viterbo, region of Lazio, Italy. It stands a block east of the Palazzo Farnese, and located a block south of the church of San Silvestro.

== History and description ==
This fountain, in the shape of a pine cone with lion faces, was built in 1243. The lion is a symbol of Viterbo. As second nearby fountain existed on a Piazza di Carbonara, neither exists any longer. The piazza and fountain is also called della Morte, because in the 16th-century an oratory or small church at the site, no longer extant, was affiliated with the Confraternity of San Tommaso, also called della Morte because its members, wearing a black cloak were involved in retrieving the corpses of indigent or unclaimed individuals, and providing them with Christian burial. This was one of numerous Confraternities, each with their particular duty or activity and cloak color:

- San Giovanni Battista de Gonfalone in white cloak, raising donations for the liberation of enslaved Italians (typically those held under Saracen control)
- San Clemente in blond "lions" coat, devoted to the Virgin Mary
- Santa Maria Maddalena (dei Disciplinati), in white cloak with yellow whips, active as flagellants
- San Giovanni Decollato (della Misericordia) in black cloaks, ministering to those condemned to death
- San Rocco in green cloak, ministering to the abandoned or poor infirm
- San Silvestro in red cloak, ministering to orphans
- San Leonardo in red cloak, ministering to prisoners
- San Tommaso in black cloak, gathering unclaimed dead
- Santa Maria della Cella (Compagnia della Immacolata Concezione) in white cloak, devoted to the Virgin Mary

The church or oratory is no longer extant. In the building on Via San Lorenzo #85 is a plaque linking the building with an event in the life of the blessed Lucy Brocadelli (1476-1544), also known as Lucia of Narni or Narnia, a mystic and stigmatic Dominican nun.
