= Fontana di Piazza del Gesù, Viterbo =

Fountain in Viterbo

Coordinates: 42.41578°N 12.10377°E

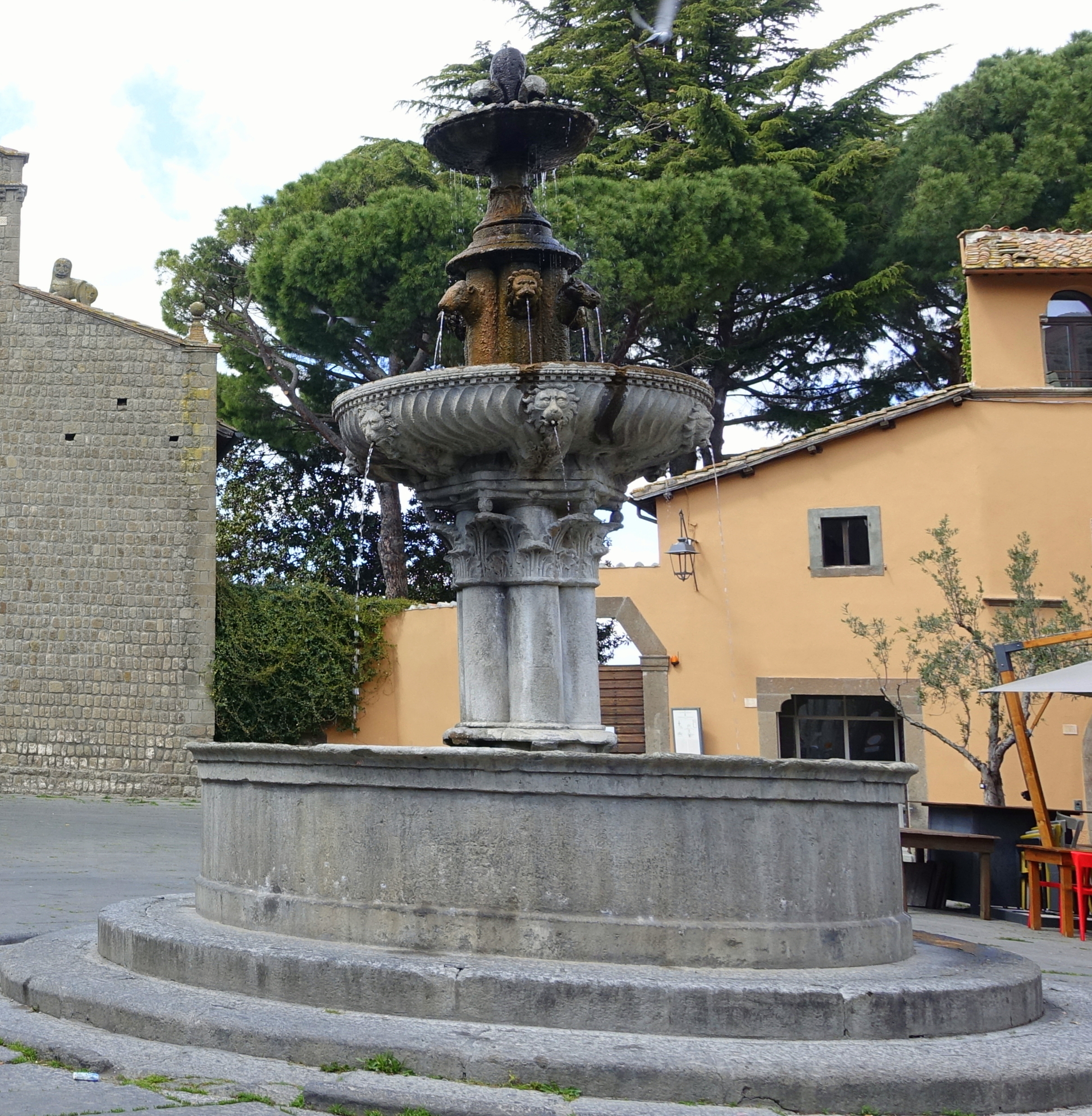

The Fontana della Piazza del Gesù is a Renaissance-style public fountain located in a piazza of the same name in the historic center of Viterbo, region of Lazio, Italy.

A fountain at this site, in front of the Jesuit church, now known as San Silvestro is mentioned for the first time in public documents in 1450. After centuries of litigation related to the flow of water, in the year 1727 the fountain was purchased by the Chigi family, they commissioned the repair of the tank and pipes in 1806. By 1915, it was decided to replace the fountain with a new structure made utilizing spolia from the fountain of the convent of San Domenico. A design by Giovanni Pizzichetti was selected. The lower basin is decorated with lion heads (symbol of Viterbo); while the upper basin stands on a tree decorated with alternating lion heads, oxen, horses and sheep.
