= Portrait of Ferdinand I of the Two Sicilies (Camuccini) =

Painting by Vincenzo Camuccini

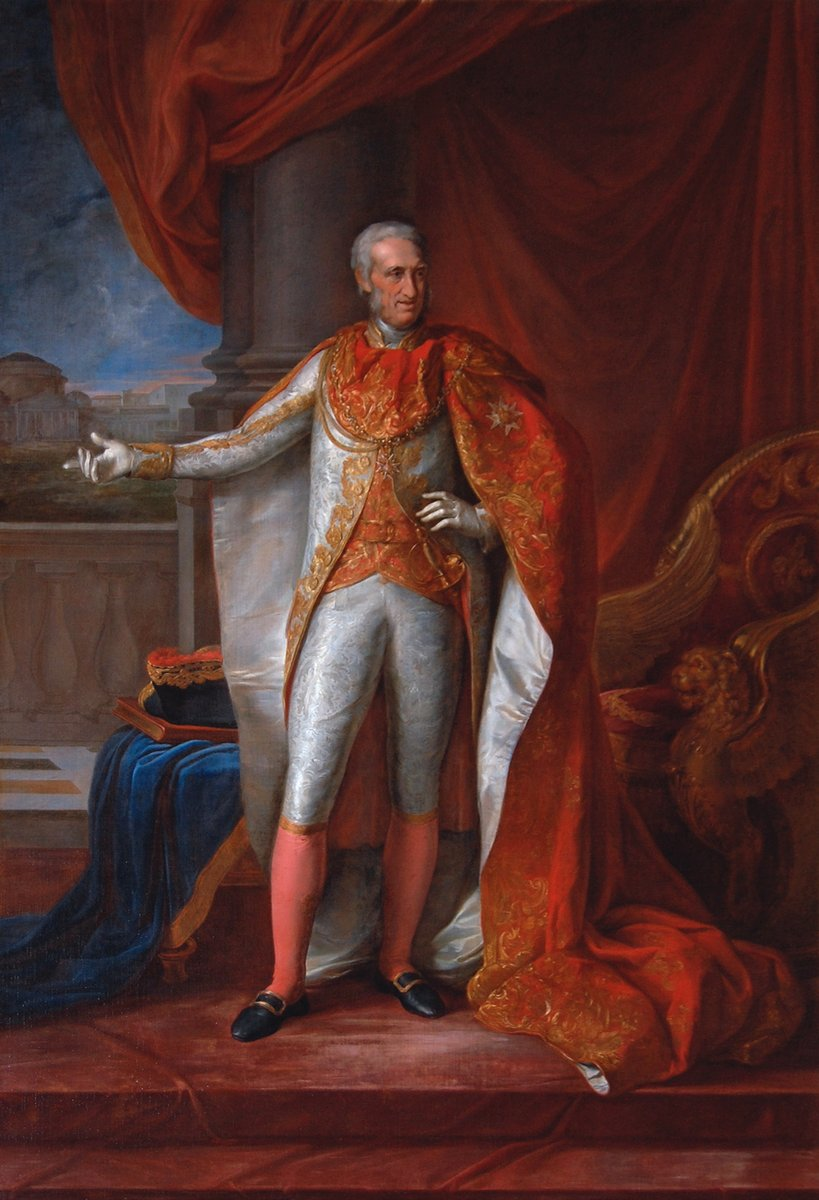
- Artist: Vincenzo Camuccini
- Year: 1819
- Type: Oil on canvas, portrait painting
- Dimensions: 300 cm × 200 cm (120 in × 79 in)
- Location: Royal Palace; Naples

Portrait of Ferdinand I of the Two Sicilies is an 1819 portrait painting by the Italian artist Vincenzo Camuccini. It depicts Ferdinand I of the Two Sicilies. A member of the Bourbon Dynasty, his reign had been interrupted by the Napoleonic Wars but the 1815 Congress of Vienna created him ruler of the newly established Kingdom of the Two Sicilies.

Camuccini was the leading portraitist in Rome, where he was commissioned by Ferdinand to produce portraits of both him and his second wife Lucia Migliaccio. He became Ferdinand's art advisor in 1819 and was a noted admirer of Raphael. The following year Ferdinand faced fresh problems with the Revolution of 1820 broke out. Today the painting is in the collection of the Royal Palace of Naples, the historic residence of Ferdinand.

== Bibliography ==
- Wolk-Simon, Linda. Raphael at the Metropolitan: The Colonna Altarpiece. Metropolitan Museum of Art, 2006.
