= Ptolemy II Philadelphus in the Library of Alexandria =

Painting by Vincenzo Camuccini

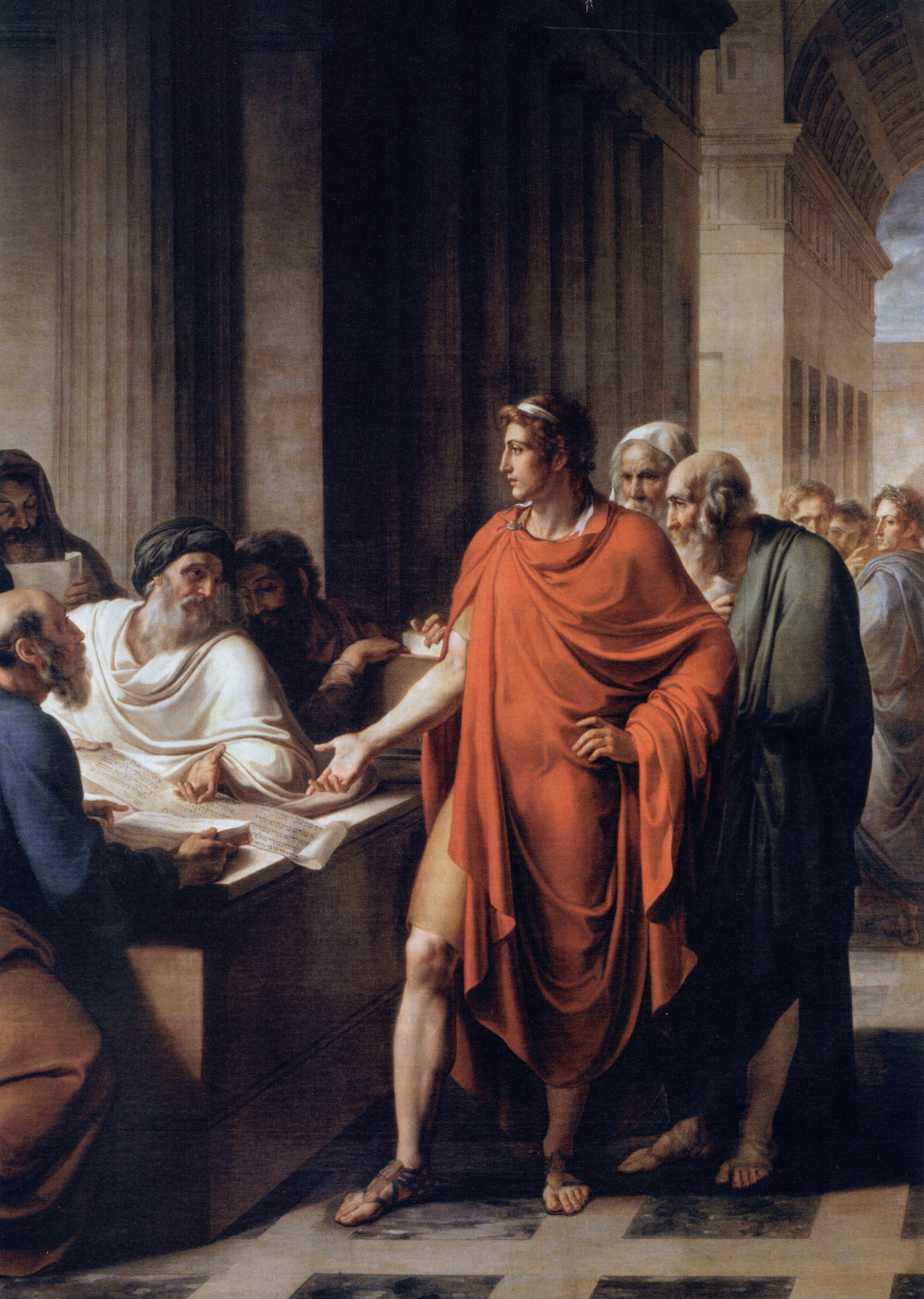
- Artist: Vincenzo Camuccini
- Year: 1813
- Medium: oil on canvas
- Dimensions: 263 cm × 337 cm (104 in × 133 in)
- Location: National Museum of Capodimonte, Naples

Ptolemy Philadelphus in the Library of Alexandria is an 1813 oil on canvas painting by Vincenzo Camuccini. It is now in the National Museum of Capodimonte in Naples.

== History ==
The work was commissioned by Napoleon I along with Charlemagne Ordering Italian Scholars to Found the University of Paris, both for the central hall of Rome's Palazzo del Quirinale. It shows Ptolemy II Philadelphus in red robes among several philosophers in the Library of Alexandria.

The artist had recently returned to Italy from Paris and decided to accept the commission. Ptolemy was then moved to the Capodimonte Palace by Gioacchino Murat and then in 1867 moved to the Palazzo Reale di Napoli, before being given to the Camera dei deputati in Palazzo Montecitorio in Rome. It later returned to Naples and since 1997 has hung in its original position in Room 31 of the Royal Apartments, also known as the Salone della Culla.
