= The Death of Julius Caesar (Camuccini) =

Painting by Vincenzo Camuccini

- La mort de Cèsar (Catalan)
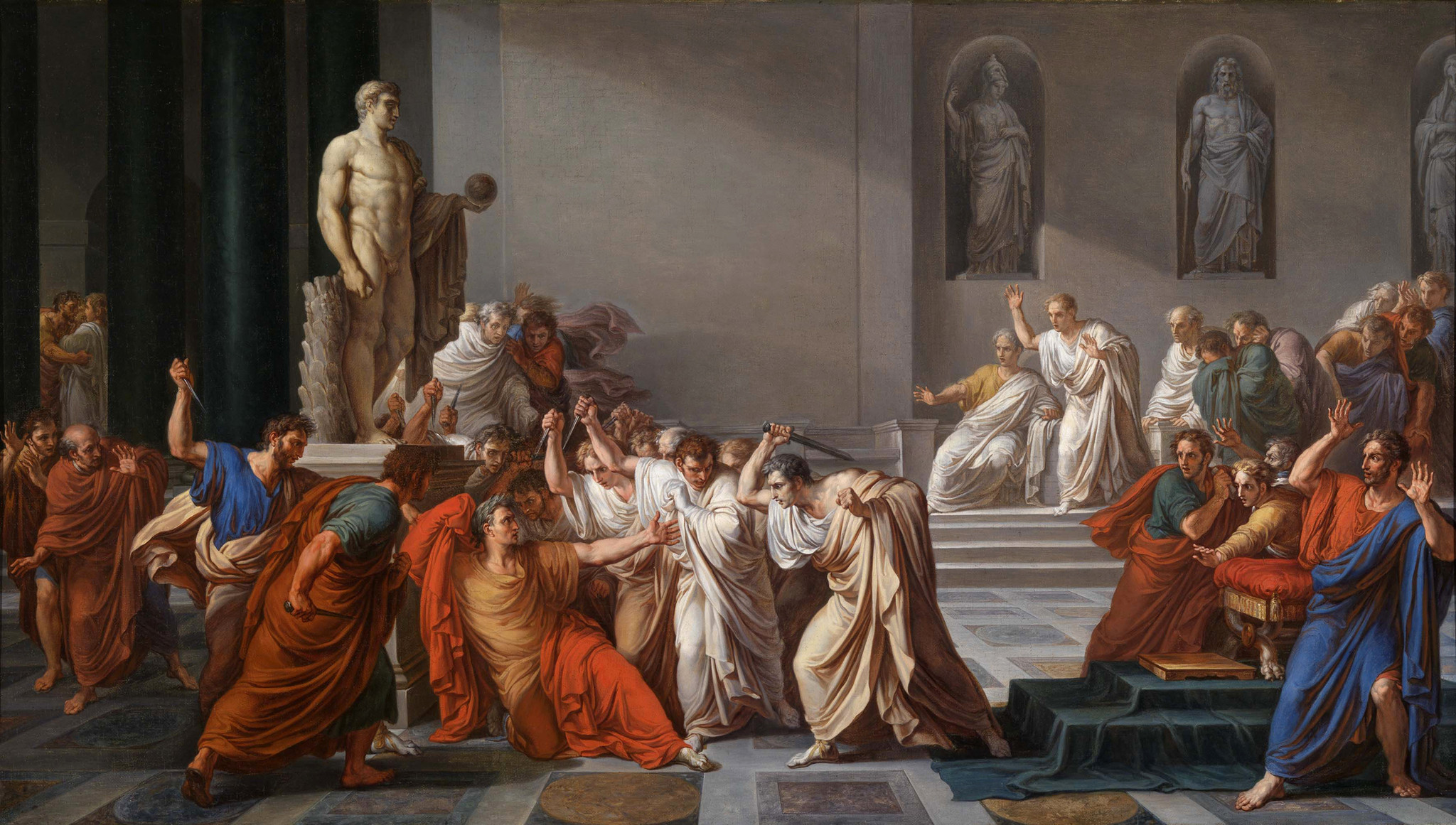
- Artist: Vincenzo Camuccini
- Year: 1806
- Subject: Assassination of Julius Caesar
- Location: Museo di Capodimonte, Naples

The Death of Julius Caesar (Catalan: La mort de Cèsar) is an 1806 painting by Vincenzo Camuccini depicting the assassination of Julius Caesar.

== History ==
The painting was originally commissioned in 1793 by Frederick Hervey, 4th Earl of Bristol, for whom he had already produced a copy of Raphael's Deposition. He completed a cartoon for the work in 1793 which was favourably received by art critics in Rome at the time. However, when he produced a first version of the painting in 1796, it was less well-received, and so he destroyed it and started again from scratch, completing the current version in 1806.

The Earl had died in 1803 and his heirs refused to pay for the work, so Camuccini instead sold it to Joachim Murat in 1807. After Murat's fall, it was acquired by Ferdinand II of the Two Sicilies and relocated to the Palazzo Reale in Naples. In 1864, it entered its present home, the National Museum of Capodimonte, in Naples.

== Bibliography ==
- Francesco Landolfi, inserto Arte 7 in Dal testo alla storia dalla storia al testo, ed. Paravia, p. 1. ISBN 88-395-3004-5
