= Giuseppe Cades =

Italian painter

Giuseppe Cades (March 4, 1750 – December 8, 1799) was a neo-classicist Italian draftsman, painter, engraver and sculptor, based in Rome. As both a draftsman known for his drawings and a painter, Cades worked in many media, including pencil, coloured chalks, watercolour, tempera with wax on canvas and oil paint on canvas.

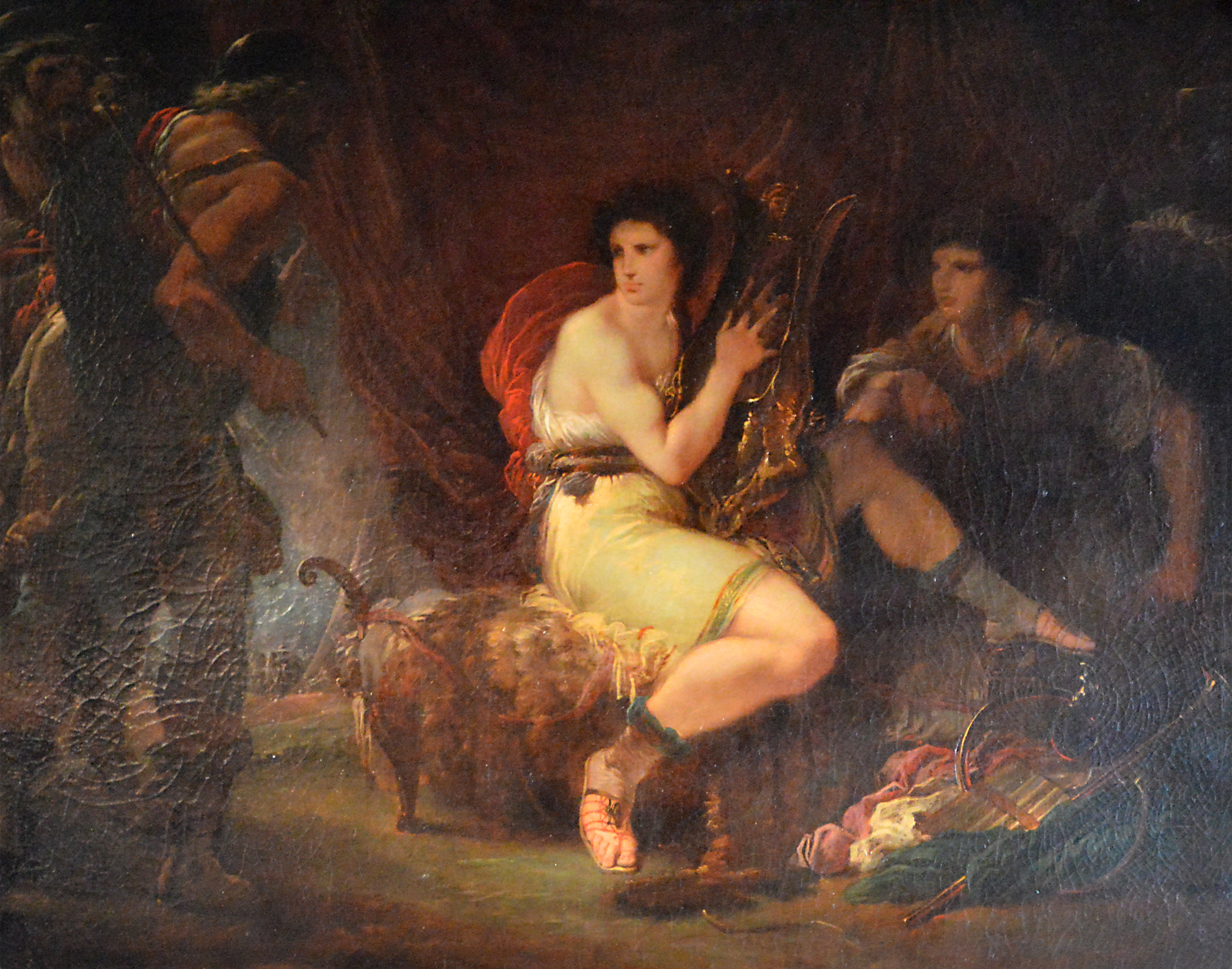
Achille, jouant de la lyre sous sa tente avec Patrocle, est surpris par Ulysse et Nestor.

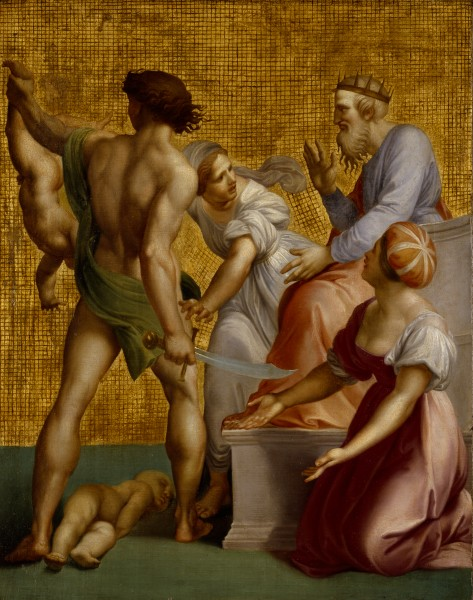
The Judgment of Solomon, Royal Academy of Arts, London.

== Biography ==
Cades was born in Rome. He studied at the Accademia di San Luca under Mancini and Domenico Corvi, having won a minor prize aged 12 he went on to gain a major prize in 1765, aged 16, with his picture of Tobias Recovering His Sight.

In 1766, after quarreling with his master, he visited Florence. Two years later, he executed an altarpiece for the church of San Benedetto in Turin and in 1771 another for the church of Santi Apostoli. He also decorated the Palazzo Chigi with frescoes, landscapes, and scenes from Tasso. He has left two etchings, Christ Blessing Little Children and The Death of Leonardo da Vinci.

Cades' early commissions were influenced by the Baroque Classicist painter Carlo Maratta. In the mid-1770s, Cades came to know Swiss painter Johann Heinrich Fuseli and toured Northern Italy, and his work began to show Mannerist and Renaissance influences as well. His oil on canvas painting “Achille jouant de la lyre avec Patrocle, sous sa tente, surpris par Ulysse et Nestor” (English: Achilles in his tent with Patroclus playing the lyre, surprised by Odysseus and Nestor) was produced ca 1782. It was acquired by the Louvre museum in 1980 and as of 2025 is on display in the Denon Wing, level 1, in room 718.

Cades again joined the Accademia di San Luca of Rome, now as a fellow, in 1786. Late in life, Catherine the Great of Russia commissioned an artwork from him. He died in Rome.

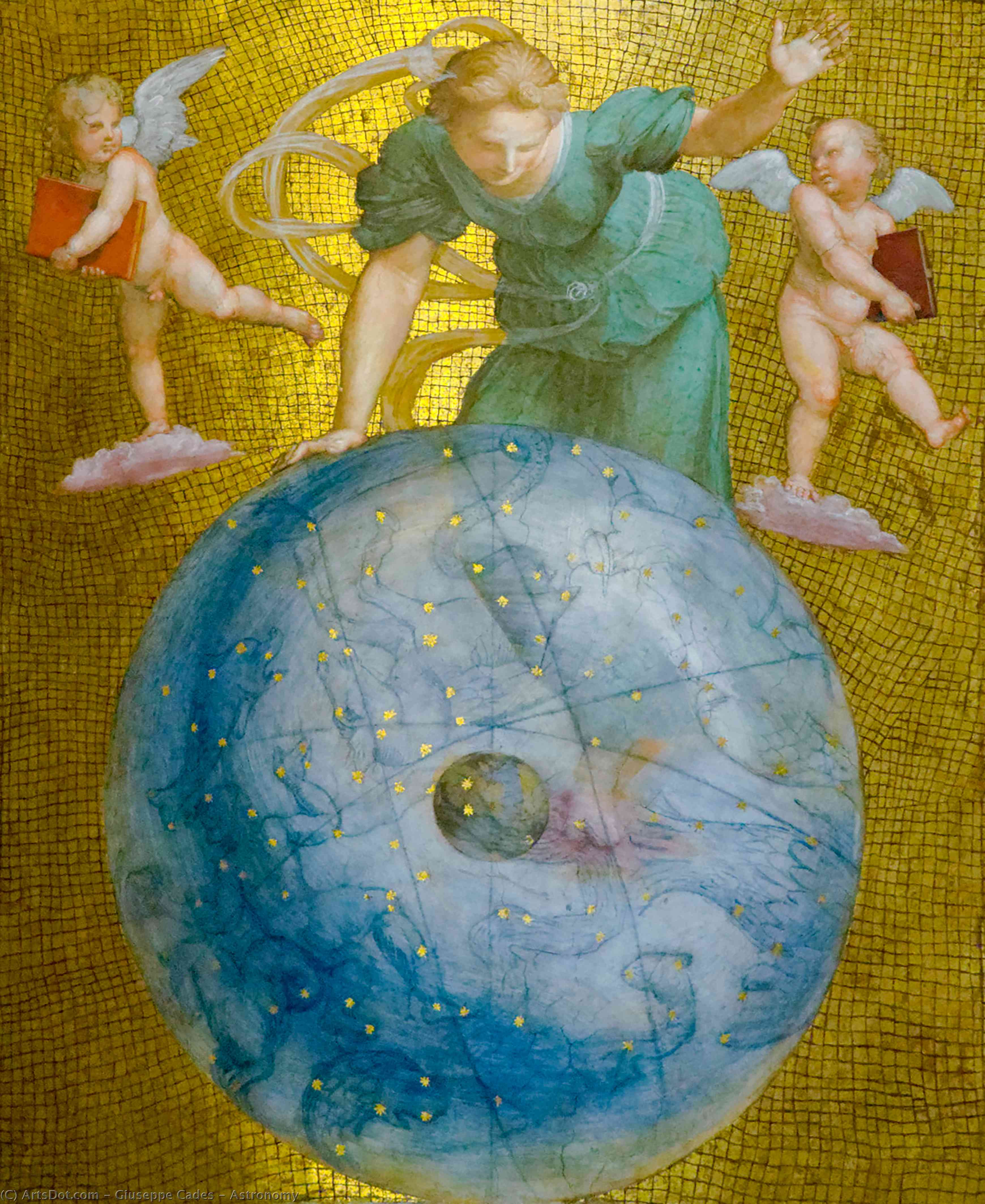
Giuseppe Cades - Astronomy
