= Vincenzo Camuccini =

Italian painter (1771–1844)

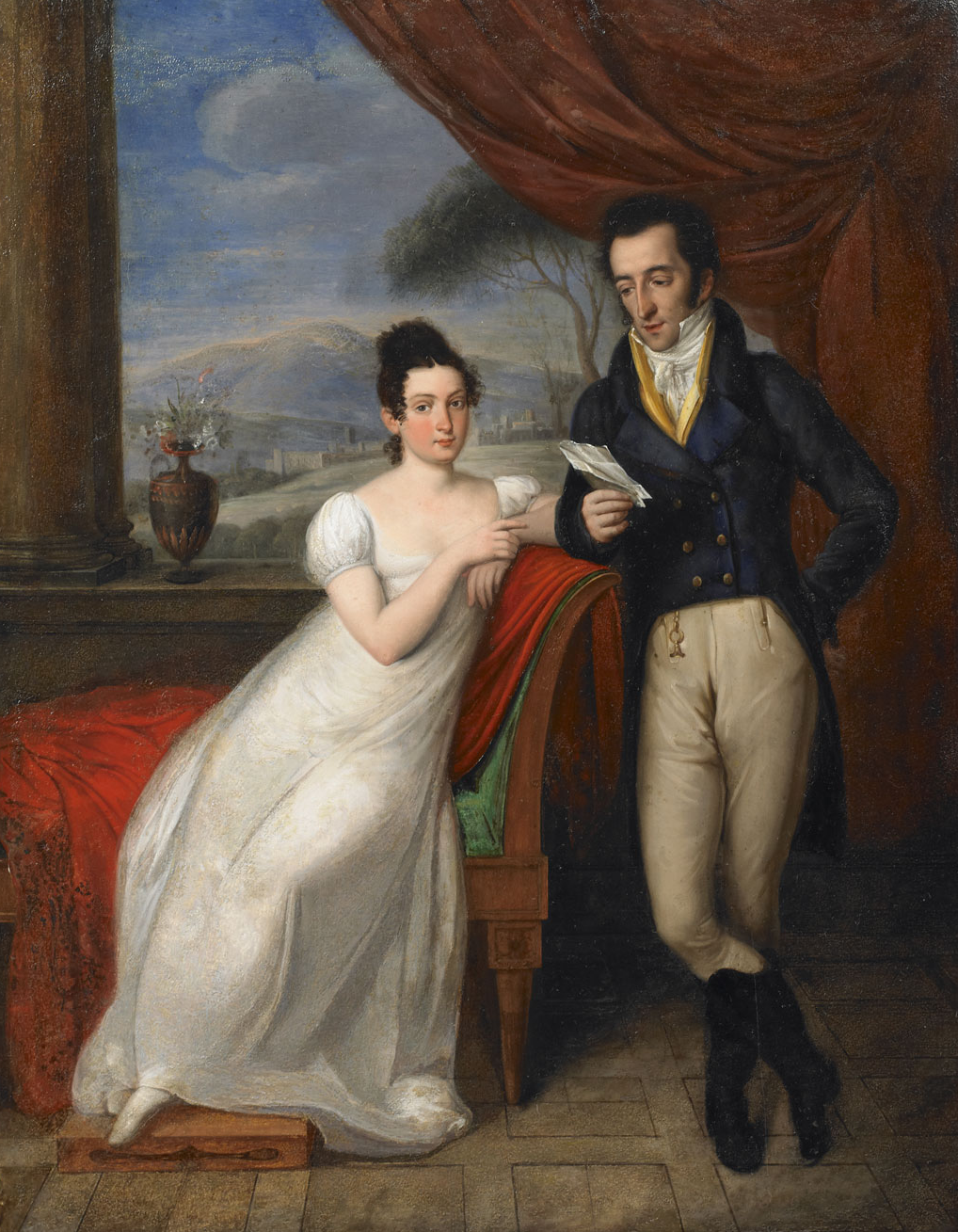
- Camuccini's Self Portrait of the Artist with his Wife, c. 1805–1815
- Born: 22 February 1771; Rome, Papal States
- Died: 2 September 1844 (aged 73); Rome, Papal States
- Education: Domenico Corvi
- Known for: Historical and religious painting
- Notable work: The Death of Julius Caesar (1798); Ptolemy II Philadelphus in the Library of Alexandria (1813)
- Movement: Neoclassicism
- Spouses: Maddalena Bracci Devoti (m. 1816; died 1825) Bianca Luisa Emilia Allier (m. 1831)

Signature
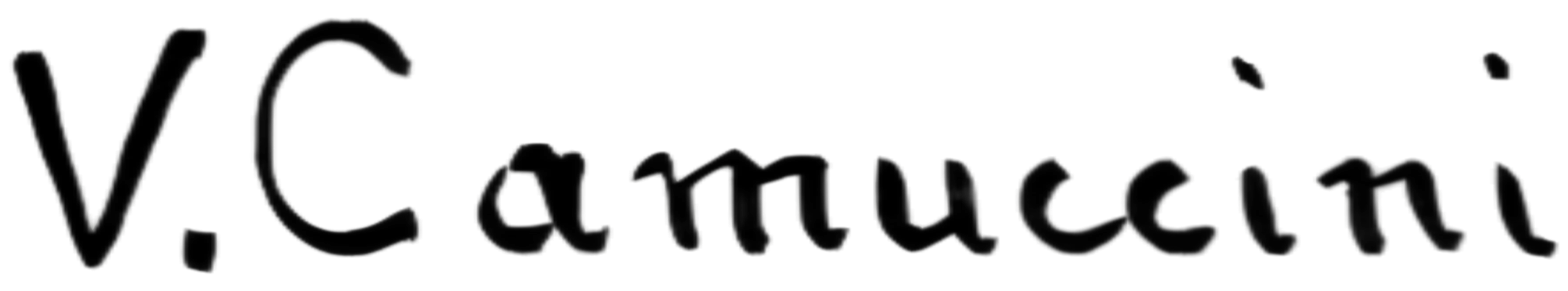

Vincenzo Camuccini (22 February 1771 – 2 September 1844) was an Italian Neoclassical painter. He was considered the premier academic painter of his time in Rome. Camuccini was known for his sober grandeur and archeological accuracy.

== Biography ==
=== Early life and education ===
Camuccini was born in Rome on 22 February 1771. His father, Giovanni Battista, was a coal dealer of Ligurian origin. He received his first education from his brother Pietro, a picture-restorer, and Pietro Leone Bombelli, an engraver. His brother Pietro gave up his place in the studio of Domenico Corvi to Vincenzo. To this period can be assigned Camuccini's painting of The Sacrifice of Noah, reputed to have been his earliest original composition. The painting showcases Camuccini's early mastery of chiaroscuro.

After leaving Corvi's studio, Camuccini resumed an independent program of training under the supervision of his older brother Pietro. Pietro's taste and artistic interests influenced Vincenzo, who first came across the works of earlier masters, notably Poussin, through engravings collected by Pietro. During this period, Camuccini undertook an exhaustive investigation of antique sculpture and Old Master paintings, copying works of the Renaissance, the Seicento and Batoni.

According to his own account, he spent three years (1787–89) studying the Vatican frescoes of Michelangelo and Raphael, and his fascination with them endured throughout his career. Camuccini, more than any other Italian neoclassical artist, was influenced by Raphael and published in 1806-07 a volume of drawings after Raphael's Transfiguration.

=== Early career ===
At the beginning of his career, Camuccini made a name for himself making copies after Renaissance masters for a clientele of wealthy noblemen, both Italian and foreign. By 1789 he was acclaimed for his painting Christ Carried to the Tomb, copied from Raphael and commissioned by Lord Bristol. During the 1790s he became acquainted with other young artists, most notably Pietro Benvenuti, Giuseppe Bossi, and Luigi Sabatelli, who were to lead the Neoclassical movement in Tuscany and Lombardy. Together they created an informal academy, using Camuccini's house as a studio, where they shared in studies of anatomy and models for life drawing, and held competitions on mutually set themes.

=== Mature works ===
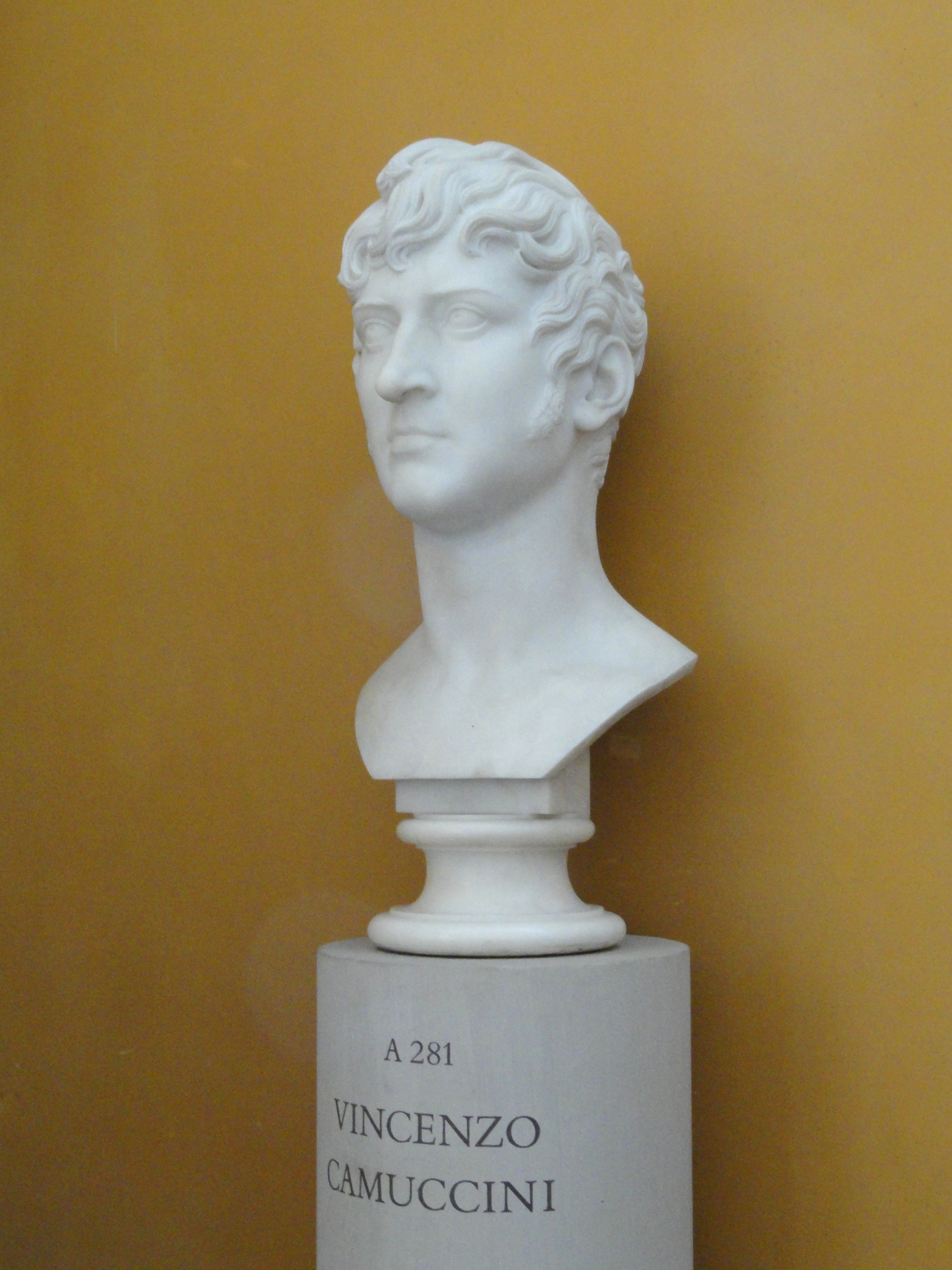
Bust of Vincenzo Camuccini by Bertel Thorvaldsen, Thorvaldsen Museum, Copenhagen

As an original painter, Camuccini belongs to the Neoclassicist school fostered in Rome by Pompeo Batoni, Anton Raphael Mengs and Angelica Kauffman. Other important sources of inspiration were Winckelmann’s writings on the ancient art and Neoclassical works by such foreign artists resident in Rome as Gavin Hamilton. From Mengs, Camuccini learned the principle of eclecticism and from Winckelmann the criterion of moral uplift in simplicity and grandeur of style.

Camuccini's public stature was established with the Death of Julius Caesar and the Death of Virginia, commissioned in 1793 by Frederick Hervey, Earl of Bristol and Bishop of Derry (who had previously ordered copies of Old Master paintings from Camuccini). He worked scrupulously on these paintings and was strongly influenced by the ideas of Winckelmann and Mengs, focusing on a more rigorous attitude toward Antiquity. For example, he spent three years preparing the cartoon for the Death of Julius Caesar, searching for antique models and consulting with leading archaeologists such as Ennio Quirino Visconti.

The subject of the two paintings was highly topical, giving full expression to Roman Republican ideals. This led to the assessment that Camuccini may have been influenced by Jacques-Louis David's classic Roman themes and style; but it is more likely both were emerging from the rising Neoclassic refocus towards images of and derived from Greco-Roman themes.

The success of these works established his reputation in Rome and abroad. In 1796, he began his association with the Borghese family by illustrating a catalogue of their antique sculpture collection. Shortly afterwards, Prince Marcantonio Borghese commissioned him to fresco the five vault panels of the Stanza di Elena e Paride in the Villa Borghese, Rome. In 1802 Camuccini became a member of the Accademia di San Luca and in 1803 he was nominated by Pope Pius VII Director of the mosaic workshop at St. Peter's. For the Basilica he executed a mosaic of the Incredulity of Thomas (1806–1822).

In 1806, Gaspare Landi received a commission for two large canvases for the chapel of the Madonna of the Rosary in the church of San Giovanni in Piacenza. Ultimately, the commission was split with Camuccini who painted a Presentation in the Temple. The canvases by the two artists were completed in the early spring of 1806, and were exhibited side by side at the Pantheon at Easter of that year. In this period Camuccini also painted a Betrothal of Psyche, and, jointly with Landi, he frescoed the ceiling of the Palazzo Torlonia.

In 1810, Camuccini traveled to Paris, where he encountered David, as well as Gros, Gericault and Jean-Baptiste Regnault, and was presented to the Emperor, who greatly appreciated his work. Several Napoleonic commissions followed, including the famous canvas painting Ptolemy II Philadelphus in the Library of Alexandria. Upon his return to Rome, he was commissioned in 1811, together with his rival Gaspare Landi, to head the group of Italian painters selected to decorate the Quirinal Palace for Napoleon's visit (he executed two paintings in the Emperor's apartments).

In the following years he was appointed to a number of important posts: in 1809 he was named Superintendent of the Vatican Picture Galleries and in 1814 Superintendent of the Apostolic Palaces. That same year he became Inspector of Public Paintings for Rome and the Papal States. He assumed the presidency of the Accademia di San Luca from 1805 to 1810, and again after the death of Canova, from 1823 to 1827. In 1820 he became a member of the Institut de France and in 1825 he was appointed director of the Neapolitan Academy of Rome. Pope Pius VII conferred upon him the title of Baron, with hereditary succession, and the Emperor Francis I the order of the Iron Crown. In 1829, he was elected as an Honorary member of the National Academy of Design.

=== Portraits ===
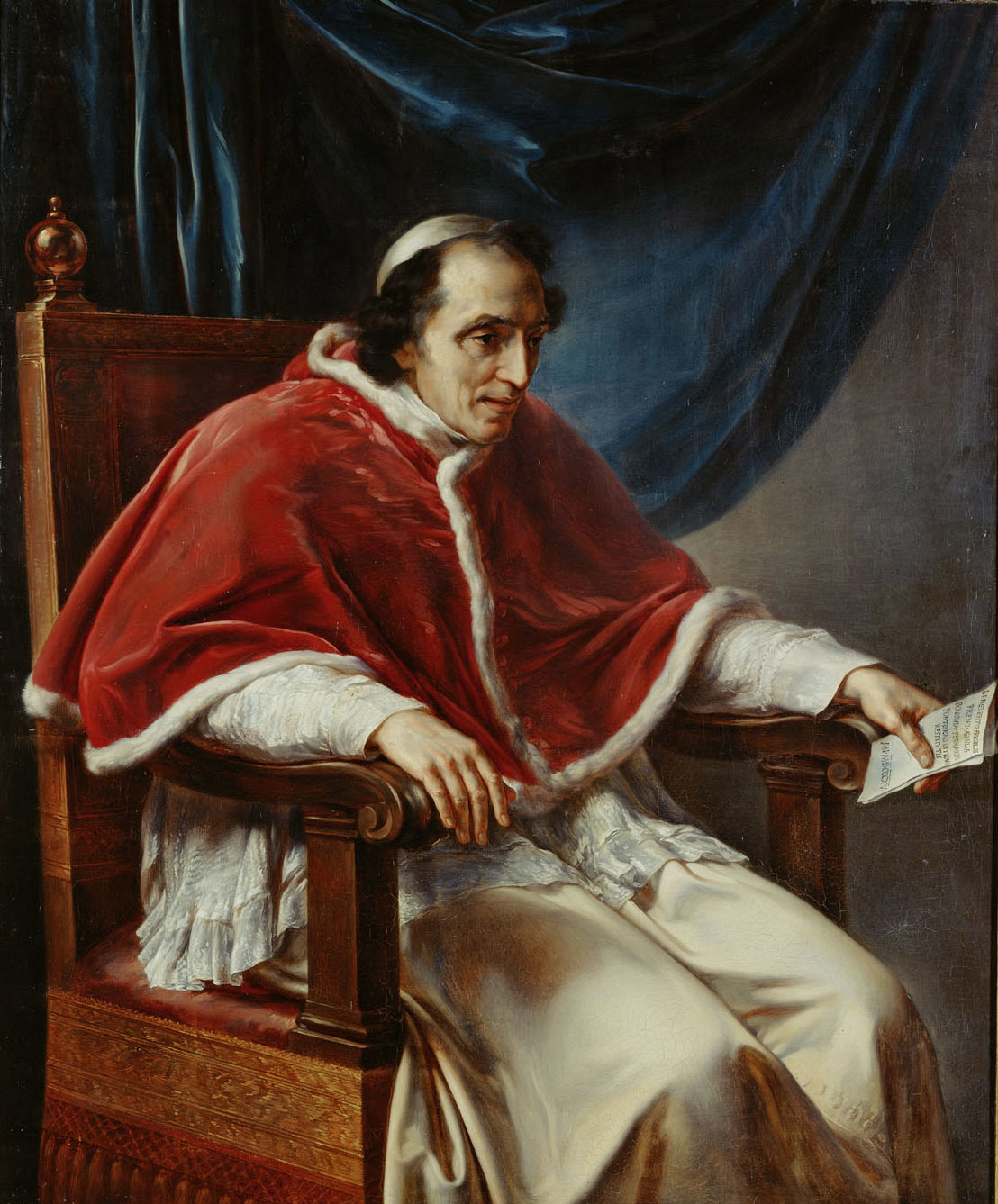
Portrait of Pope Pius VII, Kunsthistorisches Museum, Vienna

Camuccini attained considerable eminence as a portrait painter. Among his clients were many members of the House of Bourbon – Ferdinand I, and Francis I of the Two Sicilies, Charles IV of Spain, the Duke Charles Louis, and the Duchess Maria Luisa of Lucca, as well as Francis I of Austria, Grand Duke Alexander of Russia, and Charles Albert of Sardinia. Camuccini also worked for Napoleon, Joachim Murat, and for many princely Roman families, church dignitaries, and members of the foreign nobility in Rome.

Among the best portraits he produced are those of Pope Pius VII (now in the Gallery at Vienna); the Comte de Blacas, Ambassador from France to the Holy See; the King and the Queen of Naples; The Countess Ykaterina Petrovna Schuvalova (c. 1815; St. Petersburg, Hermitage inv. 5264); and the Princess Alexandra von Dietrichstein (exhibited Academy of Prague, May 1829).

=== Later life ===
After the fall of Napoleon, Camuccini devoted himself almost wholly to religious painting. Several of his later works were engraved by Pietro Bettelini, and some were lithographed by Giovanni Scudellari, and published under the title of I Fasti principali della Vita di Gesù Cristo, with text in Italian and French at Rome, in 1829. On February 18, 1842, Camuccini suffered a stroke that left him paralyzed on his left side and unable to paint. His last work, which he was transferring to canvas at the time, was a composition representing Amadeus IX, Duke of Savoy commissioned by the Queen Regent of Spain, Maria Christina of the Two Sicilies. He died at Rome on 2 September 1844. Among his many pupils and followers were Constantino Brumidi, Giovanni Battista Biscarra, Francesco Podesti and Salvatore Lo Forte. Camuccini's son Giovanni Battista became known for his romantic landscape painting.

=== Art collection ===
Camuccini expended no small portion of his wealth in the purchase of a fine collection of objects of art. In 1856, the greater portion of the pictures, upwards of seventy in number, were purchased being bought by the duke of Northumberland, who removed them to Alnwick Castle. They consist principally of the works of the Italian masters living in the 16th and 17th centuries, with some specimens of an earlier date, and a few others of the Dutch and Flemish painters of the 17th century. His collection included the Madonna of the Pinks, a devotional painting usually attributed to Italian Renaissance master Raphael.

== Legacy ==
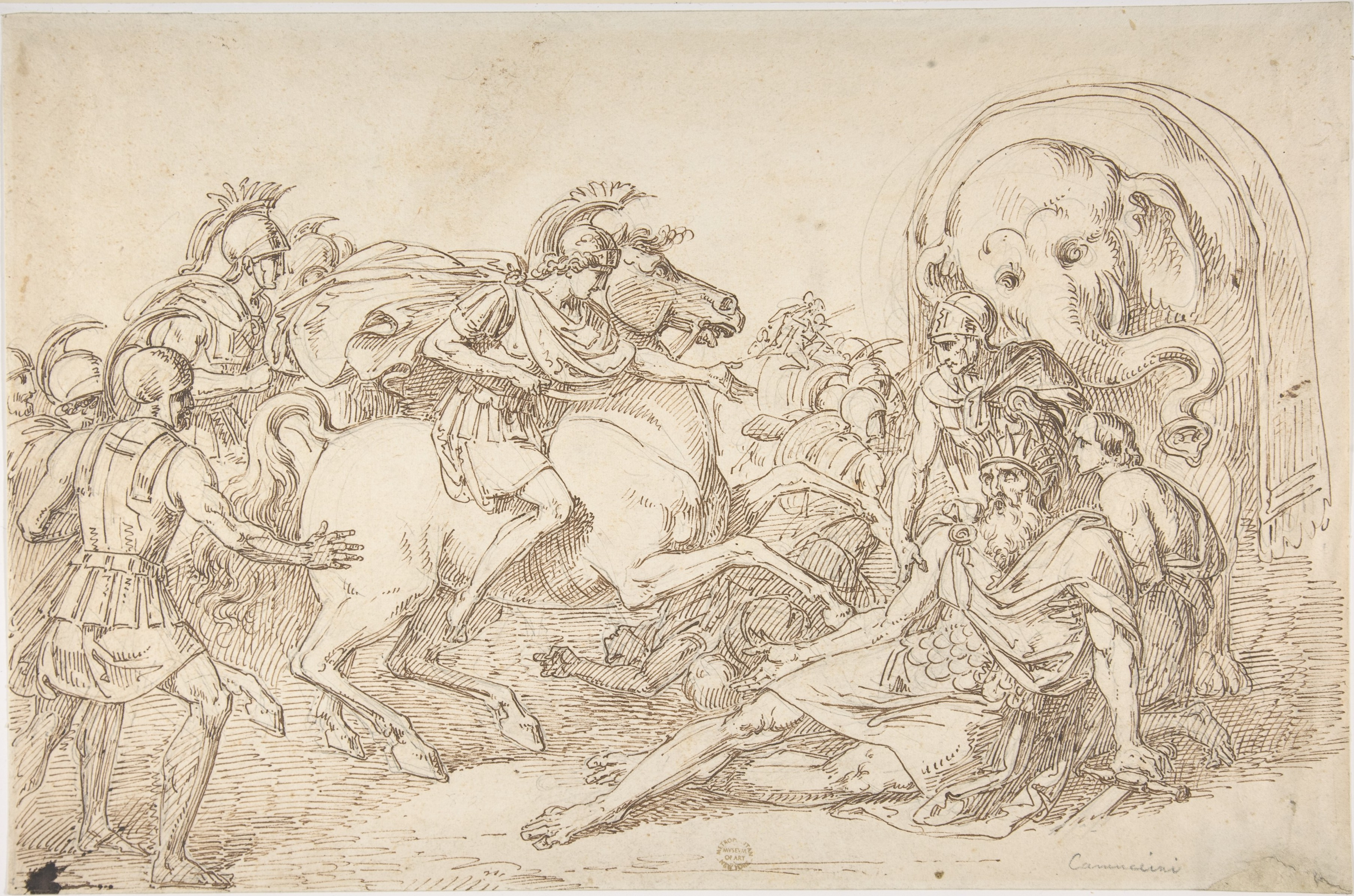
Alexander and Porus, pen and brown ink over graphite, Met, New York

According to Ulrick Hiesinger, 'Camuccini's talents as a painter and his official positions in the Papal Government, made him, after Canova, the most influential artist in Rome during the early decades of the 19th century.'

His paintings are mostly history pictures (mostly scenes from Greek and Roman history), and compositionally, they are conceived as reliefs, like sculpture, with the movement running across the picture plane, not into depth. Interestingly, he also painted religious subjects, but these are more in a neo-Bolognese, than in a neoclassical style. Camuccini's œuvre shows a great cansistency of style, although in his late years he developed a preference for more baroque, diagonal compositions and freer brushstrokes.

Camuccini exhibited an extraordinary fluency and independence of style, which is evident in his numerous drawings and sketches. His drawings were highly valued by his contemporaries, and a number of artists – including John Flaxman, Giuseppe Bossi and Louis Gauffier – owned some of his studies.

In the last decade of his life, his staunch Neoclassicism was attacked by exponents of Romanticism. Some of his disciples, such as Tommaso Minardi, broke away from their teacher's academic style for a more accentuated naturalism. Celebrated during his lifetime, by the late 1800s Camuccini had fallen into oblivion. It has only been in recent years that he has been recognized as a major figure in the Italian Neoclassical tradition.

== Selected works ==
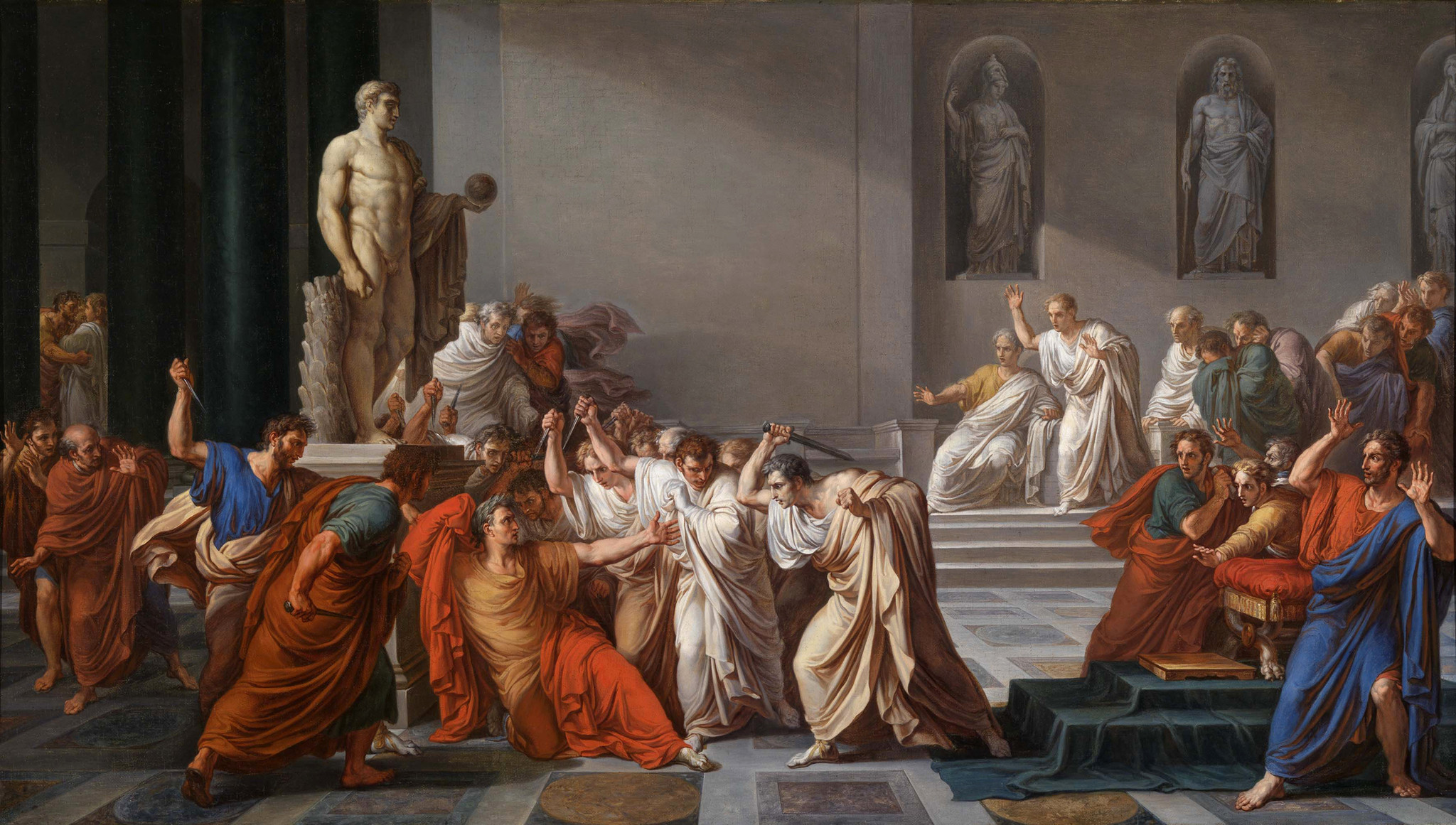
The Death of Julius Caesar (1798), Galleria Nazionale d'Arte Moderna

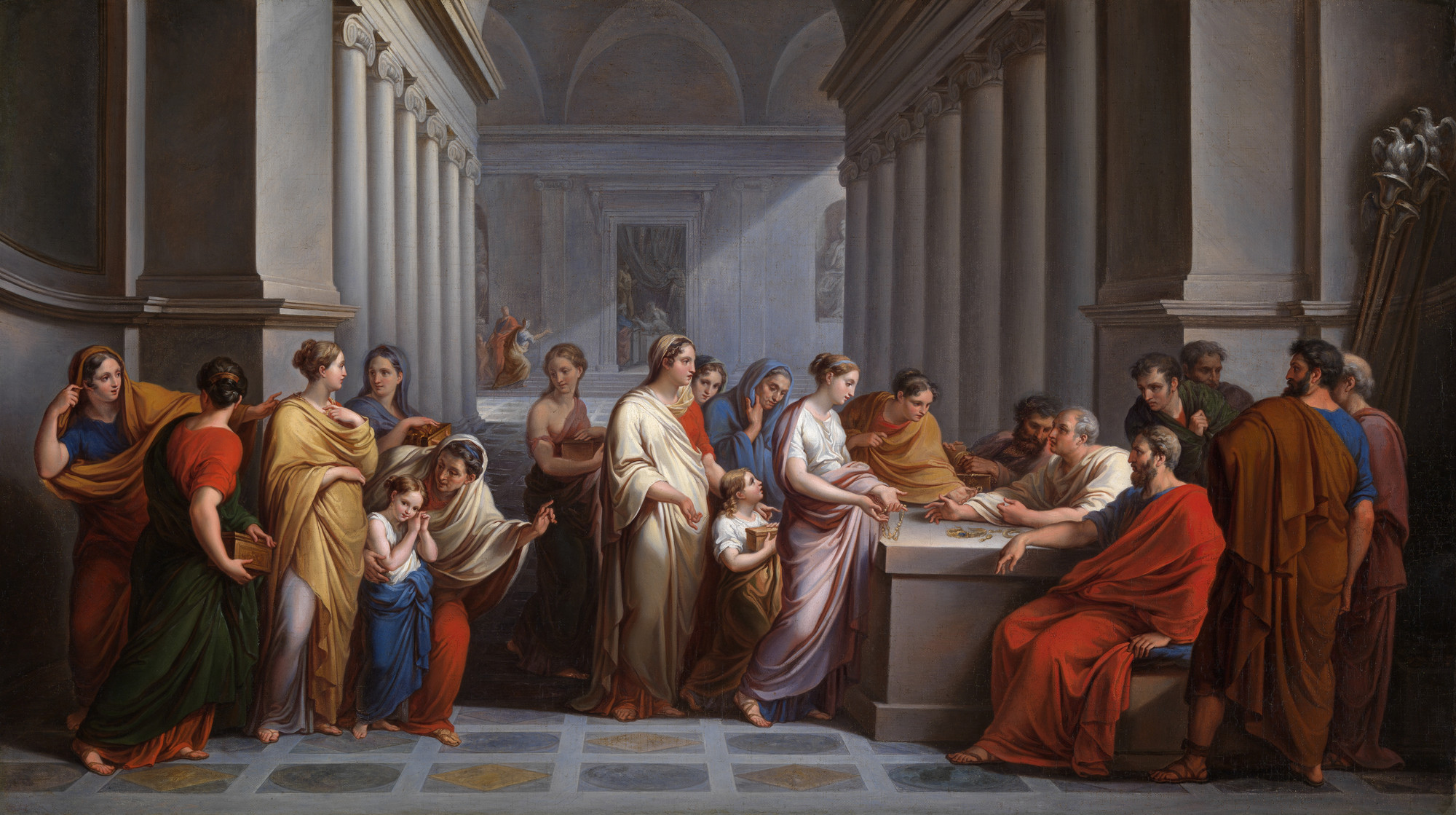
Roman Women Offering Their Jewellery in Defence of the State (1825–1829), Kelvingrove Art Gallery and Museum

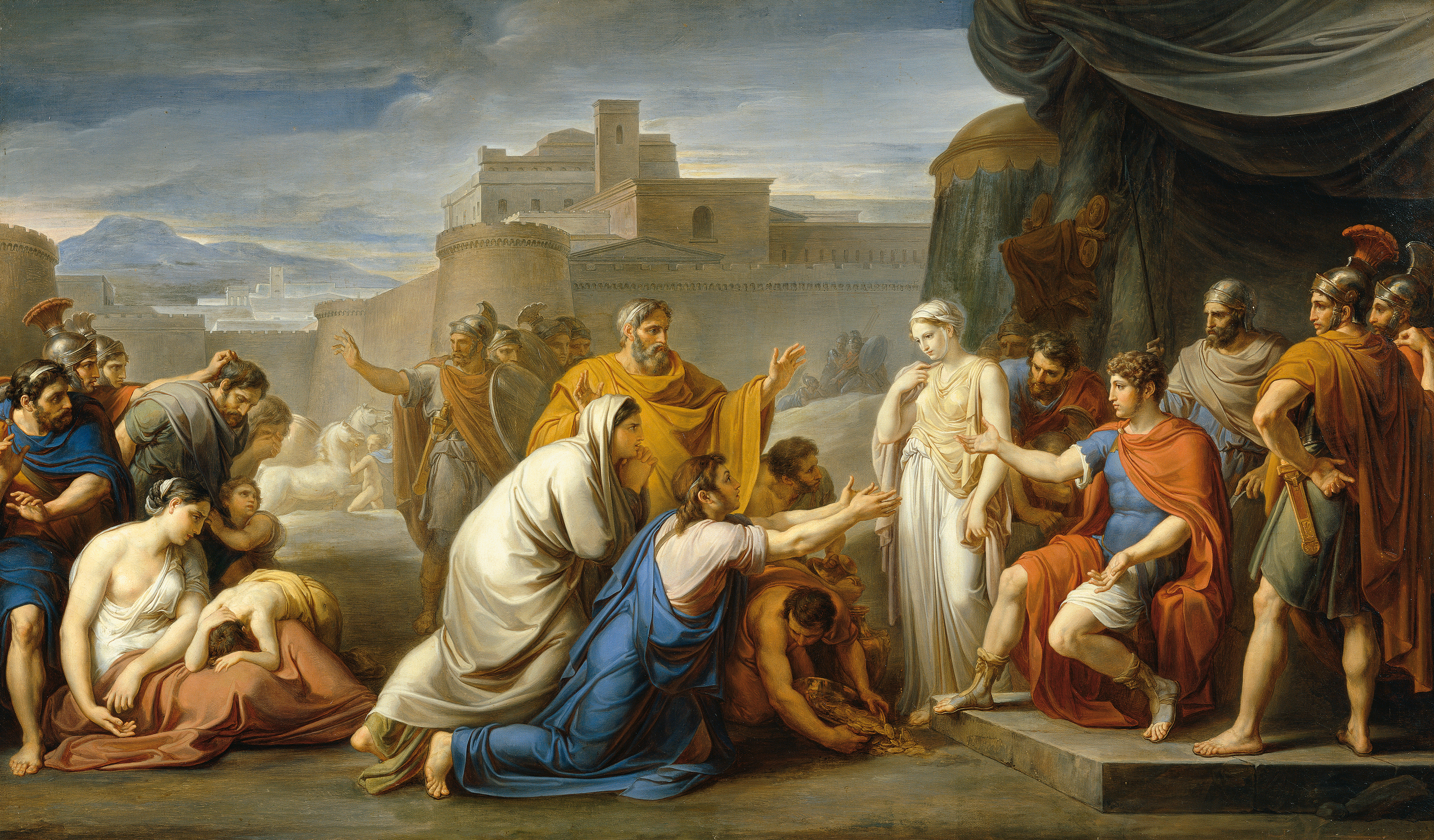
Scipio's moderation (1808–1811), Kunsthistorisches Museum

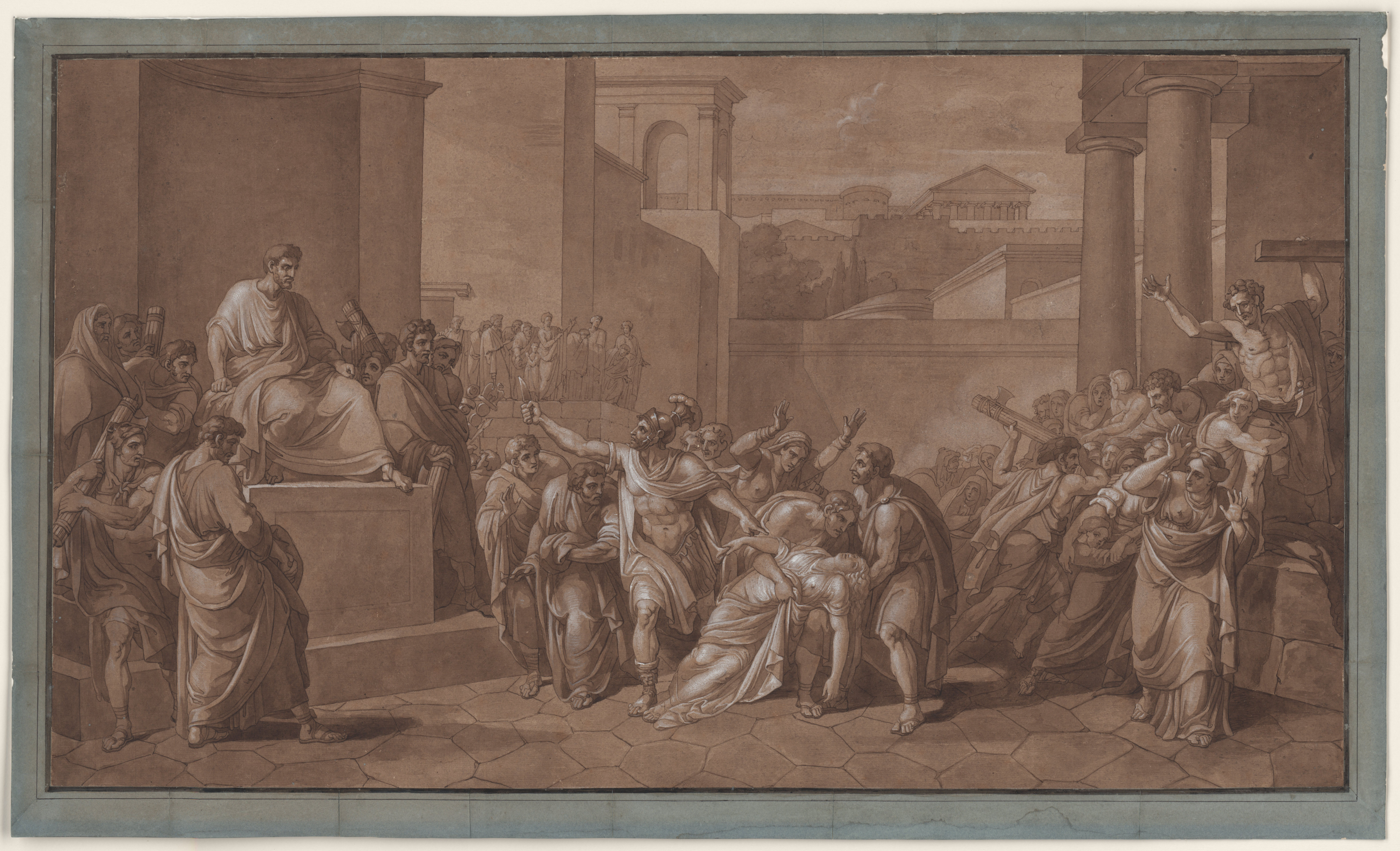
Cartoon for the Death of Virginia (1798), Rijksmuseum, Amsterdam

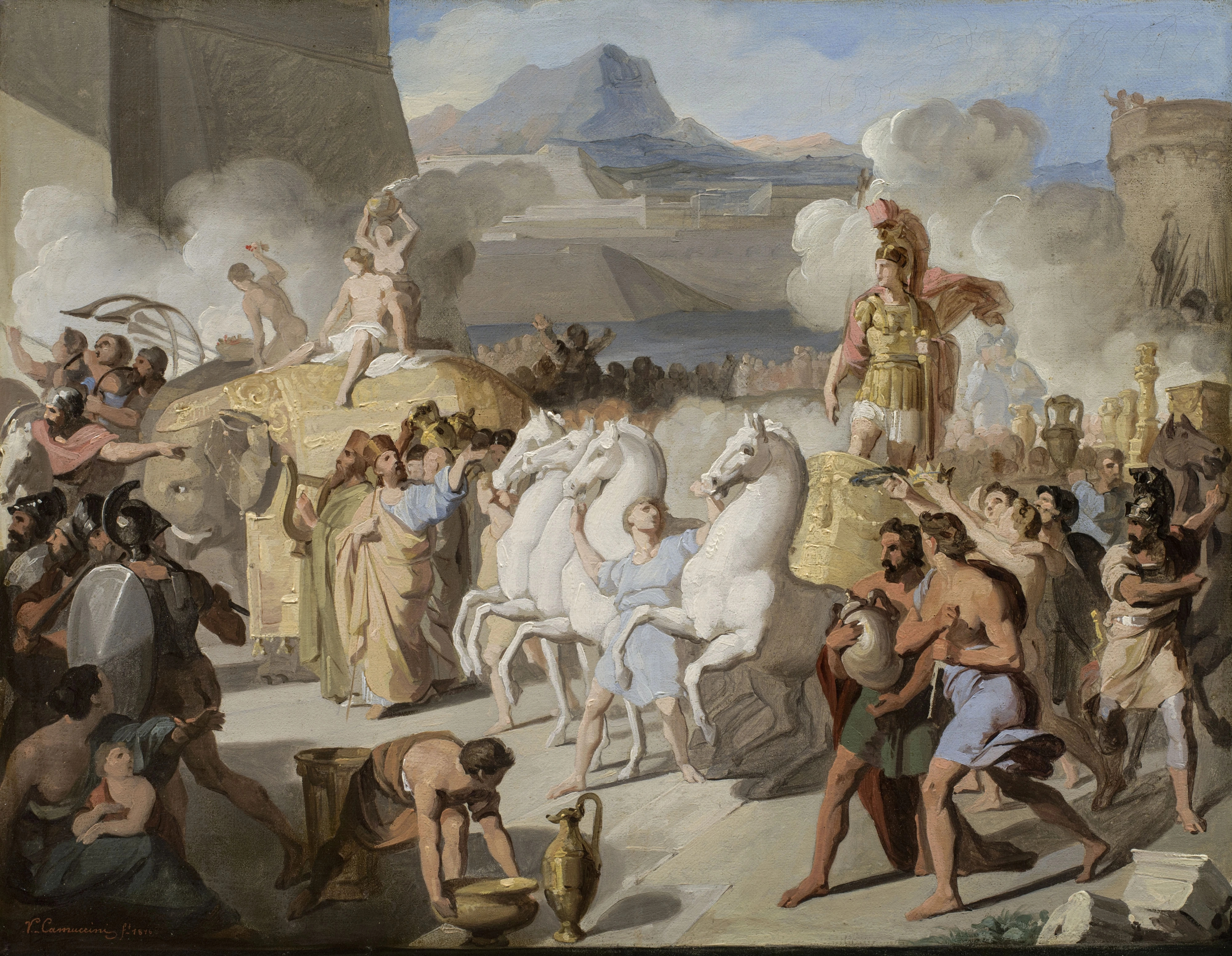
A Roman Triumphal Entry (1816), Private collection

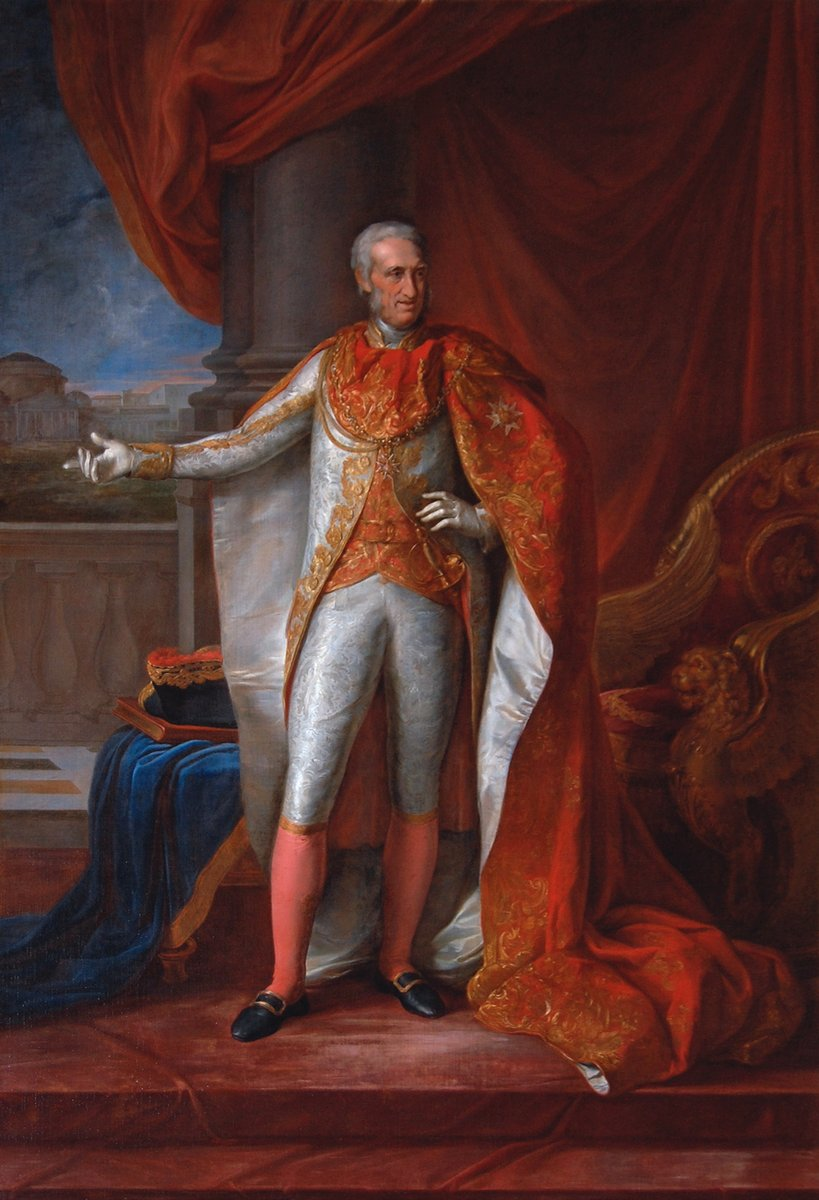
Portrait of Ferdinand I of the Two Sicilies (1819)

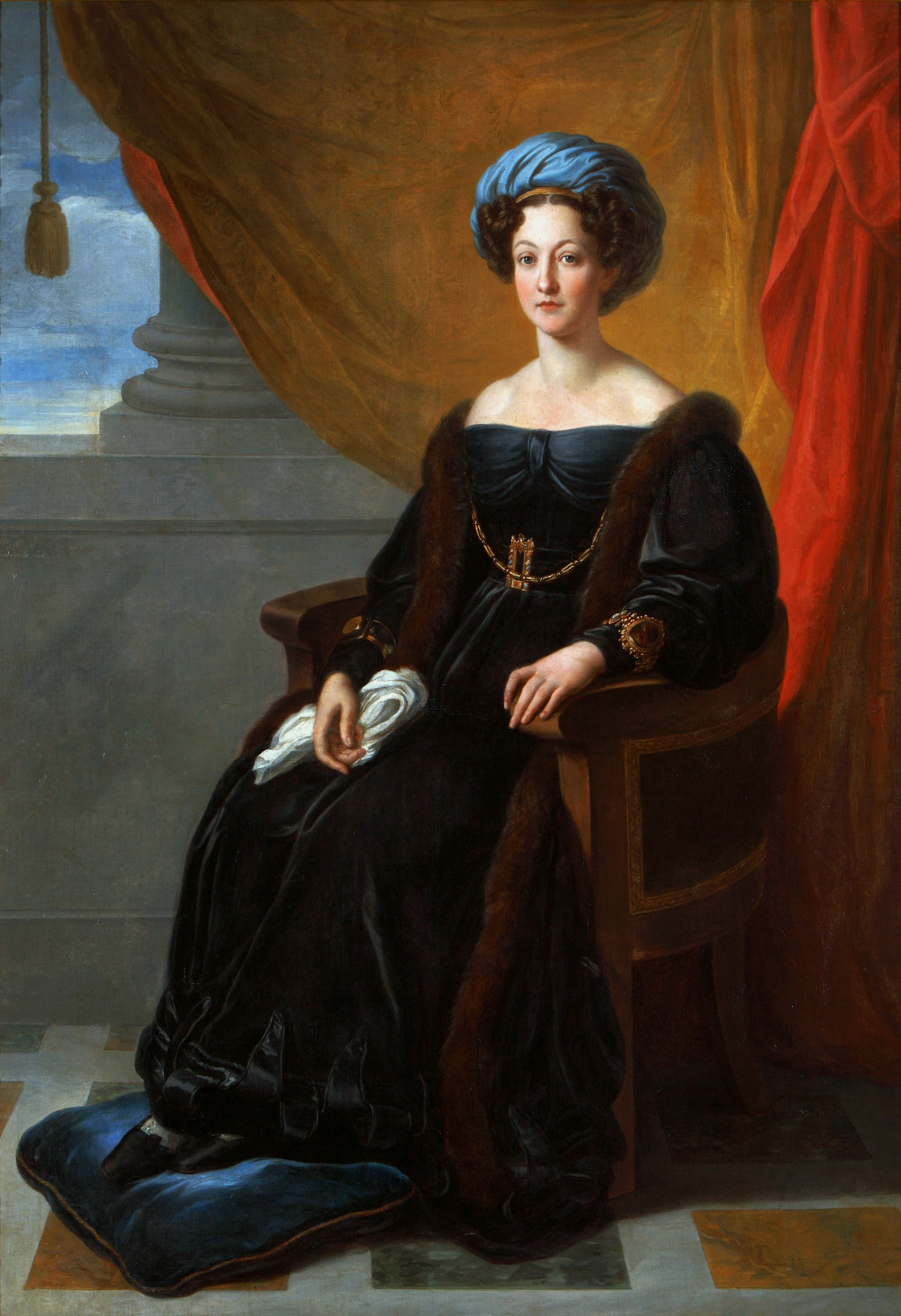
Portrait of Klementyna Ostrowska née Sanguszko (1822), Tarnów District Museum

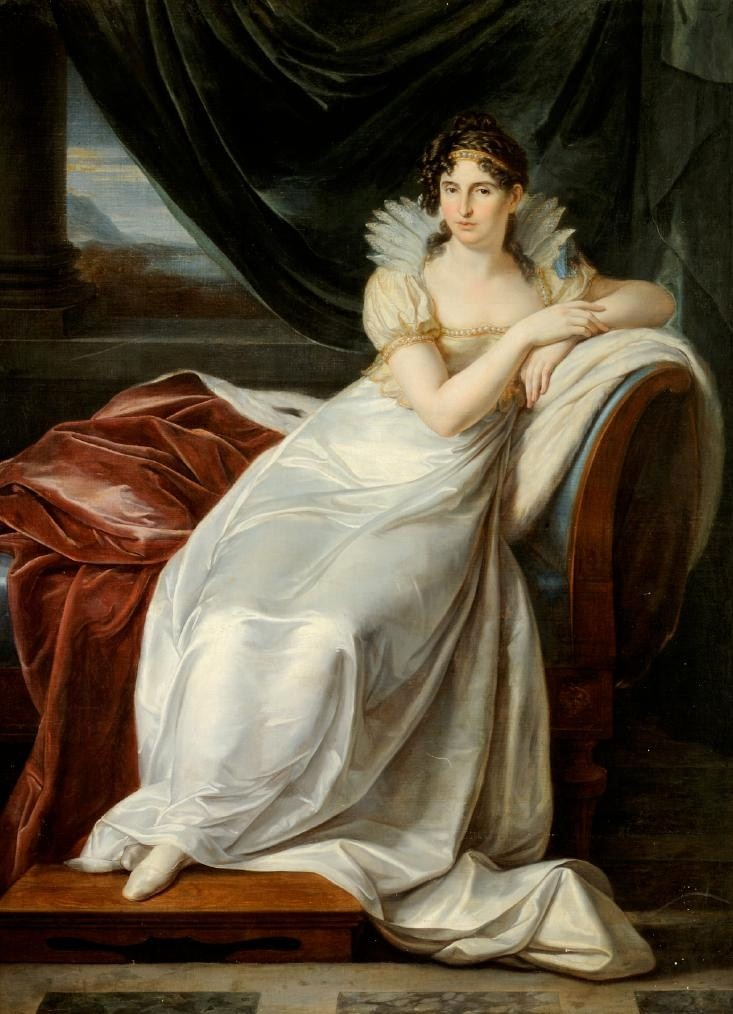
Portrait of Princess Alexandra Andreevna Dietrichstein (1800)

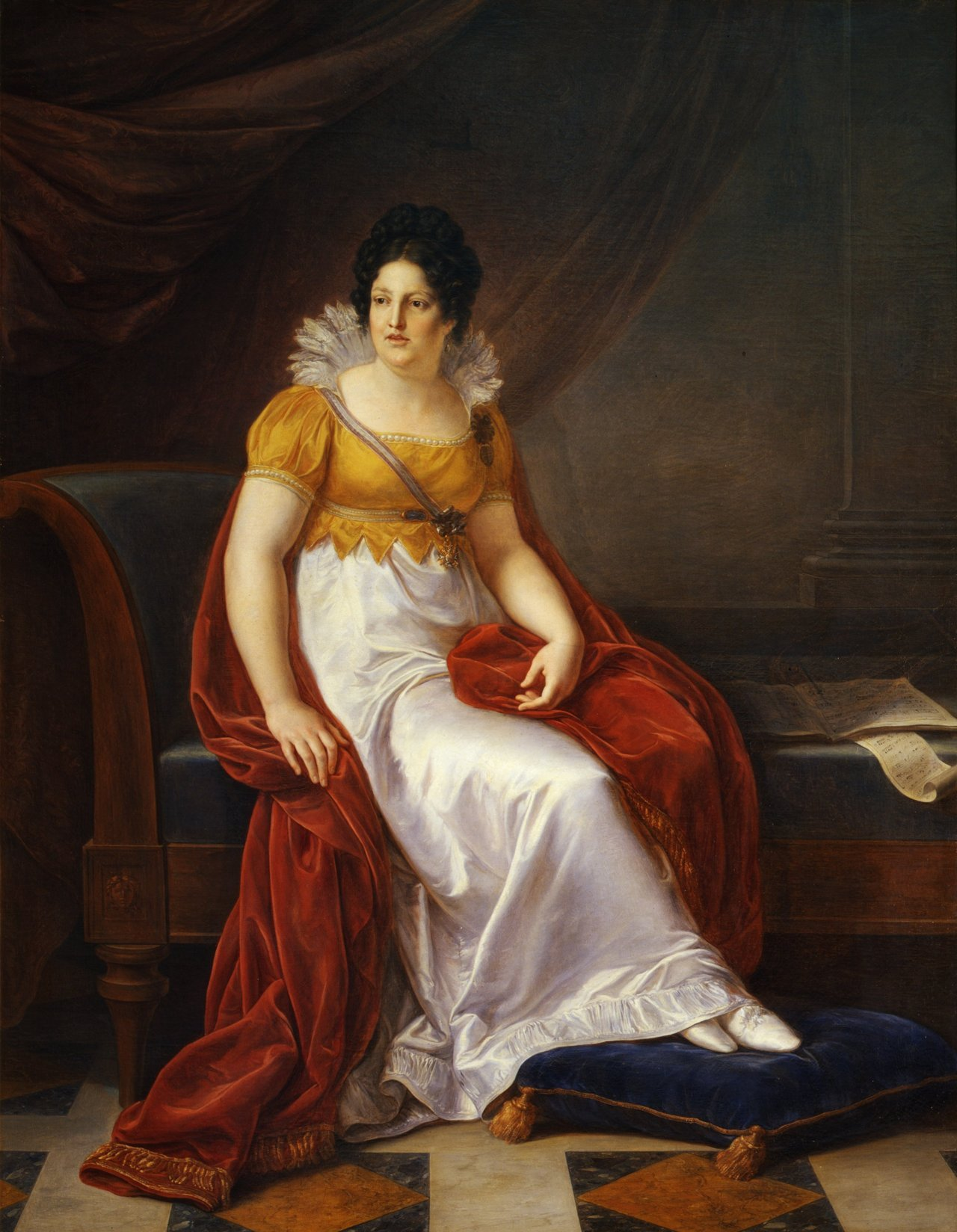
Portrait of Maria Luisa of Spain, duchess of Lucca (1810–1811), Palazzo Pitti, Florence

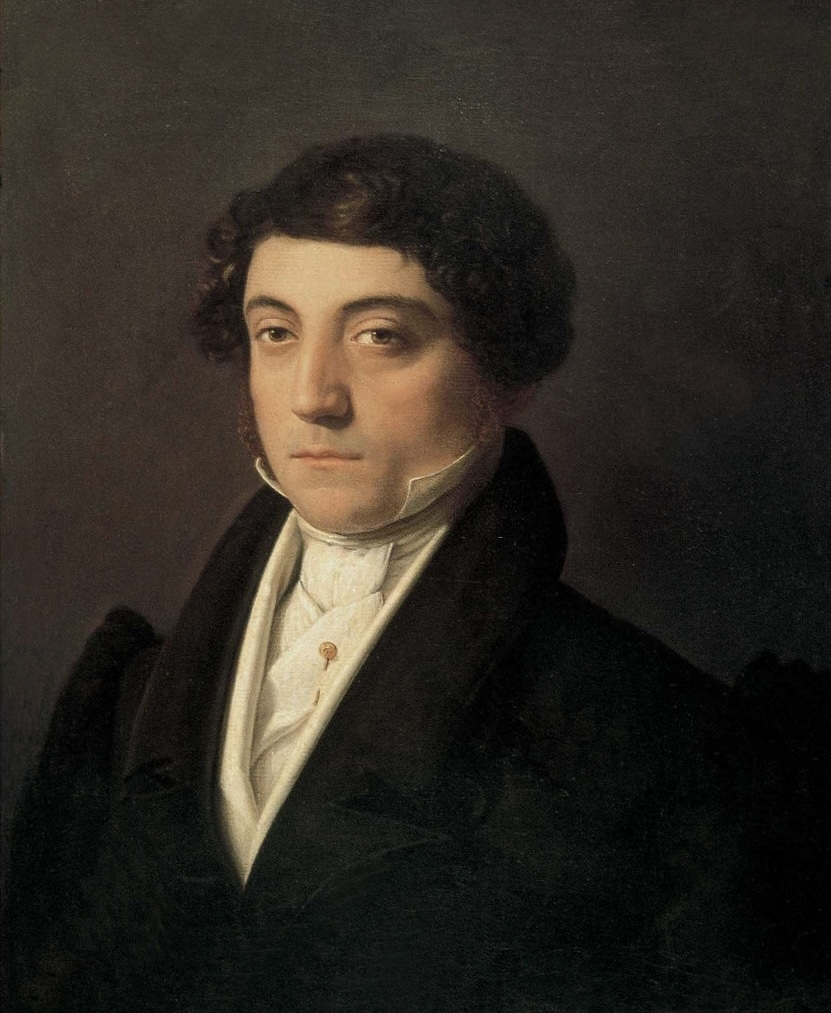
Portrait of Gioacchino Rossini, (c. 1810), Museo del Teatro alla Scala

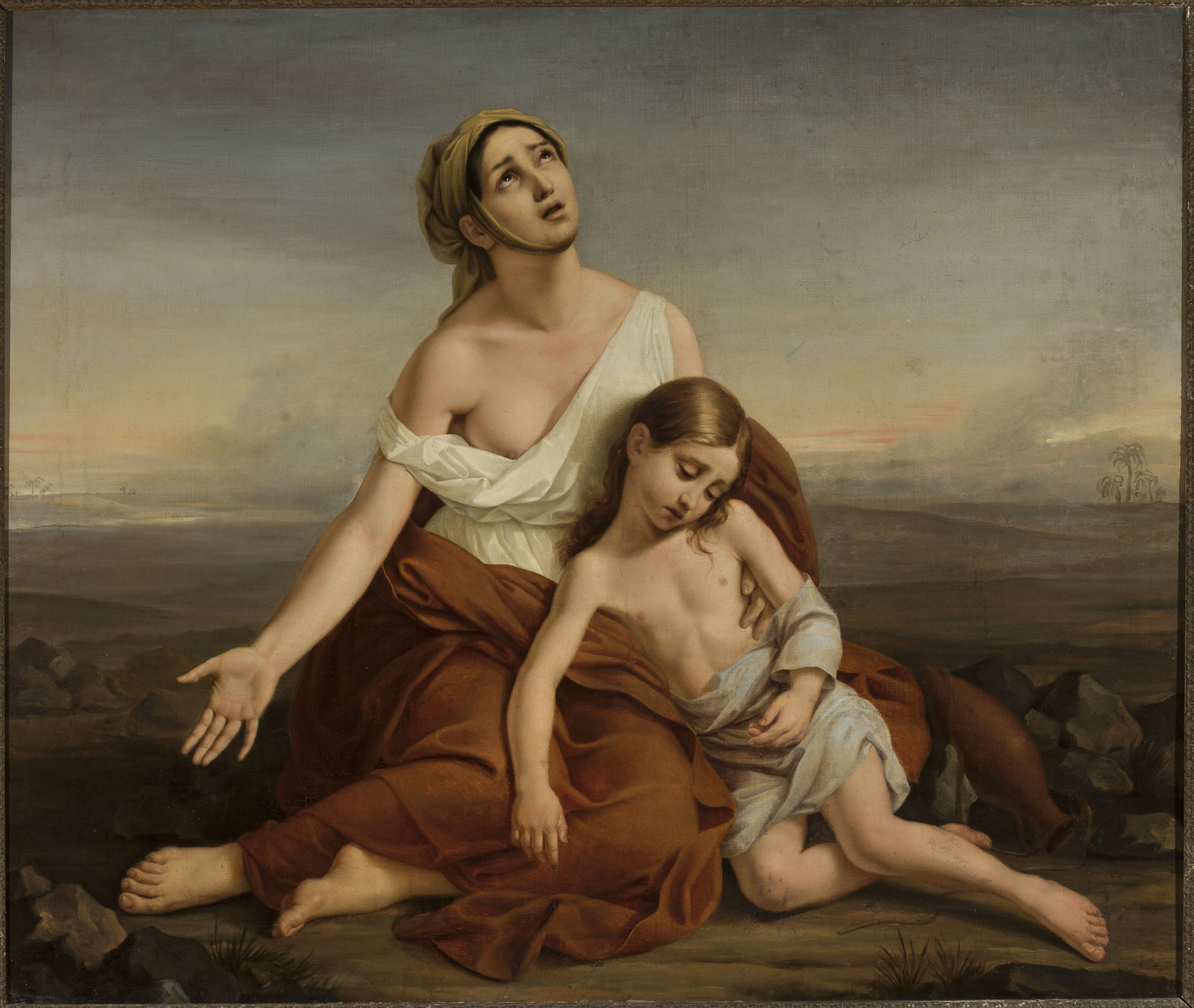
Hagar in the desert (1817), National Museum in Warsaw

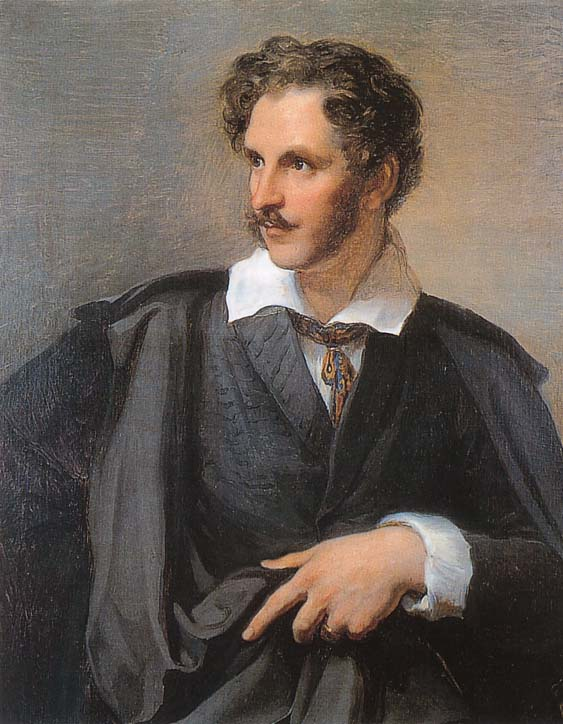
Portrait of August Grahl, priv. col.
