= Domenico Corvi =

Italian painter (1721–1803)

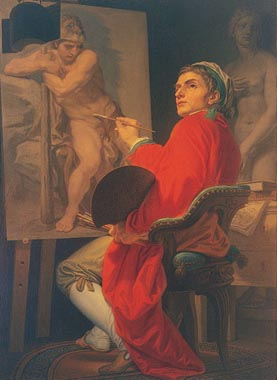
Self-Portrait, Uffizi

Domenico Corvi (16 September 1721 – 22 July 1803) was an Italian painter at the close of the 18th century, active in an early Neoclassic style in Rome and surrounding sites.

== Biography ==
=== Early life and education ===
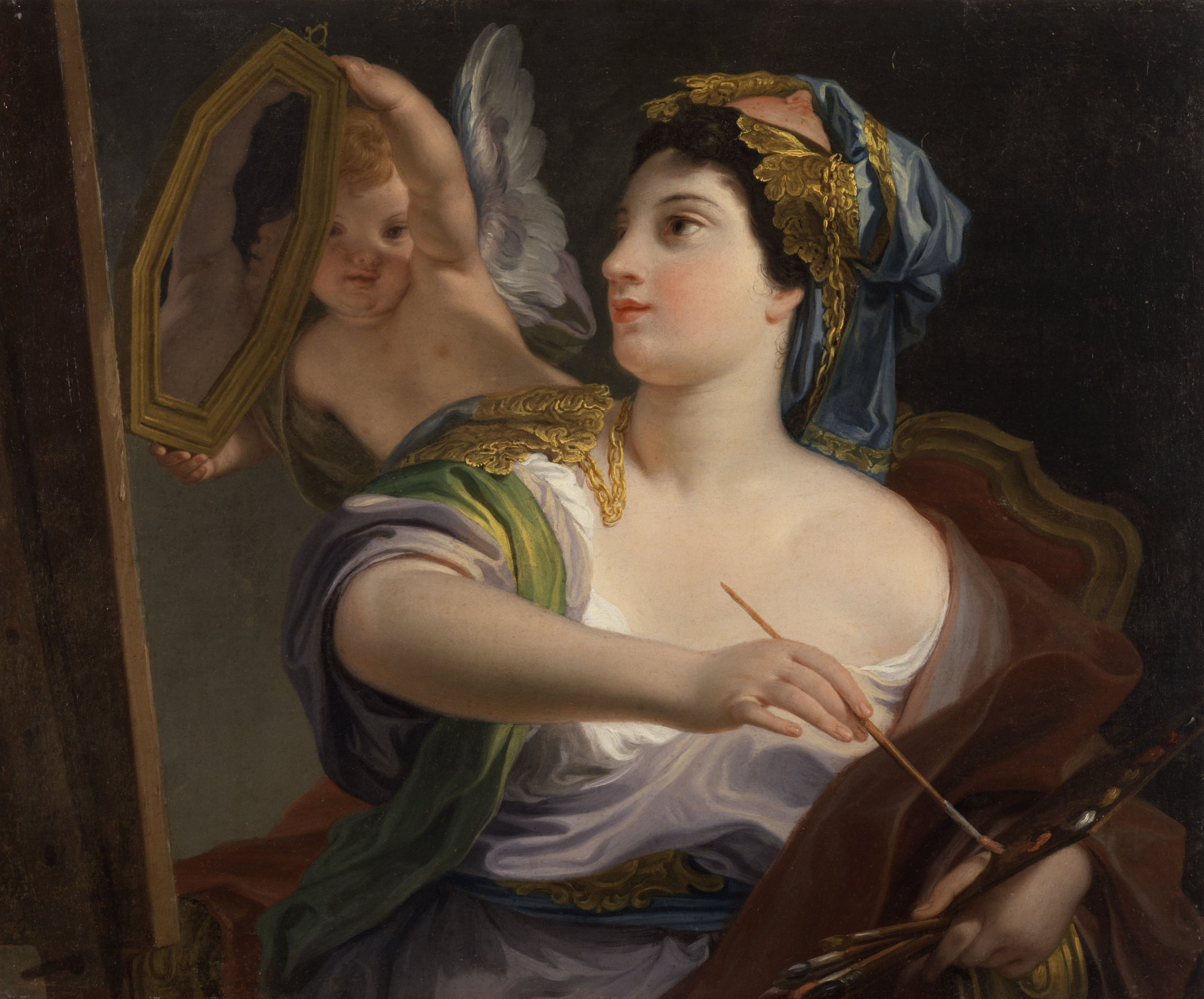
Allegory of Painting

Corvi was born in Viterbo. After some early works in Viterbo and Palestrina, Corvi moved on to Rome to work under Francesco Mancini, working in a Roman milieu where late-Rococo of Pompeo Batoni and the incipient Neoclassicism of Anton Raphael Mengs coexisted, and fashioned a style in between. In 1750 he won first prize at the Accademia di San Luca, to which he was elected a full member in 1756 when, probably, he submitted his Nativity, in which the atmospheric light and tender emotions illustrate Corrado Giaquinto’s early influence. Also in 1756 Corvi returned to his native Viterbo to take part in the decoration of the church of the Gonfalone, in collaboration with Vincenzo Strigelli (1713–69) and Anton Angelo Falaschi. Corvi contributed two roundels of the apostles Saints Simon and Jude and the scene of the Beheading of Saint John the Baptist. His early career was otherwise largely devoted to the decoration of churches in and around Rome.

=== Career ===
His first major set of independent works in Rome were a series of canvases completed in 1758 and currently in Vedana, commissioned by Cardinal Domenico Amedeo Orsini and including the altarpiece of Saint Michael Archangel for the church of Trinità dei Monti. Corvi's style combines Baroque elements of light and colour (hence the previous attribution of this cycle to Sebastiano Ricci) with more classical elements of composition, indicative of the growing influence of Pompeo Batoni. This combination is again apparent in the Sacrifice of Isaac and the Finding of Moses (both 1762). From 1764 to 1780 Corvi, at the height of his career, began to work increasingly for private patrons. In the Palazzo Barberini, Rome, he worked on a cycle glorifying the Colonna family, executing two scenes from the Life of the Blessed Margherita Colonna and two subjects from Venetian history. This commission led to two more works recording Venetian history, which completed the decoration of San Marco, Rome.

In 1766 Corvi was in Turin to paint Victor Amadeus I, Duke of Savoy, Expelling the Plague with the Lamp of the Madonna delle Grazie in 1630 (Turin, San Domenico). The success of this work led to the commission to decorate the Palazzo Doria Pamphilj, Rome, in celebration of Andrea Doria's marriage to Princess Leopoldina of Savoy, with a huge fresco of David and Abigail and a ceiling painting of the Apotheosis of Andrea Doria, which now exists only as a bozzetto (Minneapolis Institute of Art).

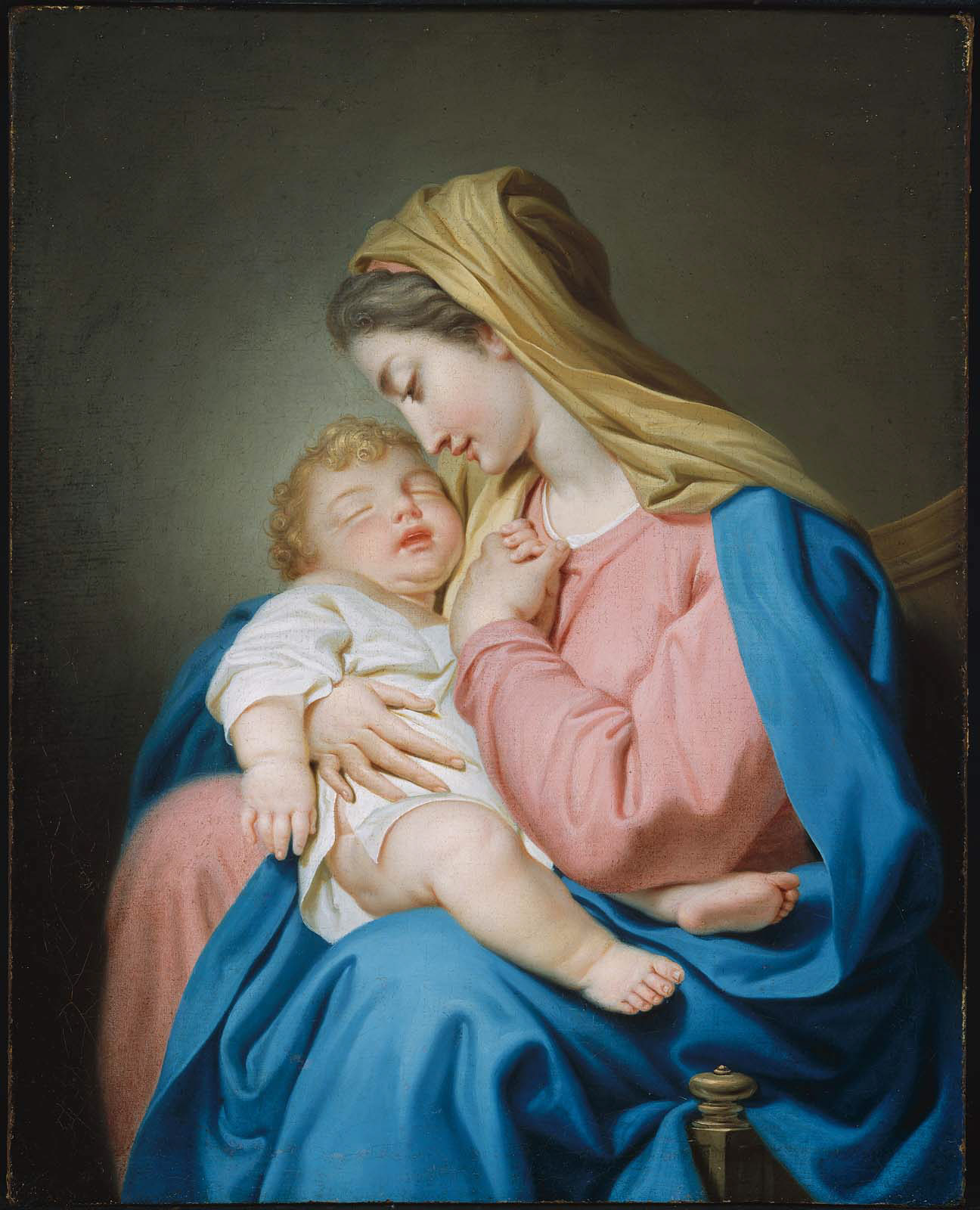
Virgin and Child, Museum of Fine Arts Boston

In 1767 Corvi painted The Miracle of Saint Joseph Calasanz Resuscitating a Child (in a Church at Frascati) for the order of Piarists (Scolopi); the painting was made to commemorate the canonization of the saint on July 16, 1767, and is now in the Wadsworth Atheneum.

Corvi's greatest private patrons were the Borghese family, who employed him on a fixed salary for almost a decade. His first commission for them was the altarpiece showing Saint Leo IV Extinguishing the Fire in the Borgo (1768–9) for Santa Caterina da Siena a Via Giulia, Rome. In the Borghese Palace he painted a ceiling with the Sacrifice of Iphigenia (1772) and undertook the restoration of various existing works there. In the Villa Borghese he restored Giovanni Lanfranco’s frescoes and added two of his own, Dawn and Dusk. In 1774–5 he again worked as a restorer on the frescoes of the Capella Paolina in Santa Maria Maggiore.

During this period he also achieved considerable success as a painter of portraits and mythological scenes for such visitors to Rome as the renowned collector and bibliophile Prince Nikolay Yusupov, the Russian Minister in Turin, and Karl Joseph von Firmian, the Austrian Viceroy of Milan.

Corvi returned to ecclesiastical commissions with four large canvases: the Last Supper, the Coronation of the Virgin, the Incredulity of Saint Thomas and the Pentecost (all 1774–8) for the Cathedral of St. Ursus in Solothurn, Switzerland; these show an enhanced form of classicism.

=== Later years ===
After completing this exhausting work and making a short-lived return to the Borghese, Corvi, in his final phase, like his first, devoted himself to church decoration, but this time throughout Italy, from Ravenna to Pisa and from Venice to Spoleto. From the 1780s his style became increasingly pedantic; nonetheless, for most of the latter half of the century he was a major exponent of the Roman classical tradition. In the course of his career he held several important official positions in the Accademia di San Luca, and from 1757 was the director of the Scuola del Nudo at Campodoglio. He had a significant influence on his pupils, who included Giuseppe Cades, Francesco Alberi and Vincenzo Camuccini, encouraging them to assimilate the most graceful elements from a variety of sources. Corvi died in Rome in 1803.

== Bibliography ==
- Scavizzi, Giuseppe (1983). "CORVI, Domenico". Dizionario Biografico degli Italiani (in Italian). Vol. 29: Cordier–Corvo. Rome: Istituto dell'Enciclopedia Italiana. ISBN 978-88-12-00032-6.
- Eric Zafran, ed. (2004). Renaissance to Rococo; Masterpieces from the collection of the Wadsworth Atheneum Museum of Art. New Haven and London: Yale University Press. pp. 90–91.
