= San Silvestro, Viterbo =

Church building in Viterbo, Italy

Coordinates: 42.41579°N 12.10340°E

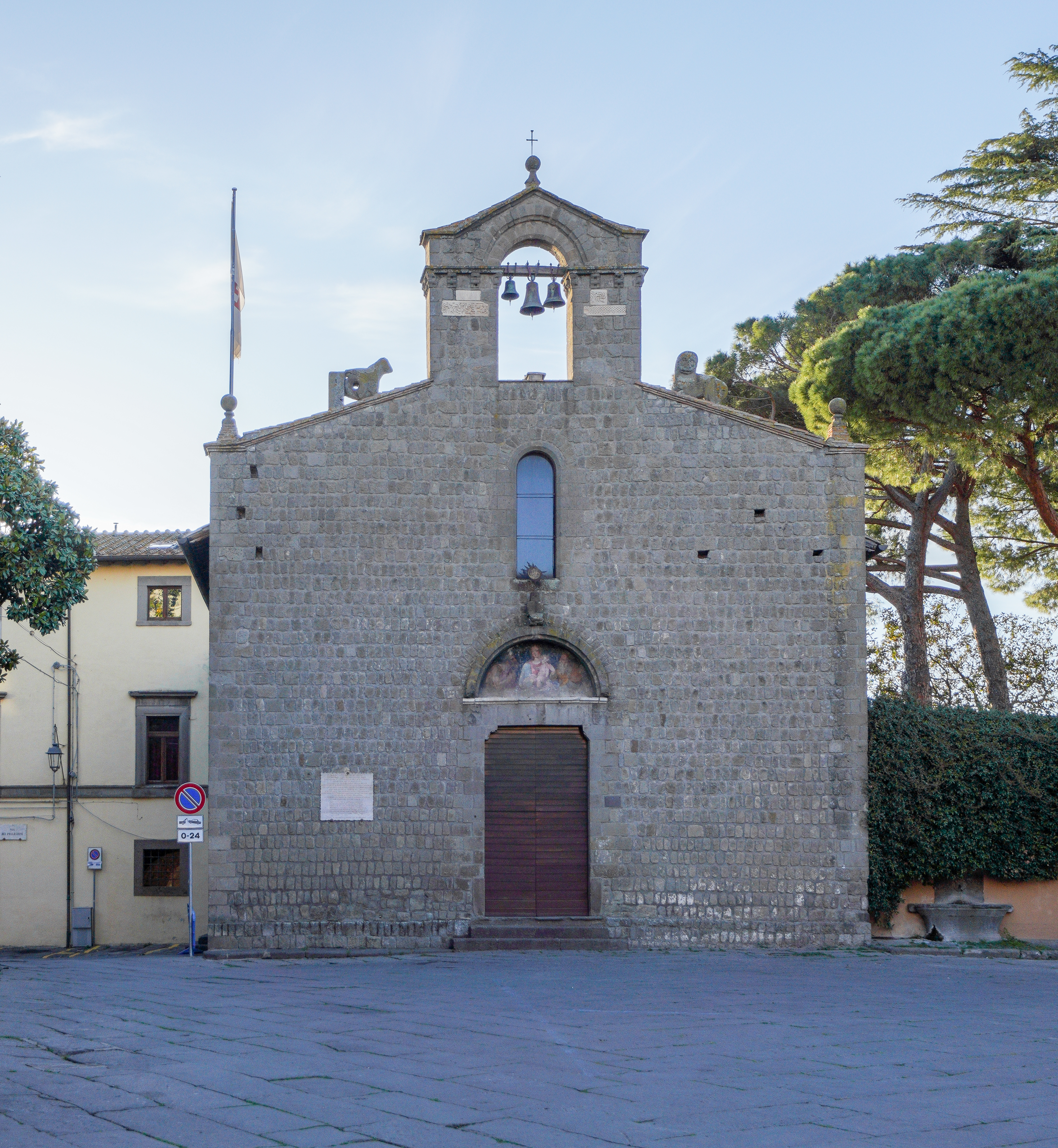
Facade of San Silvestro

San Silvestro is a Romanesque-style, Roman Catholic parish church located at the intersection of Via dei Pellegrini #23 with Piazza del Gesu, in Viterbo, region of Lazio, Italy. It is also known as Chiesa del Gesù, since it was previously administered by the Jesuits. The church is infamous for being the site of the murder of Henry of Almain (son of Richard, Earl of Cornwall) by his cousins Simon and Guy de Montfort: a murder occurring during a mass in 1271 attended by cardinals and kings.

== History ==
This church was built before what was previously called Piazza del Mercato, now Piazza del Gesù. The church is documented as early as 1080. The church has a flat stone facade with a sail-like campanile.

Initially this church was likely associated with the Silvestrine order, which founded by St Sylvester Gozzolini, canonized in 1598. But by 1622, the property briefly was assigned to the Jesuits recruited to Viterbo by Cardinal Scipione Cobelluzzi. During 1630–1640, it housed a group of Discalced Carmelites.

In 1643, the then Bishop Francesco Maria Brancaccio assigned the church to the Confraternity of the Holy Name of Jesus. The members of the confraternity wore red cloaks and cared for poor orphans. This confraternity adopted as their symbol, the iconographic symbol of St Bernardino of Siena: an IHS Christogram inside a sun. The symbol can be seen in front of the narrow window, above the frescoed semicircular tympanum above the portal. The monogram is above three stones symbolizing mountains. Atop the roofline are two Romanesque-era lions (Viterbese symbols) which were affiliated with the coat of arms of the Ghibelline Tignosi family. There was a hospital adjacent to this church. In front of the facade in the piazza is the Fountain of the Gesu assembled from pieces of a fountain once in the convent of the Dominican order. Across the piazza is the medieval Torre di Borgognone.

From the late seventeenth century until 1825, the monks of the Penitenza took rooms in the nearby palace belonging to the Di Vico family, and used San Silvestro for their religious services. After 1825, the church was administered again by the Jesuits. By 1971, much of the church was dilapidated with parts of the roof collapsed. Restoration was pursued in 1987 with some patronage by the Cassa di Risparmio Bank of Viterbo. In 2024, the church is assigned to the Catholic society of Knights and Dames of the Equestrian Order of the St Sepulcher.

== Murder in 1271 of Henry of Cornwall ==
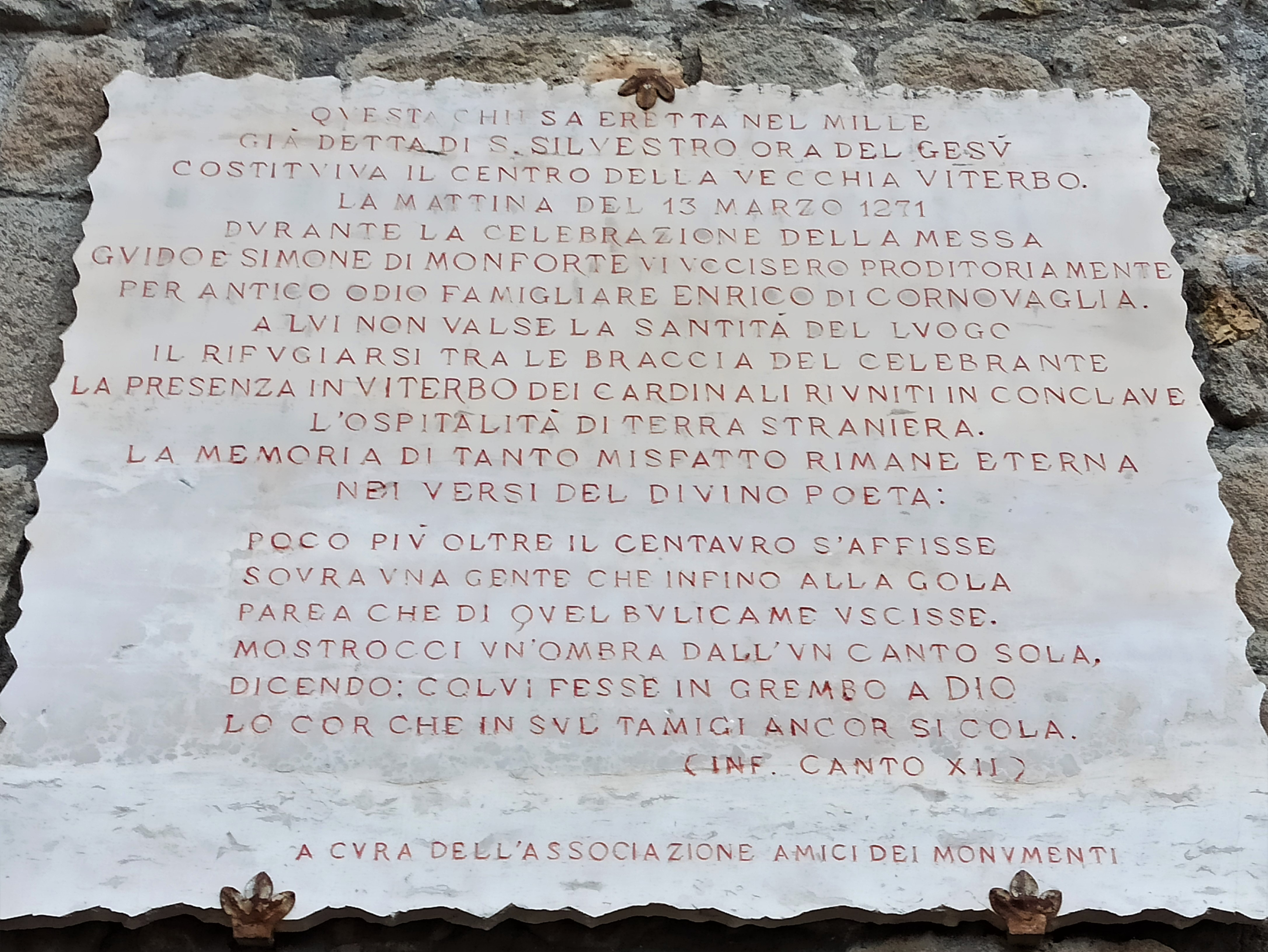
Plaque outside of church

Guy de Montfort and Simon de Montfort the Younger were the sons of Simon de Montfort, 6th Earl of Leicester who died in the bloody Battle of Evesham during the Barons’ Revolt of 1265. After the battle, the Earl of Leicester's corpse was mutilated by decapitation and other gruesome displays. Guy and Simon escaped to the continent, but maintained a grievance with those who had allied with the murderers of their father.

On the 13th of March, 1271, both the King of Sicily, Charles I d'Anjou, and the King of France, Phillip III, were returning to the continent after signing the Treaty of Tunis to end the Eighth Crusade. They stopped in Viterbo to lobby for the conclusion of the election of a pope by the ongoing conclave. This meeting of cardinals, lasting from 1268 to 1271, was the longest papal election in the history. Henry of Cornwell, a cousin of theirs and of King Edward I of England, and ally of the English king, who was pledged as a liege and mercenary to the King of Sicily, had accompanied the King Charles I. The two brothers, Guy and Simon, hatched a plan to avenge their fathers death. While mass was being celebrated, the brothers entered into the church and murdered Henry and two clergymen. Guy dragged the dying Henry and impaled him to the door of the church. The Monfort brothers were able to escape from the town. In 1273, Pope Gregory X, who had been ultimately elected by that conclave, excommunicated Guy. However, Guy remained at large for a decade until he was captured by the Angevins during a naval battle in Naples, and was left to die in a jail in Messina. The burial ceremony for Henry was held in 1273 in San Francesco with the attendance of Pope Gregory X, Charles I d'Anjou, and Edward I of England and his queen-consort.

In Canto XII; 115-120 of Inferno, Dante places Guy in a river boiling blood. A plaque outside the church recalls the treachery of this vendetta, the violation of the sanctuary of the site and the hospitality offered to strangers.

== Description ==
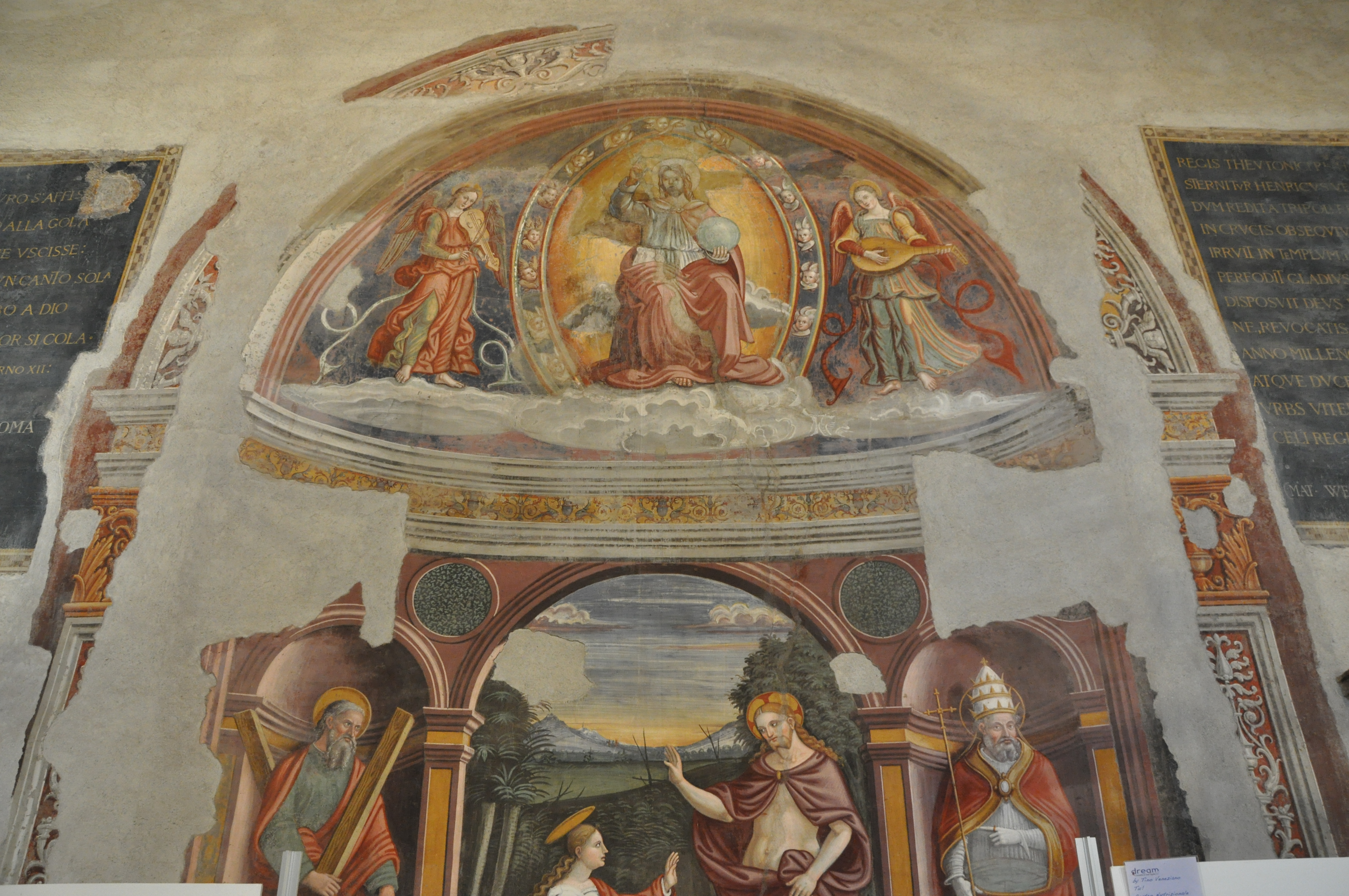
Apse frescoes

Above the portal is a damaged 16th-century fresco of the Madonna and two Saints. The apse dome is frescoed with a Noli me tangere between the Saints Andrew and Silvester (1540) and above a God the Father among the celestial choir. A 17th-century wooden crucifix in the presbytery, is said to have come from the church of Santa Maria Nuova. There are also the remains of a 15th-century fresco with St John the Baptist and St John the Evangelist and a mosaic picture (1981) by Enzo Mattioli which portrays The Murder of Henry of Cornwall.
