= San Giovanni Battista del Gonfalone, Viterbo =

Church in Lazio, Italy

Coordinates: 42.41493°N 12.10490°E

San Giovanni Battista del Gonfalone (St John the Baptist of the Banner) is a Baroque architecture, Roman Catholic oratory (chapel or small church for a confraternity) located on #11 Via Cardinal La Fontaine in Viterbo, region of Lazio, Italy.

== History and description ==
The Confraternity of San Giovanni Battista originally met in an oratory near the cathedral called San Giovanni in Valle, but in 1561, this group joined the Roman Confraternity of the Gonfalone, founded by St Bonaventure of Bagnoregio. Its members wore the dress of white sackcloth with a cross during processions. Among its aims was to collect funds to pay the ransoms of the Christian prisoners being held by Muslims, as well as providing a dowry for two decent orphan girls.

In 1664, the confraternity purchased this site, and commissioned the design of a new oratory church from the architect Giovanni Maria Baratta. The first stone was laid by Cardinal Francesco Maria Brancaccio on 21 December 1665. It took sixty years to complete, with the final touch was the concave facade was designed in 1725 by the architect Francesco Ferruzzi. The frieze proclaims this construction of the church by the confraternity in 1726. The two heraldic shields above the entrance portal belong to Pope Benedict XIII Orsini and Bishop Sermattei (1719–1731). The interior is richly decorated with paintings and frescoes. The structure has two rooms, the anteroom, a chapel for parishioners, leading to the oratory for the confraternity.

Ceiling with a Glory by Stringelli and quadratura by Marzetti

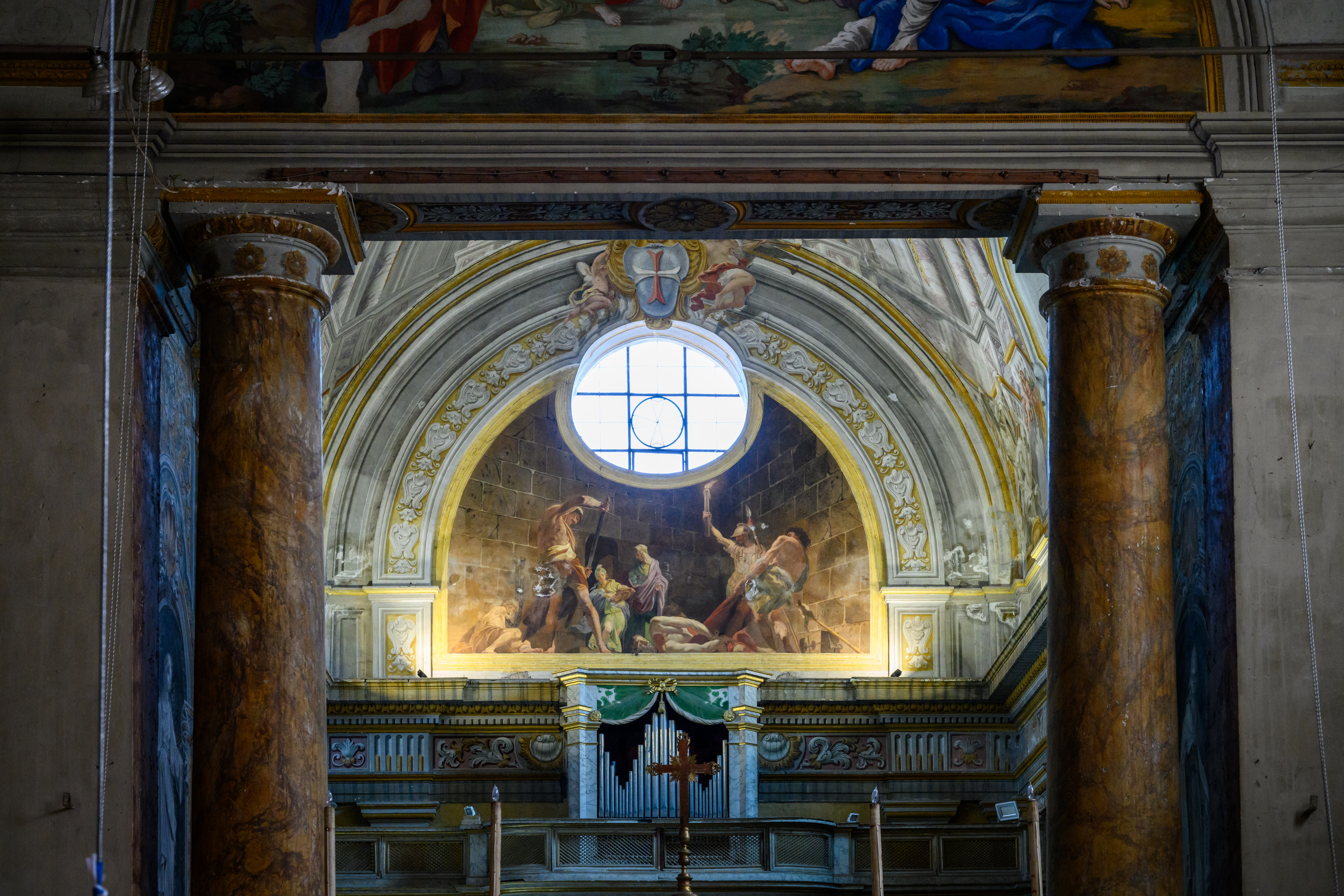
Decapitation of the Baptist by Pietro Piazza and Giuseppe Rosa

The interiors are richly frescoed with quadratura and religious scenes. The quadratura was painted by Giuseppe Marzetti and the ceiling of the anteroom has a depiction of Glory of John the Baptist (surrounded by old testament prophets) by Vincenzo Stringelli; both painted in 1756. The St John the Baptist before Herod (1756) in the lunette of the main altar was painted by a local artist, Anton Angelo Falaschi. At the entrance in the lunette above the organ, we can see fresco of the Decapitation of the Baptist (1756) painted by Domenico Corvi. On the first altar on the right are two processional statues of the Passion and in the second chapel is an altar cloth portraying St Bonaventure writing under inspiration by the Holy Spirit. The altar in this chapel was completed by Domenico Lucchi.

In the two false niches flanking the main altar are two monochrome figures representing Science and Religion (1772). The altar 1746 was designed by the architect Nicola Salvi. The yellow veined marble frontal with green and red border displays the symbol of the Confraternity in its centre.

The Oratory houses the Confraternity Standard painted by Giovanni Francesco Romanelli. The standard represents the Baptism of Christ and the Madonna of Mercy (1649). The wooden choir stalls created by Carlantonio Morini (1833–34). On the walls above these, painted by Pietro Piazza and his compatriot Giuseppe Rosa are a series of monochrome scenes portraying episodes from the life of the Baptist. From the left we can see the Angel and Zachariah, John in the desert, God summoning John to his mission, John reproaching Herod, the Lamb of God, the Decapitation of John the Baptist. The spandrels and the ceilings of the apse were frescoed by Giuseppe Rosa in 1747. The ceiling depicts the Birth of the Baptist attributed to Pietro Orlandi, and the lunettes depict the Sermon of St John. A 17th-century canvas derived from the church of San Silvestro depicts the Death of St Anne. ( XVII century).
