= Teatro San Leonardo, Viterbo =

Theatre in Viterbo, Italy

Coordinates: 42.41647°N 12.10546°E

The Teatro San Leonardo is a theater in Viterbo, region of Lazio, Italy. The building was built in sixteenth century and has had various reincarnations over the centuries. Once a town prison, it also housed a church dedicated to San Leonardo, staffed by the confraternity of the same name, which attended to the incarcerated and poor. In modern times, the site was converted into a theater.

== Description ==
The Teatro San Leonardo is located on Via Cavour #9 in Viterbo. It is a small stage for mainly intimate dramas, concerts, and screenings. It also sponsors a school for the dramatic arts for both children and adults.

== History ==
The building had become the civic jail in 1576, and a church built alongside by 1636. The church at the site was consecrated in 1641, under the administration of the Confraternity (Sodalizio) of San Leonardo. The church once had an altarpiece depicting St Leonard, patron saint of prisoners, painted by Anton Angelo Bonifazi.

During the Napoleonic occupation of the town, it was deconsecrated and made into a prison, which spanned between Via Cavour and Via Leonardo. Reconsecrated again in 1816 by Bishop Severoli, it later became a theater. Its present reincarnation was made possible by communal, provincial, and national patronage.

In 1960, it was inaugurated as the auditorium Pope John XXIII for children's movies, to becoming a theater school in 1991, and a theater in 2017. Above the portal, there is a cardinal's coat of arms with an eagle.

A modern parish church dedicated to St Leonardo Murialdo is located in the suburbs east of the historic center of Viterbo.
