= Porcia (wife of Brutus) =

1st-century BC Roman woman, wife of Brutus

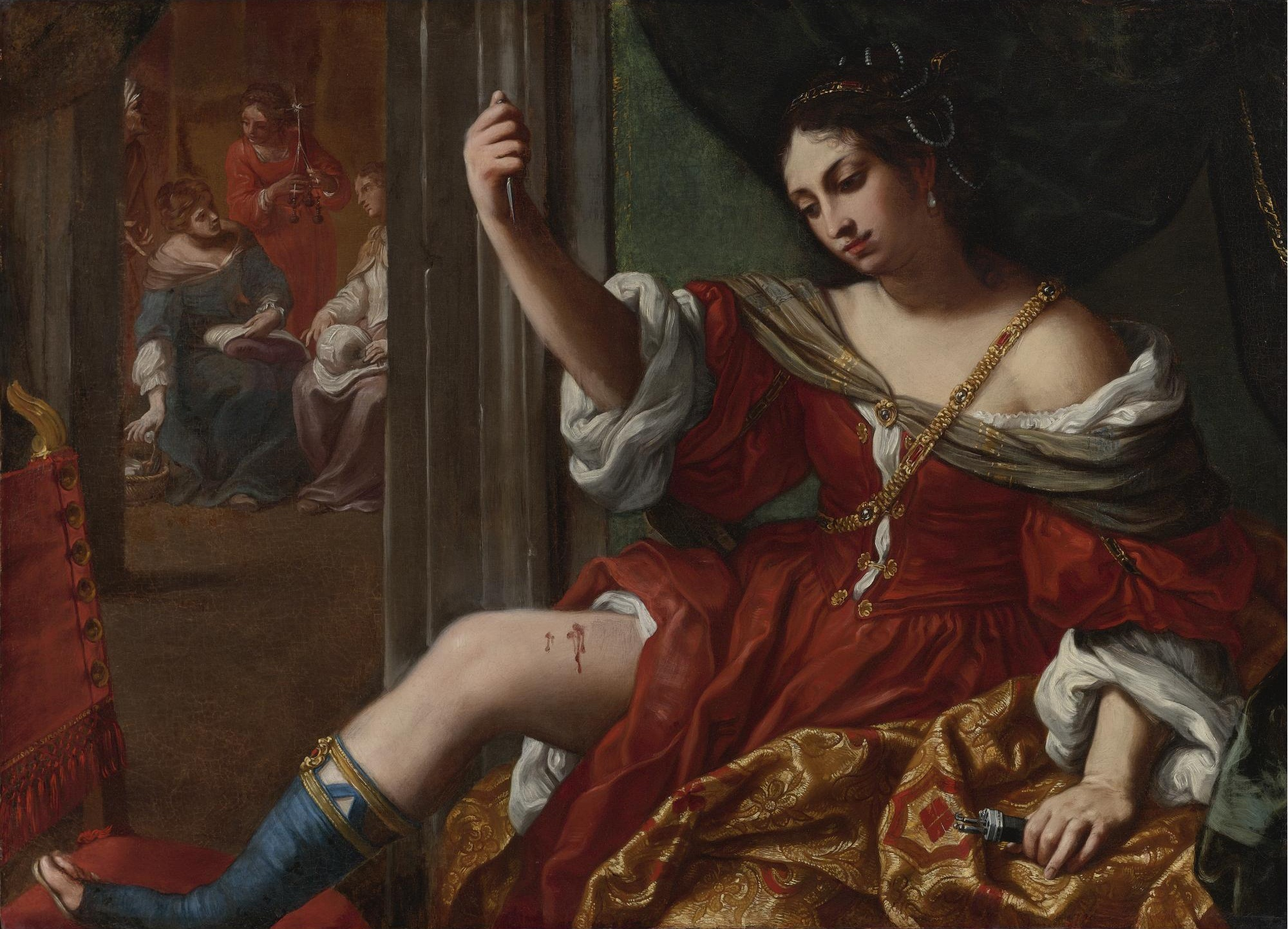
- Painting by Elisabetta Sirani
- Born: c. 73 BC
- Died: June 43 BC (aged 29–30)
- Spouse(s): Marcus Calpurnius Bibulus; Marcus Junius Brutus
- Children: At least 2 (by Bibulus)
- Parents: Cato the Younger (father); Attilia (mother)

Porcia (c. 73 BC – June 43 BC), occasionally spelled Portia, especially in 18th-century English literature, was a Roman woman who lived in the 1st century BC. She was the daughter of Marcus Porcius Cato Uticensis (Cato the Younger) and his first wife Atilia. She is best known for being the second wife of Marcus Junius Brutus, the most famous of Julius Caesar's assassins, and appears primarily in the letters of Cicero.

== Biography ==
=== Early life ===
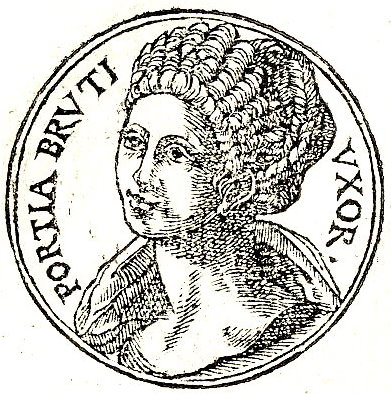
Porcia from Guillaume Rouillé's Promptuarii Iconum Insigniorum

Porcia was born around 73 BC. She had an affectionate nature, was interested in philosophy, and was "full of an understanding courage." Plutarch describes her as being prime of youth and beauty. When she was still very young, her father divorced her mother for adultery.

At a young age she was married first to Marcus Calpurnius Bibulus, her father's political ally, who was 29 years older than her, between 58 BC and 53 BC. Porcia's father was a member of the Optimate political faction, and adamantly opposed Julius Caesar. Porcia embraced these ideals, and did not outwardly object to the arranged marriage. With Bibulus she had at least two children, at least one of them a son. Lucius Calpurnius Bibulus (born around 59 BC) was possibly one of them, although most modern historians believe Porcia was too young to have mothered Lucius, and that he was Bibulus' son by his previous marriage, as he was old enough to fight in the Battle of Philippi in 42 BC. He died in 32 BC. It is possible that a son of Porcia and Bibulus was the man who wrote the biography of Brutus.

A few years later, the elderly but renowned Roman orator Quintus Hortensius applied to Cato for Porcia's hand in marriage. According to Plutarch, this was because he wished to be more closely allied with Cato's family. Hortensius suggested that, if Bibulus was very attached to Porcia, he could still marry her but then return her to Bibulus once she had given birth to a male heir. He argued that, although human customs might disapprove of such an arrangement, it was against natural law to keep a girl of Porcia's youth and beauty from producing children for her father's allies and impractical for her to overproduce for Bibulus. Nonetheless, Cato refused to break up Porcia's marriage with Bibulus. Instead, Cato divorced his wife, Porcia's stepmother Marcia, and gave her to Hortensius; he remarried her after Hortensius died.

In 52 BC, Julius Caesar's Gallic Wars came to an end, but he refused to return to Rome, despite the Senate's demands that he lay down his arms. Cato personally detested Caesar, and was his greatest enemy in the Senate; Cato's political faction, the Optimates (also known as the Boni), believed that Caesar should return to Rome, in order for the Optimates to strip him of his property and dignitas, and permanently exile Caesar. In 49 BC, Caesar crossed the Rubicon with his army, thus declaring war, beginning the Great Roman Civil War. Both Cato and Bibulus allied with Gnaeus Pompeius Magnus against Caesar. Though both Boni hated Pompey, he did not pose the threat to their faction that Caesar did. Bibulus commanded Pompey's navy in the Adriatic Sea. He captured a part of Caesar's fleet, although this was generally insignificant as Caesar went on to decisively defeat Pompey at the Battle of Pharsalus. Bibulus died in 48 BC from influenza following Pompey's defeat, leaving Porcia a widow.

In 46 BC, Cato committed suicide following his defeat in the battle of Thapsus while Marcus Cato, Porcia's brother, was pardoned by Caesar and returned to Rome.

=== Marriage to Brutus ===
Brutus, Porcia's first cousin, divorced his wife Claudia and married Porcia (who was 12 years younger) in 45 BC. The marriage was scandalous as Brutus did not state any reasons for divorce despite having been married to Claudia for many years. Claudia was very popular for being a woman of great virtue, and was the daughter of Appius Claudius Pulcher, who had been Brutus's ally for many years. She was also related to Pompey by marriage through her younger sister. The divorce was not well received by some, including Brutus's mother, Servilia, who despised her half-brother Cato, and appears to have been jealous of Brutus's affection for Porcia. Therefore, Servilia supported Claudia's interests against those of Porcia.

On the other hand, Porcia was highly favoured with the followers of both Pompey and Cato, so the marriage was favoured by people such as Marcus Tullius Cicero and Titus Pomponius Atticus. The marriage was Brutus's way of honouring his uncle. Nonetheless, it appears that Porcia deeply loved Brutus and was utterly devoted to him. She resolved not to inquire into Brutus's secrets before she had made a trial of herself and that she would bid defiance to pain.

Brutus, along with many other co-conspirators, murdered Caesar in 44 BC. He promised to share the "heavy secrets" of his heart with his wife but it is unclear if he ever got the chance. Some historians believe Porcia may have known about the plot, and may have even been involved in the conspiracy itself. Plutarch claims that she happened upon Brutus while he was pondering over what to do about Caesar and asked him what was wrong. When he did not answer, she suspected that he distrusted her on account of her being a woman, for fear she might reveal something, however unwillingly, under torture. In order to prove herself to him, she secretly inflicted a wound upon her own thigh with a barber's knife to see if she could endure the pain. As a result of the wound, she suffered from violent pains, chills and fever. Some believe that she endured the pain of her untreated wound for at least a day. As soon as she overcame her pain, she returned to Brutus and said:

You, my husband, though you trusted my spirit that it would not betray you, nevertheless were distrustful of my body, and your feeling was but human. But I found that my body also can keep silence... Therefore fear not, but tell me all you are concealing from me, for neither fire, nor lashes, nor goads will force me to divulge a word; I was not born to that extent a woman. Hence, if you still distrust me, it is better for me to die than to live; otherwise let no one think me longer the daughter of Cato or your wife.

Brutus marveled when he saw the gash on her thigh and after hearing this he no longer hid anything from her, but felt strengthened himself and promised to relate the whole plot. Lifting his hands above him, he is said to have prayed that he might succeed in his undertaking and thus show himself a worthy husband. Yet Brutus never got the chance as they were interrupted and never had a moment's privacy before the conspiracy was carried out. On the day of Caesar's assassination, Porcia was extremely disturbed with anxiety and sent messengers to the Senate to check that Brutus was still alive. She worked herself up to the point whereupon her fainting, her maids feared that she was dying.

When Brutus and the other assassins fled Rome to Athens, it was agreed that Porcia should stay in Italy. Porcia was overcome with grief to part from Brutus, but tried hard to conceal it. When she came across a painting depicting the parting of Hector from Andromache in the Iliad, however, she burst into tears, feeling it reflected her own sorrow. She would go on to visit this painting multiple times per day. Brutus' friend Acilius heard of this, and quoted Homer where Andromache speaks to Hector:

But Hector, you to me are father and are mother too, my brother, and my loving husband true.

Brutus smiled, saying he would never say to Porcia what Hector said to Andromache in return (Ply loom and distaff and give orders to thy maids), saying of Porcia:

...Though the natural weakness of her body hinders her from doing what only the strength of men can perform, she has a mind as valiant and as active for the good of her country as the best of us.

=== Death ===
The claim that Porcia's death occurred before that of Brutus is backed up by a letter sent by Cicero. This letter would have been sent in late June or early July 43 BC, before either battle of Philippi. It further suggests that Porcia did not commit suicide, but died of some lingering illness. As Plutarch states, if the letter was genuine Brutus lamented her death and blamed their friends for not looking after her. There is also an earlier letter from Brutus to Atticus, which hints at Porcia's illness and compliments him for taking care of her. Cicero later wrote his surviving letter to Brutus, consoling him in his grief, calling Porcia "one such as never before has been in the world." This is probably the most accurate account of Porcia's death.

Porcia's death has been a fixation for many historians and writers. It was believed by a majority of contemporary historians that Porcia committed suicide in 42 BC, reputedly by swallowing hot coals. Modern historians find this tale implausible, however, and one popular speculation has Porcia taking her life by burning charcoal in an unventilated room, thus succumbing to carbon monoxide poisoning.

The exact timing of Porcia's death is also a problem. Some modern classicists like John H. Collins assert that she died in the summer of 43 BC. Most contemporary historians, however, (Cassius Dio, Valerius Maximus, and Appian) claim that she killed herself after hearing that Brutus had died following the second battle of Philippi. Nicolaus says it happened before Brutus' death, however, saying she died following the first battle of Philippi, claiming that she only thought he was dead, and that Brutus wrote a letter to their friends in Rome, blaming them for Porcia's suicide. Plutarch dismisses Nicolaus' claims of a letter stating that too much was disclosed in the letter for it to be genuine. Plutarch also repeats the story of swallowing charcoal, but disbelieves it:

As for Porcia, the wife of Brutus, Nicolaüs the philosopher, as well as Valerius Maximus, relates that she now desired to die, but was opposed by all her friends, who kept strict watch upon her; whereupon she snatched up live coals from the fire, swallowed them, kept her mouth fast closed, and thus made away with herself. And yet there is extant a letter of Brutus to his friends in which he chides them with regard to Porcia and laments her fate, because she was neglected by them and therefore driven by illness to prefer death to life. It would seem, then, that Nicolaüs was mistaken in the time of her death, since her distemper, her love for Brutus, and the manner of her death, are also indicated in the letter, if, indeed, it is a genuine one.

Plutarch also acknowledges the false image that Porcia displays, explaining that she was "frightened with every little noise and cry," "possessed with the fury of the Bacchantes," and had passed out and been carried into her home. Plutarch's description of Camma in Dialogue of Love is similar to his interpretation of Porcia in Brutus, and with both works being written around the same time period, Plutarch's anecdotes concerning Camma might have influenced those about Porcia. The character of Panthea in Xenophon's Cyropaedia also presents similarities to Plutarch's Porcia – with both women expressing to their husbands that they are truly devoted, and are willing to harm themselves to prove themselves – being another possible inspiration for Plutarch's portrayal of Porcia. In totality, Plutarch accentuates Porcia's role as loyal wife using his portrayal of her suicide.

According to the political journalist and classicist Garry Wills, although Shakespeare has Porcia die by the method Plutarch repeats, but rejects, "the historical Porcia died of illness (possibly of plague) a year before the battle of Philippi"...“but Valerius Maximus [mistakenly] wrote that she killed herself at news of Brutus’s death in that battle. This was the version of the story celebrated in works like Martial's Epigram 1.42." The claim that Porcia's death occurred before that of Brutus is backed up by a letter sent by Cicero. This letter would have been sent in late June or early July 43 BC, before either battle of Philippi. It further suggests that Porcia did not commit suicide, but died of some lingering illness. As Plutarch states, if the letter was genuine Brutus lamented her death and blamed their friends for not looking after her. There is also an earlier letter from Brutus to Atticus, which hints at Porcia's illness and compliments him for taking care of her. Cicero later wrote his surviving letter to Brutus, consoling him in his grief, calling Porcia "one such as never before has been in the world." This is probably the most accurate account of Porcia's death.

== Family ==
Brutus family tree

Salonia (2)	Cato the Elder	Licinia (1)
Marcus Porcius Cato Salonianus	Marcus Porcius Cato Licinianus	Marcus Livius Drusus
Marcus Porcius Cato (2)	Livia	Quintus Servilius Caepio (1)	Marcus Livius Drusus
Atilia (1)	Cato the Younger	Marcus Livius Drusus Claudianus, adopted son
Marcus Junius Brutus (1)	Servilia, mistress of Julius Caesar (see AUGUSTUS below)	Decimus Junius Silanus (2)	Servilia	Gnaeus Servilius Caepio	Lucius Appuleius SATURNINUS
Marcus Porcius Cato	Porcia	Marcus Junius Brutus†	Junia Prima	Junia Tertia	Gaius Cassius Longinus x	Marcus Aemilius Lepidus (consul 78 BC)	Appuleia, daughter of SATURNINUS
Junia Secunda	Marcus Aemilius Lepidus (triumvir)	Lucius Aemilius Paullus (consul 50 BC)
Descendant of POMPEY MAGNUS and Lucius Cornelius SULLA	son (perhaps Quintus Aemilius Lepdius?)	Marcus Aemilius Lepidus Minor (the Younger)	Servilia Isaurica, daughter of Junia Prima (see above) and Publius Servilius Isauricus	Emperor AUGUSTUS (possibly, see JULIO-CLAUDIANS for descendants)	Paullus Aemilius Lepidus	Cornelia, daughter of Gnaeus Cornelius Lentulus Marcellinus and Scribonia, wife of AUGUSTUS and mother of Julia the Elder
Manius Aemilius Lepidus	Aemilia Lepida II (also engaged to Lucius Caesar, see JULIO-CLAUDIANS and AUGUSTUS)	Publius Sulpicius Quirinius (of the Sulpicia gens, related to GALBA below)	Lucius Aemilius Paullus (consul 1)	Julia the Younger, daughter of Julia the Elder and Marcus Vispanius Agrippa, see AUGUSTUS and Cornelia above	Marcus Aemilius Lepidus (consul 6 AD)
daughter (perhaps known as Aemilia Lepida?)
Aemilia Lepida	Servius Sulpicius GALBA	Mamercus Aemilius Scaurus (of the Aemilia gens, related to the Lepidae)	Marcus Junius Silanus Torquatus (of the Junia gens, related to BRUTUS, see above)	Aemilia Lepida	CLAUDIUS (see AUGUSTUS above and JULIO-CLAUDIANS)	Lucius Vitellius (consul 34)	Livilla, daughter of Drusus the Elder and sister of Germanicus and CLAUDIUS, aunt of Drusus Caesar (see JULIO-CLAUDIANS and to the right)	Lucius Aelius Sejanus, the almost emperor	Aemilia Lepida	Drusus Caesar, son of Agrippina the Elder, daughter of Julia the Elder (see AUGUSTUS and Julia the Younger above and see JULIO-CLAUDIANS)
Gaius Cassius Longinus (descended from or related to GAIUS CASSIUS LONGINUS, see above)	Junia Lepida	Junia Calvina	Lucius Vitellius (consul 48)	Aulus VITELLIUS (for Otho's relation, in terms of the Year of the Four Emperors, he married Poppaea Sabina, who married NERO, see AUGUSTUS and CLAUDIUS above)
Cassia Longina	Gnaeus Domitius Corbulo, brother of Milona, wife of CALIGULA, see JULIO-CLAUDIANS and see above
Lucius Aelius Lamia Plautius Aelianus	Domitia Longina	Domitian, see FLAVIANS and VESPASIAN
Plautia (possibly existed, although unsure, but if so, then her brother is Lucius Fundanius Lamia Aelianus, father of Lucius Plautius Lamia Silvanus, alleged ancestor of Fabia Orestilla, wife of Gordian I, see GORDIANS)	Lucius Ceionius Commodus
Lucius Aelius Caesar	Marcus Aurelius (see NERVA-ANTONINES)
Lucius Verus (for further relations, see NERVA-ANTONINES)	Lucilla

(1): 1st spouse
(2): 2nd spouse
†: assassin of Caesar

== Portia in popular culture ==
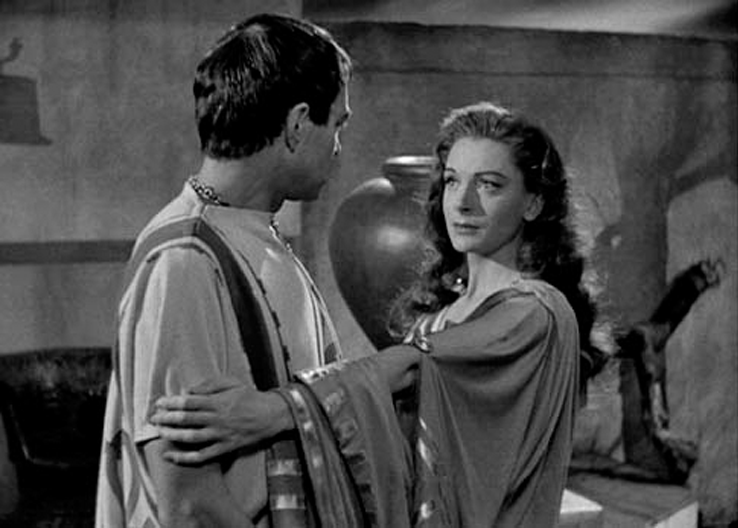
Portia, played by Deborah Kerr, and James Mason as Marcus Junius Brutus, in the 1953 film Julius Caesar

=== Literature ===
==== Classic ====
- In Shakespeare's play Julius Caesar, she appears in fictionalised form as Brutus' wife. She makes only two appearances. Portia and Calpurnia are the only two substantial female roles in the play. It is reported in the fourth act that she died by swallowing fire.
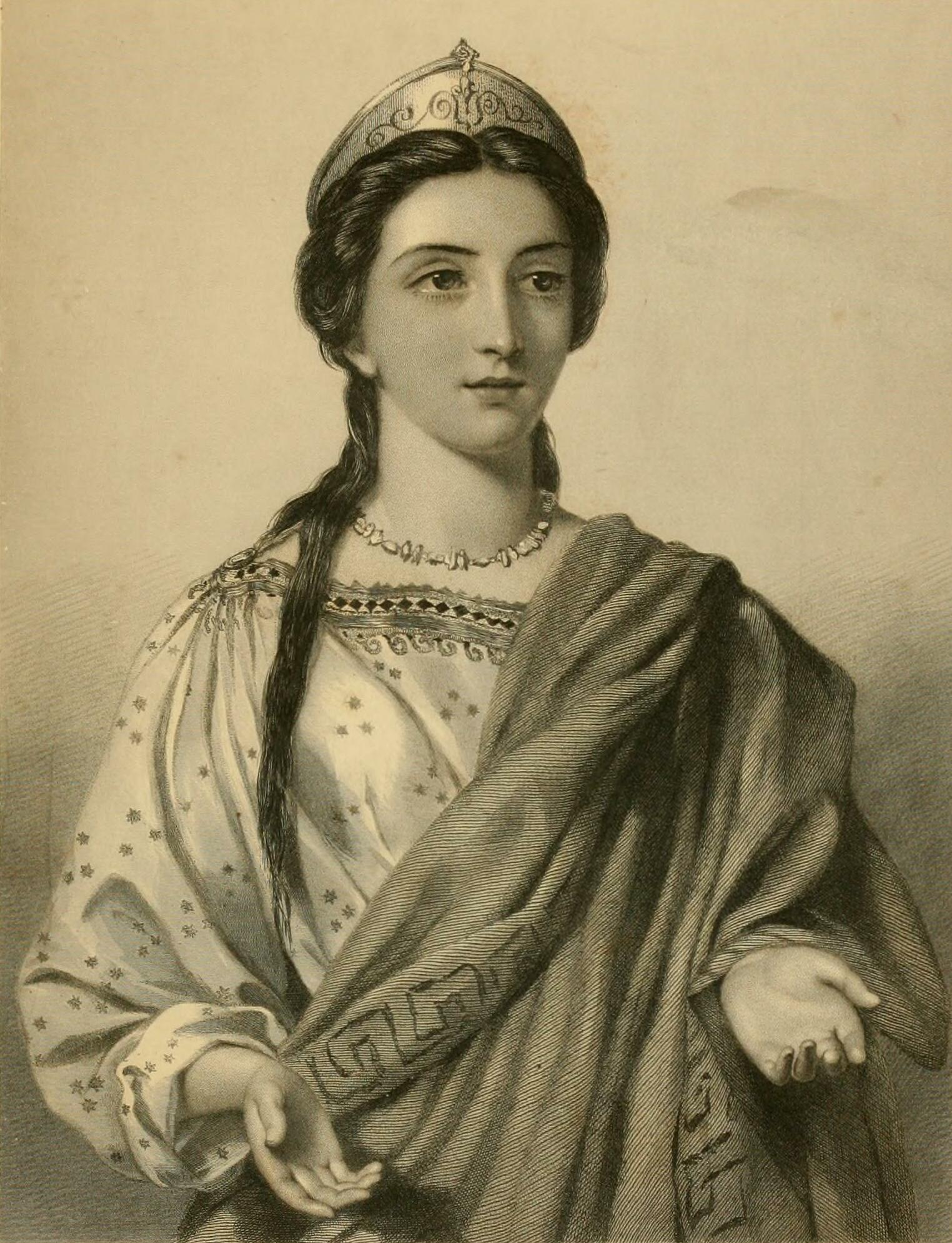
  Portia, Wife of Brutus, John William Wright (c. 1849)
- Portia is also briefly mentioned in Shakespeare's The Merchant of Venice in regards to the character of her namesake, Portia:

In Belmont is a lady richly left;
And she is fair, and, fairer than that word,
Of wondrous virtues: sometimes from her eyes
I did receive fair speechless messages:
Her name is Portia, nothing undervalued
To Cato's daughter, Brutus' Portia.

- In Robert Garnier's play Porcie, she is the heroine of the play, which describes her suicide. In the play, she is devastated to hear of the death of her husband and kills herself. Her servant announces to the Romans that Portia died swallowing live coals, before taking her own life with a dagger.
- In The Purgatory of Suicide by Thomas Cooper, Portia is one of the suicides spoken of in the poem. Here Portia's life is compared to the death of Arria, Pœtus' wife.

==== Modern ====
- In Masters of Rome, a series of seven novels by the Australian writer Colleen McCullough, Porcia appears as a child in Caesar's Women, as a teenager in Caesar and as a young woman in The October Horse. Porcia is portrayed as being, first a rabid unthinking follower of republican values, then as a raving maniac, and then as perhaps totally insane. Servilia, who abuses her constantly, later writes to Brutus before the battle of Philippi to inform him that Porcia went mad and killed herself by swallowing live coals. Brutus, however, recognizes that it is more likely that Servilia murdered Porcia by forcing burning coals down her throat. Given the vicious character of Servilia in the novel, this murder is perfectly believable.
- She appears in The Ides of March, an epistolary novel by Thornton Wilder, describing the events leading up to the death of Julius Caesar. Porcia is one of the main characters in fourth part of the book. Cicero speaks of her as the only person that Brutus loves. Porcia and Servilia exchange several letters, hinting towards Servilia's dislike of her. Caesar later sends a letter to Porcia informing her that Brutus is returning to Rome, and Porcia replies with a polite thank you; Caesar later confesses to Lucius Mamilius Turrinus (the chief character) that he greatly envies Brutus his marriage to her and often wishes he could have married her himself.
