= The October Horse =

Novel by Colleen McCullough

- First US edition cover
- Author: Colleen McCullough
- Language: English
- Series: Masters of Rome series
- Genre: Historical novel
- Publisher: Century (UK); Simon & Schuster (US)
- Publication date: 7 November 2002
- Publication place: Australia
- Media type: Print (Hardback & Paperback)
- Pages: 608 pp (first edition, hardback)
- ISBN: 0-7126-8056-X (first edition, hardback)
- OCLC: 59462504
- Preceded by: Caesar
- Followed by: Antony and Cleopatra

The October Horse is the sixth novel in Colleen McCullough's Masters of Rome series. It was first published in November 2002 by Century in UK and Simon & Schuster in USA.

== Plot introduction ==
The book begins with Gaius Julius Caesar's Egyptian campaign in Alexandria, his final battles with the Republicans led by Metellus Scipio, Cato the Younger, Titus Labienus and the brothers Pompeius in Africa and Spain, and ultimately Caesar's assassination on the Ides of March by Marcus Brutus, Gaius Cassius and the Liberators. The latter stages of The October Horse chronicle the death of Cicero, the emergence of Octavian and his battles with Mark Antony, and conclude with the Battle of Philippi.

=== Explanation of the novel's title ===
The title of the book comes from a peculiar chariot race in Rome on the Ides of October, after which the right-hand horse of the winning team was sacrificed to the Roman gods. Then two teams, one from the Subura and the other from the Via Sacra, competed for the Horse's head. Julius Caesar, figuratively the best war horse in Rome, represents the October Horse in this novel.

== Characters in The October Horse ==
- Gaius Julius Caesar,
- Cleopatra,
- Mark Antony,
- Marcus Tullius Cicero,
- Gaius Octavius. Later Augustus,
- Marcus Aemilius Lepidus,
- Marcus Junius Brutus,
- Gaius Cassius Longinus,
- Marcus Porcius Cato the Younger,
- Caesarion, son of Julius Caesar,
- Servilia, mistress of Caesar,
- Publius Cornelius Dollabella,
- Titus Labienus,
- Porcia Catonis, wife of Marcus Brutus
- Pharnaces II,
- Lucius Julius Caesar,
- Atia, mother of Octavius
- Lucius Marcius Philippus, stepfather of Octavius
- Marcus Calpurnius Bibulus

== Release details ==
- 2002, UK, Century Press (ISBN 0-7126-8056-X), Pub date 7 November 2002, hardback (First edition)
- 2003, UK, Arrow Books (ISBN 0-09-946132-3), Pub date ? ? 2003, paperback
- 2003, USA, Pocket Books (ISBN 0-671-02420-5), Pub date ? November 2003, paperback
- 2003, UK, Arrow Books (ISBN 0-09-928052-3), Pub date 7 August 2003, paperback

== Reception ==
Kirkus Reviews says the book is "a rousing and richly satisfying take on some of history's real beings."
