= Ides of March coin =

43–42 BC Roman denarius coin

Ides of March Denarius
- Rome
- Value: One denarius
- Mass: 3.80 g
- Diameter: 18 mm
- Orientation: 12 o'clock
- Years of minting: 43 BC to 42 BC

Obverse
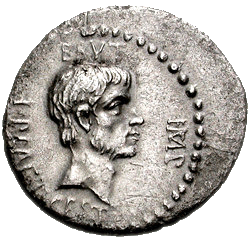
- Design: Marcus Junius Brutus
- Designer: Lucius Plaetorius Cestianus

Reverse
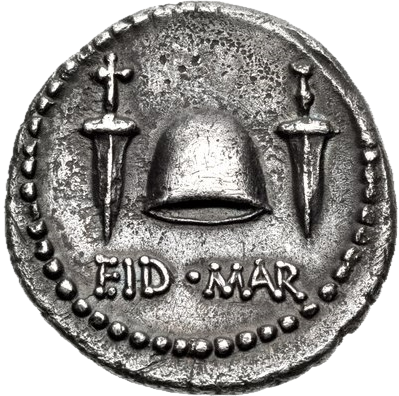
- Design: Pileus between two daggers
- Designer: Lucius Plaetorius Cestianus

The Ides of March coin, also known as the Denarius of Brutus or EID MAR, is a rare version of the denarius coin, issued by Marcus Junius Brutus from 43 to 42 BC. The coin was struck to celebrate the March 15, 44 BC, assassination of Julius Caesar. It features a bust of Brutus, who was one of the assassins, on the obverse while the reverse features a pileus cap between two daggers. The coin was minted in both silver and gold. Approximately 100 of the silver coins are known to exist, but only three of the gold examples have survived. The coin is considered one of the rarest ancient Roman coins.

== Background ==
The coin was struck with the words EID MAR (short for Eidibus Martiis – on the Ides of March) to commemorate the assassination of Julius Caesar on March 15, 44 BC. The assassin Brutus appears on the coin's obverse with a bust of him, looking to the right. The reverse of the coin displays a pileus cap flanked by two daggers. EID MAR appears on the reverse below the daggers to commemorate the assassination of Caesar during the Ides of March. The pileus cap was a Roman symbol of freedom, and was often worn by recently freed slaves. The daggers represent the weapons which were used to kill Julius Caesar.

The minting of the coins took place between 43 and 42 BC, coinciding with the Liberators' civil war. The coins were struck by a "military mint" which traveled with Brutus. The coins were ordered by Brutus and produced by Lucius Plaetorius Cestianus, possibly to pay Brutus's army. The issuance of the coin suggests that the assassination was legitimized by the state, but it was not. The minting of the coin may also be a political statement or propaganda commissioned by the assassins of Caesar. An interpretation of the coin's symbols is that the Roman state was liberated from slavery with the assassination of Caesar.

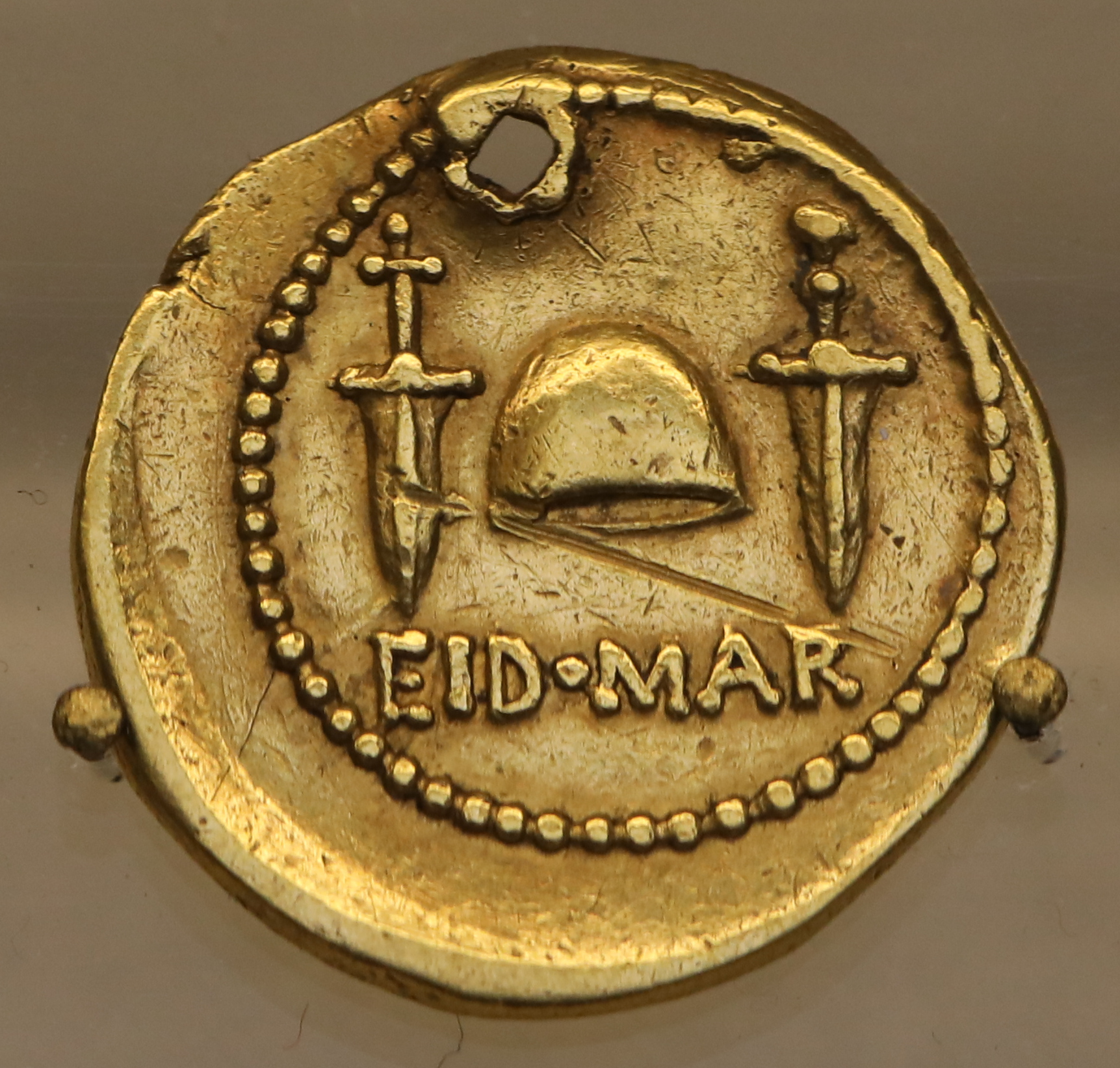
Scarce gold version of the Eid Mar

== Varieties ==
The coin is roughly the size of the American nickel coin, and it is considered valuable and rare. It was called the number 1 coin in Harlan Berk's 2019 book, 100 Greatest Ancient Coins. The majority of the coins were struck in silver, but there is an exceedingly scarce variety of the coin struck in gold.

There are approximately 100 known examples struck in silver and only three known examples of the gold variety. One of the surviving gold coins has a hole made in it during the Roman period, likely so that it could be worn as jewellery. On October 29, 2020, one of the gold variety sold at the Roma Numismatics auction in London, for £3,240,000 (US$4,190,000). The coin was returned to Greece in 2023 after it was determined to have been looted from a field near where Brutus's army was encamped. The undisclosed buyer handed over the coin to American authorities and a British dealer was arrested on charges of grand larceny. Roma Numismatics subsequently closed its doors in May 2024 in the aftermath of the coin's repatriation.
