= Masters of Rome =

Series of historical novels by Colleen McCullough

Masters of Rome is a series of historical novels by Australian author Colleen McCullough, set in ancient Rome during the last days of the old Roman Republic; it primarily chronicles the lives and careers of Gaius Marius, Lucius Cornelius Sulla, Pompey the Great, Gaius Julius Caesar, and the early career of Caesar Augustus. It spans from January 1, 110 BC through to January 16, 27 BC.

== Cast of characters ==
Other major historical figures who appear and play prominent parts in the series include Mithridates VI of Pontus, Marcus Aemilius Scaurus, Publius Rutilius Rufus, Quintus Sertorius, Marcus Livius Drusus, Jugurtha of Numidia, Lucius Licinius Lucullus, Spartacus, Marcus Licinius Crassus, Marcus Tullius Cicero, Marcus Calpurnius Bibulus, Marcus Porcius Cato, Publius Clodius, Titus Annius Milo, Vercingetorix, Marcus Junius Brutus, Gaius Cassius Longinus, Mark Antony, Cleopatra VII of Egypt, Caesarion and Marcus Vipsanius Agrippa. Each book in the series features a detailed glossary, hand-drawn illustrations of the major characters, and notes by McCullough detailing her reasoning for portraying certain events in certain ways.

== Historical thesis ==
The series has a thesis (first introduced in 1939 by Sir Ronald Syme in his epic historical treatise The Roman Revolution): as Rome became more powerful within the Mediterranean world, the old ways of doing things – through the deliberation of various interests, mainly aristocratic and mercantile – became impossibly cumbersome. It became more and more difficult to govern an empire with institutions originally designed to administer a city-state. Certain powerful leaders (especially Marius, Sulla, and Caesar) tried to create a state in which they had autocratic power but also preserved the externals of the old ways. They were opposed by the conservatives (called the optimates by classical historians, though they themselves preferred the title boni or "good men"). The result was the birth of an imperial monarchy, and a radically different organization of power.

== Depiction of Caesar ==
McCullough portrays Caesar as an autocrat, great military man, populist, and controversial reformer. She does not portray the death of the Republic as positive, but rather portrays Caesar as a great man and his crossing of the Rubicon as inevitable, given that the alternative was exile, disgrace, and the violation of his dignitas, which was an unthinkable anathema to a Roman Patrician of consular rank. According to McCullough's portrayal, Caesar's crossing of the Rubicon was his last option, his last roll of the dice, as best illustrated by the timeless quote from Caesar: "The die is cast." McCullough points out that the translation of the alternative Greek version of his words is "Let the dice fly high," which characterises not fatalism (as with the former) but rather risk-taking.

== List of novels ==
The novels of the series are

1. The First Man in Rome (1990); spanning the years 110–100 BC
2. The Grass Crown (1991); spanning the years 97–86 BC
3. Fortune's Favourites (1993); spanning the years 83–69 BC
4. Caesar's Women (1997); spanning the years 67–59 BC
5. Caesar (1998); spanning the years 54–48 BC
6. The October Horse (2002); spanning the years 48–41 BC
7. Antony and Cleopatra (2007); spanning the years 41–27 BC

== Continuation of the series ==
McCullough originally decided to end the series with The October Horse because in her opinion the ultimate fall of the Roman Republic took place after the Battle of Philippi, with the death of Caesar's assassins. However, most historians place the end of the Republic a decade later, after the final showdown between Augustus and Mark Antony at the Battle of Actium, in 31 BC.

McCullough said that her publisher wanted her to write The Thorn Birds sequels instead of the Roman books because the latter, while popular, did not sell as well. Bob Carr, former premier of New South Wales, publicly campaigned for McCullough to write further Roman novels. In response to lobbying from fans, McCullough completed one more volume, Antony and Cleopatra, released in September 2007 in the UK and December 2007 in the US. Carr argued that she should not continue in chronological order through the Second Triumvirate and the Julio-Claudian and Flavian dynasties, but instead skip ahead to write about the Five Good Emperors. This was always unlikely, as her eyesight deteriorated due to macular degeneration before her death in early 2015.
