= Ides of March =

Midpoint day in the Roman month of March

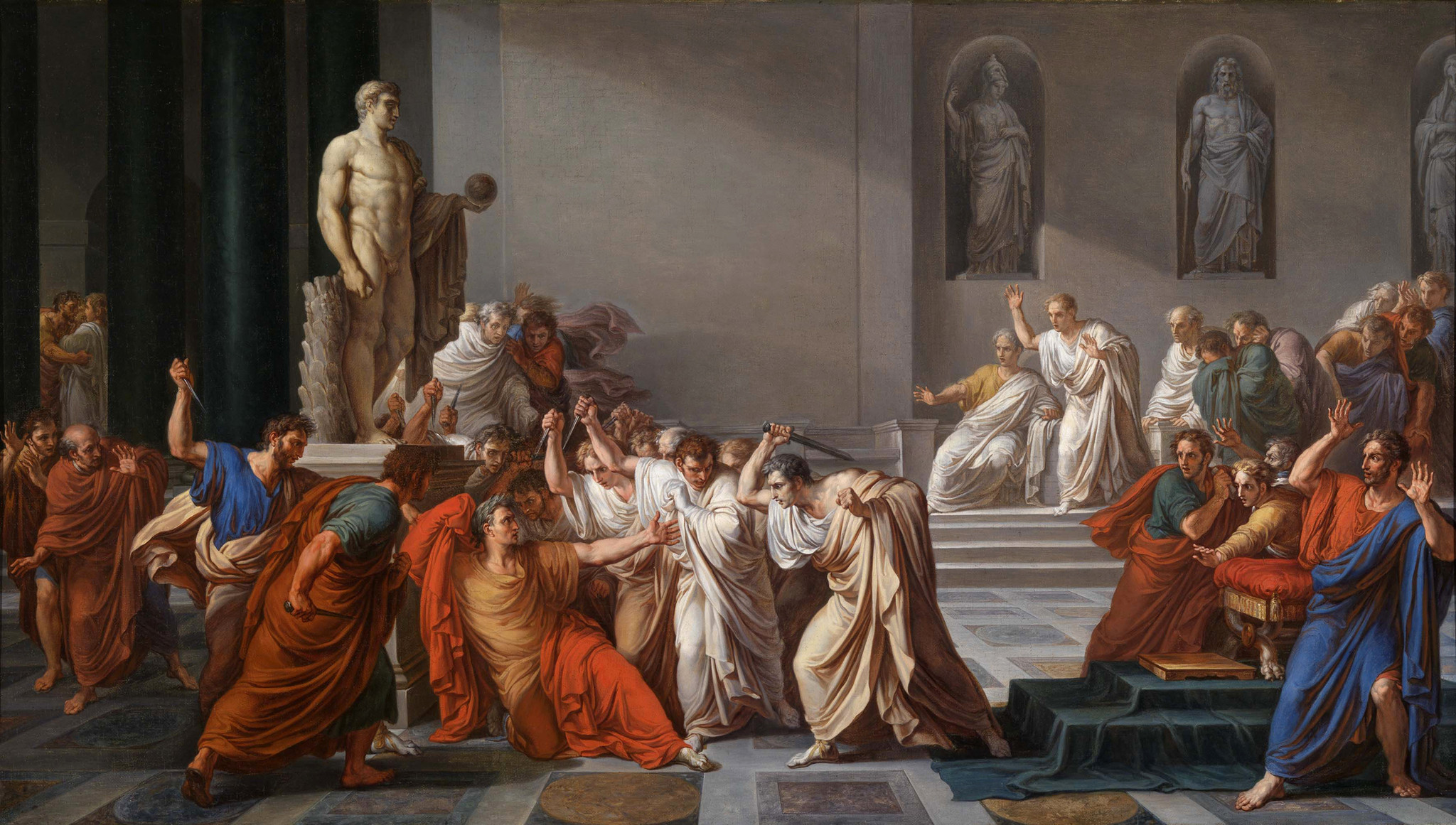
The Death of Julius Caesar (1806) by Vincenzo Camuccini

The Ides of March (/ˈaɪdz/) is the day on the Roman calendar marked as the Idus, roughly the midpoint of a month, of Martius, corresponding to 15 March on the Gregorian calendar. It was marked by several major religious observances. In 44 BC, it became notorious as the date of the assassination of Julius Caesar, which made the Ides of March a turning point in Roman history.

== Ides ==
The Romans did not number each day of a month from the first to the last day. Instead, they counted back from three fixed points of the month: the Nones (the 5th or 7th, eight days before the Ides), the Ides (the 13th for most months, but the 15th in March, May, July, and October), and the Kalends (1st of the following month).

Originally the Ides were supposed to be determined by the full moon, reflecting the lunar origin of the Roman calendar. Martius (March) was the first month of the Roman year until as late as the mid-second century BC, an order reflected in the numerical names of the months of September (the seventh month) through December (the tenth month) not corresponding to their current position on the Gregorian calendar. In the earliest Roman calendar, the Ides of March would have been the first full moon of the new year. As a fixed point in the month, the Ides accumulated functions set to occur every month, and was the day when debt payments and rents were due.

=== Religious observances ===
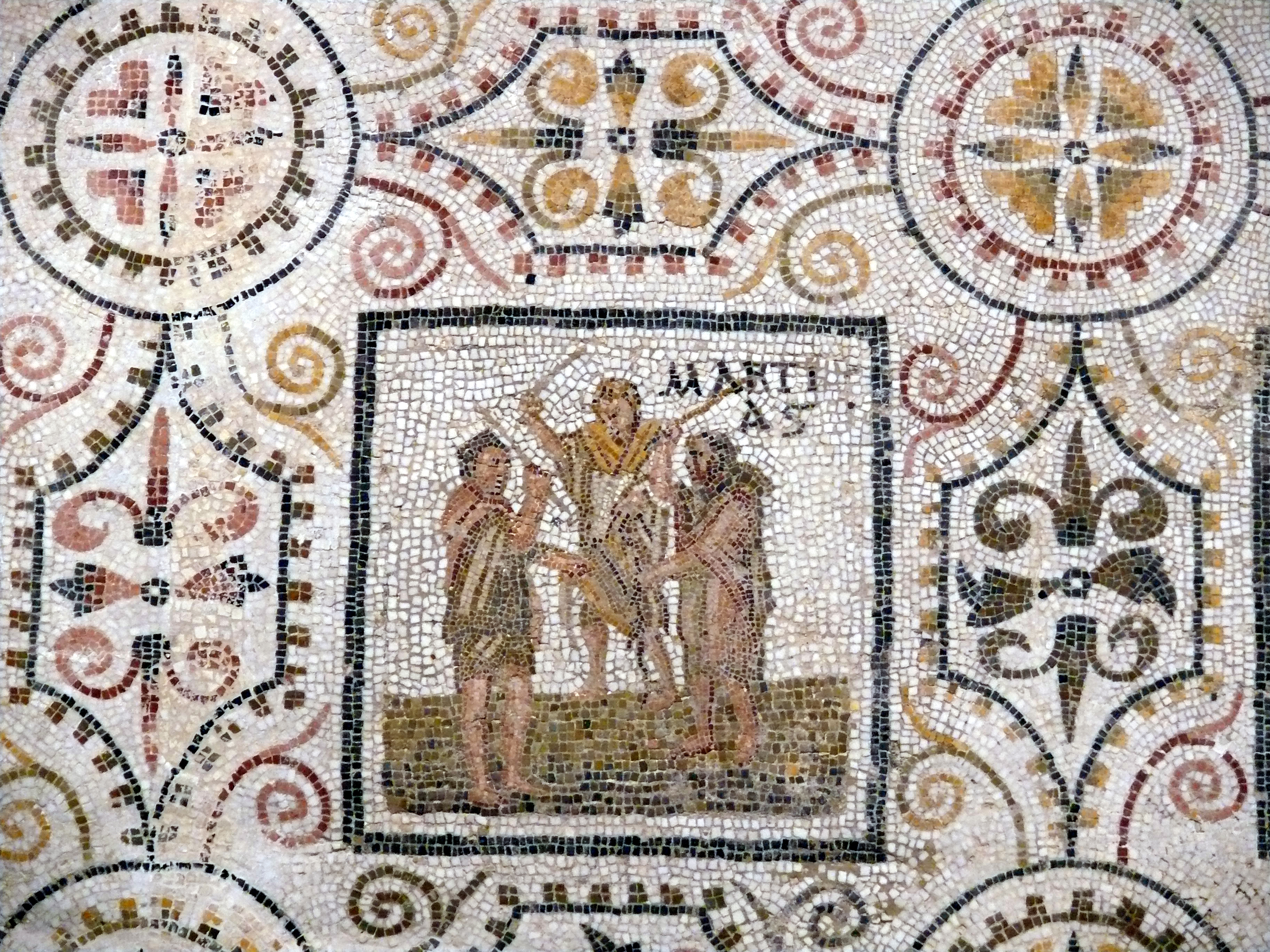
Panel thought to depict the Mamuralia, from a mosaic of the months in which March is positioned at the beginning of the year (first half of the third century AD, from El Djem, Tunisia, in Roman Africa)

The month of Martius was named for the god Mars, whose "birthday" was celebrated on the first, but the Ides of each month were sacred to Jupiter, the Romans' supreme deity. The Flamen Dialis, Jupiter's high priest, led the "Ides sheep" (ovis Idulis) in procession along the Via Sacra to the arx, where it was sacrificed.

March retained many of its new-year ceremonies even when it was preceded on the calendar by January and February. In addition to the monthly sacrifice, the Ides of March was also the occasion of the Feast of Anna Perenna, a goddess of the year (Latin annus) whose festival originally concluded the ceremonies of the new year. The day was enthusiastically celebrated among the common people with picnics, drinking, and revelry. One source from late antiquity also places the Mamuralia on the Ides of March. This observance, which has aspects of scapegoat or ancient Greek pharmakos ritual, involved beating an old man dressed in animal skins and perhaps driving him from the city. The ritual may have been a new-year festival representing the expulsion of the old year.

In the later Imperial period, the Ides began a "holy week" of festivals celebrating Cybele and Attis, being the day Canna intrat ("The Reed enters"), when Attis was born and found among the reeds of a Phrygian river. He was discovered by shepherds or the goddess Cybele, who was also known as the Magna Mater ("Great Mother") (narratives differ). A week later, on 22 March, the solemn commemoration of Arbor intrat ("The Tree enters") commemorated the death of Attis under a pine tree. A college of priests, the dendrophoroi ("tree bearers") annually cut down a tree, hung from it an image of Attis, and carried it to the temple of the Magna Mater with lamentations. The day was formalized as part of the official Roman calendar under Claudius (d. 54 AD). A three-day period of mourning followed, culminating with celebrating the rebirth of Attis on 25 March, the date of the vernal equinox on the Julian calendar.

== Assassination of Caesar ==
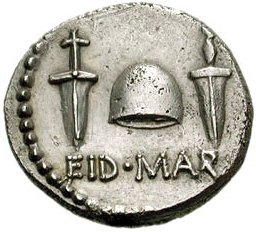
Reverse side of the Ides of March coin (a denarius) issued by Caesar's assassin Brutus in the autumn of 42 BC, with the abbreviation EID MAR (Eidibus Martiis – "on the Ides of March") under a "cap of freedom" between two daggers

In modern times, the Ides of March is best known as the date on which Julius Caesar was assassinated in 44 BC. Caesar was stabbed to death at a meeting of the Senate. As many as 60 conspirators, led by Brutus and Cassius, were involved. According to Plutarch, a seer had warned that harm would come to Caesar on the Ides of March. On his way to the Theatre of Pompey, where he would be assassinated, Caesar passed the seer and joked, "Well, the Ides of March are come", implying that the prophecy had not been fulfilled, to which the seer replied, "Aye, they are come, but they are not gone." This meeting is famously dramatised in William Shakespeare's play Julius Caesar, when a soothsayer warns Caesar to "Beware the Ides of March". Roman biographer Suetonius identifies the "seer" as a haruspex named Spurinna.

Caesar's assassination opened the final chapter in the crisis of the Roman Republic. After his victory in Caesar's civil war, his death triggered a series of further Roman civil wars that would finally result in the rise to sole power of his adopted heir Octavian. In 27 BC, Octavian became emperor Augustus, and thus he finally terminated the Roman Republic. Writing under Augustus, Ovid portrays the murder as a sacrilege, since Caesar was also the pontifex maximus of Rome and a priest of Vesta. On the fourth anniversary of Caesar's death in 40 BC, after achieving a victory at the siege of Perugia, Octavian executed 300 senators and equites who had fought against him under Lucius Antonius, the brother of Mark Antony. The executions were one of a series of actions Octavian took to avenge Caesar's death. Suetonius and the historian Cassius Dio characterised the slaughter as a religious sacrifice, noting that it occurred on the Ides of March at the new altar to the deified Julius.

== See also ==
- The Ides of March – a 1948 novel by Thornton Wilder
- The Ides of March (est. 1964) – an American musical group
- "The Ides of March" – a 1981 song by Iron Maiden
- "The Ides of March" – a 2005 song by Silverstein
- The Ides of March – a 2008 novel by Valerio Massimo Manfredi
- The Ides of March – a 2011 film by George Clooney, Beau Willimon and Grant Heslov
- The Ides of March – a 2021 music album by Myles Kennedy
