= Caesar (McCullough novel) =

1997 novel by Colleen McCullough

Caesar: Let the Dice Fly
- First US edition
- Author: Colleen McCullough
- Language: English
- Genre: Historical Fiction
- Publisher: William Morrow (US)
- Publication date: 1997
- Publication place: Australia
- Media type: Print (Hardback & Paperback)
- Preceded by: Caesar's Women
- Followed by: The October Horse

Caesar: Let the Dice Fly is a 1997 novel by Australian author Colleen McCullough. It is the fifth historical novel in the author's Masters of Rome series.

== Plot summary ==
The novel opens in 54 BC, with Caesar in the middle of his epochal Gallic campaigns, having just invaded Britannia. The first half of the novel deals broadly with the conclusion of his conquests in Gaul, and the second half narrates the growing sense of unease in Rome concerning Caesar's intentions, the antagonism of the conservative 'boni' faction towards him, his crossing of the Rubicon, his invasion of Italy and his victory in the Civil War.

Some of the pivotal moments include Caesar's return from Britannia; his narrow escape during the battle of Gergovia; his great victory at Alesia, which involved the complete circumvallation of the citadel, the repulse of a relief force, and the acceptance of the surrender of Vercingetorix; his final destruction of the Gallic resistance at Uxellodunum; the death of Julia and Marcus Licinius Crassus; his falling out with Gnaeus Pompeius Magnus and the final collapse of the First Triumvirate system; his failed negotiations concerning his re-election as consul; the opening of the Civil War; the Battle of Dyrrhachium and the Battle of Pharsalus; the flight of Pompey to Ptolemaic Egypt and his assassination there; and the scattering of the 'boni' leadership.

== Reception ==
Kirkus reviews noted that the book was dense for the average reader, but enjoyable for the "armchair general."

== Sources ==
- McCullough, Colleen (1998). Caesar. Century Books. ISBN 0-7126-3852-0.
- Pearl N, Hoffert B. Book reviews: Fiction. Library Journal. 1997;122(17):93. Accessed August 6, 2025.
- Hiett J, Boaz A. Audio reviews. Library Journal. 1998;123(2):130. Accessed August 6, 2025.
