= Caesar's Women =

Book by Colleen McCullough

- Book cover, featuring Caesar (left) and his mistress Servilia (right)
- Author: Colleen McCullough
- Cover artist: John Rush
- Language: English
- Genre: Historical Fiction
- Publisher: William Morrow (US); Century (UK)
- Publication date: 21 March 1996
- Publication place: Australia
- Media type: Print (Hardback & Paperback)
- ISBN: 978-0-380-71084-3
- OCLC: 32856564
- Preceded by: Fortune's Favourites
- Followed by: Caesar

Caesar's Women is the fourth historical novel in Colleen McCullough's Masters of Rome series, published in 1996.

== Plot summary ==
The novel is set during a ten-year interval, from 68 to 58 BC, which Julius Caesar spent mainly in Rome, climbing the political ladder and outmaneuvering his many enemies. It opens with Caesar returning early from his quaestorship in Spain, and closes with his epochal departure for the Gallic campaigns.

Some of the pivotal moments include Caesar's marriage to Pompeia; his curule aedileship; his narrow election as Pontifex Maximus in 63 BC; his praetorship in 62 BC; his divorce from Pompeia; his governorship of Further Spain; the first time he was hailed imperator on the field by his troops, the blocking of his triumphal parade by Marcus Porcius Cato; the creation of the First Triumvirate, which Caesar formed with Marcus Licinius Crassus and Gnaeus Pompeius Magnus in 60 BC; his betrothal of his daughter Julia to Pompey; his marriage to Calpurnia; and his first consulship, in 59 BC.

Reflecting the title, Caesar's divorce and remarriage come into play, as does his daughter's marriage, his lengthy affair with Servilia and his close relationship with his mother, Aurelia. However, most of the plot is concerned with the political struggles of Caesar's rise to power, his conflict with the conservative 'boni' faction, and his election to each post on the Roman ladder of government.

== See also ==
- Women in ancient Rome
