= Santi Faustino e Giovita, Viterbo =

Church in Lazio, Italy

Coordinates: 42.42062°N 12.10355°E

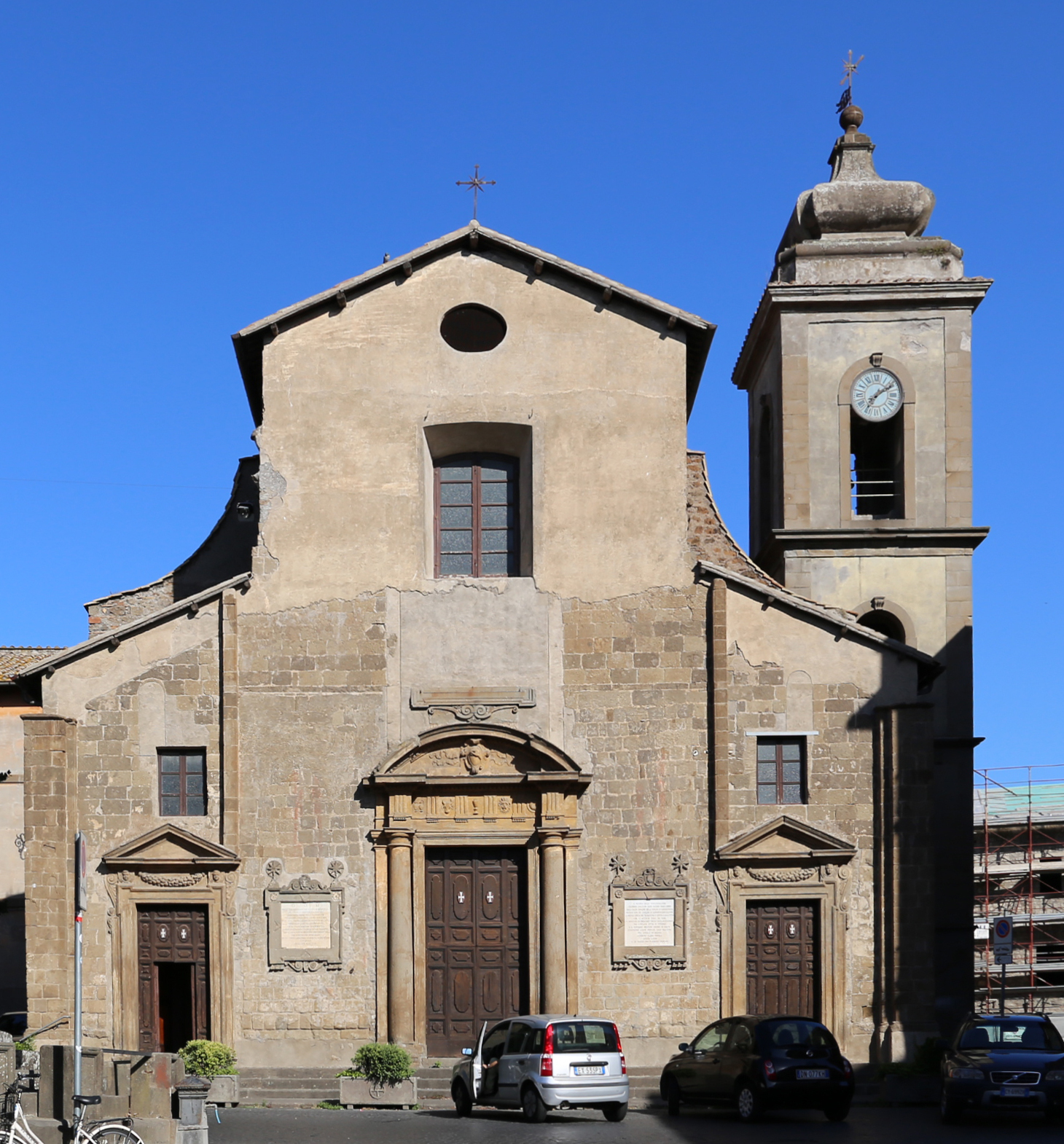
Facade and bell-tower

Santi Faustino e Giovita is a refurbished Romanesque-style, Roman Catholic church located on Piazza San Faustino in Viterbo, region of Lazio, Italy. The church is dedicated to the early Christian martyrs, Faustinus and Jovita.

== History and description ==
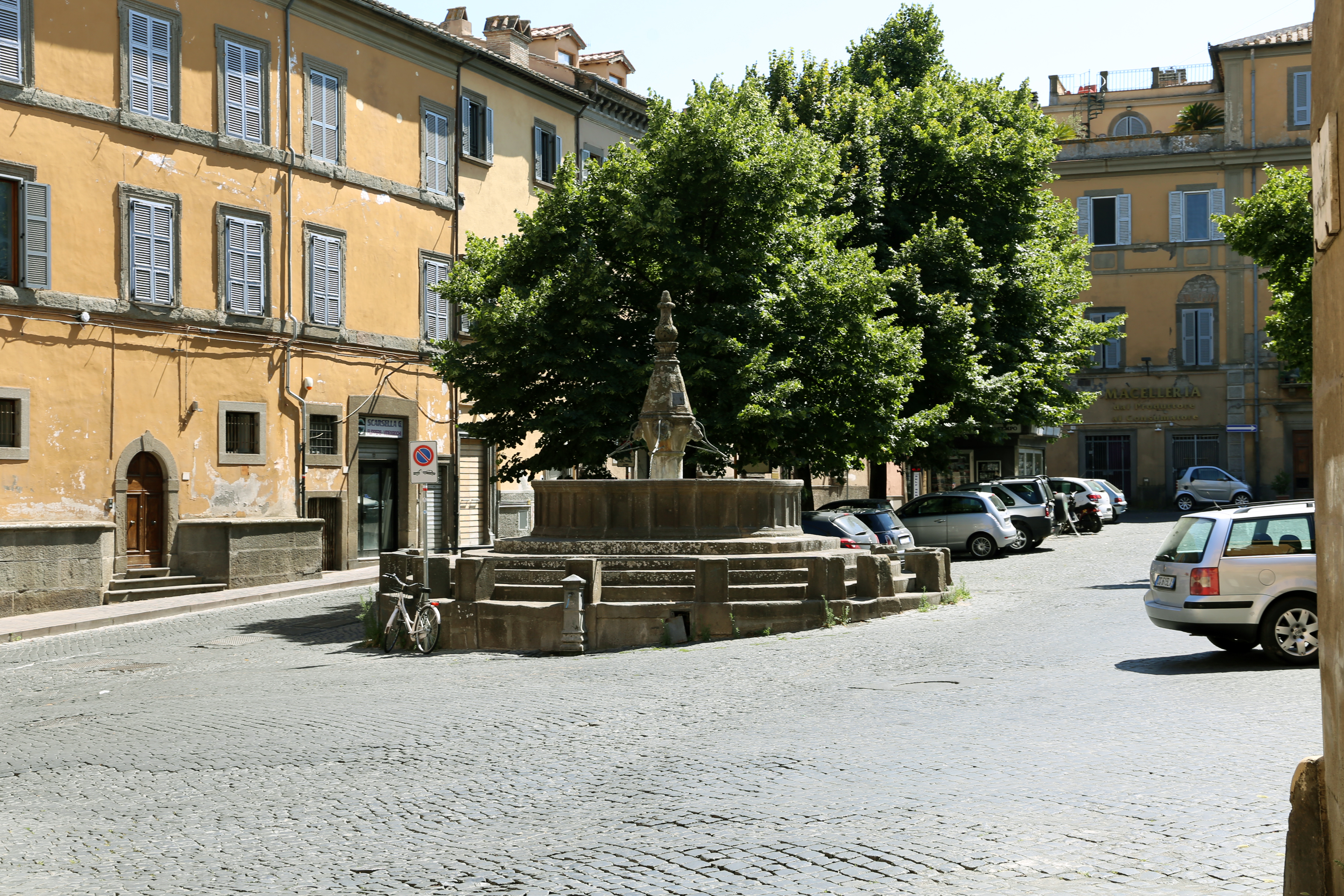
Fountain of San Faustino

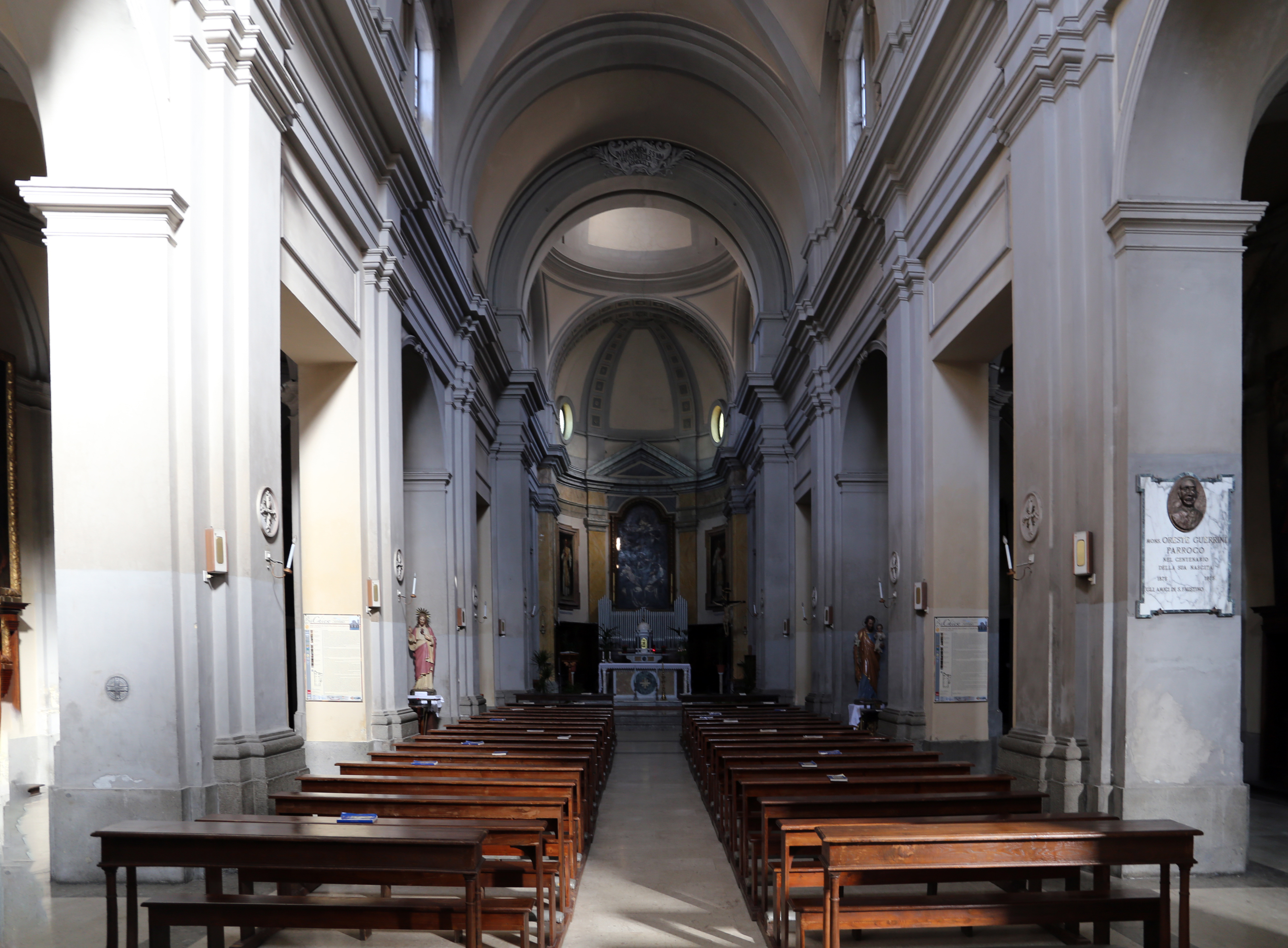
Nave looking towards the main altar and apse

The neighborhood around this church began to populate in 1172 after the destruction of the town of Ferento; the neighborhood was only included within city walls by 1210. The fountain (Fontana di San Faustino) in front of the church was built circa 1252. The church and the town's castle were granted in 1524 by the pope to the Hospitaller knights of Rhodes, recently evicted from the island by the Ottomans. The order of knights was housed in the Rocca Albornoz, located a block northeast of this church. The Grand Master Philippe Villiers de L'Isle-Adam chose the church dedicated to the martyr Faustino, for the religious functions of the Order. He brought to the church a venerated Byzantine icon of the Madonna of Constantinople. In 1527, the Knights parted from Viterbo to relocate to Malta, thus becoming Knights of Malta.

The church was nearly completely rebuilt in 1759, this time with an apsidal dome, with designs by Giuseppe Antolini. The facade now is partially plastered in between peperino stone pilasters. Further refurbishments were completed in 1901 and 1909. Between 1960 and 1962 a new marble floor and roof were added. The central portal has a rounded tympanum. On the southwest flank are wide buttresses. On the left of the central portal a marble plaque with a peperino stone frame from 1654 recalls the presence of the Order of the Knights of Rhodes. The remains of a sundial still remain visible on the left wall. The square belltower, with an onion dome, was added in 1594.

The interior has wooden choir stalls from the 18th century. The terracotta Via Crucis plaques were made in 1965 by Luigi Minciotti. The first altar on the right has a fresco dedicated to the Madonna della Luce and has a 15th-century fresco depicting Saints Bernardino of Siena and Catherine. The altarpiece is a canvas depicting the Immaculate Conception with Saints John the Evangelist and Nicholas of Bari (17th-century) attributed to Angelo Pucciatti. In a room of the former sacristy is an Assumption with Saints Charles Borromeo, Anthony Abbot, Mary Magdalene and Francis (1640) by Filippo Caparozzi, formerly in the Chapel of the Assumption located in the adjacent Monastery. In the right aisle of the presbytery is an altarpiece depicting the Madonna at the Sepulcher with the Angel of the Passion (18th-century) by Ludovico Mazzanti. In the Prada Chapel is a Massacre of the Innocents (1764) by Vincenzo Strigelli. The main altarpiece depicting the Martyrdom of Saints Faustino and Giovita in prison (1761) also by Strigelli. In the left apse is the icon of the Madonna of Constantinople. Other altarpieces (18th-century) depict San Giovanni di Patmos by Urbano Romanelli (son of Giovanni Francesco, and a Beheading of John the Baptist, by Anton Angelo Bonifazi transferred here from the church of San Giovanni Decollato.
