= Bartolomeo Cavarozzi =

Italian painter

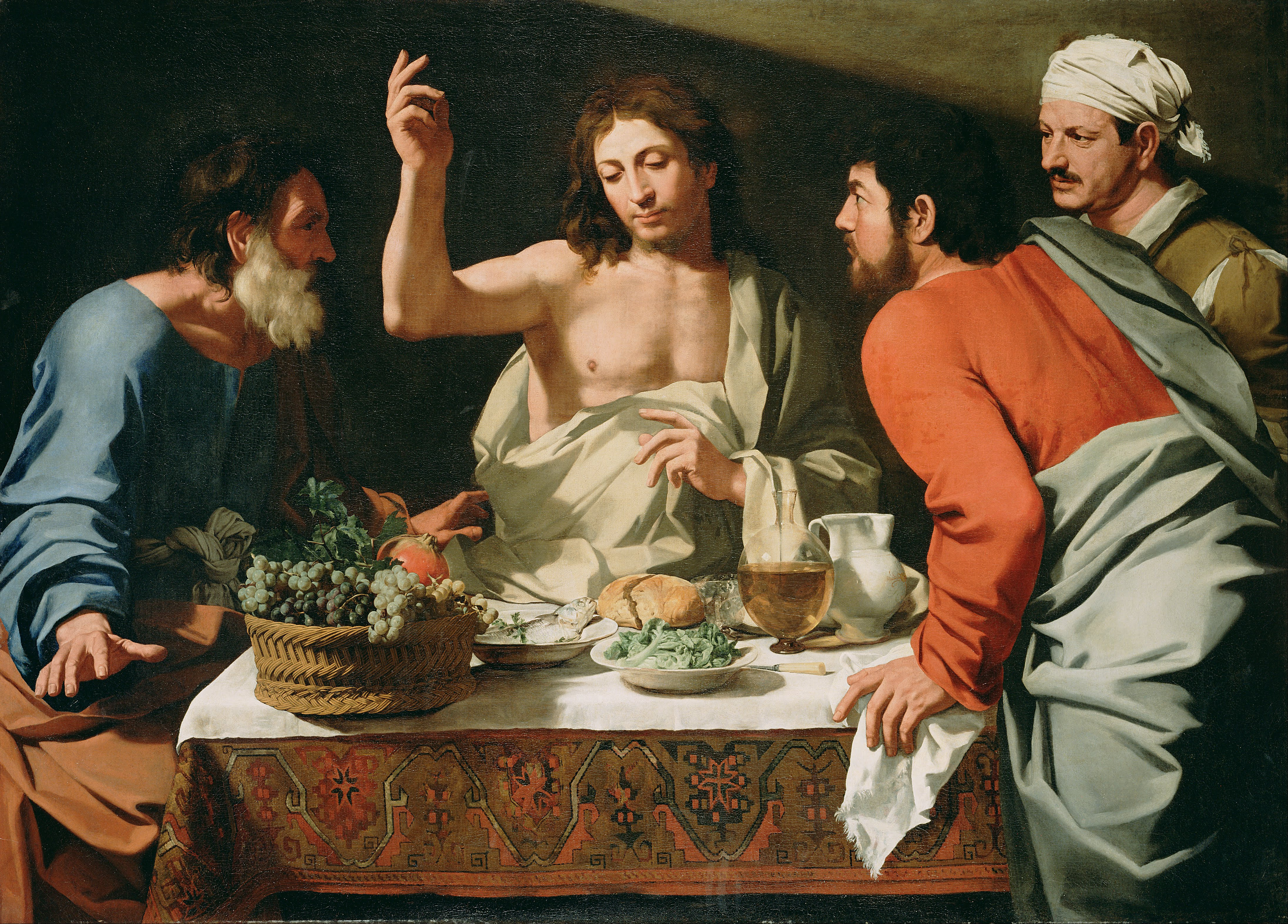
The Supper at Emmaus (c. 1615–25) oil on canvas (55 x 76.73 inches) Getty Center, Los Angeles

Bartolomeo Cavarozzi (1587–1625), occasionally referred to as Bartolomeo Crescenzi, was an Italian caravaggisti painter of the Baroque period. Cavarozzi's work began receiving increased admiration and appreciation from art historians in the last few decades of the 20th century, emerging as one of the more distinct and original followers of Caravaggio. He received training from Giovanni Battista Crescenzi in Rome and later traveled to Spain alongside his master for a few years where he achieved some renown and was significant in spreading "Caravaggism" to Spain before returning to Italy. His surviving works are predominantly Biblical subjects and still-life paintings, although older references note he "was esteemed a good painter especially of portraits".

== Biography ==
Bartolomeo Cavarozzi was born 15 February 1587 in Viterbo in the Lazio region of central Italy. It is believed that he arrived in Rome as a child and received some of his earliest training from Tarquinio Ligustri. One source attributes his training to Guercino (Gian Francesco Barbieri called Guercino da Cento) however that was likely in error as Cavarozzi was four years older than Guercino. The earliest of his known works, Santa Ursula and his companions with Pope Ciríaco and Santa Catalina de Alejandría (1608) was painted for the church of the Confraternity of Sante Orsola e Caterina (now in Basilica of St. Mark the Evangelist, Rome) and shows the influence of Cristofano Roncalli (one of three painters sometimes referred to as Il Pomarancio).

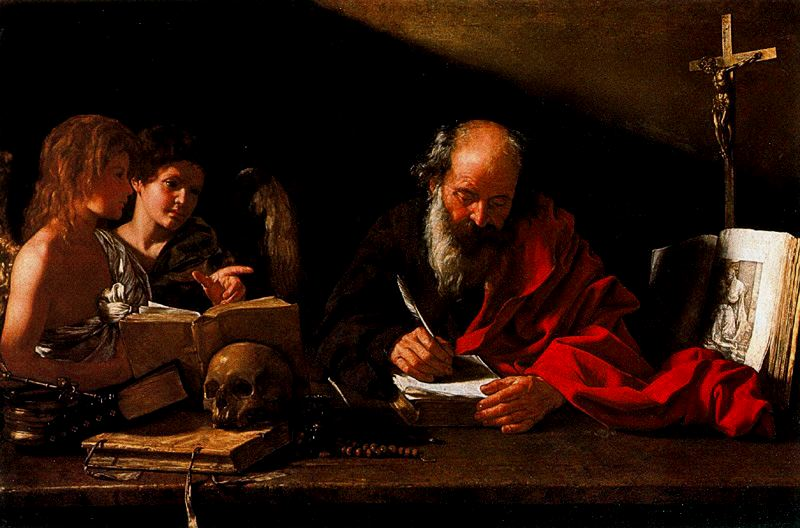
Saint Jerome with Two Angels (1617) oil on canvas (116 x 173 cm) Palatine Gallery. Palazzo Pitti, Florence

At some point before 1617, Bartolomeo Cavarozzi was taken in and living in the palace of a Roman nobleman Giovanni Battista Crescenzi. Crescenzi was a painter and architect who had established an academy in Rome for young painters in the vicinity of the Pantheon, where he taught drawing and art. Much of the training there was focused on drawing directly from life curious and beautiful objects provided by Crescenzi such as fruits, vegetables, animals, and such found around Rome. An example of Cavarozzi's still-life painting is Grape Vines and Fruit, with Three Wagtailsca (ca. 1615–18) in the Metropolitan Museum of Art, New York. His still-life paintings have been said to be "important for the history of still-life painting in both Italy and Spain". Among Cavarozzi's finest work is a painting of Saint Jerome with Two Angels, which was purchased in 1617 by the Medici in Florence. The training Cavarozzi received at Crescenzi's academy can be seen in the still life with skull, rosary, books, and crucifix on the worm-eaten table. Also evident is Caravaggio's style in the remarkable handling of light in the Saint Jerome painting. One author suggested Cavarozzi was the painter known as the Master of the Acquavella Still Life, one of the finest still-life painters of early seventeenth-century Rome, but, this attribution is not universally accepted.

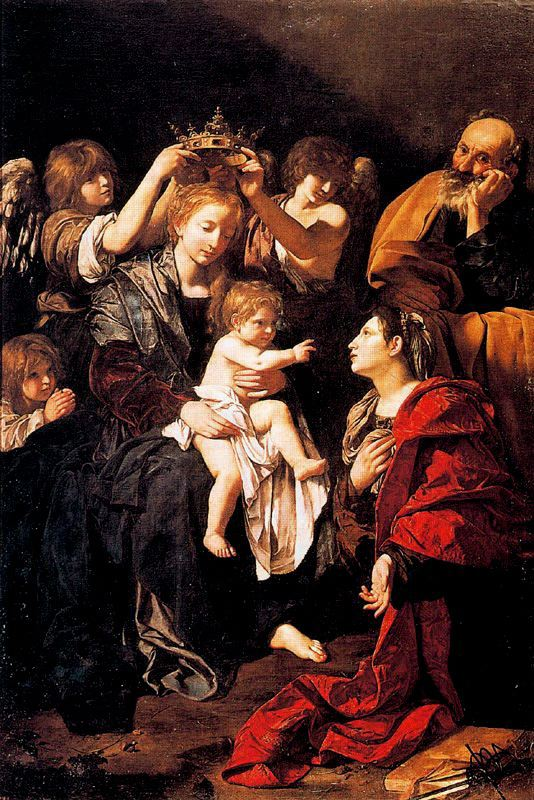
The Holy Family with Saint Catherine of Alexandria (1618) oil on canvas (256 x 170 cm) Prado Museum, Madrid.

In 1617 Giovanni Battista Crescenzi traveled to Spain to work in the Pantheon of the Escorial and in this period he was significant in defining artistic taste in the Madrid court. Crescenzi brought Cavarozzi with him to Spain where they worked for approximately two years. The paintings Cavarozzi produced in Spain show Caravaggio's use of naturalistic figures in raking light and darkness however, he developed a distinguishing style of his own, which among other things was less inclined toward drama and leaning more to tender and reserved figures. The Holy Family with Saint Catherine of Alexandria (1618) in the Prado Museum, Madrid dates from Cavarozzi's time in Spain.

Some have observed the influence of Cavarozzi in the early works of the Spanish painter Jusepe de Ribera, who conversely would have seen Cavarozzi's work in Italy, just before or about the time Cavarozzi left for Spain. Included among these are some of Ribera's paintings of Saints and particularly in The Calvary (Crucifixion) [see external links below] in the Patronato de Arte Osuna, Seville: "A striking similarity can be found in the figure of Mary Magdalen – especially in the treatment of her luxurious green and yellow clothing – to the style of the Roman artist Bartolomeo Cavarozzi (ca. 1590–1625) in the years immediately prior to his trip to Spain (1617–18)".

Cavarozzi returned to Rome in 1619. He was active in Rome and in his home town of Viterbo where he produced a painting of Saint Isidore for the Chiesa Collegiata di Sant'Angelo in Spata, and in 1622 his painting of the Visitation was installed in Viterbo which now hangs in the Town Hall chapel. He is known to have coped his own work, and in the case of one painting of the Holy Family "almost ad nauseam". He died in Rome on 21 September 1625 at the relatively young age of thirty-eight.

Other works include a San Silvestro for the Church of the Confraternity of Jesus; a St Phillip Apostle for the Church of San Pietro del Castagno; a St Benedict for the lateral door of the Church of Monasterio della Duchessa; a Presentation at the Temple for the Church of the College of Doctors, and also painted a canvas for the Chapel of the Calabresi family in the church of Sant'Ignazio. A contemporary from Viterbo, Filippo Caparozzi, was a disciple of Giuseppe d'Arpino.

== Gallery ==
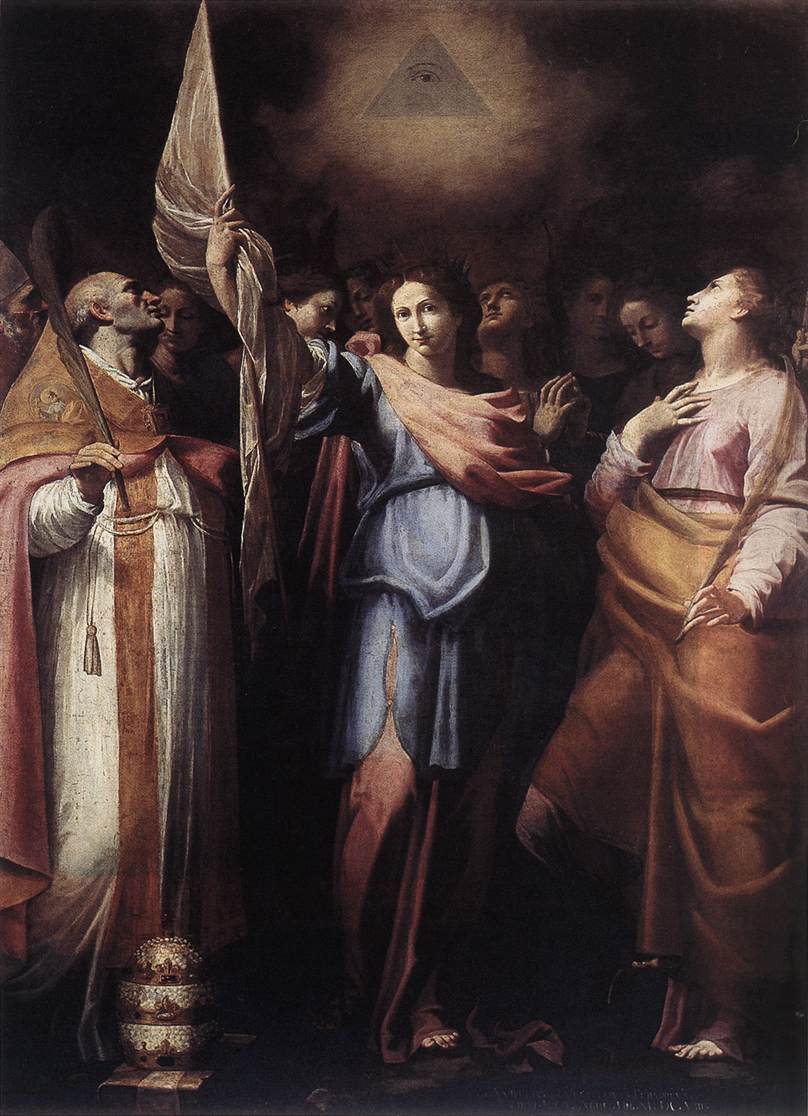
Earliest known work: St. Ursula and Her Companions with Pope Ciriacus and St Catherine of Alexandria (1608) oil on canvas (110.2 x 86.6 in.) Basilica of St. Mark the Evangelist, Rome

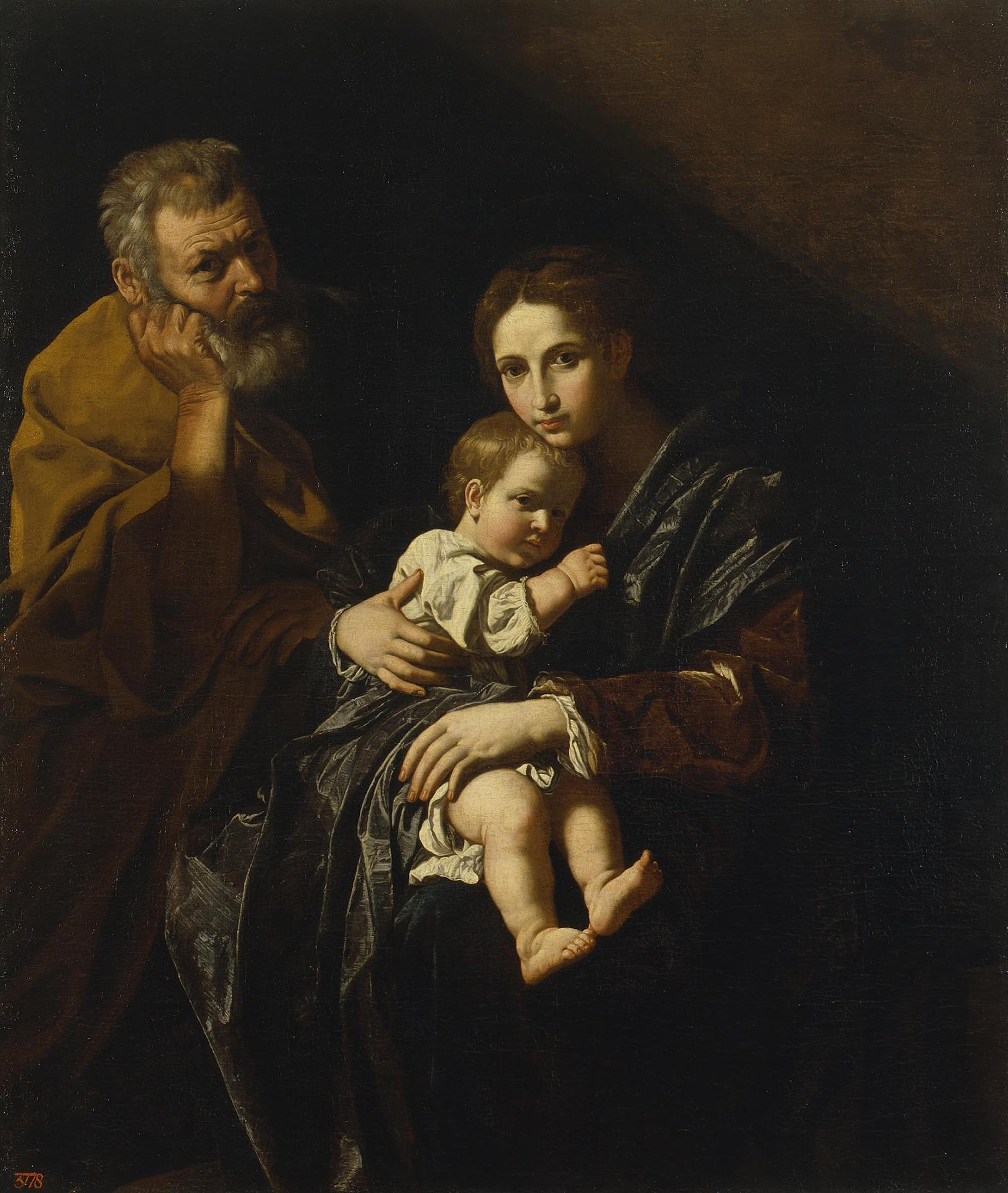
Holy Family (ca. 1617 - 1625) oil on canvas (56.4 x 47.6 in.) Hermitage Museum, Saint Petersburg

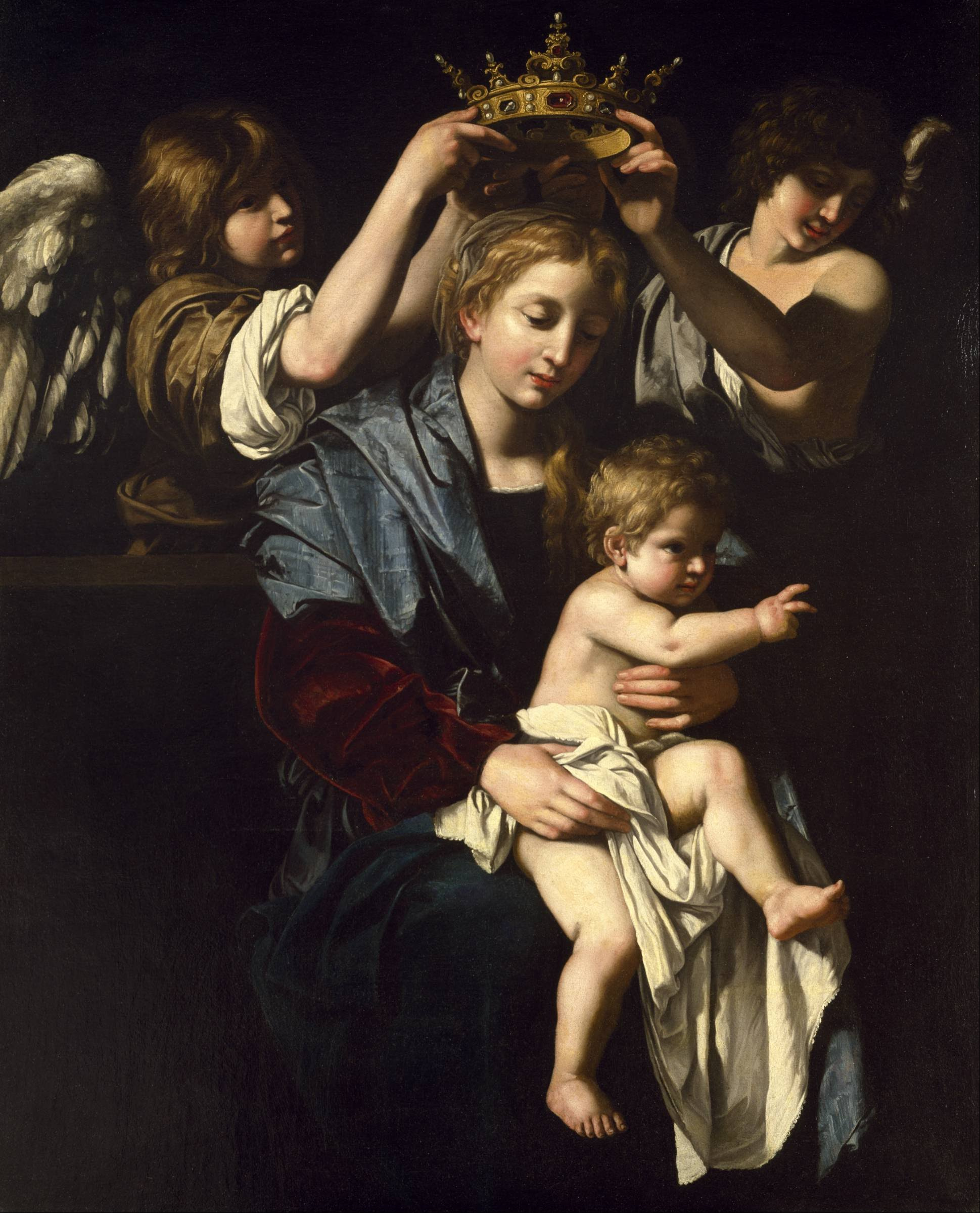
Virgin and Child with Angels (ca. 1620), oil on canvas ( 61 × 49 in), Museum of Fine Arts, Houston

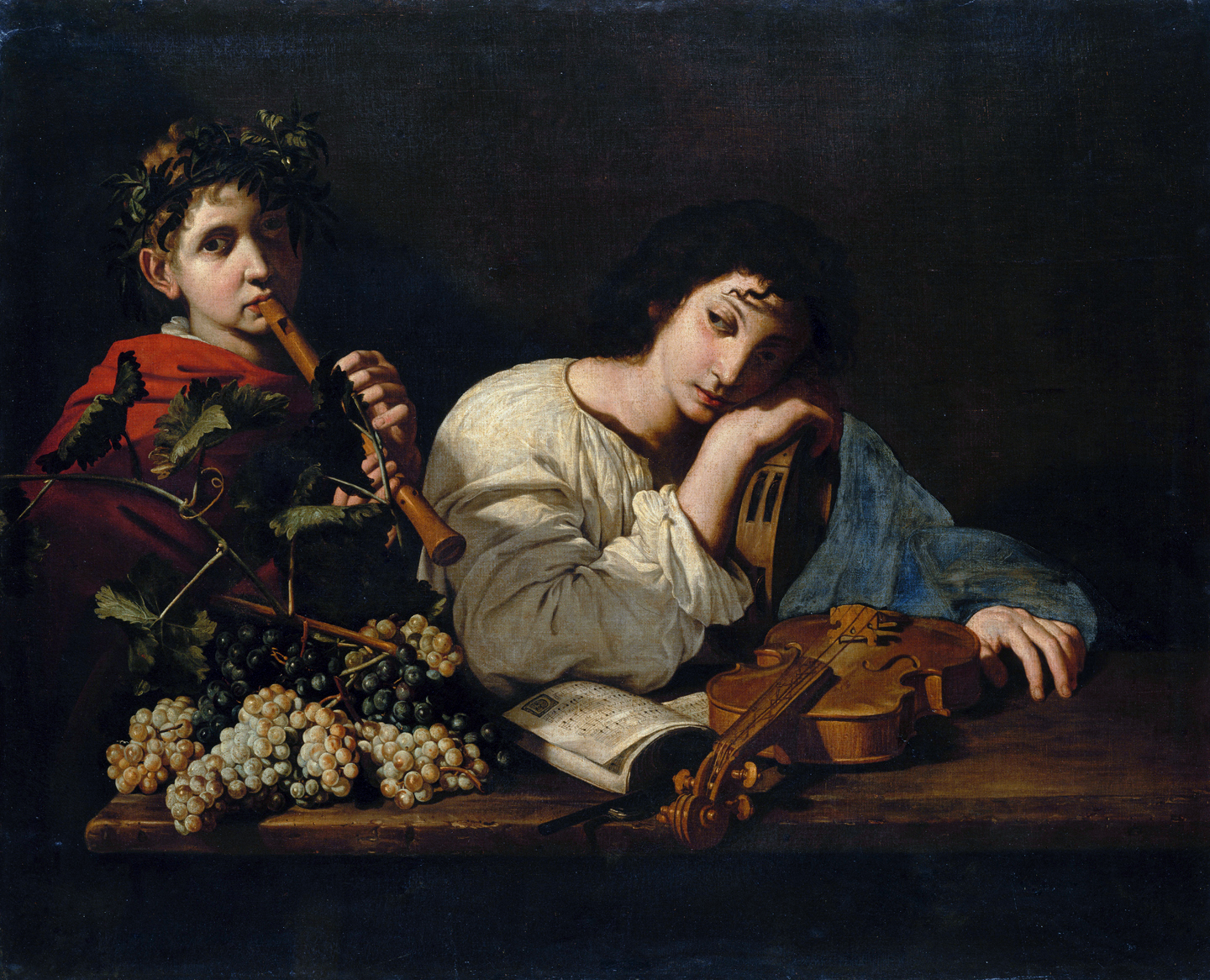
Aminta's Lament (ca. 1625), oil on canvas (39 x 47 in.) Louvre, Paris

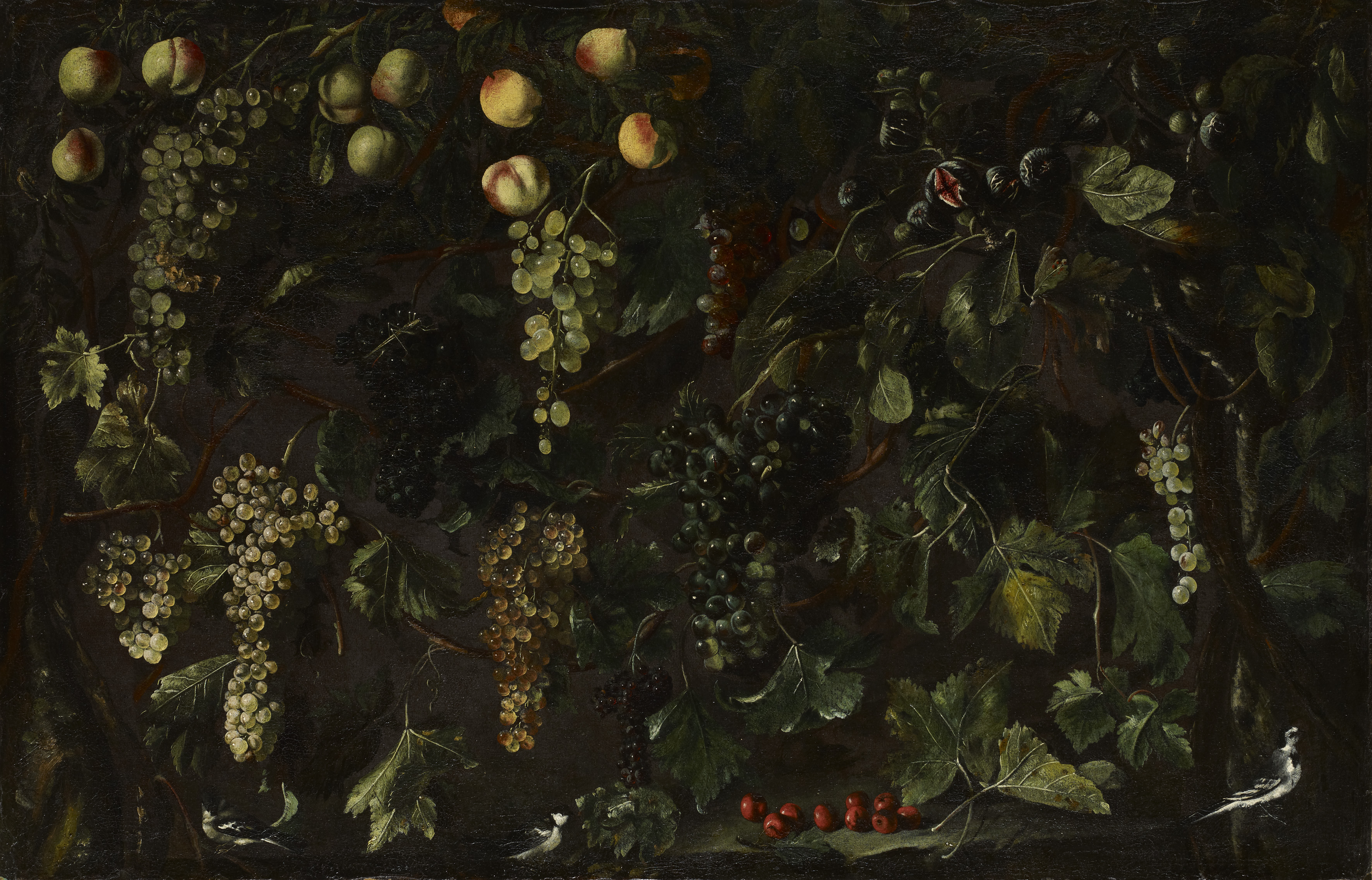
Grape Vines and Fruit, with Three Wagtailsca (ca. 1615) oil on canvas (40 × 61 3/4 in. /101.6 × 156.8 cm) Metropolitan Museum of Art, New York

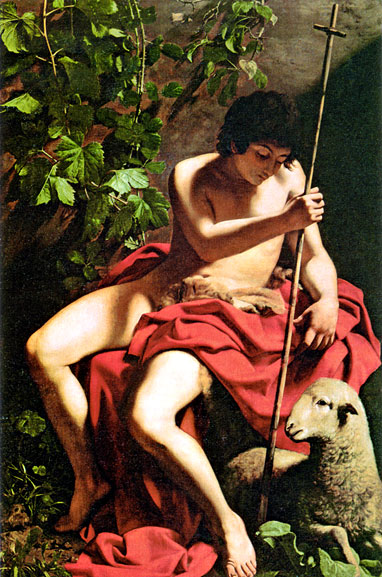
Saint John the Baptist, oil on canvas, Sacristy of the Cathedral of Toledo. This painting is sometimes attributed to Caravaggio.

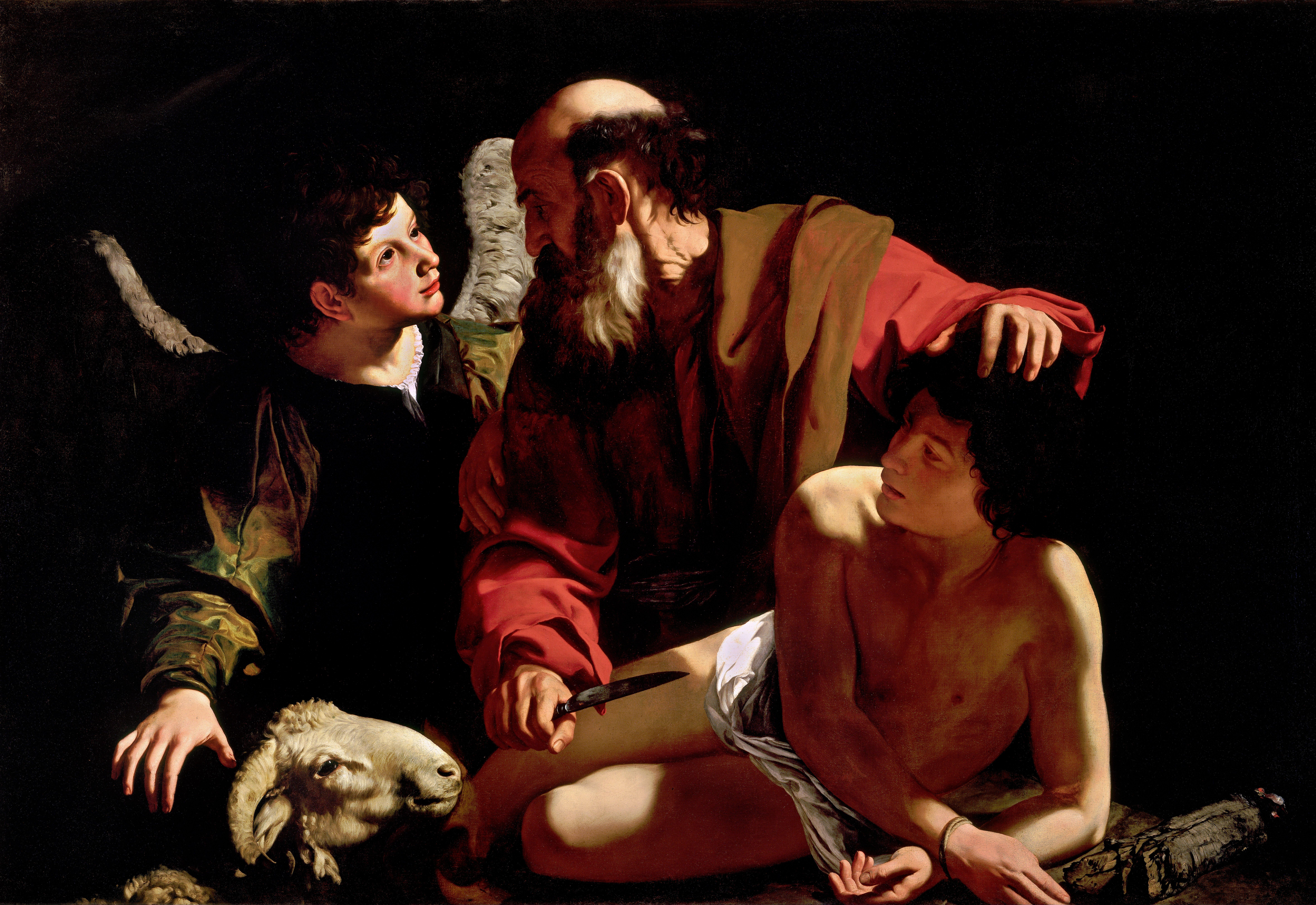
Sacrifice of Isaac, oil on canvas (45.6 x 68.1 / 116 x 173 cm). This painting is sometimes attributed to Caravaggio.

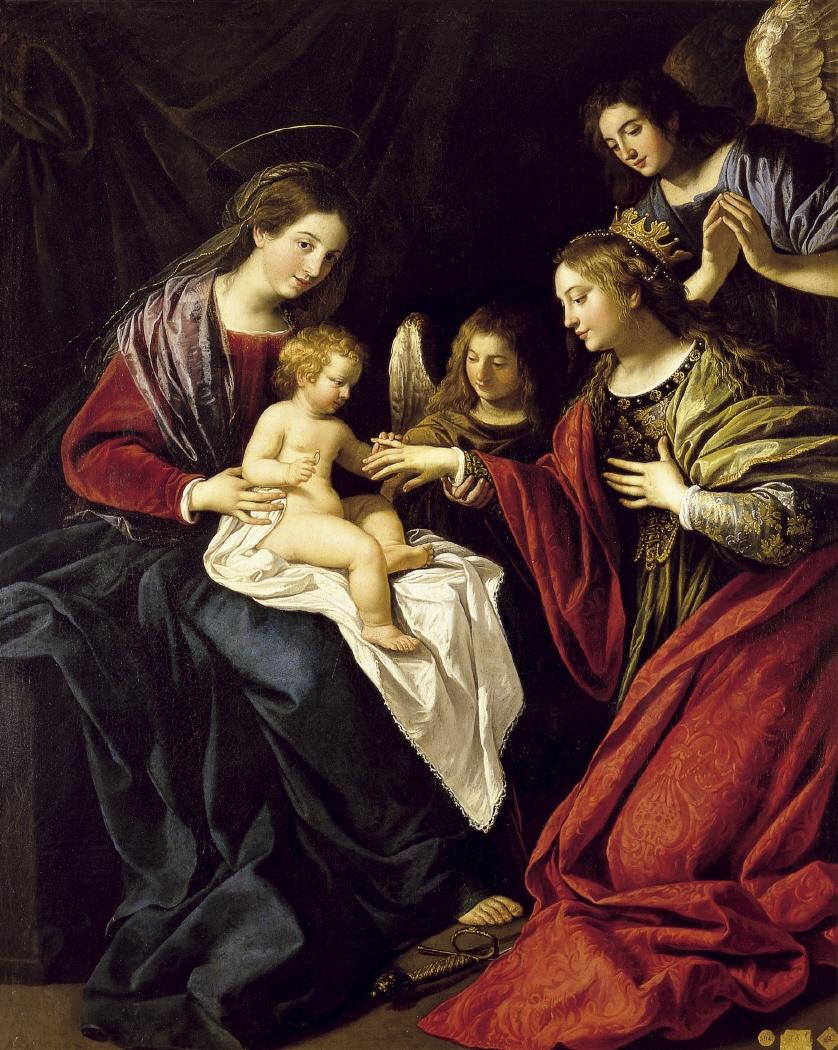
Mystical Betrothal of Saint Catherine, oil on canvas (189 x 150 cm). The Real Academia de Bellas Artes de San Fernando, Madrid.

== Works ==
- St Ursula and Her Companions with Pope Ciriacus and St Catherine of Alexandria (1608, San Marco, Rome), size: 256 x 17 cm.
- Guardian Angel (Ángel guardián) (Museo Nacional de Bellas Artes, Buenos Aires)
- Aminta's Lament (1614–15, private collection)
- Saint Jerome and the Angels (1617, Palatine Gallery inside Palazzo Pitti, Florence), size: 116 x 173 cm.
- Holy Family (Accademia Albertina, Turin)
- Virgin and Child (Museum of the Duomo di Viterbo)
- Holy Family with Saint Catherine (c. 1618, Museo del Prado, Madrid), size: 256 x 170 cm.
- Virgin and Child with Angels (ca. 1620), oil on canvas ( 61 × 49 in), Museum of Fine Arts, Houston
- Virgen con el niño (c. 1618, Colegio de Doncellas Nobles, Toledo)
- The Supper at Emmaus (c. 1615–25), attributed
- Young Violinist (Louvre, Paris)
- Young Violinist (Parelari Collection, Bergamo)
- Visitation (1622, Palazzo Comunale, Viterbo)
- Saint Cecilia
- Saint Jerome (Palazzo Margherita, Rome), attributed

== Bibliography ==
- Stirling-Maxwell, William (1891). Annals of the Artists of Spain (Volume II). London: John C. Nimmo. p. 562.
- Pérez Sánchez, Alfonso E. Borgianni, Cavarozzi y Nardi en España, Madrid, Instituto Diego Velázquez, CSIC, 1964, p. 22
- Daniele Sanguineti Bartolomeo Cavarozzi: sacre famiglie a confronto, Ed. Skira (2005)
- Marieke von Bernstorff. Kunstbetrieb und Malerei im frühen 17. Jahrhundert. Der Fall Giovan Battista Crescenzi und Bartolomeo Cavarozzi. (Roman studies at the Hertziana Library, Volume 28), Munich, 2010
- Papi, Gianni (2015) Bartolomeo Cavarozzi 1587–1625. Edizioni dei Soncino, Soncino. 325 pp. (Italian text) ISBN 8890964324. This is the first and only monograph on Cavarozzi as of 2019.
