= Master of the Acquavella Still-Life =

Italian painter

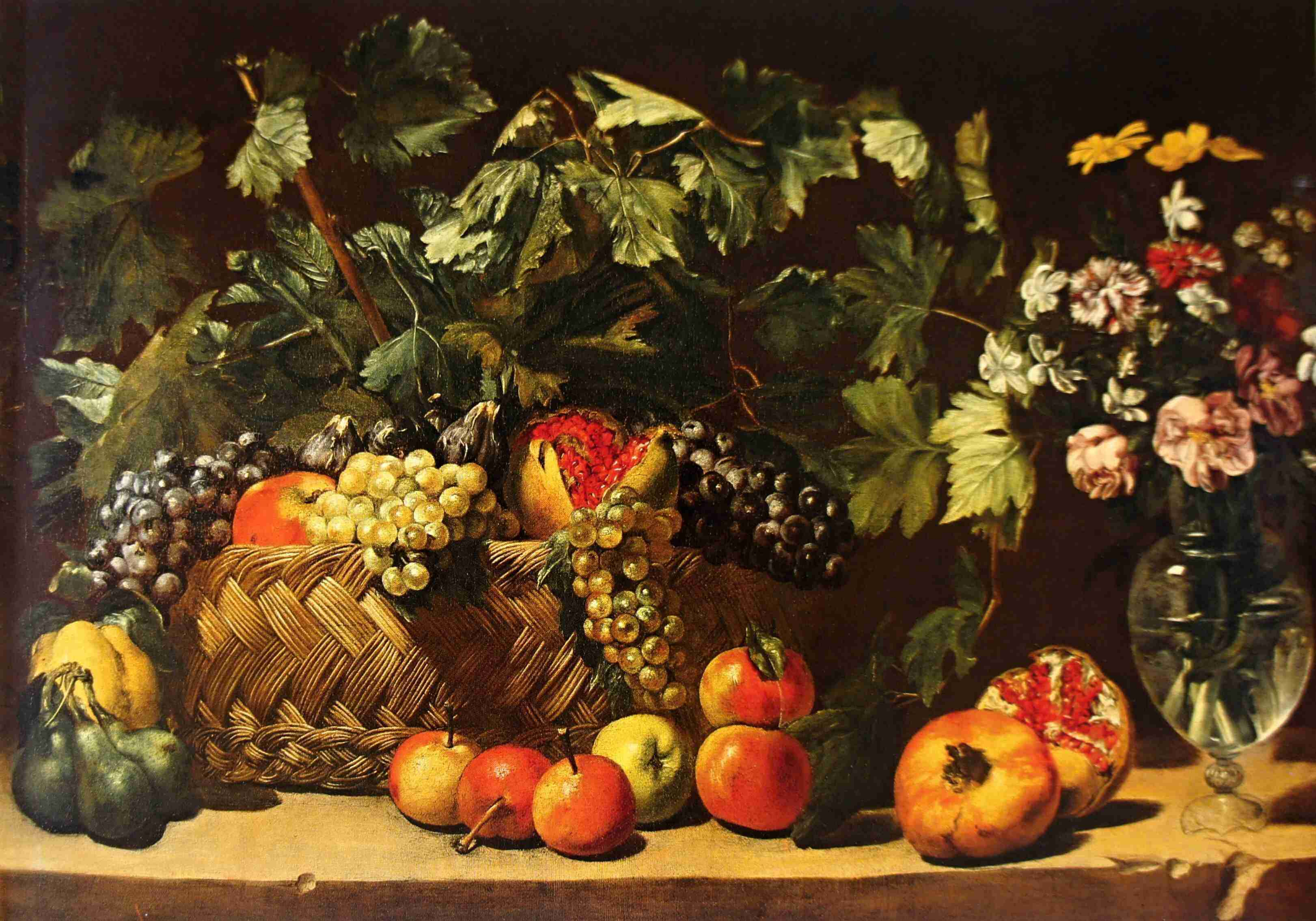
Still life with a basket of fruit, pears, apples, pomegranates and a vase of flowers

The Master of the Acquavella Still-Life is the notname given to an unknown Baroque painter who was active in Rome during the 1610s and 1620s and specialized in still-lifes. The Master is regarded as one of the leading still life painters of this period and an important representative of the Caravaggesque style in still life painting.

== Oeuvre ==
He was given the notname after one of his works, the Still life with a basket of fruit, pears, apples, pomegranates and a vase of flowers, formerly in the collection of the Acquavella Gallery in New York and subsequently in the Galleria Lorenzelli collection in Bergamo. Other still lifes with the same style, themes and techniques as this work have been attributed to the master.

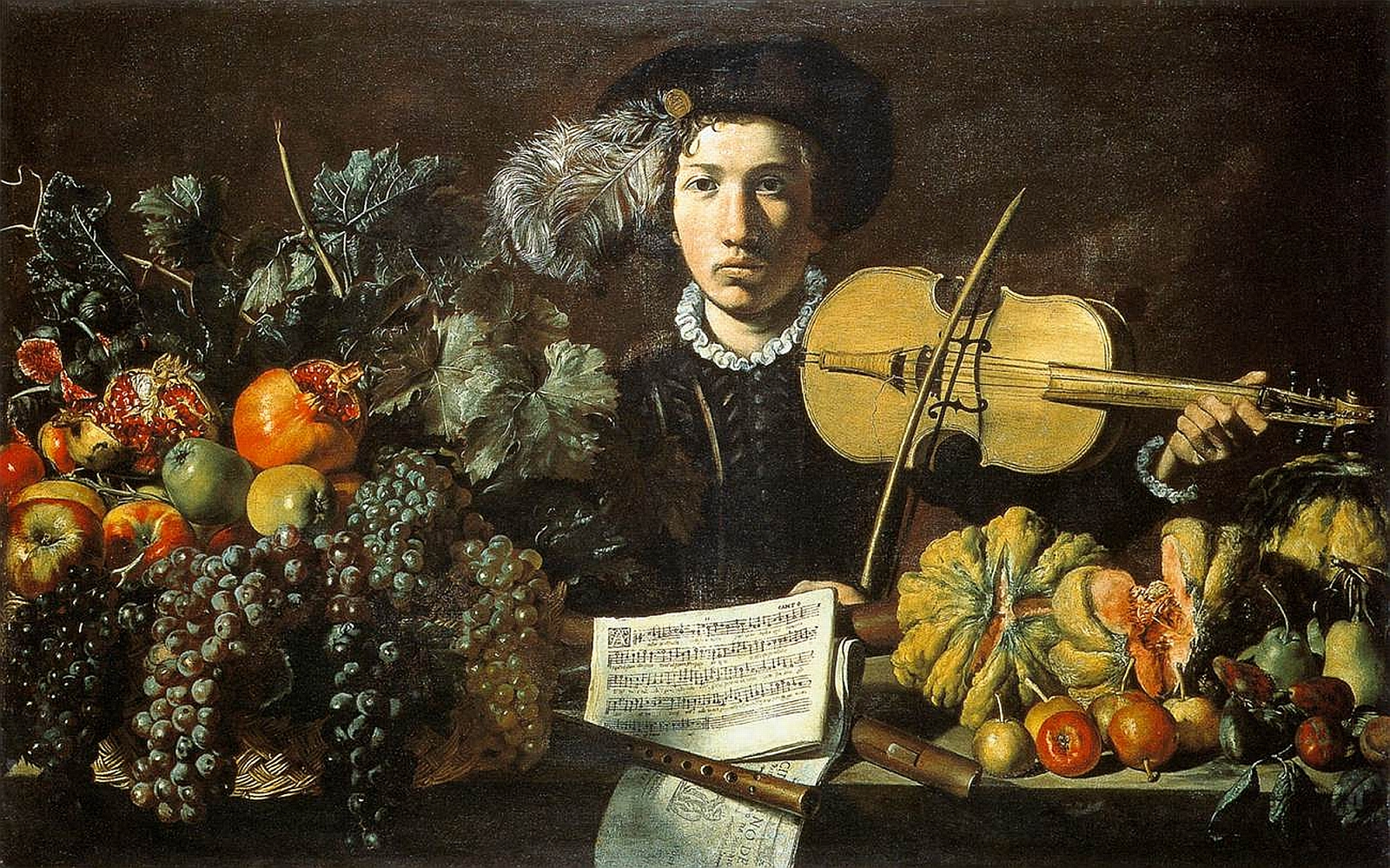
Still-life with a Violinist

He painted with a remarkable attention to detail and filled his canvases with flowers and fruits which almost seem to burst out of the frame. The unusual crowding of elements to the extreme edge of the composition imbues his still lifes with dynamic tension. Another recurrent feature of most of the paintings is the presence of the lush vine leaves. The Master treats these leaves in a more realistic manner than his contemporaries who paid more attention to the fruit and flowers. Other regular features are the depiction of fruit baskets and the chipping of the stone slab on which the still lifes are displayed.

His work is characteristic of Italian still life painting at the turn of the seventeenth century and incorporates the innovations to the genre introduced by Caravaggio. Leading contemporary still life painters include the Master of the Hartford Still-Life and the Pensionante del Saraceni. The Acquavella Master was the more innovative of these artists as he moved the still life format away from the standard table arrangement and developed a fuller compositional arrangement. These innovations greatly influenced the next generation of still life painters such as Giovan Battista Ruoppolo, Michelangelo di Campidoglio and Michelangelo Cerquozzi.

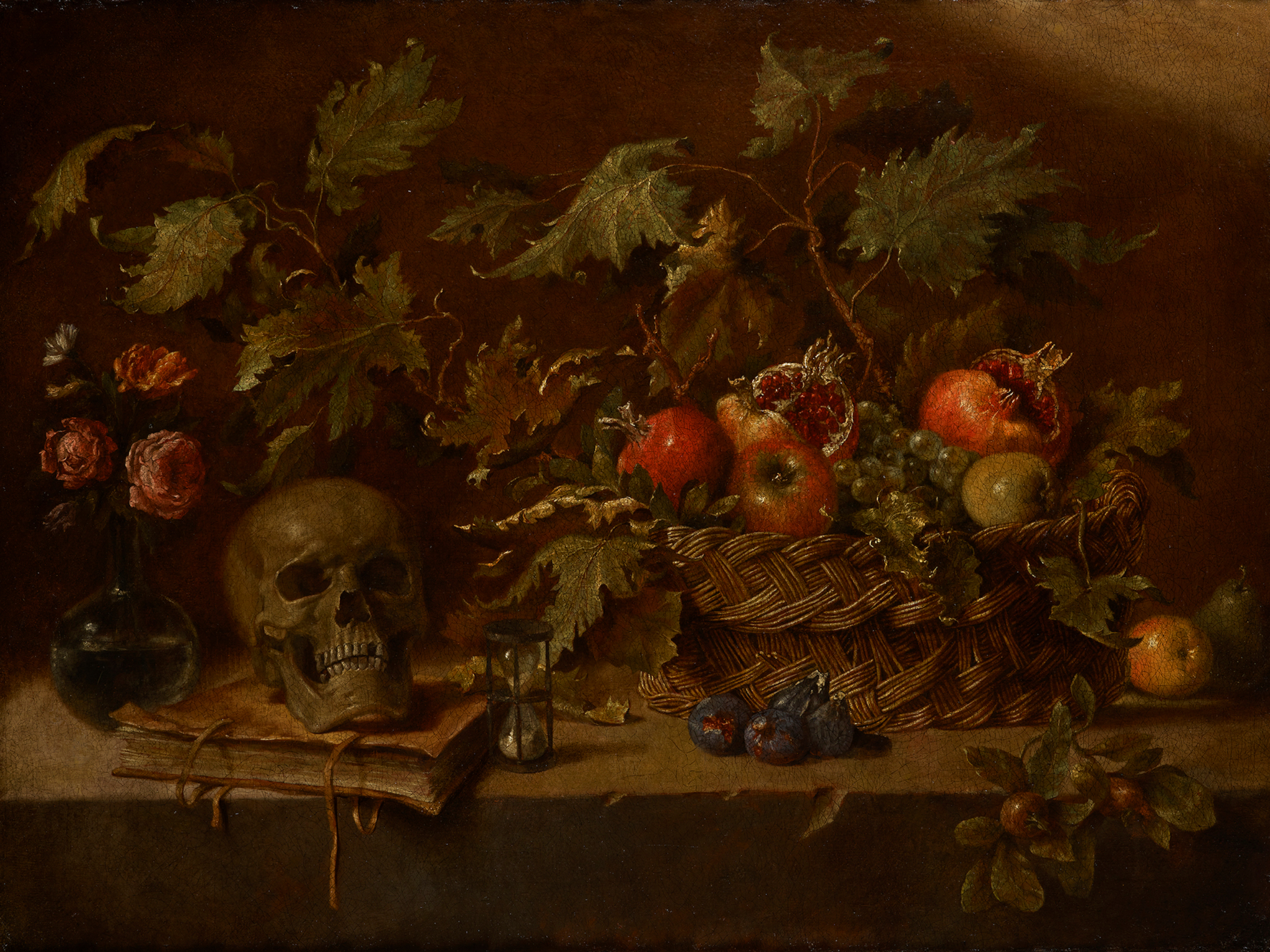
Still life with a fruit basket and vanitas

He regularly collaborated with figure painters. A collaborations with Bartolomeo Cavarozzi has been suggested in the Lament of Aminta (1610–1615, three versions of which one in the Philadelphia Museum of Art and another in the Louvre, Paris).

== Identification ==
Various art historians have proposed identifications for the anonymous Master. The proposed artists include Luca Forte, Angelo Caroselli, Giovanni Battista Crescenzi, Pietro Paolini, Artemisia Gentileschi and Bartolomeo Cavarozzi.

The identification is made more difficult by the fact that most of his works are in private collections.
