= Fontana di San Faustino =

Fountain in Viterbo

Coordinates: 42.42048°N 12.10360°E

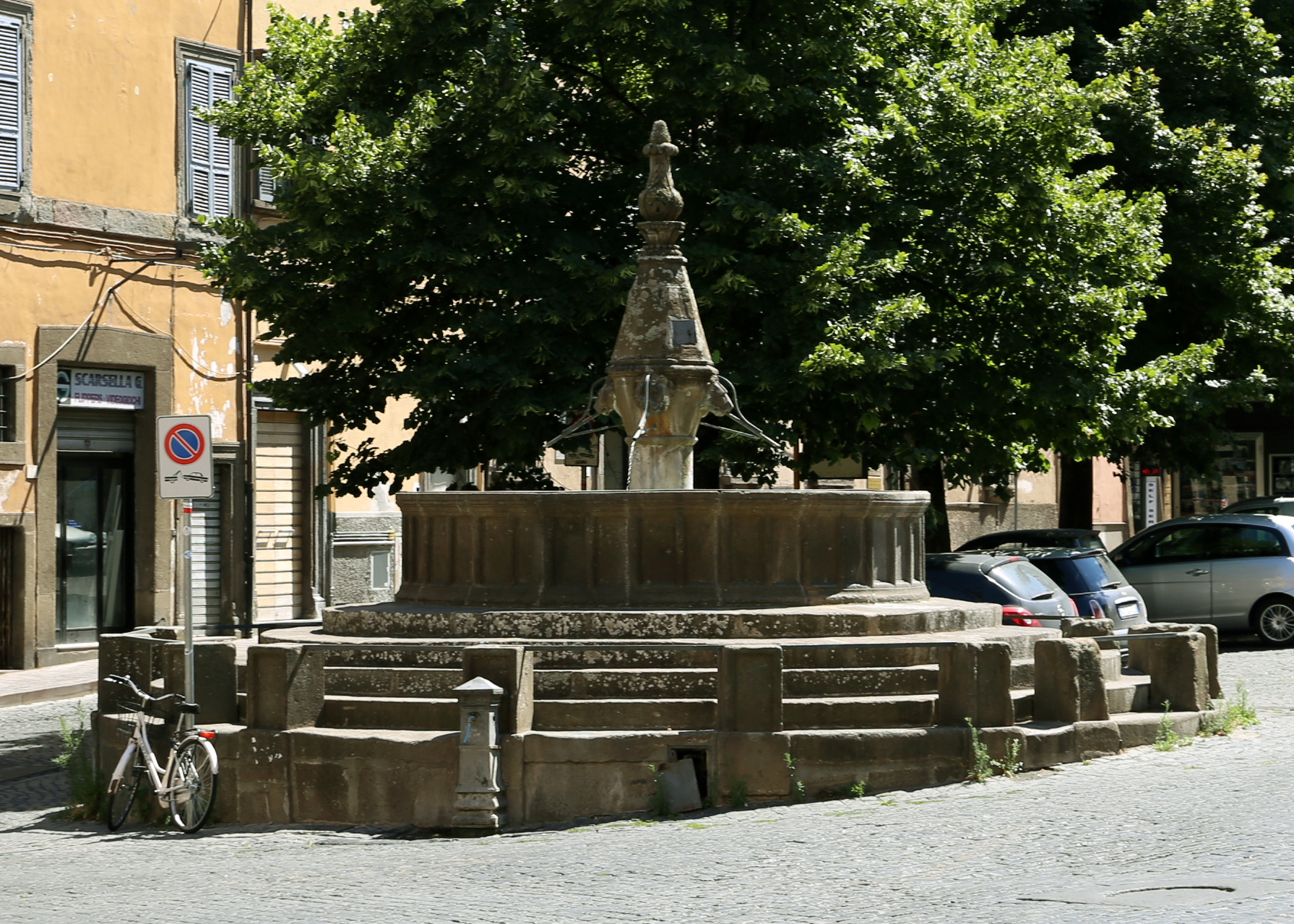
Fontana di San Faustino

The Fontana di San Faustino is a medieval fountain located Piazza San Faustino, in front of the parish church of Santi Faustino e Giovita, in the historic center of Viterbo, region of Lazio, Italy.

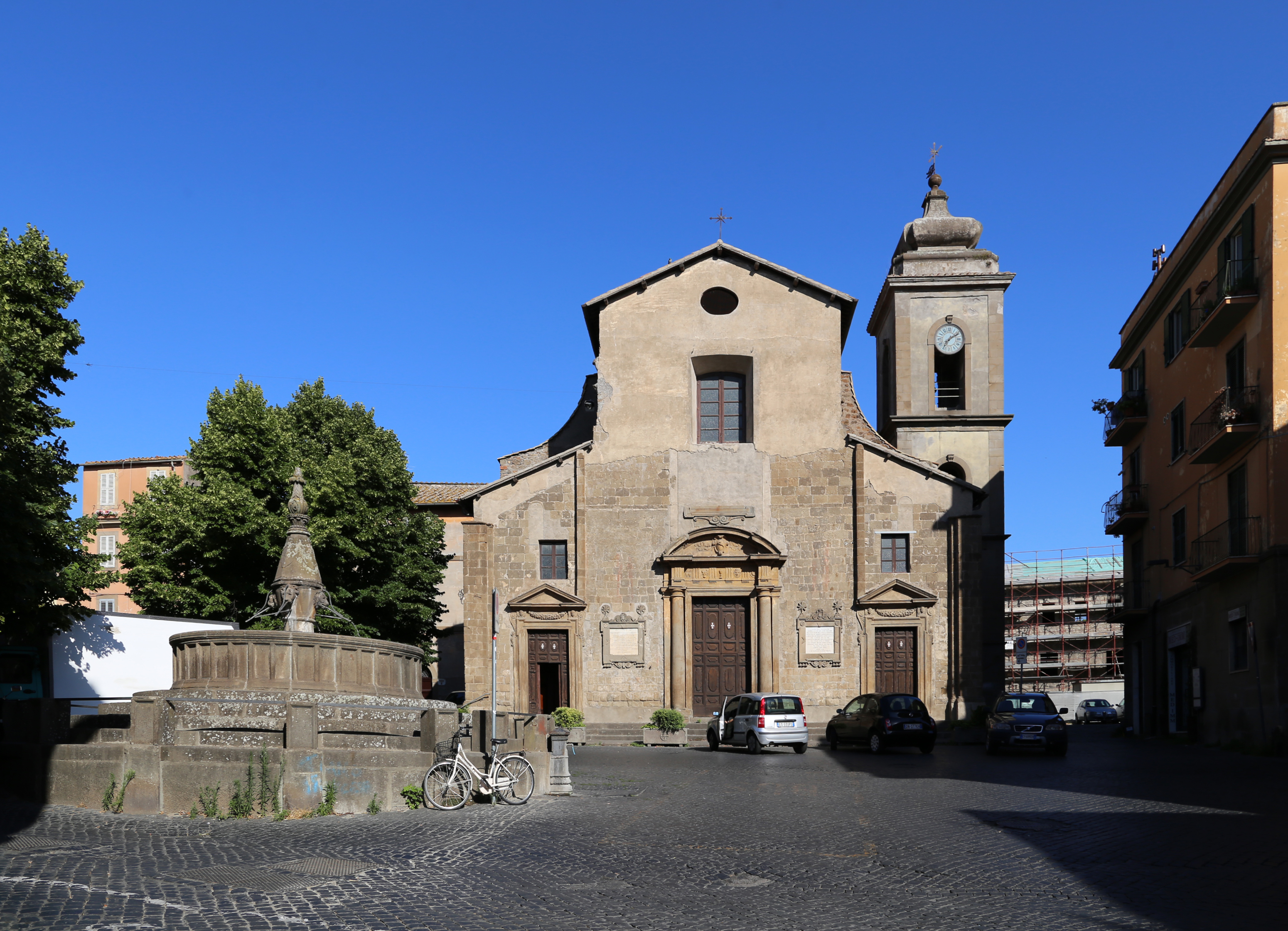
The fountain and the church of Santi Faustino e Giovita in background

A fountain was erected at this site by 1251, in an area only enclosed by city walls in 1210, and settled by many displaced from the destruction of Ferentium in 1172. The fountain was commissioned by the neighbors. An inscription between the sculpted heads of a lion below the spire bears the names of the masons. The fountain has been restored over the centuries.
