= Master of the Hartford Still-Life =

Italian painter

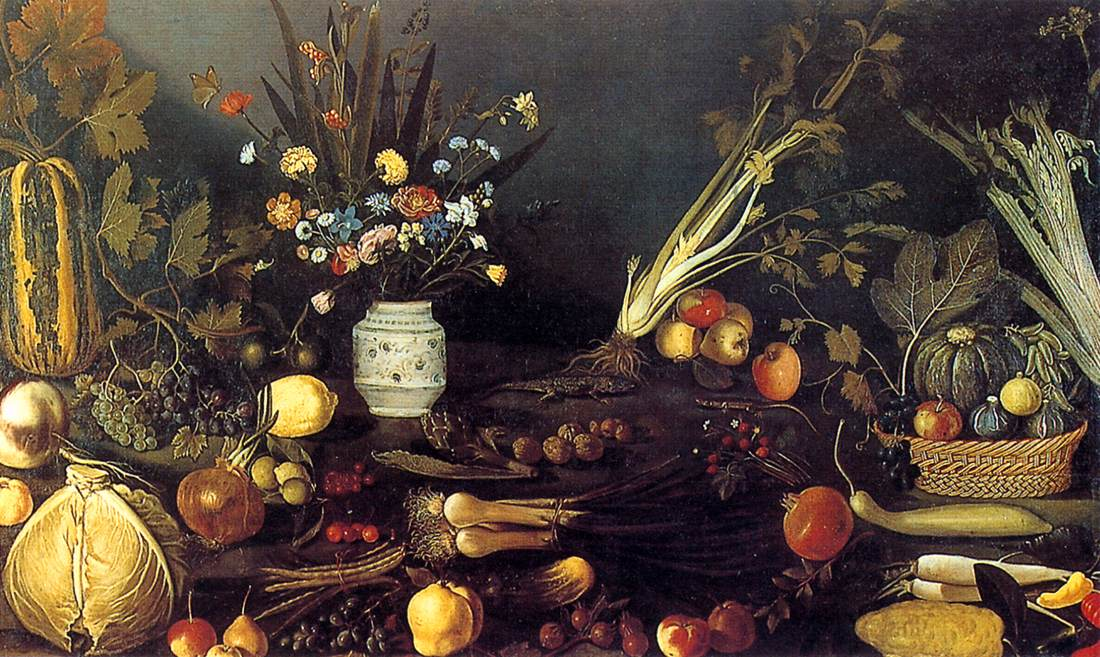
Flowers, Fruits, Vegetables and Two Lizards

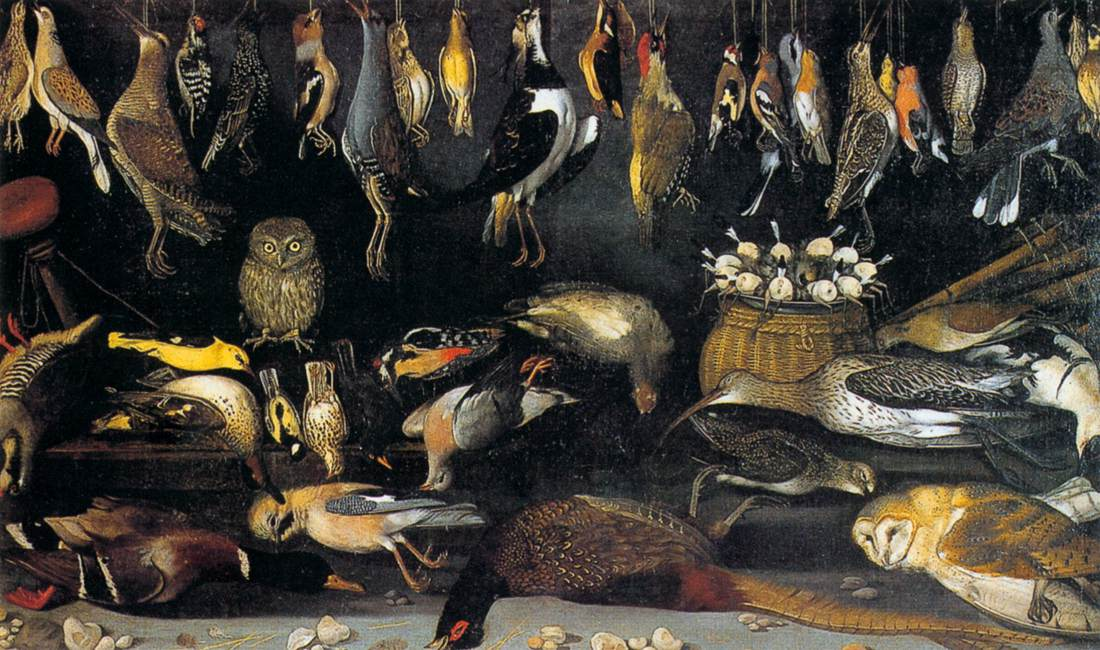
Still-life with Birds

The Master of the Hartford Still-Life or simply the Master of Hartford was an Italian painter in the Baroque style who worked in Rome from the 1590s to the 1610s and specialized in lavish still-lifes. Together with the Master of the Acquavella Still-Life, he helped establish a brighter style for the Italian still-life, as opposed to the prevailing dark style of the Netherlands.

== Works ==
His notname is derived from a still-life with flower and fruits, on a table, kept at the Wadsworth Atheneum in Hartford, Connecticut. By comparing this painting with similar ones, a style group was created.

Certain elements reminiscent of Caravaggio have been detected. Suggestions that these are by the young Caravaggio himself are reasonable, given the similarity of his lighting effects, but it seems more reasonable to assume that he was one of Caravaggio's students.

Three painters have received serious consideration as being this Master; Francesco Zucchi (?-1621), Bernardino Cesari and Giovanni Battista Crescenzi. Other works in the group assigned to him include flower still lifes in the gallery of the Palazzo Comunale in Spoleto and the Galleria Borghese, a fruit still-life at the Museum Kunstpalast in Düsseldorf and an unusual bird still-life, also at the Galleria Borghese. Others are in private collections.
