= San Rocco, Viterbo =

Italian church

Coordinates: 42.41956°N 12.10862°E

San Rocco is a deconsecrated Baroque-style, former-Roman Catholic church located on the Piazza of the same name in central Viterbo, region of Lazio, Italy. The church is dedicated to Saint Roch, known mainly as the patron saint of those afflicted with illness, specially the bubonic plague. Since Viterbo stood along a pilgrimage route to Rome, many ill pilgrims would find rest and care in hospitals and hospices along the route, tended by confraternities, some of which took the name of this saint.

== History and description ==
The history of this church and the confraternity is not well recorded in published sources: Both Feliciano Busi in 1742 and Gaetano Coretini in 1749 mention, in almost identical paragraph, that this as one of the churches owned by lay confraternities, this one distinguished by the green cloak who ambled through the town and surrounding territory with litters seeking to collect the infirm poor and lead them to the Ospedale Grande, if not tending to their burial. Another source suggests the church was erected in the mid 16th-century, after a plague epidemic in Viterbo.

The mention the church had a second church dedicated to the Assumption of the Virgin. It is not clear if this confraternity was the same as tended the distinct church of San Rocco is located on Viale Fiume #35, in the frazione of Bagnaia, built in 1569, and rebuilt in the 17th century. In 1934 the commune of Bagnaia transformed the church in to a Sacrario dei Caduti (Chapel for the Fallen).

The outside of the church has some peculiar (for a church) decorations for windows and the main portal, including caryatid reliefs, possibly from the 17th century. Judging from the original inventories of the interior of the church, much of the decoration derives from the 17th century, although now dispersed, with some in the Civic Museum of Viterbo. These include a Crucifixxion with St Charles by Filippo Caparozzi. a St Jerome and the Lion attributed to Cavaliere d'Arpino; an Assumption of the Virgin by Angelo Pucciati; and a Glory of the Virgin and a Birth of the Virgin Mary by Giovanni Francesco Romanelli, painted between 1648 and 1649. Some of the internal frescoes and stucco-work still exists, though needing restoration. The church was deconsecrated in the 19th century, and for a time hosted a carpentry shop. The property in 2023 was privately owned.
