= Ferentium (diocese) =

Roman Catholic titular see

Coordinates: 42.4886°N 12.1325°E

Diocese of Ferentium is a former bishopric (now titular see) with capital in town Ferentium near Viterbo (in Lazio, Central Italy), which absorbed it.

== History ==
Diocese Ferentium was established around 400 AD. In 700 AD, the diocese was suppressed and its territory annexed to the Diocese of Bomarzo.

== Titular see ==
In 1970, the old diocese was nominally restored as a Latin titular see.

It has had the following incumbents, of both the lowest (episcopal) and intermediate (archiepiscopal) ranks:

- Titular Archbishop José García y Goldaraz (1970.07.02 – 1970.12.11)
- Titular Bishop Biagio Vittorio Terrinoni, Capuchin Friars (O.F.M. Cap.) (1971.04.17 – 1977.04.22)
- Titular Bishop Remigio Ragonesi (1977.05.27 – 1991.07.06 see below), an Auxiliary Bishop of the Vicariate of Rome
- Titular Archbishop Remigio Ragonesi (see above 1991.07.06 – 2000.03.22), the Vicegerent for the Vicariate of Rome
- Titular Archbishop Antonio Mennini, Apostolic Nuncio to the UK (Great Britain) (2000.07.08 – ...)

== Source and External links ==
- GigaCatholic, with titular incumbent biography links
