= Sante Orsola e Caterina =

Church in Rome, Italy

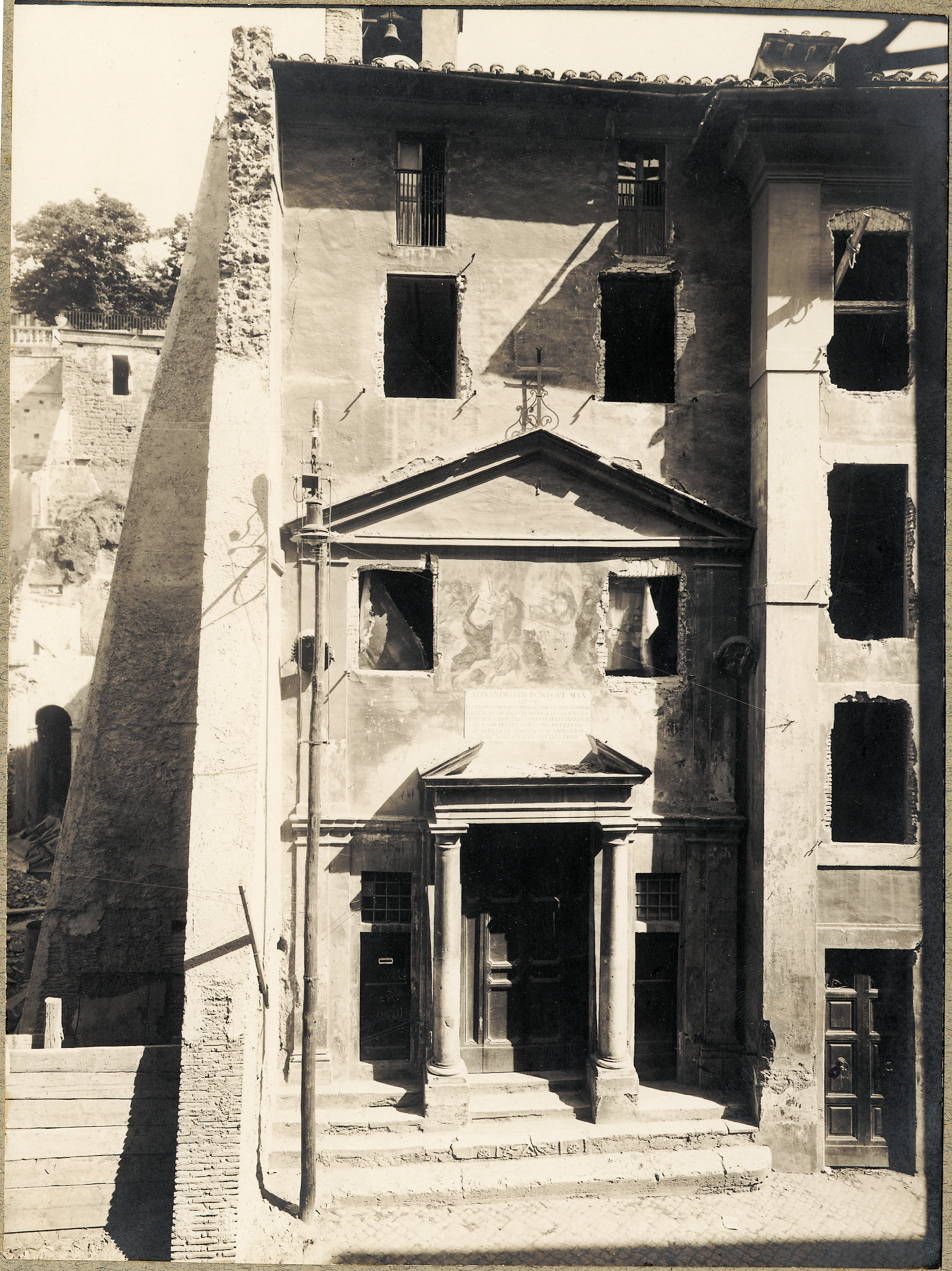
Photograph of the facade of the church

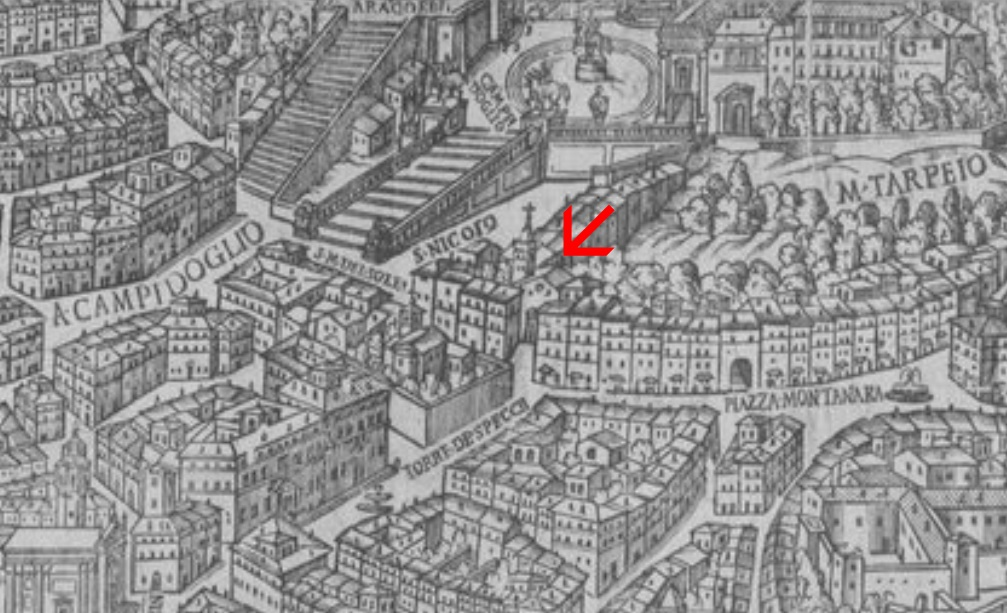
Arrow points to its location on a 1625 map near the base of the steps to the Campidoglio

Sante Orsola e Caterina was a small Roman Catholic confraternity church located near a convent found in Tor de' Specchi, on the western slopes of the Campidoglio, in the rione Campitelli of Rome, Italy. The church was torn down to make space for a highway.

The church was built at the site of a parish church once called San Niccolò de Funari. The church was transferred to a confraternity, made archconfraternity under Clement X, and rededicated to St Ursula and St Catherine, and rebuilt under the designs of Carlo de Dominicis.
