= Ferento Roman Theater =

Ancient Roman theater in Lazio, Italy

Coordinates: 42.48845°N 12.13215°E

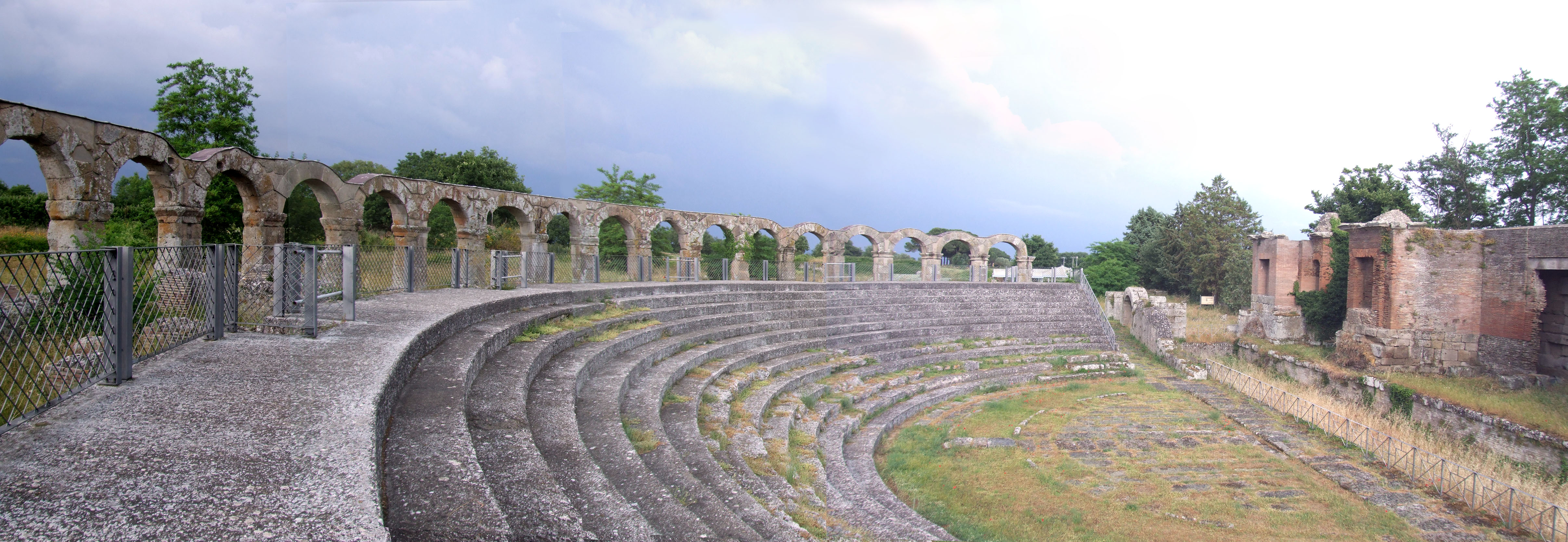
View of the theater seating and arcade

The Ferento Roman Theater (Italian: Ferento Teatro Romano) is an ancient Roman theater in Ferentium, province of Viterbo, region of Lazio, Italy. It was built in the 1st century AD near the decumanus of ancient Ferentium. The theater went into decline after the fall of the Western Roman Empire. The medieval town of Ferentium underwent further decline after its destruction by Viterbo in 1172. The structure is still used in the summer for open-air concerts, representations and other spectacles.

== Remains ==
The theater was excavated in the 19th-century. The tiers of its semicircular stone seating are well-preserved and a surrounding brick arcade has been partially restored. The stage area and the remains of the backdrop, known as the scaenae frons, are still visible. The theater could accommodate around 3,000 spectators. Adjacent to the ruin are remnants of ancient Roman baths and a temple.
