= Filippo Caparozzi =

Italian painter

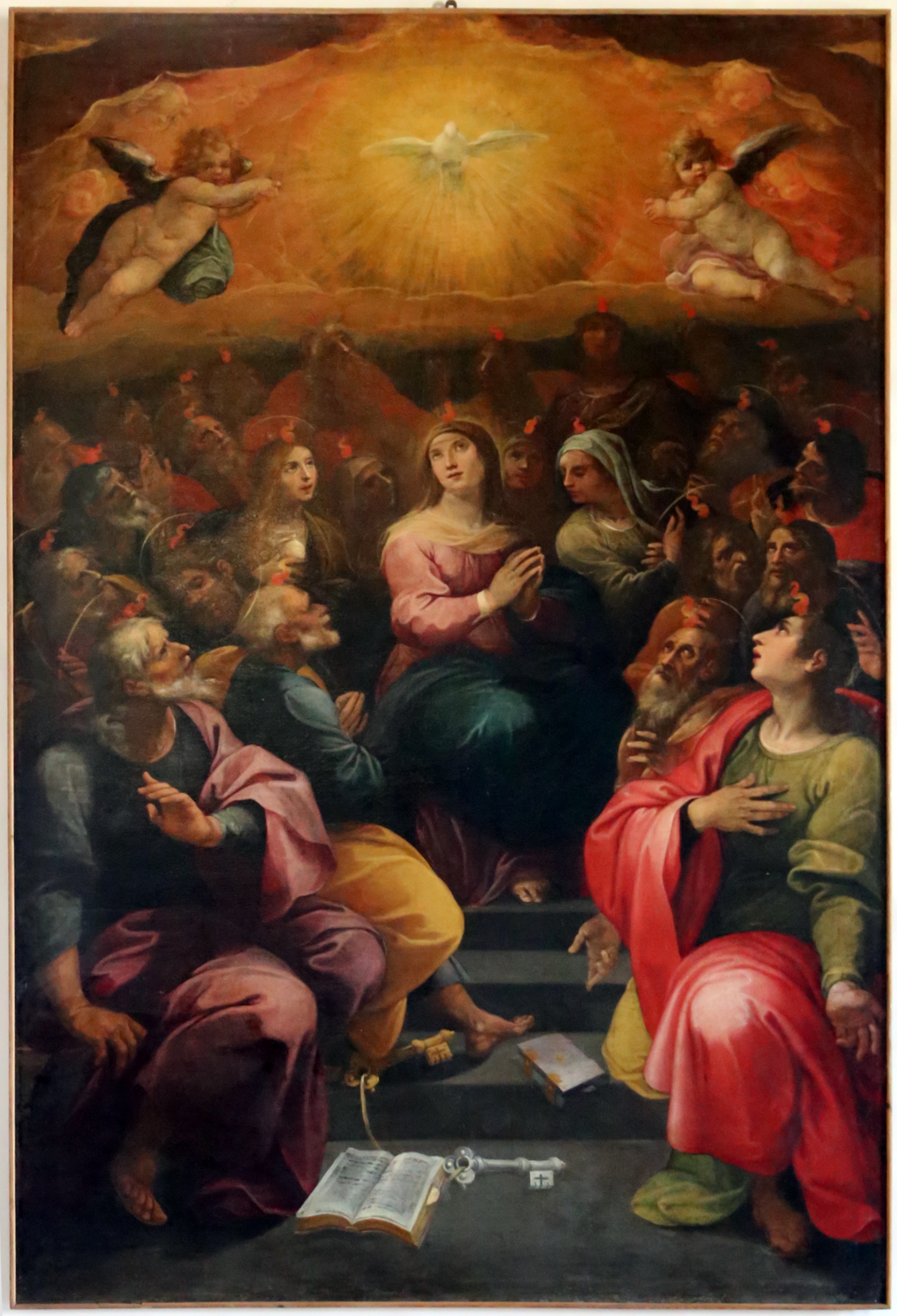
Pentecost, Palazzo dei Papi di Viterbo

Filippo Cavarozzi was an Italian Mannerist painter of the Baroque period, active mainly in Viterbo.

== Biography ==
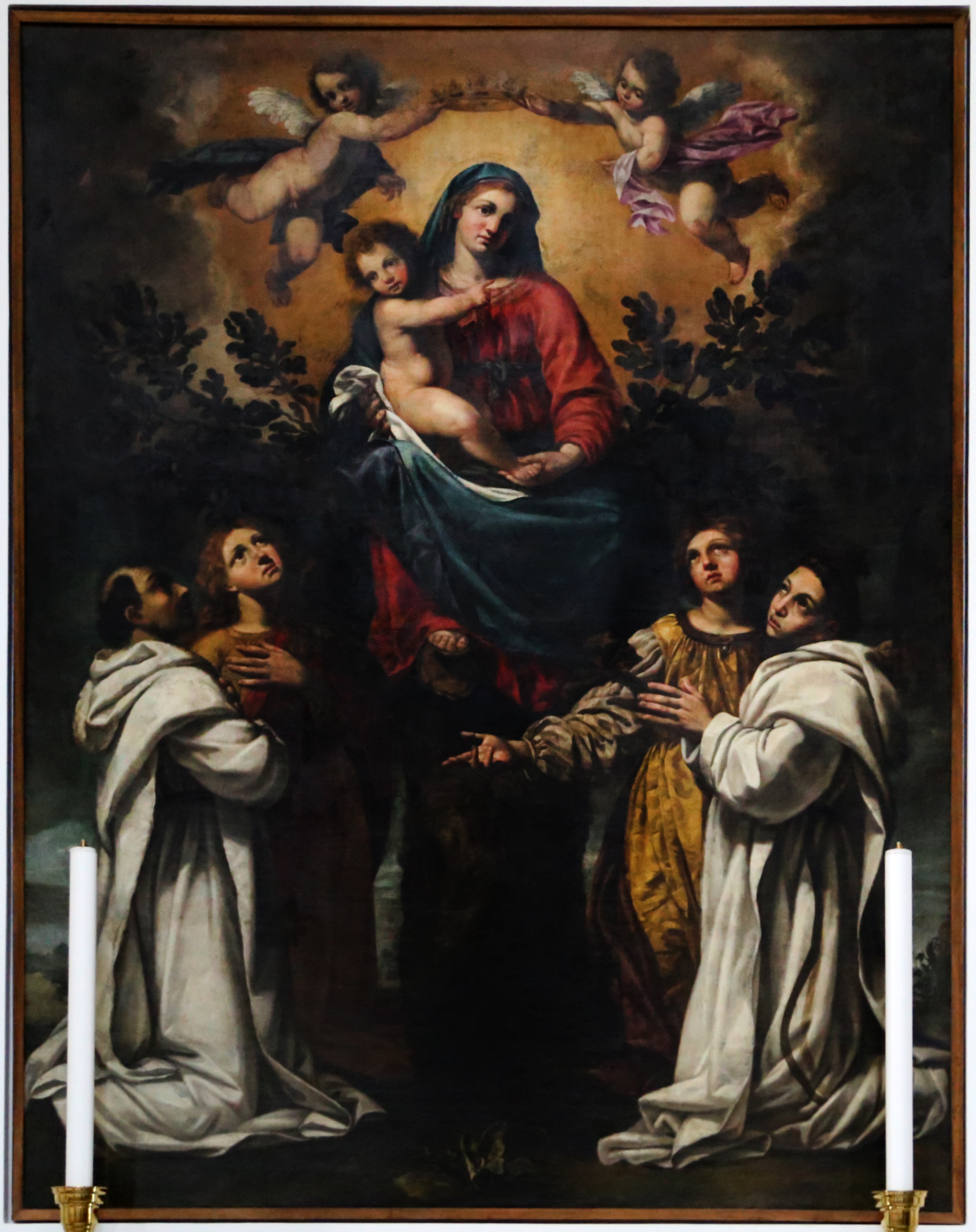
Madonna and Saints, Santa Maria della Quercia, Viterbo

One source attributes his training to Giuseppe d'Arpino. He was apparently nicknamed The Spaniard. he painted an altarpiece depicting a Madonna and Child with Angels and Saints for Sant'Angelo in Spatha. He painted the wall frescoes for the chapel of the Palazzo dei Priori. He painted an altarpiece depicting the Assumption of the Virgin for the church of Santi Faustino e Giovita. He painted the Pentecost for the church of San Biagio. he painted a Mary Magdalen for the Confraternity of the same name. Along with Giuseppe d'Arpino, he painted an altarpiece depicting a Crucifixion with St Jerome and the Lion for the church of San Rocco.
