= Rocca Albornoz, Viterbo =

Coordinates: 42.42180°N 12.10458°E

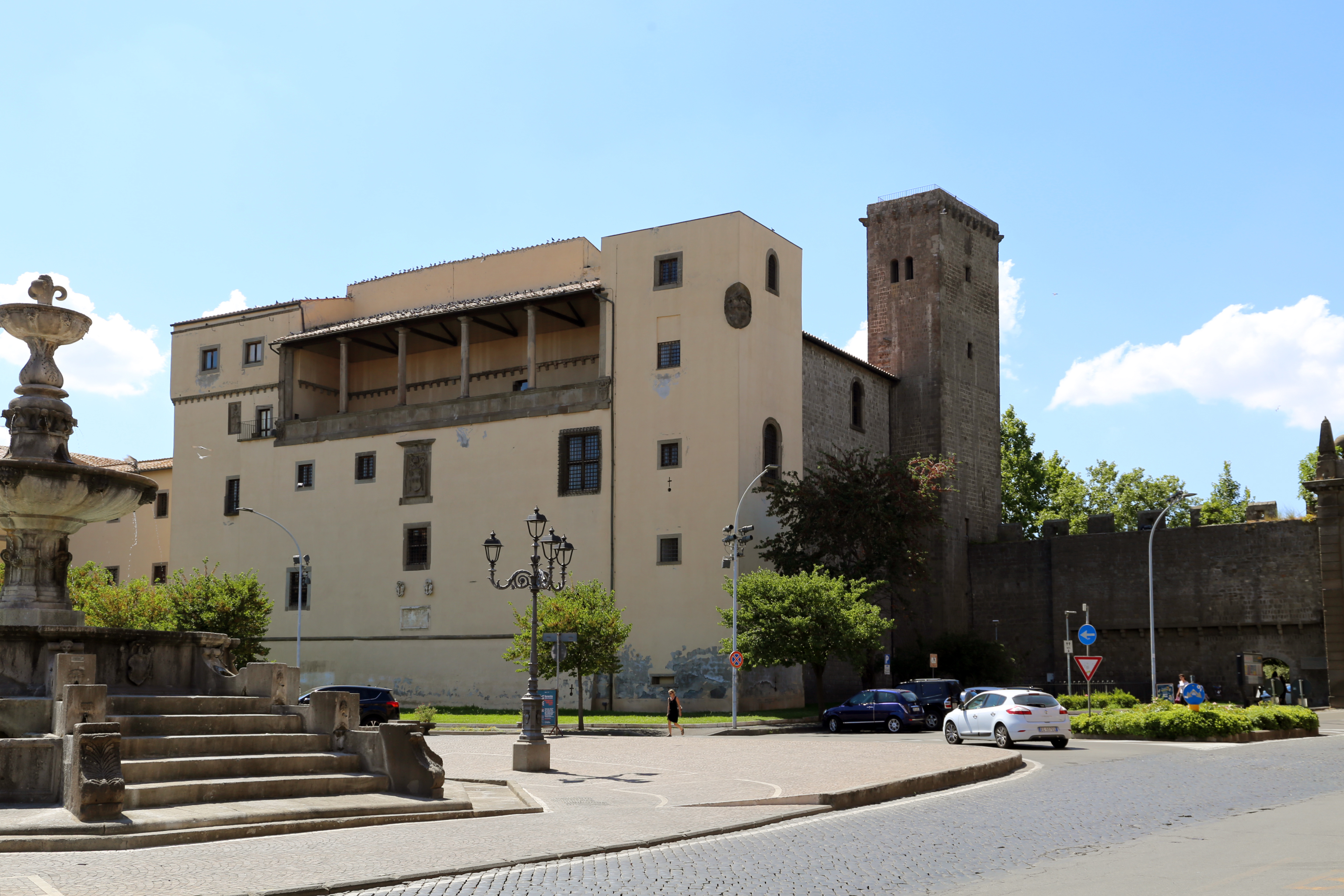
Facade of Rocca Albornoz

The Rocca Albornoz or Castle Albornoz was originally a medieval castle in Viterbo, region of Lazio, Italy. The original castle was erected by Gil de Albornoz (also known as Egidio Albornoz), legate for pope Clement VI and condottieri, after the defeat in 1354 of Giovanni di Vico, till then lord of Viterbo, who had usurped much of the Papal territories in the Lazio and Umbria. The structure, razed and rebuilt over the centuries, is now the Museo Nazionale Etrusco Rocca Albornoz (a National Etruscan archeology museum).

== History and description ==
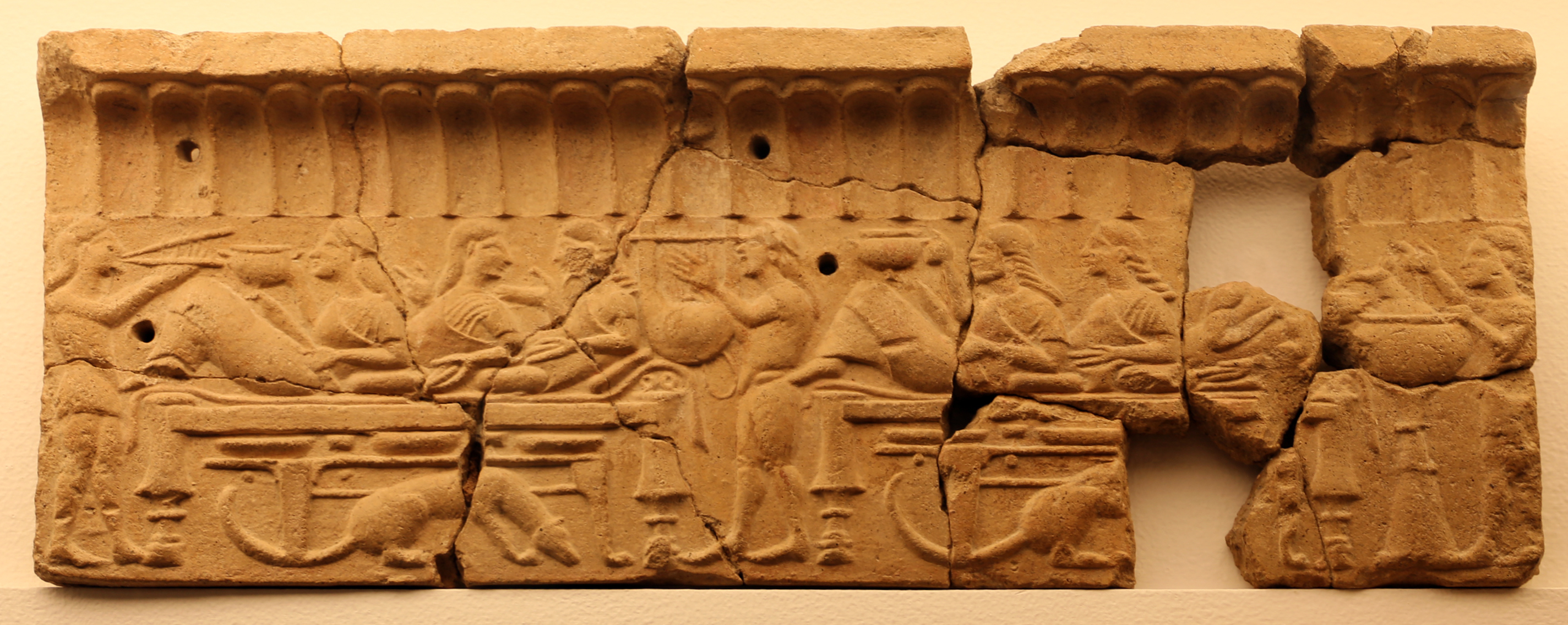
Etruscan frieze from Aquarossa

The palace was erected soon after the defeat of Giovanni dei Vico in the Battle of Viterbo on 10 March 1354. The first stone was laid by Albornoz himself, and was atop the palace of Messer Campano, located near San Faustino church and the Porta di Santa Lucia (now Porta Fiorentina). Pope Urban V in 1367, upon his return to Rome from Avignon, was the first pope to reside in this fort. In 1375, the fortress fell again into the hands of a prefect of Viterbese forces including Francesco Di Vico, son of Giovanni, and the castle was razed in the civil conflicts. Pope Boniface IX was able to wrest Viterbo back into the papal state and rebuilt the castle. In 1438, Cardinal Giovanni Vitelleschi allowed the townspeople to again raze the fortress. Nineteen years later, under Pope Calixtus III, the fortress was again rebuilt starting in 1457. To do so, various confiscated properties in town, including the Palazzo of the rebellious Tignosini, were destroyed. In the 16th-century, Pope Julius II commissioned Bramante to help rebuild the central courtyard. In 1523, the castle briefly housed the Knights of Rhodes, who had been exiled by Ottoman armies. Depictions of the former castle demonstrated the castle was surrounded by a ditch and had a fortified entrance with a drawbridge.

In 1682, the castle was sold to the Sebastiano Zazzera, a local nobleman. The heirs of Zazzera in turn sold it to Monsignor Innico Caracciolo, who established an orphanage at the site. In 1860, the building was requisitioned by General Lamoricière as barracks. In 1888, the surrounding ditch was filled in, the drawbridge destroyed, and the outlines of the present, awkward, facade added. Damaged by allied bombardment in World War II, the facade on the piazza was reconstructed during 1960 to 1979.

The present exhibits contain artifacts excavated from Etruscan sites at Acquarossa, San Giovenale, Musarna, and from the Ancient Ferento Roman Theater. It displays a mosaic with Etruscan inscriptions.
