= Ferentium =

Roman ancient town

- Ferentum
- Location within Lazio
- 42°29′19″N 12°07′57″E
- Type: Settlement
- Cultures: Etruscan
- Region: Lazio (Province of Viterbo)

Site notes
- Excavation dates: yes
- Condition: ruined
- Public access: yes

Ferentium was a town of ancient Etruria, situated near the modern city of Viterbo in the northern part of the Roman province of Latium, now in modern Lazio. The city was also known as Ferentinum, Ferentum or Ferentia, and should not be confused with ancient Ferentinum (now Ferentino), which is in southern Lazio.

== History ==
Ferentium had an Etruscan predecessor at modern Acquarossa, as shown by the presence of a necropolis. In the Roman period, the city was a municipium of the Stellatina tribe and part of the seventh regio of the province of Italia. Several famous families came from the city, including that of the Roman emperor Otho and Flavia Domitilla, the wife of the emperor Vespasian. Either she or her identically named daughter were worshipped as diva Domitilla.

Around 400 AD. diocese Ferentium was established. After 700 AD, the diocese was suppressed. In 1172 Ferentium was conquered, sacked, and depopulated by Viterbo, and the territory incorporated into this neighboring city.

== Remains ==
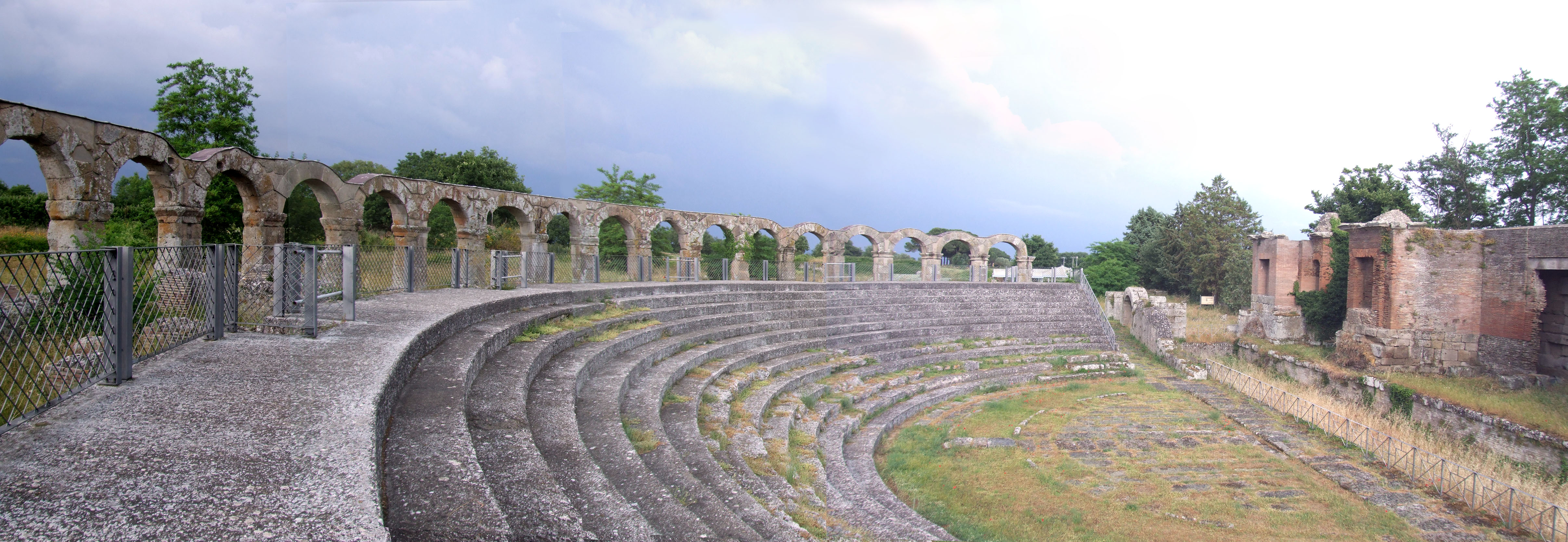
Ruins of the Ancient Roman theater of Ferentium

Extensive remains of the ancient Roman city are still extant, including the Ferento Roman Theater and several domestic and municipal buildings.

== Archaeological investigations ==
Much of the early work at the site is due to the "archaeologist king" Gustaf VI Adolf of Sweden. The most recent excavations took place between 1994 and 2009 under the supervision of Tuscia University in Viterbo. Many of the most important remains may be found in the National Archaeological Museum at Rocca Albornoz, Viterbo, including some reconstructed building remains and some marble statues depicting characters from classical tragedy and comedy which presumably came from the area of the theater. A small wooden model of the theater is also present.

Nearby sites include "Acquarossa" which was itself excavated in the years between 1956 and 1978 by the Swedish Institute in Rome.

== Literature ==
The site appears in the famous The Cities and Cemeteries of Etruria by George Dennis.

== See also ==
- Viterbo
