= Giovanni Battista Crescenzi =

Italian painter and architect (1577–1635)

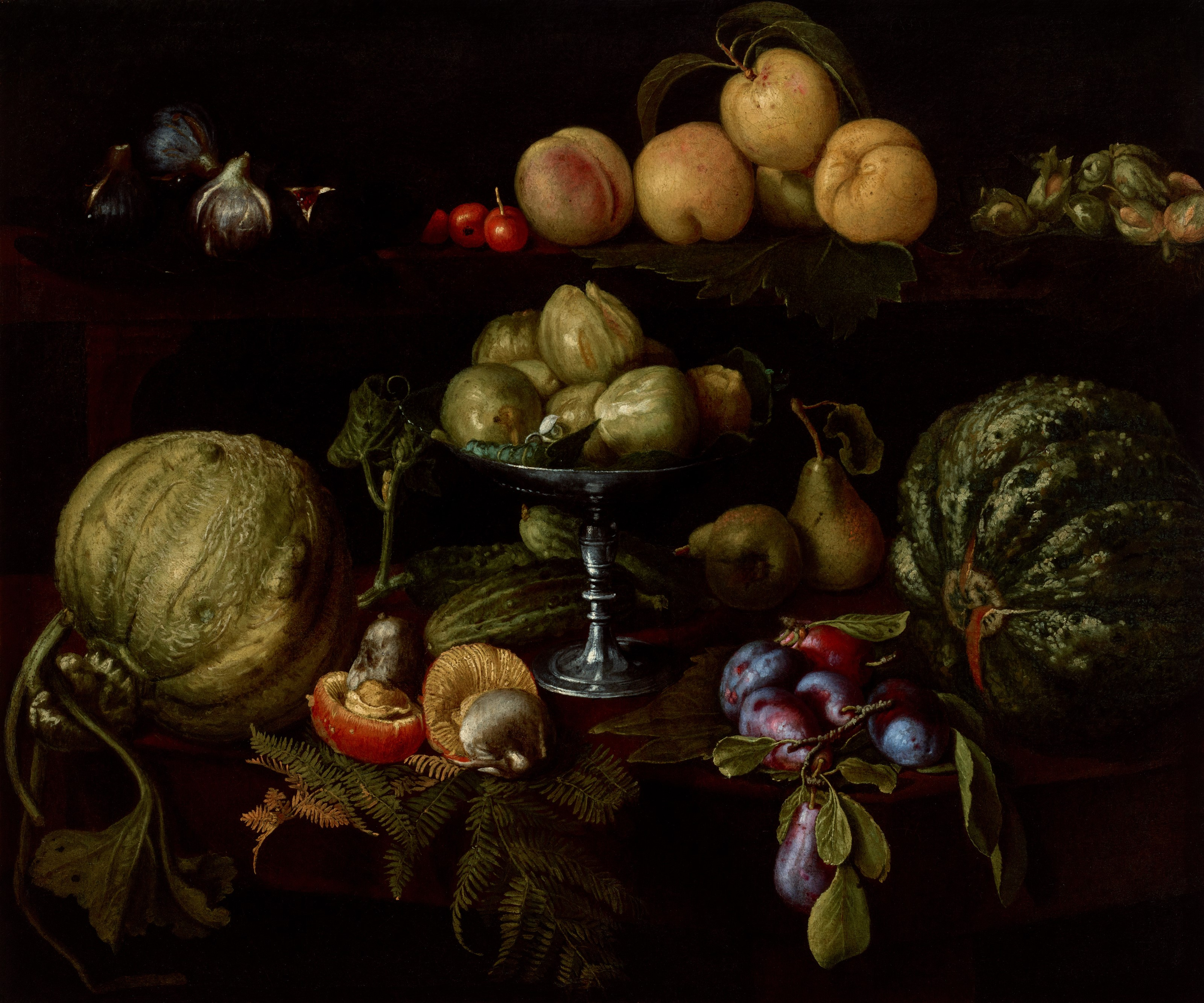
Still-life with Figs

Giovanni Battista Crescenzi (1577–1635) was an Italian painter and architect of the early-Baroque period, active in Rome and Spain, where he helped decorate the pantheon of the Spanish kings at El Escorial.

He rose to prominence as an artist during the reign of Pope Paul V, but by 1617 had moved to Madrid, and from 1620 on, he was active in El Escorial. Philip III of Spain awarded him the title of Marchese de la Torre, Knight of Santiago.

His family was a prominent Roman family. His brother, Pier Paolo Crescenzi, was a cardinal. He married Anna Massima, and his son, Alessandro Agostino, became cardinal in 1675, while a distant nephew, Marcello, became cardinal in 1743. Among his pupils were Bartolomeo Cavarozzi, Juan Fernández, and Antonio de Pereda.

== Sources ==
- Baglione, Giovanni (1733) [1641]. Le Vite de' Pittori, Scultori, Architetti, ed Intagliatori dal Pontificato di Gregorio XII del 1572. fino a' tempi de Papa Urbano VIII. nel 1642 [Lives of the painters, sculptors, architects, and engravers during the papacies of Gregory XII in 1572 to Urban VIII in 1642]. Naples: Giovanni Battista Passari. p. 249.
